= Amsterdam-Zuidoost =

Coordinates: 52°18′38″N 4°58′24″E

Amsterdam Zuidoost
- Borough of Amsterdam
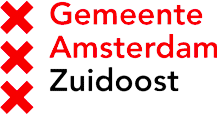
- Brandmark

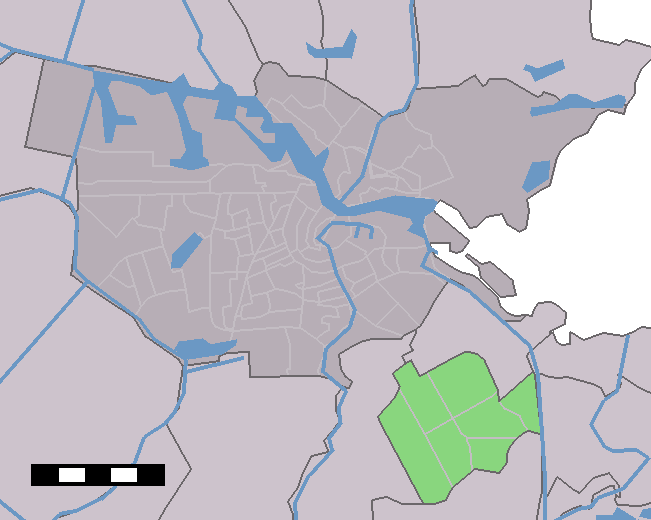
- Country: Netherlands
- Province: North Holland
- Municipality: Amsterdam

Area
  - Total: 22.08 km^{2} (8.53 sq mi)

Population
  - Total: 84,567
  - Density: 3,830/km^{2} (9,920/sq mi)
- Postal code: 1101 - 1109
- Website: https://www.amsterdam.nl/stadsdelen/zuidoost/

Amsterdam-Zuidoost (Dutch pronunciation: [ˌɑmstərdɑmˈzœyt.oːst]; "Amsterdam-Southeast") is a borough (stadsdeel) of Amsterdam, Netherlands. It consists of four residential neighborhoods—Bijlmermeer, Venserpolder, Gaasperdam and Driemond—as well as the Amstel III/Bullewijk Business Park and the Amsterdam Arena entertainment and shopping district.

Geographically, Amsterdam-Zuidoost is an exclave of Amsterdam as it does not border any of the other boroughs. As of 2013, Amsterdam-Zuidoost had almost 84,000 inhabitants.

== History ==
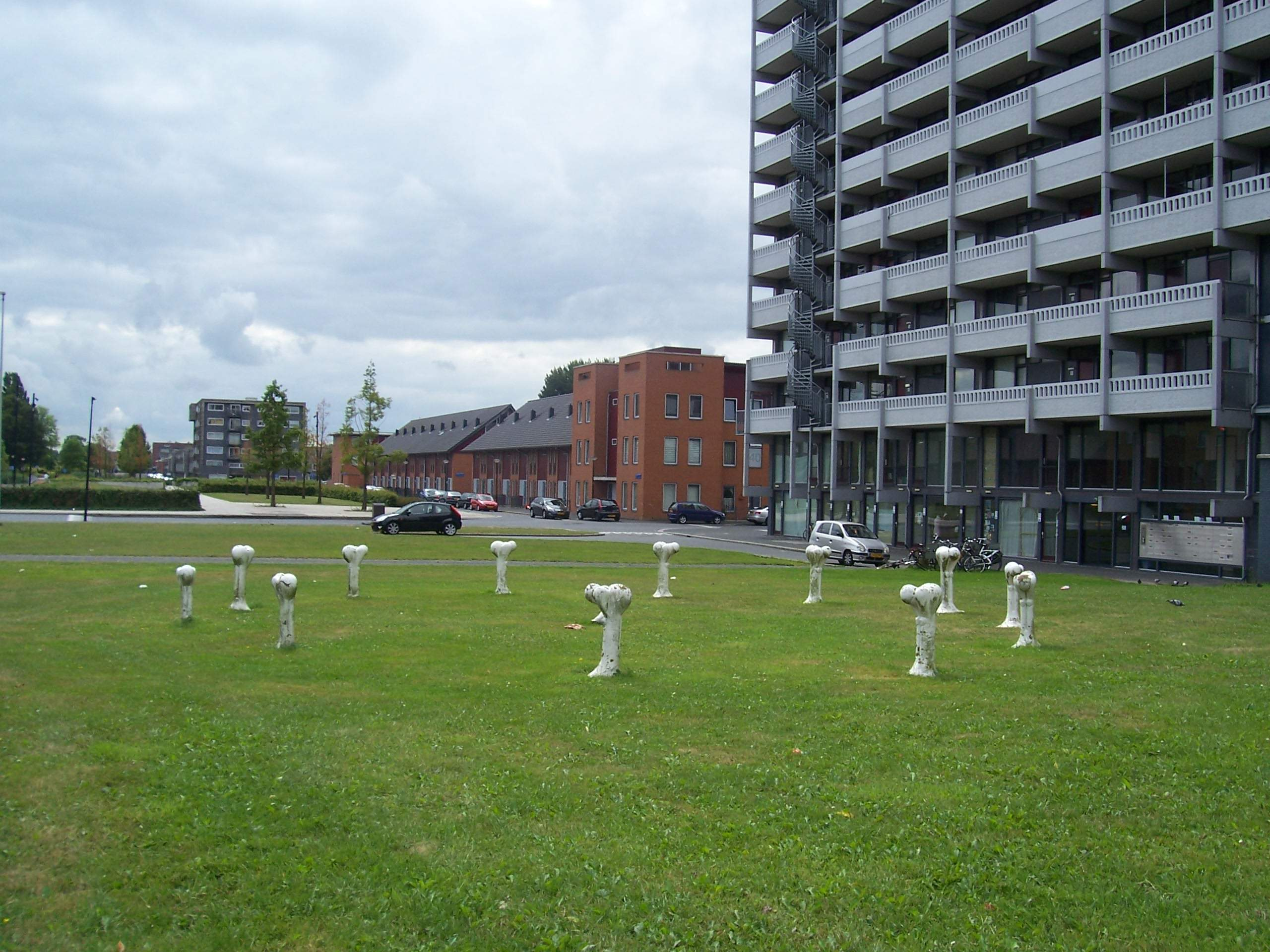
Original highrise and urban renewal low-rise homes in Bijlmermeer

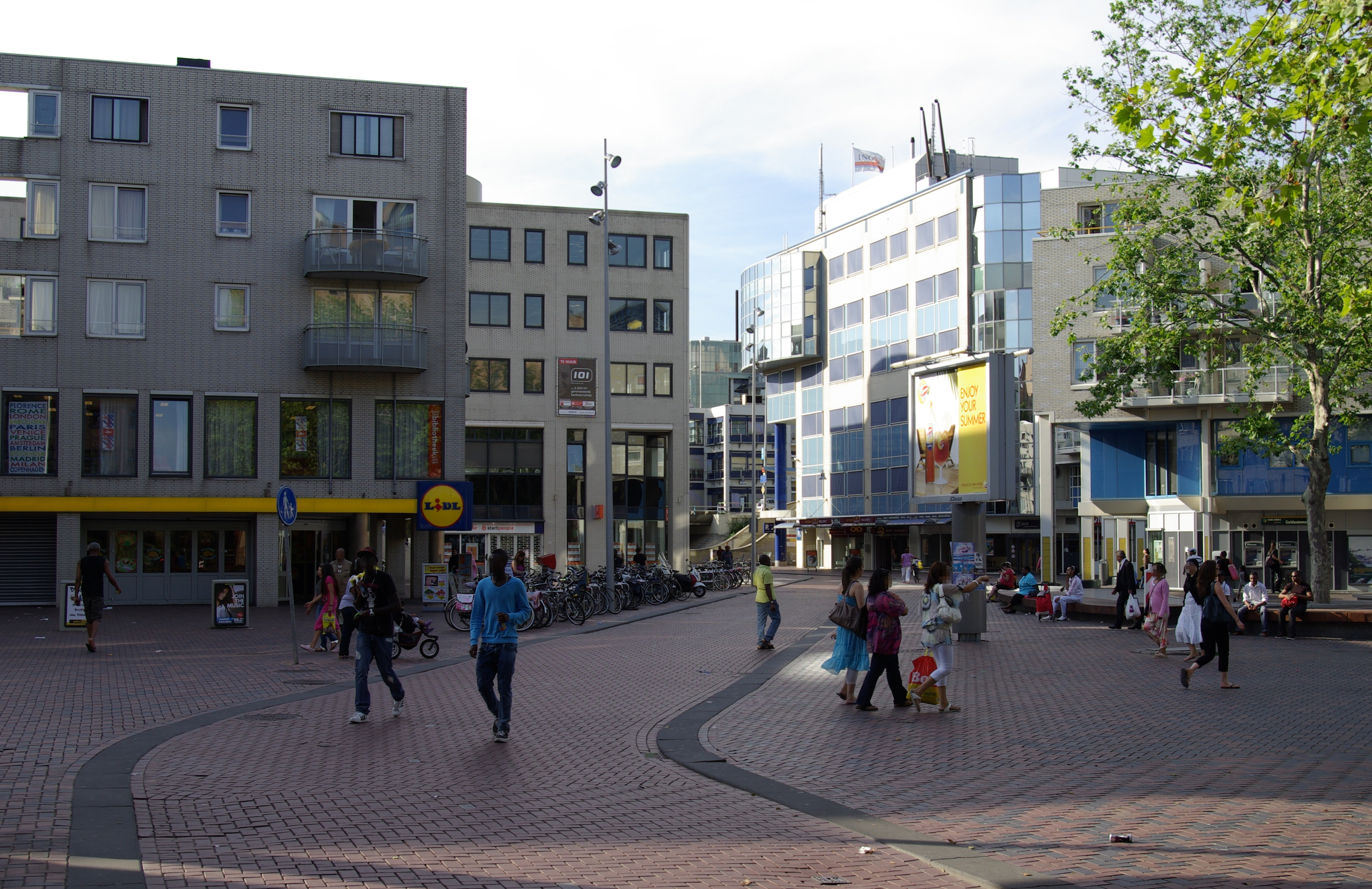
Amsterdamse Poort shopping centre, Bijlmermeer

The largest neighborhood of Amsterdam-Zuidoost is Bijlmermeer, planned in the 1960s as a modern, functional 'town of the future' in accordance with the principles of the Swiss architect Le Corbusier. In total, 18,000 homes would be built, 13,000 of which were in highrise tower blocks, many of them built together to form a distinct "honeycombed" pattern. Roads were elevated above the ground, with separate routes for cars, buses, bicyclists and pedestrians. The main architect of Bijlmermeer was Siegfried Nassuth. Construction of the Bijlmermeer began in 1963. The first tower block, named Hoogoord, was completed in 1968. The last of the 13,000 apartments was completed in 1975. In 1977, Amsterdam's first metro line was opened, connecting Zuidoost to the city center and Amsterdam Centraal.

Soon after its completion, however, it turned out that the new neighborhood with its functional, monotone highrise buildings was not as popular as expected. As rents dropped, the area attracted many underprivileged residents, including recently arrived migrant groups. It has the largest community of people of Surinamese descent in Amsterdam, many of whom came to the Netherlands after Suriname's independence in 1975. The area gained the reputation of a poor neighborhood with high unemployment. With its tall, impersonal and increasingly abandoned towerblocks allowing for little social oversight, the area struggled with soaring crime rates and vandalism.

In 1992 the Bijlmermeer was struck by disaster as an Israeli El Al Boeing 747-258F crashed into the tower blocks named Groeneveen en Kruitberg in the very heart of the neighborhood. The El Al Flight 1862 disaster killed 43 people, including the three Israeli pilots. A memorial has been erected at the crash site.

In the 1990s and 2000s, the borough was subject to large-scale urban renewal projects initiated by the borough and city administrations as well as housing associations (woningcorporaties) who owned many of the tower blocks. The original idea of functional separation between living, working, traffic, and recreation was abandoned. Some tower blocks were demolished and replaced by small-scale, low-rise residential areas. In 2007 the eastern part of the Bijlmermeer neighborhood was marked aandachtswijk (disadvantaged neighborhood) by minister for housing Ella Vogelaar, which made national urban renewal funds and programmes available to the area.

== Borough government ==
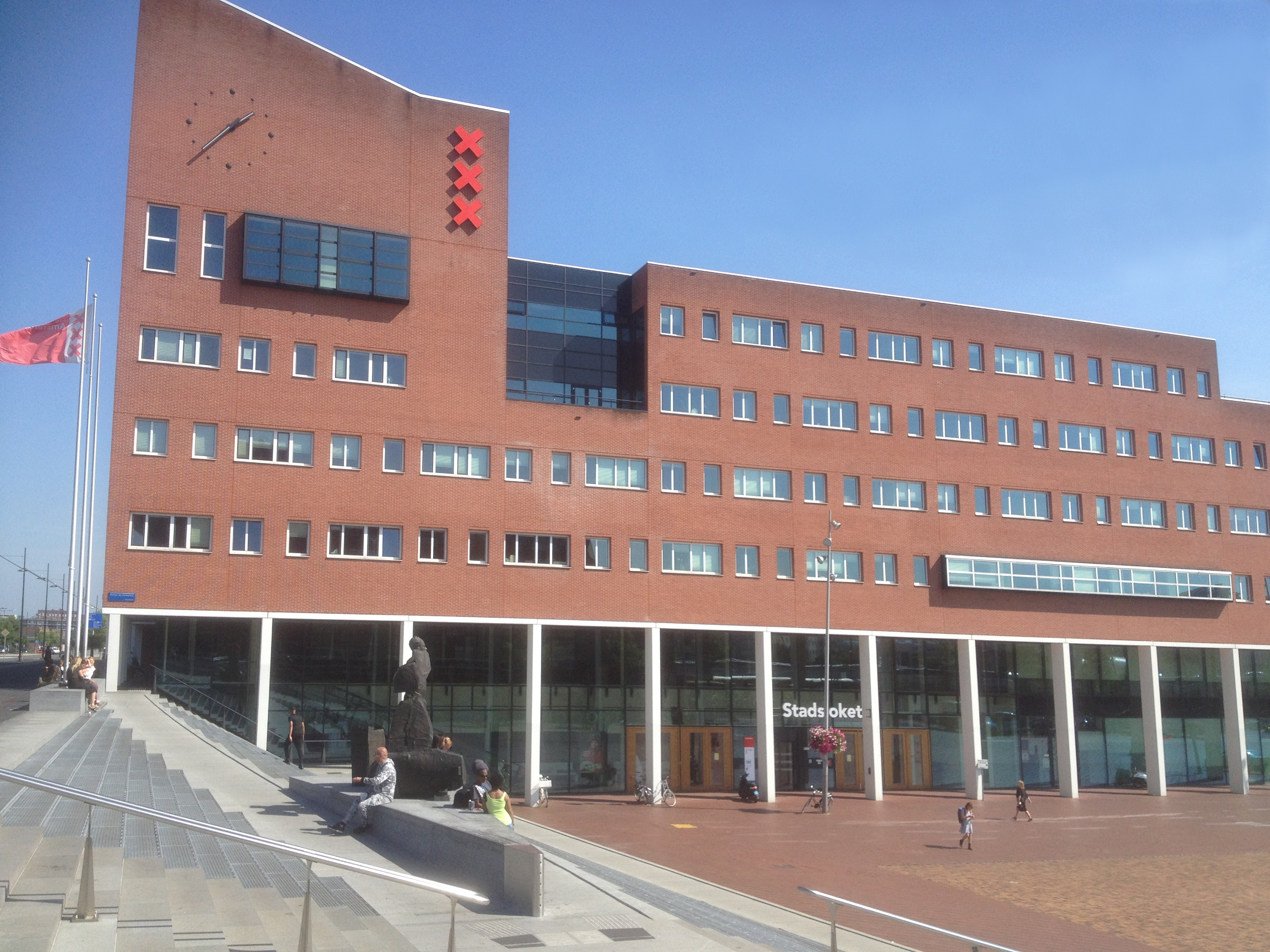
Stadsdeelkantoor ('district office') (2016) at Anton de Komplein, Bijlmermeer

Until 2014, the Amsterdam boroughs, called stadsdelen or "districts", were governed by a directly elected district council (deelraad) as well as a separate district executive board, the members of which were appointed and controlled by the council. Since the 2014 municipal elections, the district councils have been abolished and replaced by smaller, but still directly elected district committees (bestuurscommissies). The district committees are elected every four years, on the same day as the city's central municipal council. The city's mayor and alderman then appoint an executive committee (dagelijks bestuur) for the daily administration of the borough. The district committees' jurisdiction is determined by the central municipal council. Responsibilities delegated to the 2014–2018 district committees include parks and recreation, streets and squares, refuse collection, permits and events, preparation of zoning plans, passports and drivers licenses, and welfare work. As of 2018, members of the executive committee also had portfolios for anti-discrimination and diversity, crime and public safety, adult and vocational education, art and culture, energy transition, environmental issues, the circular economy, as well as refugees and undocumented migrants.

The district committee of Amsterdam Zuidoost consists of 13 seats. The committee was elected on 19 March 2014. Five national political parties and two local parties are represented on the committee. A third local party, winning one seat, could not claim the seat as none of the candidates on the list was willing to accept it. On 7 April 2014, the committee elected its executive committee. The executive committee chair is Muriël Dalgliesh (PvdA), and the other members are Urwin Vyent (GL) and Emile Jaensch (VVD).

A new committee was elected in the 2018 Dutch municipal elections and Tanja Jadnanansing (PdvA), Dirk de Jager (GL), and Jakob Wedemeijer (SP) were appointed as dagelijks bestuur for Amsterdam-Zuidoost.

District Committee Zuidoost	PvdA	D66	GL	PZO	VVD	OZO	CU	DENK	50Plus	SP	(Vacant)
2014 elections	4	2	2	1	1	1	1				1
2018 elections	3	1	3		2			1	1	1	

The borough office (stadsdeelkantoor or "district office") of Amsterdam Zuidoost is located at Anton de Komplein 150.

== Transport ==
Amsterdam-Zuidoost is served by bus, metro and NS rail services. Duivendrecht and Amsterdam Bijlmer ArenA stations serve the very north of the borough; Amsterdam Holendrecht railway station serves the Academic Medical Center as well its surrounding area.

Amsterdam Metro routes 50, 53 and 54 also serve the borough at the following stations:

Lines 50 and 54: Duivendrecht, Standvliet, Bijlmer Arena, Bullewijk, Holendrecht, Reigersbos, Gein

Line 53: Venserpolder, Ganzenhoef, Kraaiennest, Gaaserplas
