= Line 54 (Amsterdam Metro) =

Metro line of Amsterdam, Netherlands

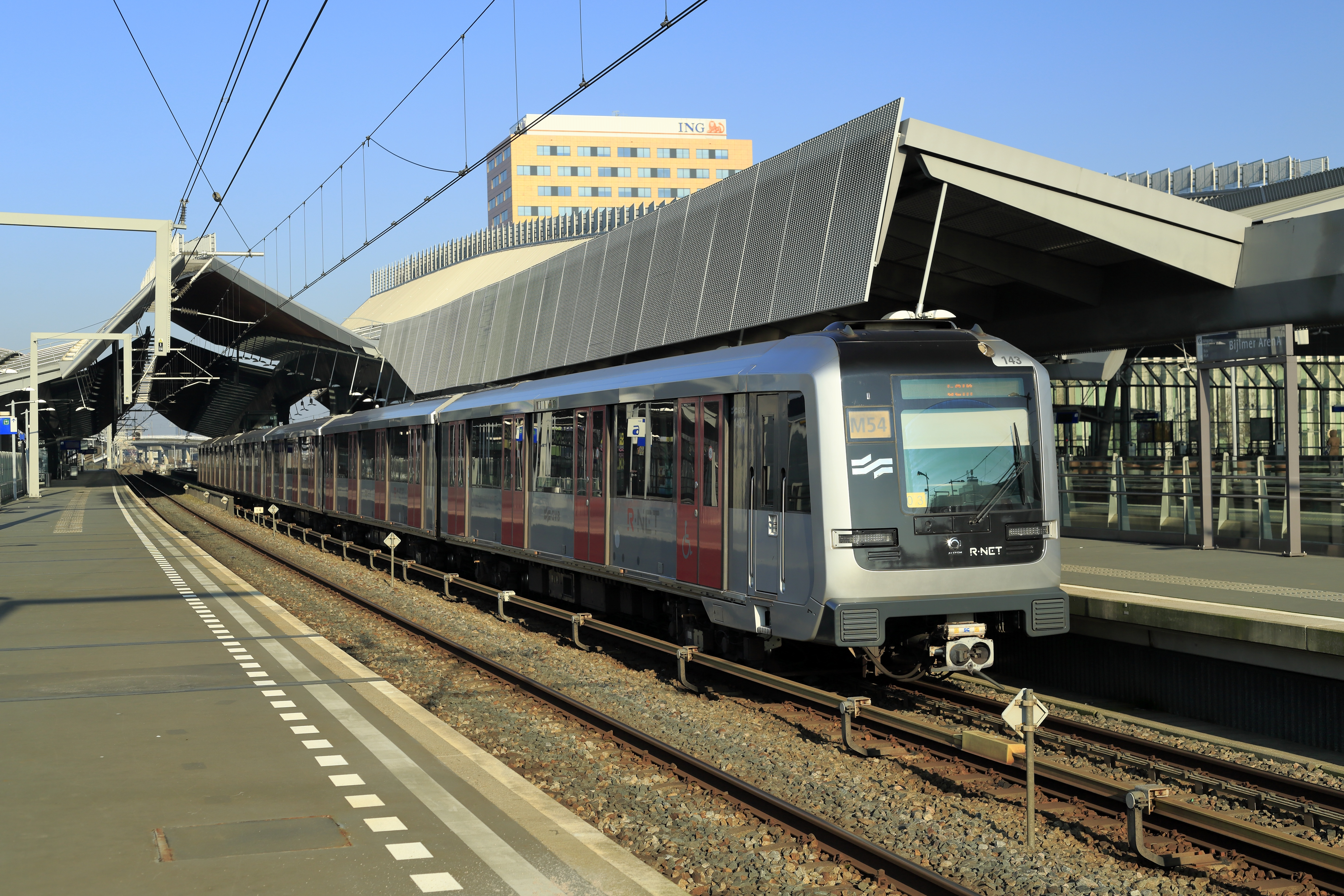
- A M5 series train in Amsterdam Bijlmer ArenA station

Overview
- Native name: Metrolijn 54 / Geinlijn
- Owner: Amsterdam Metro
- Locale: Amsterdam and Ouder-Amstel
- Termini: Amsterdam Centraal; Gein
- Stations: 15
- Color on map: Yellow

Service
- Type: Rapid transit
- Operator(s): GVB
- Rolling stock: S3/M4; M5; M7
- Daily ridership: 73,500 (2019)

History
- Opened: 14 October 1977; 47 years ago

Technical
- Line length: 12.7 km (7.9 mi)
- Number of tracks: Double-track
- Track gauge: 1,435 mm (4 ft 8 1/2 in) standard gauge
- Electrification: Third rail, 750 V DC
- Operating speed: 70 km/h (43 mph)
Route map

Line 54 (Dutch: Metrolijn 54), also known as the Gein Line (Dutch: Geinlijn), is a line of the Amsterdam Metro system. It runs between Amsterdam Centraal in the city center and Gein metro station in the southeastern neighborhood of Gaasperdam. The line forms the southern branch of the Oostlijn (East Line).

The initial segment of the line, between Weesperplein and Holendrecht, opened on 14 October 1977, replacing the former bus line 55. An extension to Amsterdam Centraal was completed on 11 October 1980. The final segment, from Holendrecht to Gein, opened on 27 August 1982.

Line 54 is 12.7 km (7.9 mi) long and includes 15 stations. It runs underground through central Amsterdam, emerging to the surface as it follows NS railway lines. After Holendrecht, the line branches off onto its own dedicated right-of-way leading to Gein.

Until 2013, the line was primarily operated using M1, M2, and M3 rolling stock, which were built between 1973 and 1980 specifically for the Oostlijn. These units were gradually phased out and replaced by the M5 series between 2013 and 2015. The M7 series later entered service beginning in 2023.

== Service ==
Train frequency
Time period	Frequency
Rush hour and daytime	10 minutes
Early morning (before 07:00), evenings (after 20:00), and weekends (before 10:00)	15 minutes
Evenings (until 20:00) and weekends (after 10:00)	12 minutes
Midsummer rush hour and daytime	12 minutes
Midsummer early morning, evenings, and weekends	15 minutes

=== Station list ===
Station	Transfers	Borough
Centraal Station	51 Line 51; 52 Line 52; 53 Line 53; Amsterdam–Rotterdam railway; Amsterdam–Schiphol railway; Amsterdam–Arnhem railway; Amsterdam–Zutphen railway; Den Helder–Amsterdam railway	Centrum
Nieuwmarkt	51 Line 51; 53 Line 53	Centrum
Waterlooplein	51 Line 51; 53 Line 53	Centrum
Weesperplein	51 Line 51; 53 Line 53	Centrum
Wibautstraat	51 Line 51; 53 Line 53	Oost
Amstel	51 Line 51; 53 Line 53; Amsterdam–Arnhem railway	Oost
Spaklerweg	51 Line 51; 53 Line 53	Ouder-Amstel
Van der Madeweg	50 Line 50; 53 Line 53	Ouder-Amstel
Duivendrecht	50 Line 50; Weesp–Leiden railway; Amsterdam–Arnhem railway	Zuid
Strandvliet	50 Line 50	Zuidoost
Bijlmer ArenA	50 Line 50; Amsterdam–Arnhem railway	Zuidoost
Bullewijk	50 Line 50	Zuidoost
Holendrecht	50 Line 50; Amsterdam–Arnhem railway	Zuidoost
Reigersbos	50 Line 50	Zuidoost
Gein	50 Line 50	Zuidoost

== Gallery ==
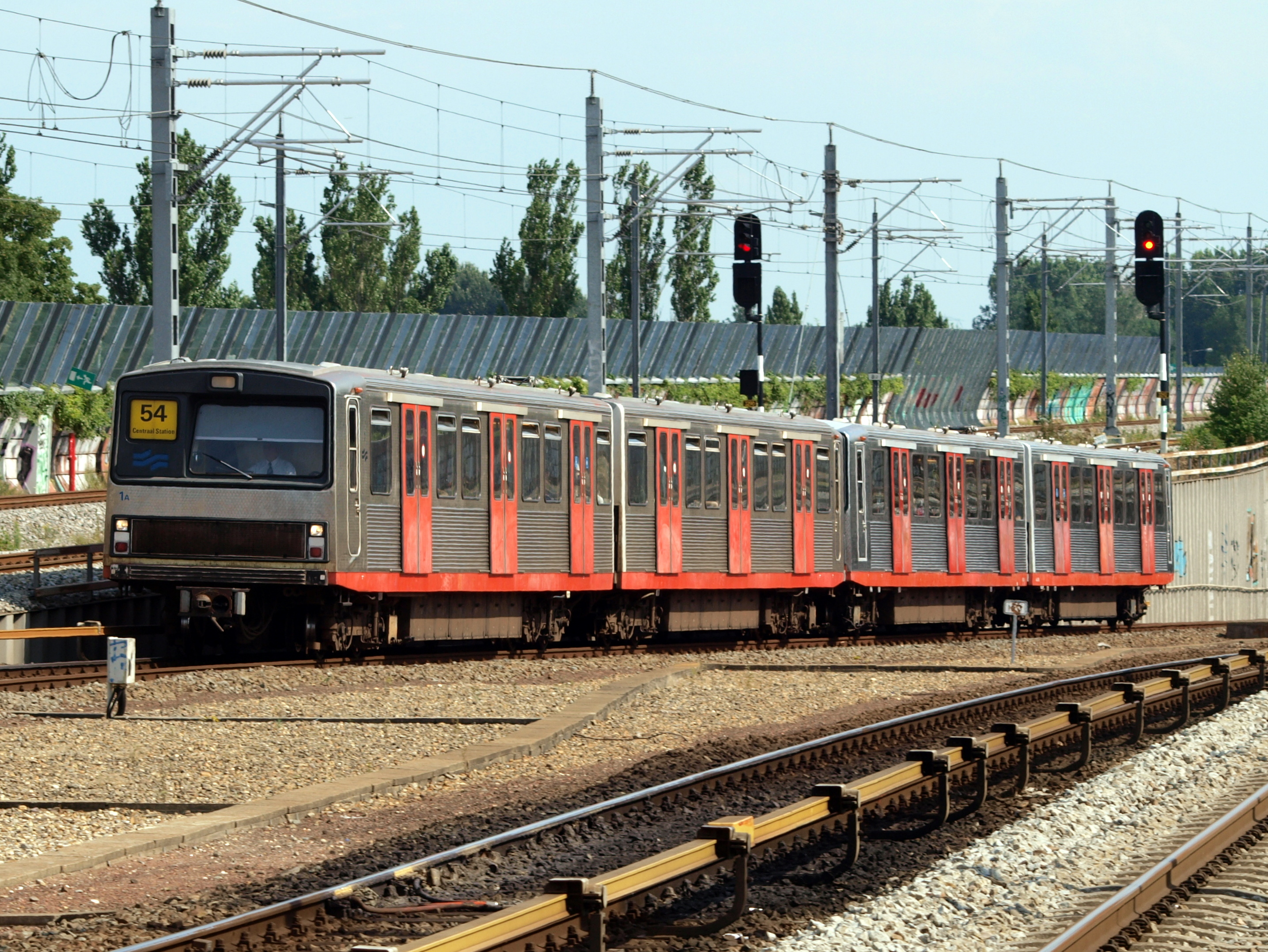
A former LHB M3 train in the original color combination with orange doors near Holendrecht (2009)

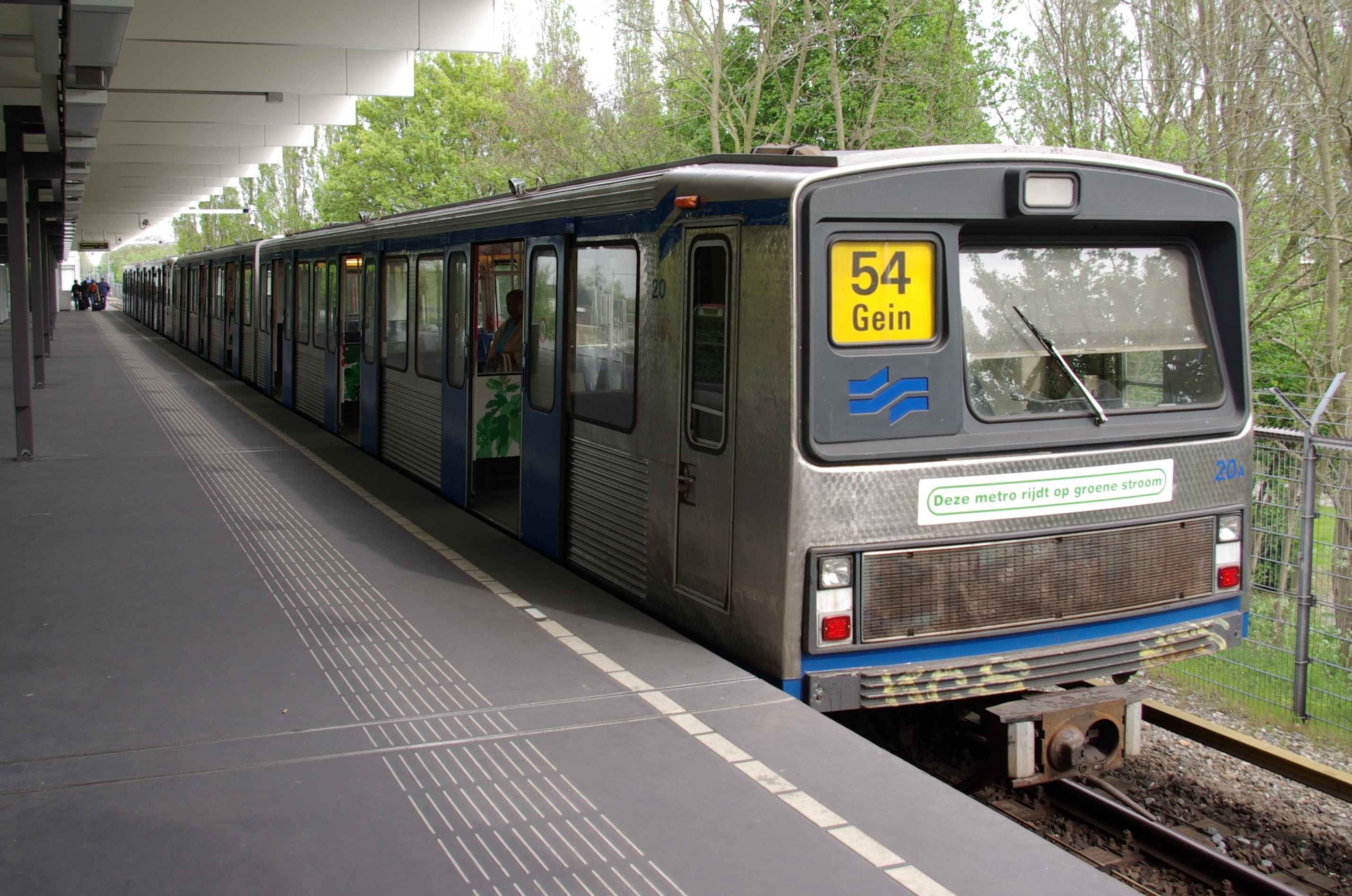
A former LHB M2 train in Gein station (2010)

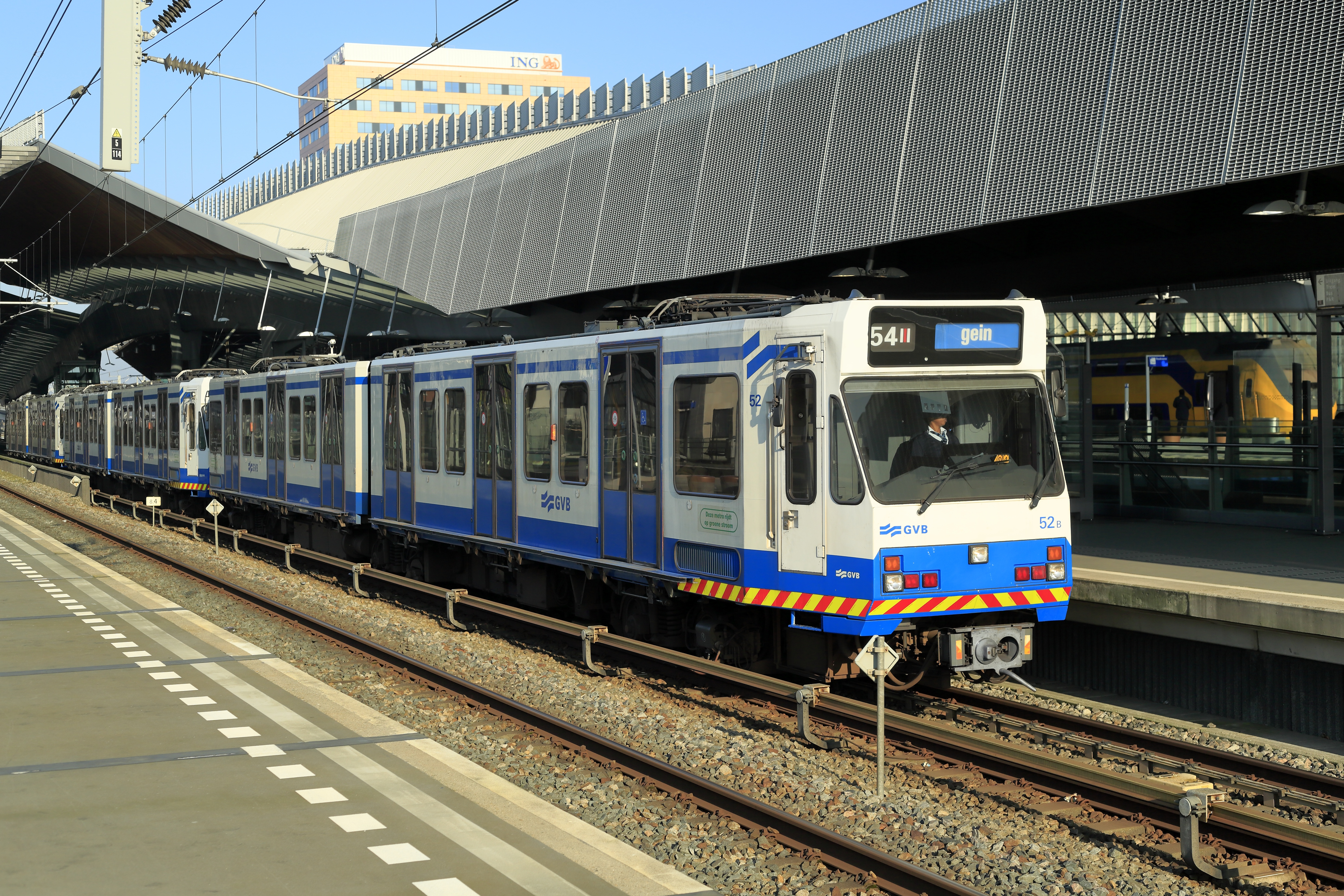
A former BN S1/S2 series train in Amsterdam Bijlmer ArenA station

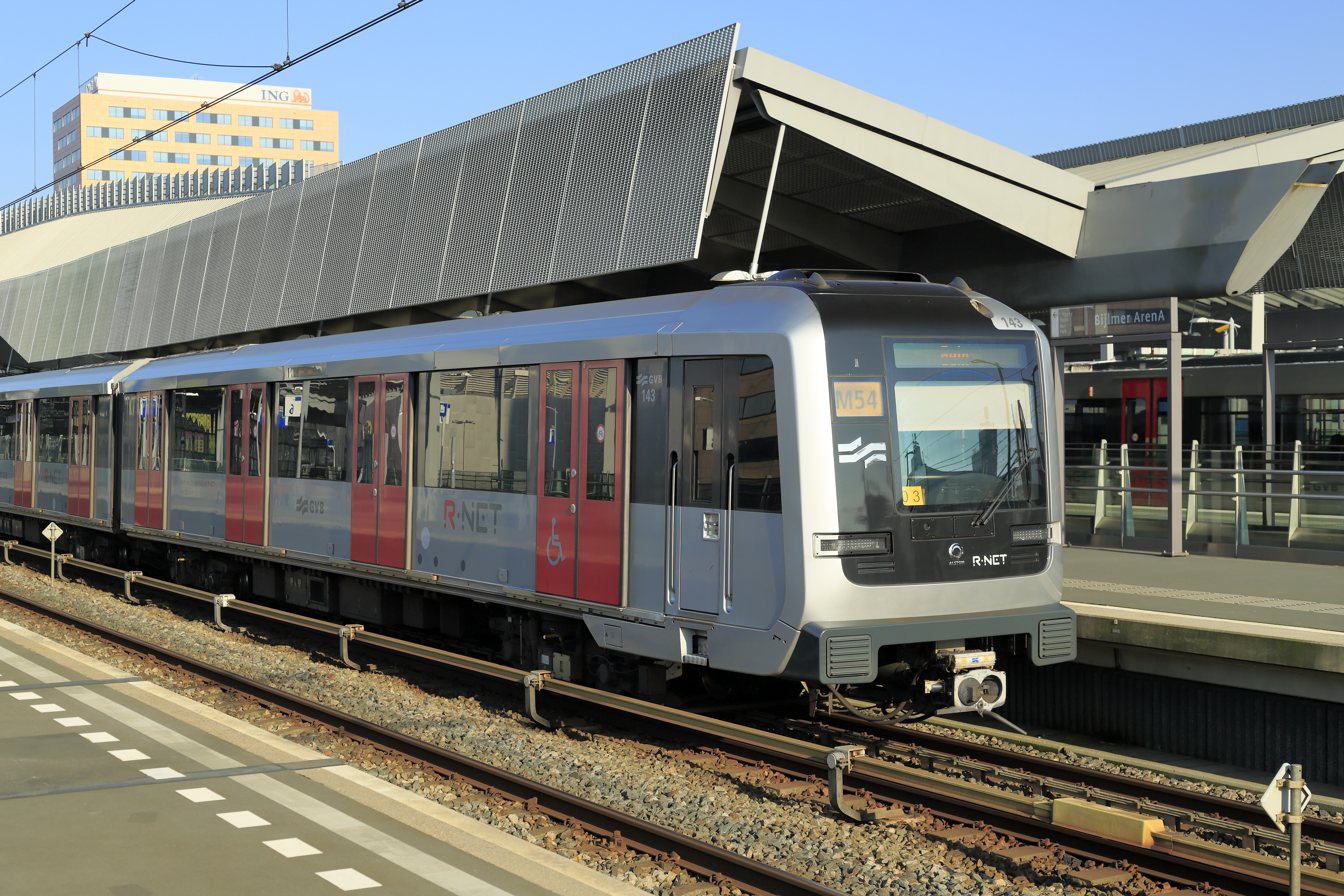
An Alstom M5 series train in Amsterdam Bijlmer ArenA station
