= RS (rapper) =

Dutch drill rapper (2000–2019)

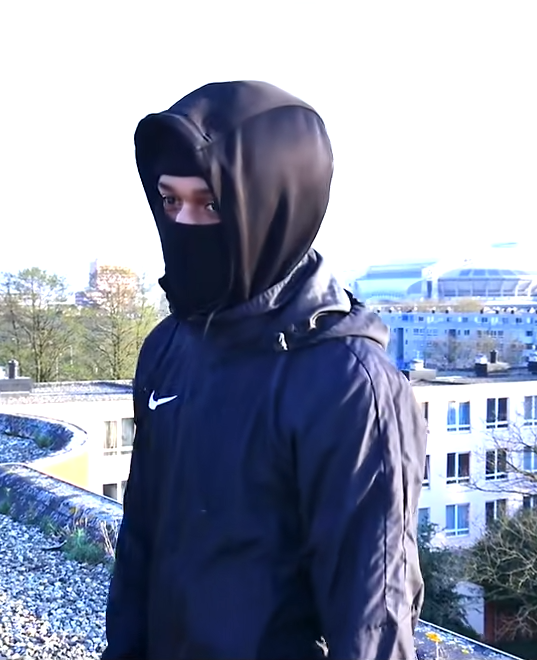

Background information
- Also known as: TrappyDemon, Almighty RS
- Born: Jay-Ronne Steven Grootfaam; 27 October 2000; Amsterdam, Netherlands
- Origin: Venserpolder, Netherlands
- Died: 3 September 2019 (aged 18) Amsterdam, Netherlands
- Genres: Drill; Hip Hop
- Occupation: Rapper
- Instrument: Vocals
- Years active: 2015–2019

Jay-Ronne Steven Grootfaam (27 October 2000 – 3 September 2019), better known under his pseudonym RS, was a Dutch drill rapper and the former frontman of the drill rap group FOG. He has been described as "the most well-known member" of one of the most significant drill rap groups of the Netherlands.

== Life ==
Grootfaam was born in Amsterdam on 27 October 2000. He was raised by parents with an Afro-Surinamese background. As a teenager, he followed a vmbo education at Bindelmeer College in Amsterdam. Around this time, he started to create hip hop. A few years later, Grootfaam founded the drill rap group FOG.

== Music ==
Grootfaam's music was characterized by a demonic and dark aesthetic. He rapped about violence, criminality and his life in the neighbourhood Venserpolder.

== Death ==
On 3 September 2019 Grootfaam was stabbed to death by a member of a rival drill rap group. It was the first time in Dutch history that someone died as a result of a drill feud.

Grootfaam's death formed an important moment for the Dutch societal discussion about what role drill rap had played in the at the time increasing cases of knife violence among the youth.
