= Amsterdam Bijlmer ArenA station =

Railway station in Amsterdam

Amsterdam Bijlmer ArenA
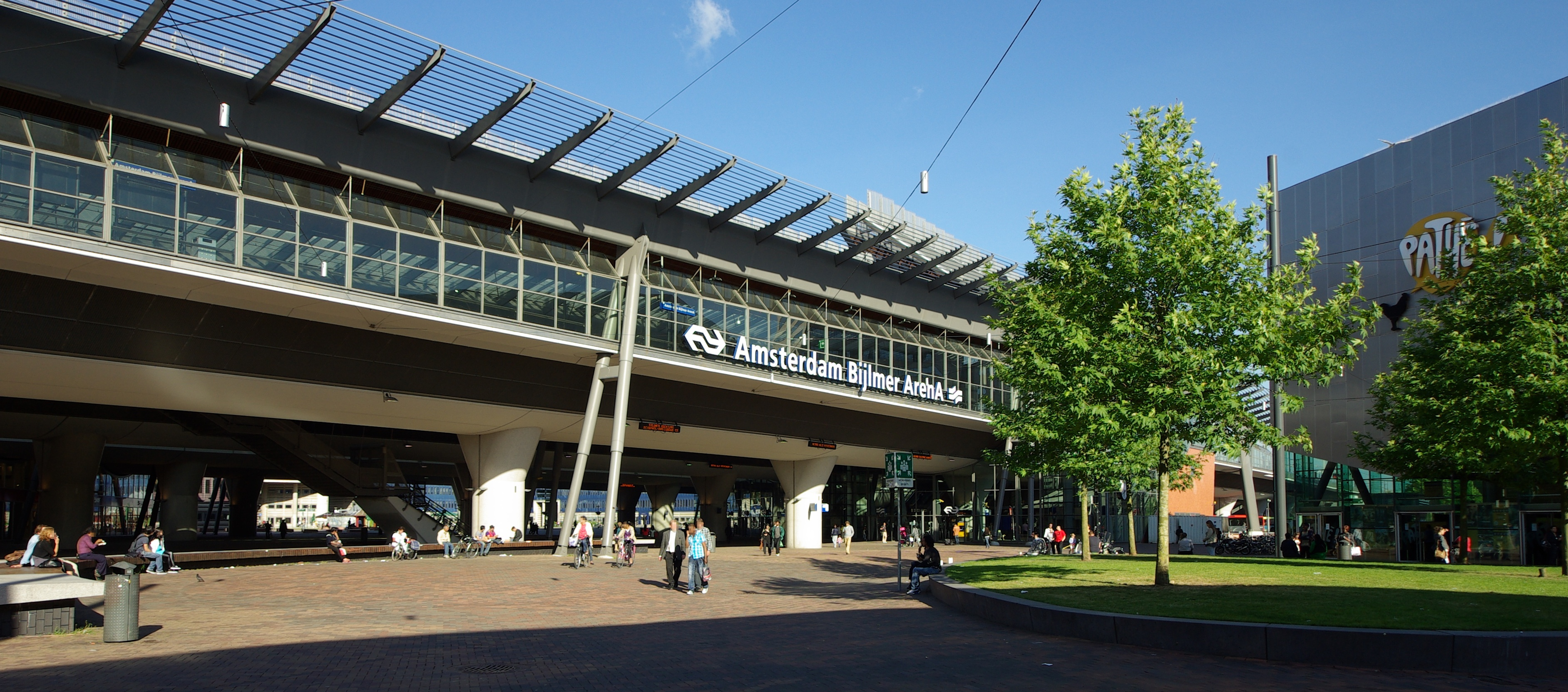
- Amsterdam Bijlmer ArenA railway station in 2011

General information
- Location: Amsterdam; Netherlands
- Coordinates: 52°18′47″N 4°56′46″E
- Operator: Nederlandse Spoorwegen
- Line: Amsterdam–Arnhem railway
- Platforms: 6 (train); 2 (metro)

Other information
- Station code: Asb

History
- Opened: 1971 (first railway station); 1976 (second railway station); 2007 (third railway station)
- Former names: Amsterdam Bijlmer (1971–2006)

Services
Preceding station	Nederlandse Spoorwegen	Following station
Amsterdam Centraal towards Rotterdam Centraal	NS Nachtnet 1400 Night Train, Tuesday only	Utrecht Centraal Terminus
Amsterdam Zuid towards Den Haag Centraal	NS Intercity 3100	Utrecht Centraal towards Nijmegen
Amsterdam Zuid towards Rotterdam Centraal	NS Intercity 3200 Mon-Thurs before 19:00	Utrecht Centraal towards Arnhem Centraal
Amsterdam Zuid towards Dordrecht	NS Intercity 3500	Utrecht Centraal towards Venlo
Schiphol Airport towards Leiden Centraal	NS Nachtnet 11450 Tuesday Night only	Terminus
Duivendrecht towards Uitgeest	NS Sprinter 4000	Amsterdam Holendrecht towards Rotterdam Centraal
Duivendrecht towards Uitgeest	NS Sprinter 7400 Peak hours only	Amsterdam Holendrecht towards Driebergen-Zeist
Preceding station	Arriva Netherlands	Following station
Amsterdam Centraal towards Schiphol Airport	Nachttrein 32710 Friday night only	Utrecht Centraal towards Maastricht
Preceding station	Amsterdam Metro	Following station
Strandvliet towards Isolatorweg	Line 50	Bullewijk towards Gein
Strandvliet towards Centraal Station	Line 54	Bullewijk towards Gein
Location
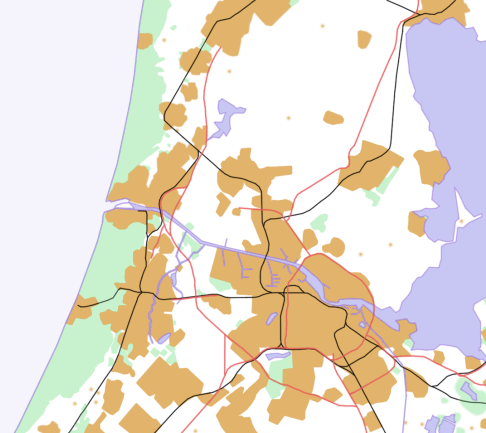
- Location within Northern Randstad Location within Netherlands

Amsterdam Bijlmer ArenA station (Dutch pronunciation: [ˌɑmstərˈdɑm ˈbɛilmər aːˈreːnaː]; abbreviation: Asb), formerly known as Amsterdam Bijlmer (1971–2006), is a railway station in located in the Bijlmermeer neighbourhood of the Amsterdam-Zuidoost borough in Amsterdam, Netherlands. The station has five platforms and eight tracks: two tracks and one platform are used by the Amsterdam Metro, while the remaining six tracks and four platforms serve Nederlandse Spoorwegen train services. A large bus station is also integrated into the complex. The station is located adjacent to the Johan Cruyff Arena, home of AFC Ajax and a major event venue.

== History ==
Originally opened on 24 May 1971, the station has been rebuilt twice. In July 2007, a large part of the rebuilding was completed and on 17 November 2007 the station was fully opened. The new station was designed by Grimshaw Architects of London in association with Arcadis Architecten.

The station arches over ArenA Boulevard. The complex is almost 100 metres (330 ft) long, 70 m (230 ft) wide, and 30 m (98 ft) tall. It is mostly transparent, to blend in with the rest of the Boulevard.

The metro services that stop at this station are Line 50 (Isolatorweg–Gein) and Line 54 (Amsterdam Centraal – Gein).

On 10 December 2006 the station's name was changed from Amsterdam Bijlmer to Amsterdam Bijlmer ArenA, to match its location (ArenA Boulevard), named after the nearby Amsterdam ArenA stadium (since 2018 known as the Johan Cruyff Arena), home of AFC Ajax. On the west side are AFAS Live and Pathé ArenA cinema with 14 screens and the newly built event venue Ziggo Dome. On the east side is Amsterdamse Poort.

== Train services ==
The station is served by the following train services, operated by Nederlandse Spoorwegen (NS):

- 2× per hour Intercity service: Schiphol – Utrecht – Arnhem – Nijmegen
- 2× per hour Intercity service: Schiphol – Utrecht – Eindhoven – Venlo
- 2× per hour Sprinter (local) service: Uitgeest – Amsterdam – Breukelen – Woerden – Rotterdam
- 2× per peak hour Sprinter (local) service: Uitgeest – Amsterdam – Breukelen – Utrecht – Rhenen
- 2× per night Nachtnet service: Rotterdam – Delft – (Gouda) – The Hague – Leiden – Schiphol Airport – Amsterdam Centraal – Amsterdam Bijlmer ArenA – Utrecht

== Metro services ==
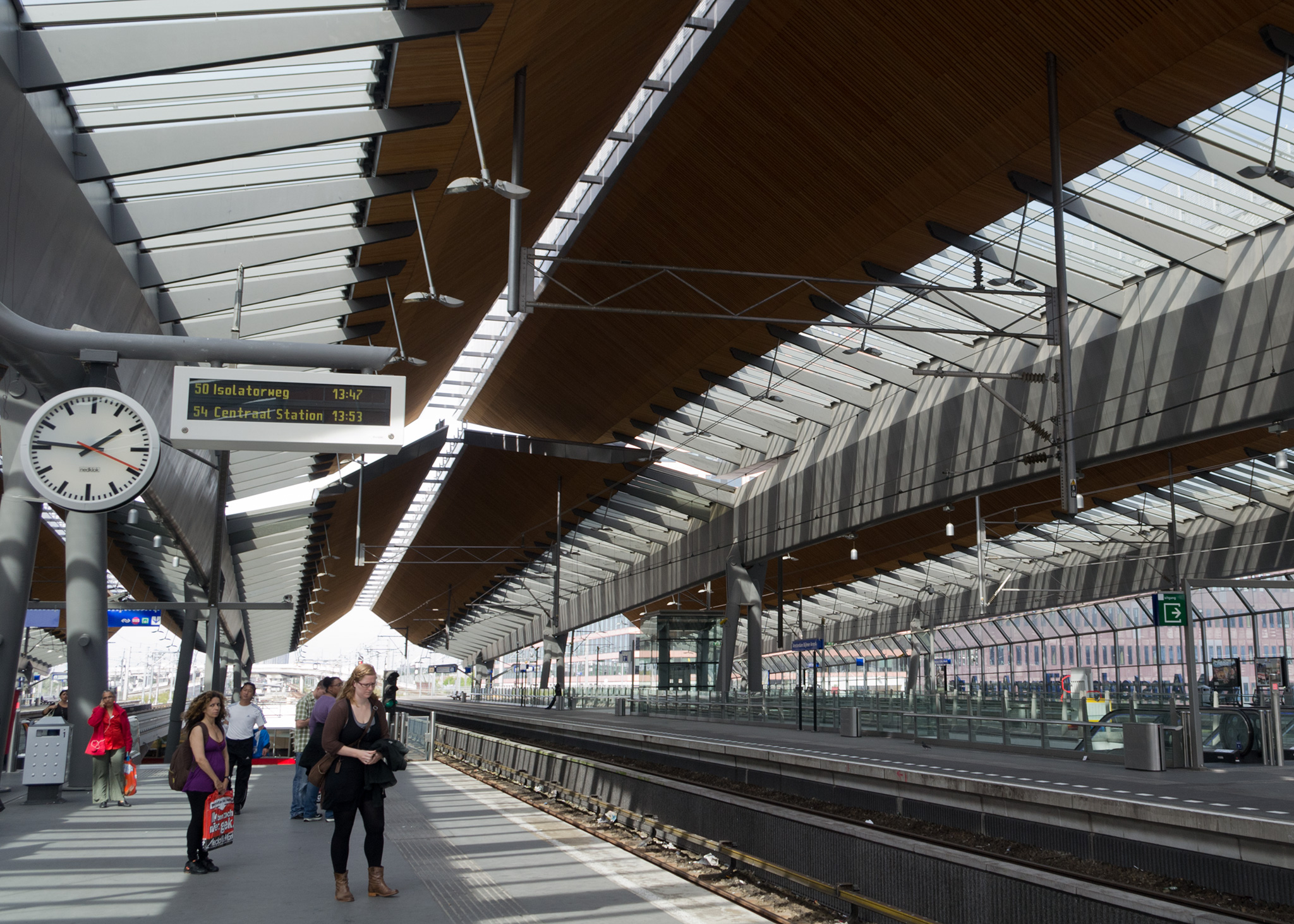
View from Metro Platform

Metro services are operated by GVB:

- Line 50, the Ring Line, runs between Isolatorweg and Gein.
- Line 54, the Gein Line, runs between Centraal Station and Gein.

Both lines generally operate every 10 minutes between approximately 05:00 and 00:40, with less frequent service in the early morning and late night hours. On weekends, services start later in the morning and typically run every 15 minutes.

== Track assignments ==
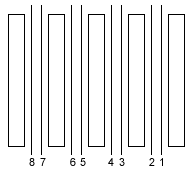
Track and platform layout

Track assignments reflect typical usage, but may vary due to operational changes or service disruptions.

Track	Use
1	Non-stopping trains
2	Services to Amsterdam Zuid and Schiphol via the Utrechtboog
3	Services towards Amsterdam Centraal
4 (Note: Not numbered on signage)	Metro services towards Isolatorweg (Line 50) and Amsterdam Centraal (Line 54)
5	Metro services towards Gein (Lines 50 and 54)
6	Services to Gouda and Rotterdam Centraal
7	Services towards Utrecht Centraal, Nijmegen, and Eindhoven via the Utrechtboog
8	Non-stopping trains

== Bus services ==
=== City bus services ===
These services are operated by GVB.

- 44 Bijlmer ArenA – Bijlmermeer – Diemen-Zuid – Diemen Centrum - Station Diemen – Diemen Noord
- 47 Bijlmer ArenA – Bijlmermeer – Gaasperplas – Gaasperdam – Holendrecht
- 49 Bijlmer ArenA – Karspeldreef – Gaasperplas – Driemond – Weesp railway station
- 66 Bijlmer ArenA – Bijlmermeer – Diemen - IJburg

=== Regional services ===
- 120 Bijlmer ArenA – Holendrecht – Abcoude – Baambrugge – Loenen a/d Vecht – Breukelen – Maarssen – Utrecht Zuilen – Utrecht Centraal
- 126 Bijlmer ArenA – Holendrecht – Vinkeveen – Wilnis – Mijdrecht
- 171 Bijlmer ArenA – Ouderkerk a/d Amstel – Amstelveen Busstation – Bovenkerk – Oranjewijk – Aalsmeer
- 200 Amsterdam Gaasperplas - Ganzenhoef - Bijlmer ArenA – Schiphol Noord - Schiphol Airport (One daily early morning ride)
- 255 Bijlmer ArenA - Haarlem (Rush hours only express service)
- 271 Amsterdam Gaasperplas - Ganzenhoef - Bijlmer ArenA - Aalsmeer FloraHolland (One early morning ride weekdays only)
- 300 Bijlmer ArenA – Ouderkerk a/d Amstel – Amstelveen Busstation – Schiphol Airport – Hoofddorp - Vijfhuizen - Haarlem
- 330 Bijlmer ArenA - Diemen - Muiden - Almere Busstation ‘t oor - Almere Tussen de Vaarten - Station Almere Buiten
- 356 Bijlmer ArenA - Ouderkerk a/d Amstel - Amstelveen Ouderkerkerlaan - Amstelveen Busstation - Schiphol Noord - Badhoevedorp - Haarlem

Busses 44, 47, 49 and 66 are operated by GVB.

Busses 171, 200, 255, 271, 300 and 356 are operated by Connexxion.

Busses 120, 126 and 330 are operated by Keolis.

Services 255, 300, 330 and 356 are part of the R-net network.

== Gallery ==
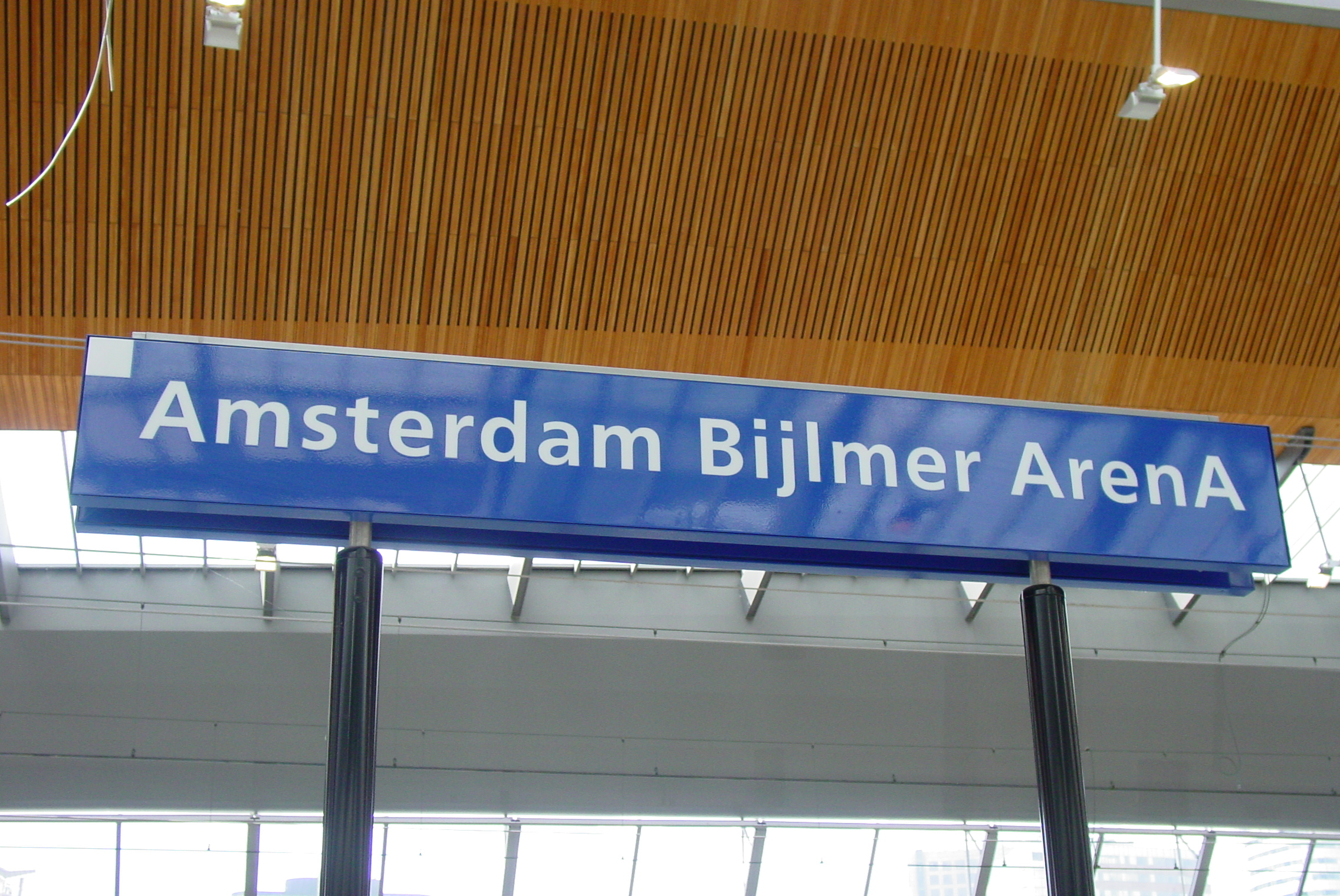
Sign on the platform showing the station name

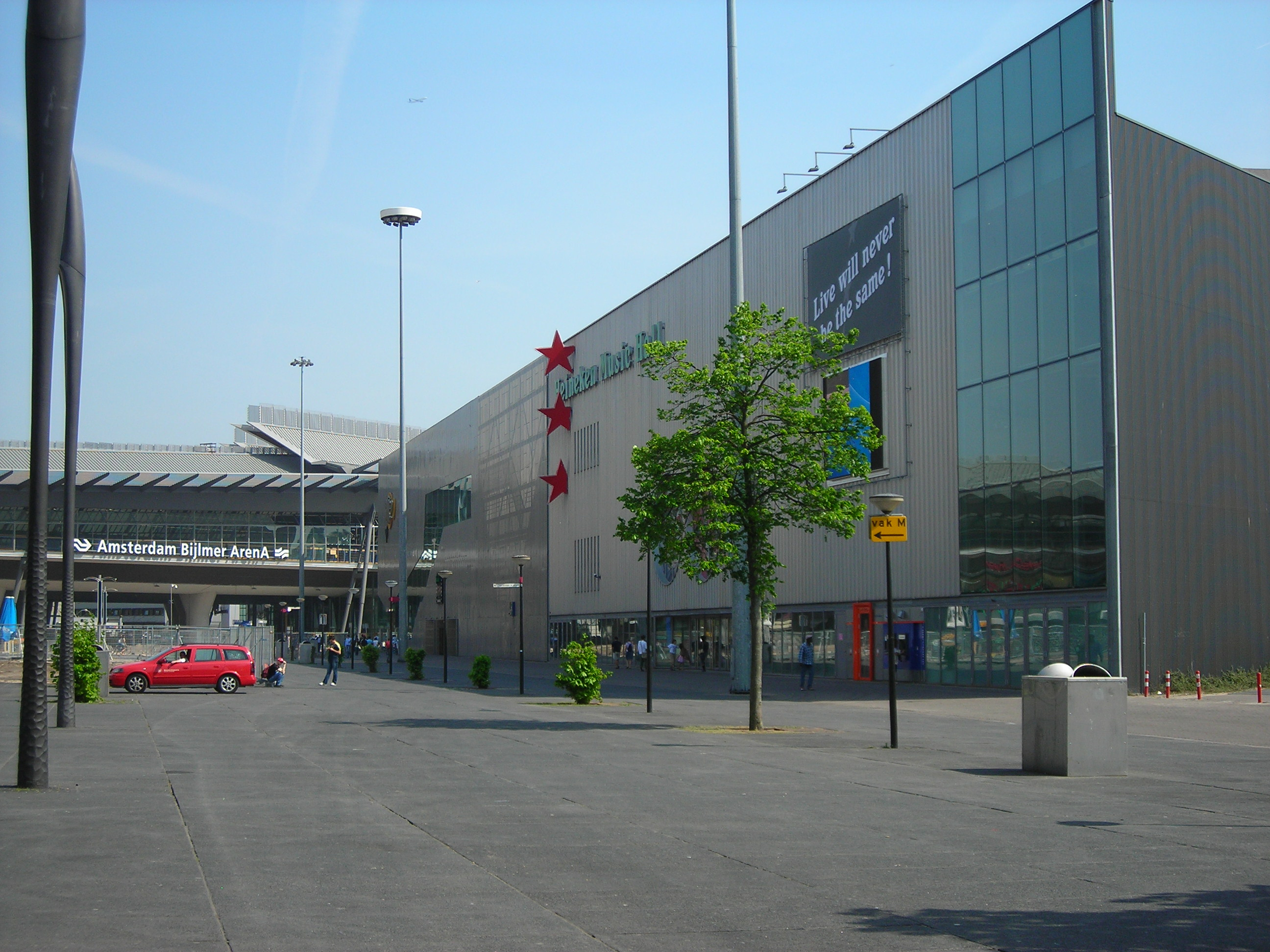
Heineken Music Hall, Pathe ArenA and Station Amsterdam Bijlmer ArenA

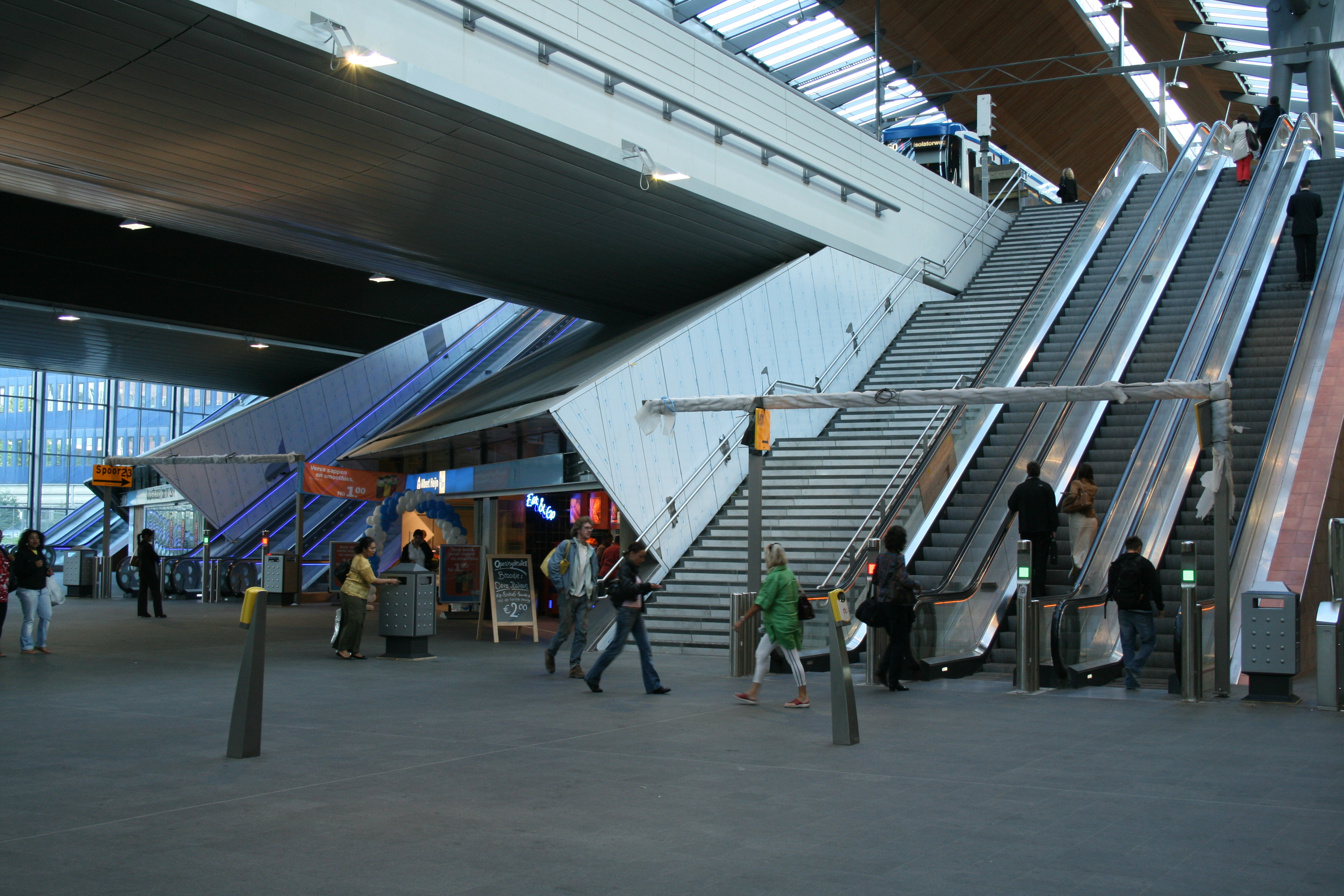
Station hall with escalators and metro platform (2007)

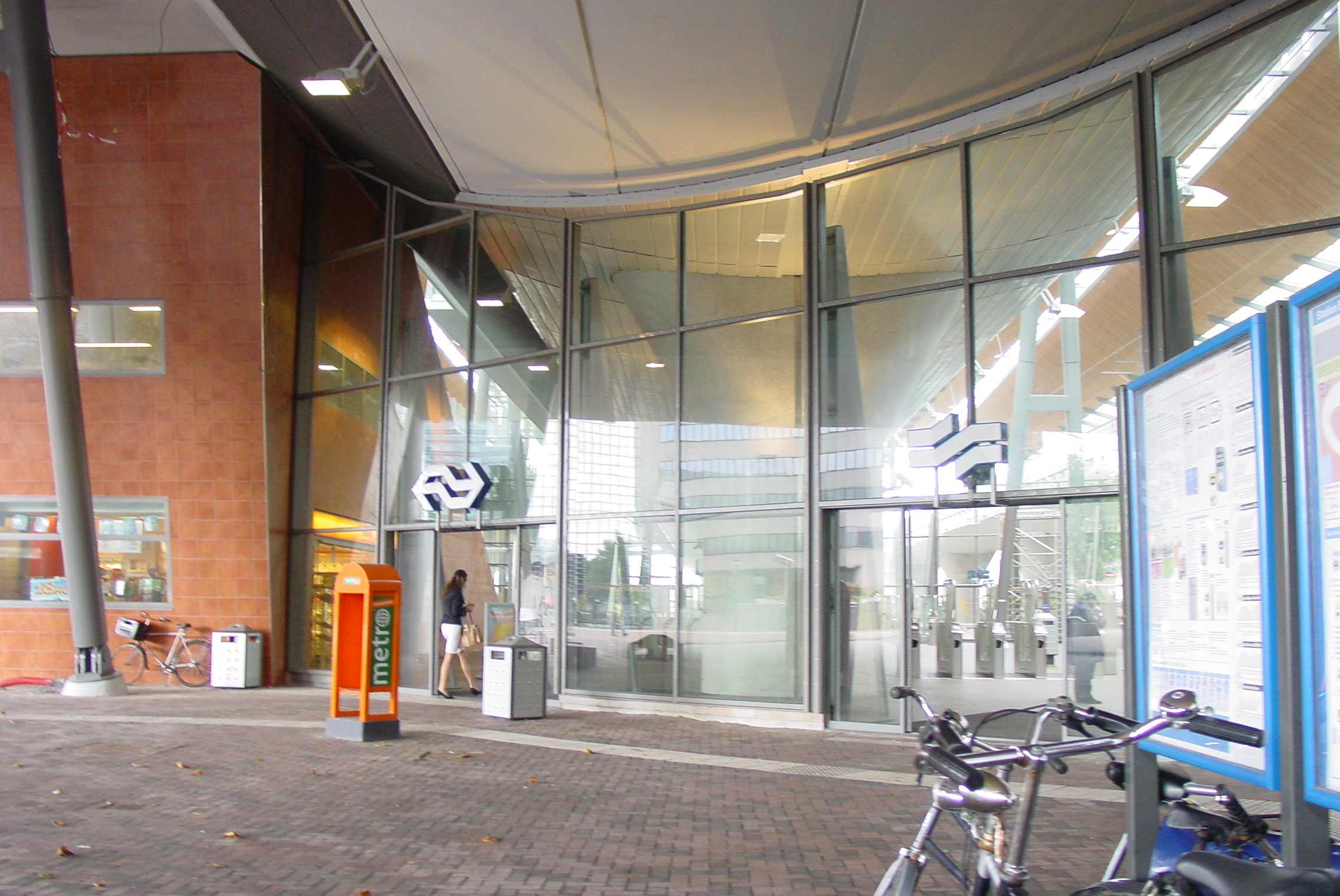
Entrance from the bus station (2007)

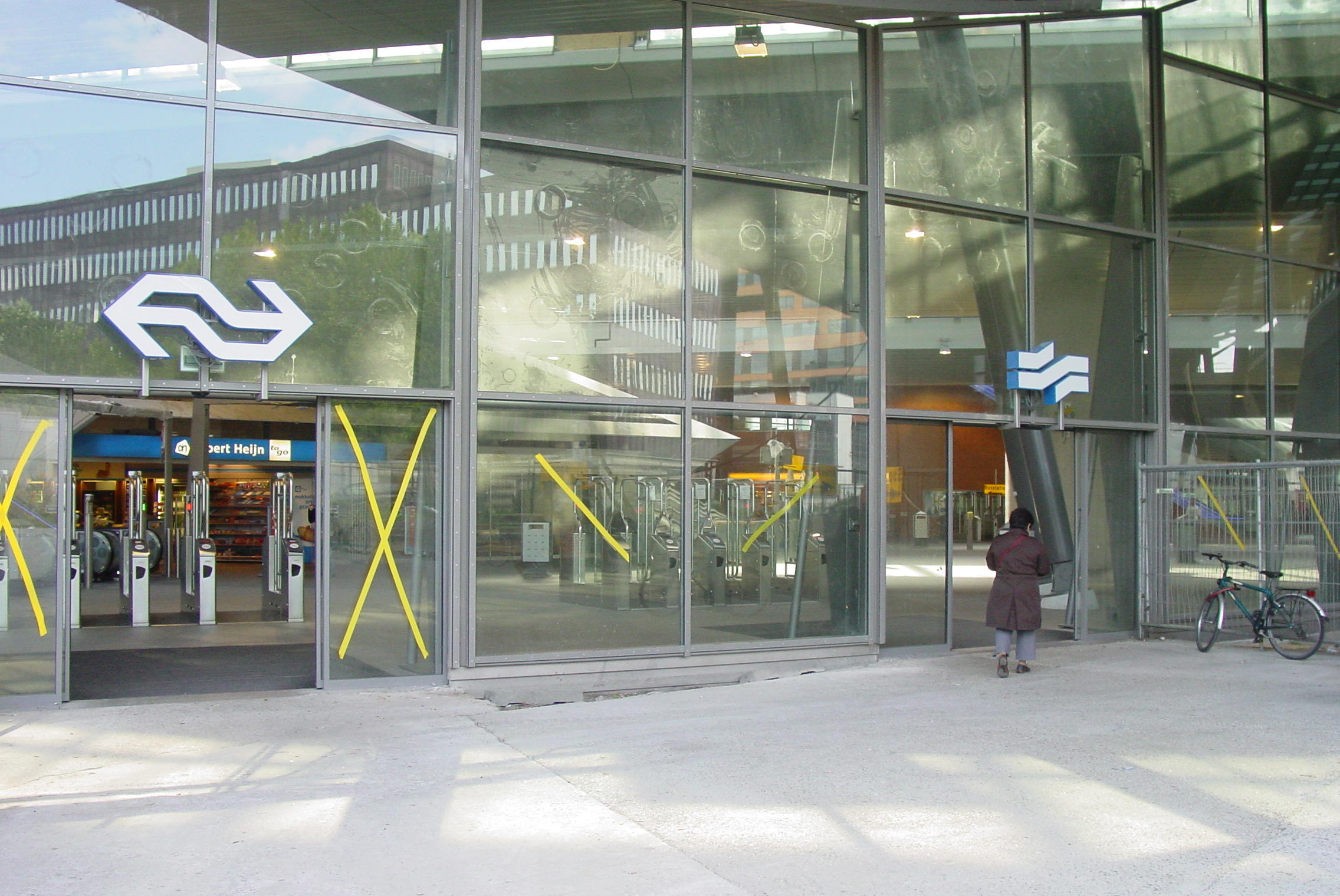
Entrance from the Amsterdamse Poort (2007)

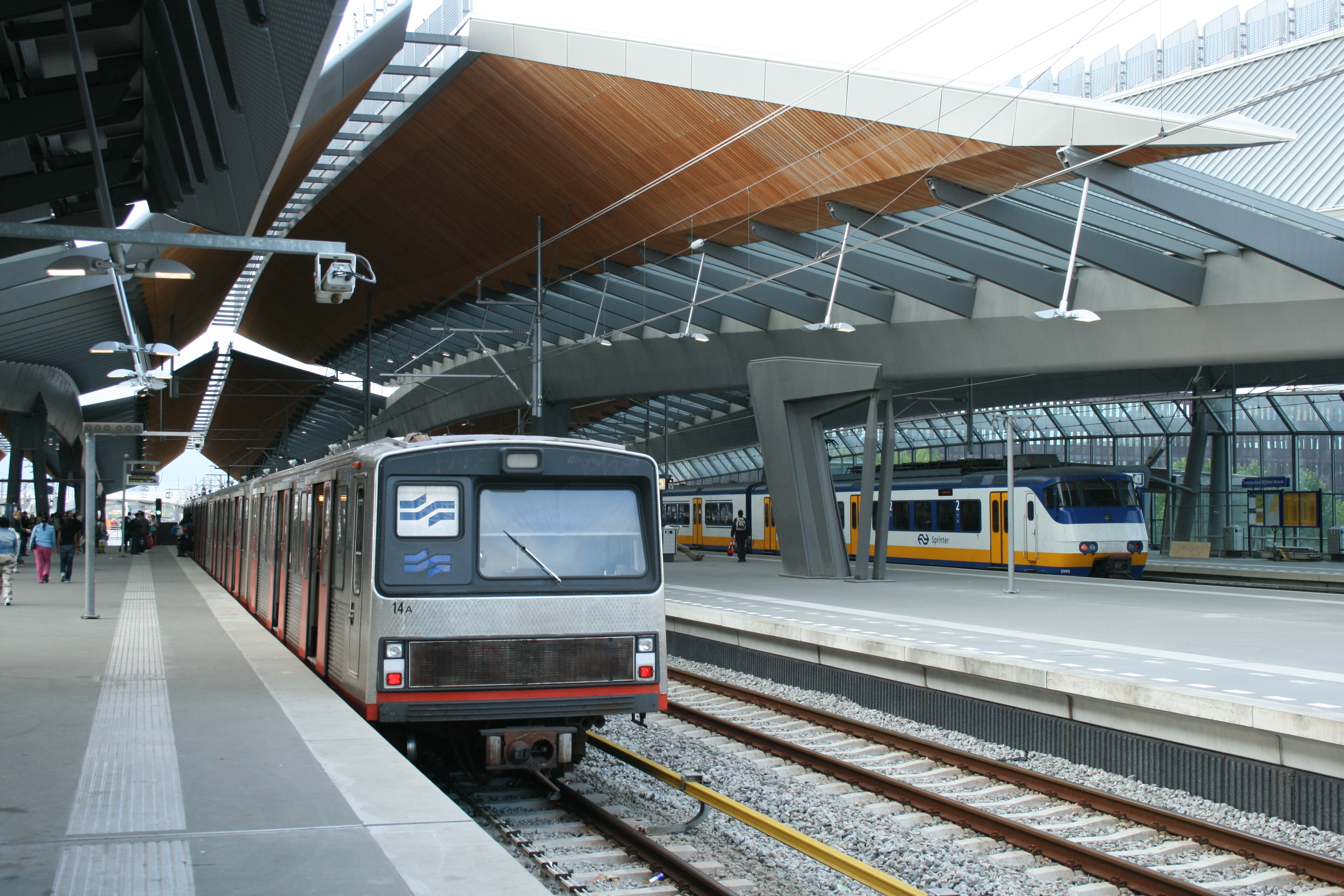
The station just before the 2007 re-opening.

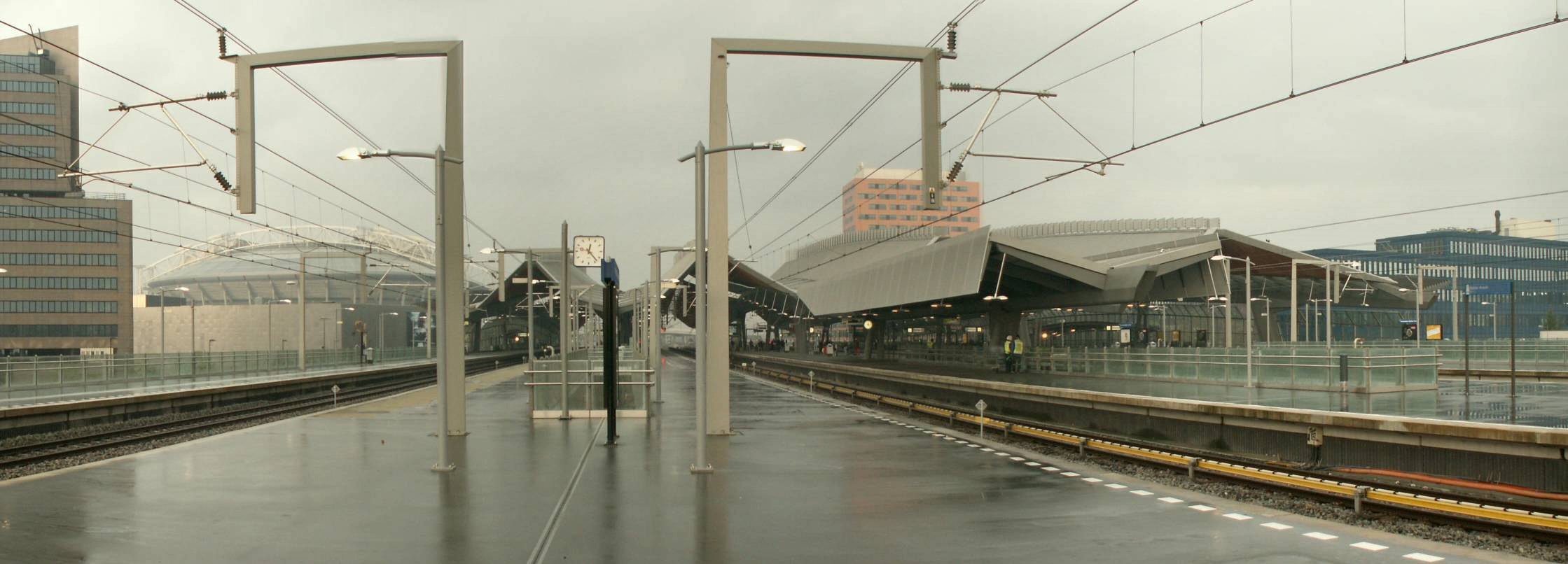
Station a few hours before the official (re)opening (November 17, 2007)
