= Strandvliet metro station =

Metro station in Amsterdam, Netherlands

Strandvliet
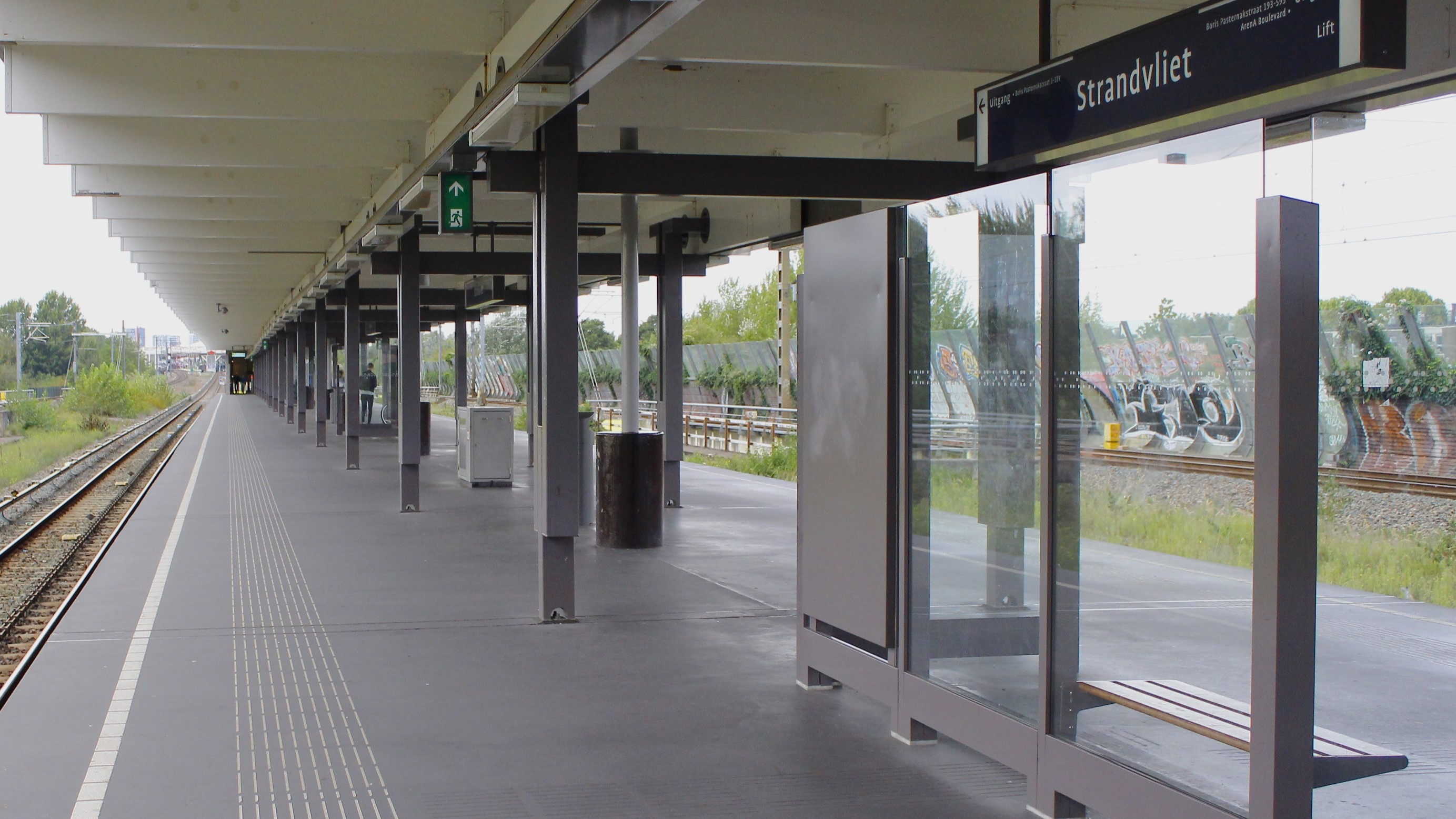

General information
- Location: Boris Pasternakstraat, Amsterdam; Netherlands
- Coordinates: 52°19′07″N 4°56′29″E
- Owner: GVB
- Platforms: Island platform
- Tracks: 2

Construction
- Structure type: Elevated

Other information
- Fare zone: 5715 (Oost) / 5725 (Zuidoost)

History
- Opened: 16 October 1977

Services
Preceding station	Amsterdam Metro	Following station
Station Duivendrecht towards Isolatorweg	Line 50	Station Bijlmer ArenA towards Gein
Station Duivendrecht towards Centraal Station	Line 54	Station Bijlmer ArenA towards Gein
Location

Strandvliet is an Amsterdam Metro station in the Venserpolder area of Amsterdam, Netherlands. The station opened in 1977 and is served by 2 lines, the 50 (Isolatorweg - Gein) and 54 (Amsterdam Centraal - Gein).

The metro station is only accessible with an OV-chipkaart or GVB Travel Pass.

Amsterdam Metro network

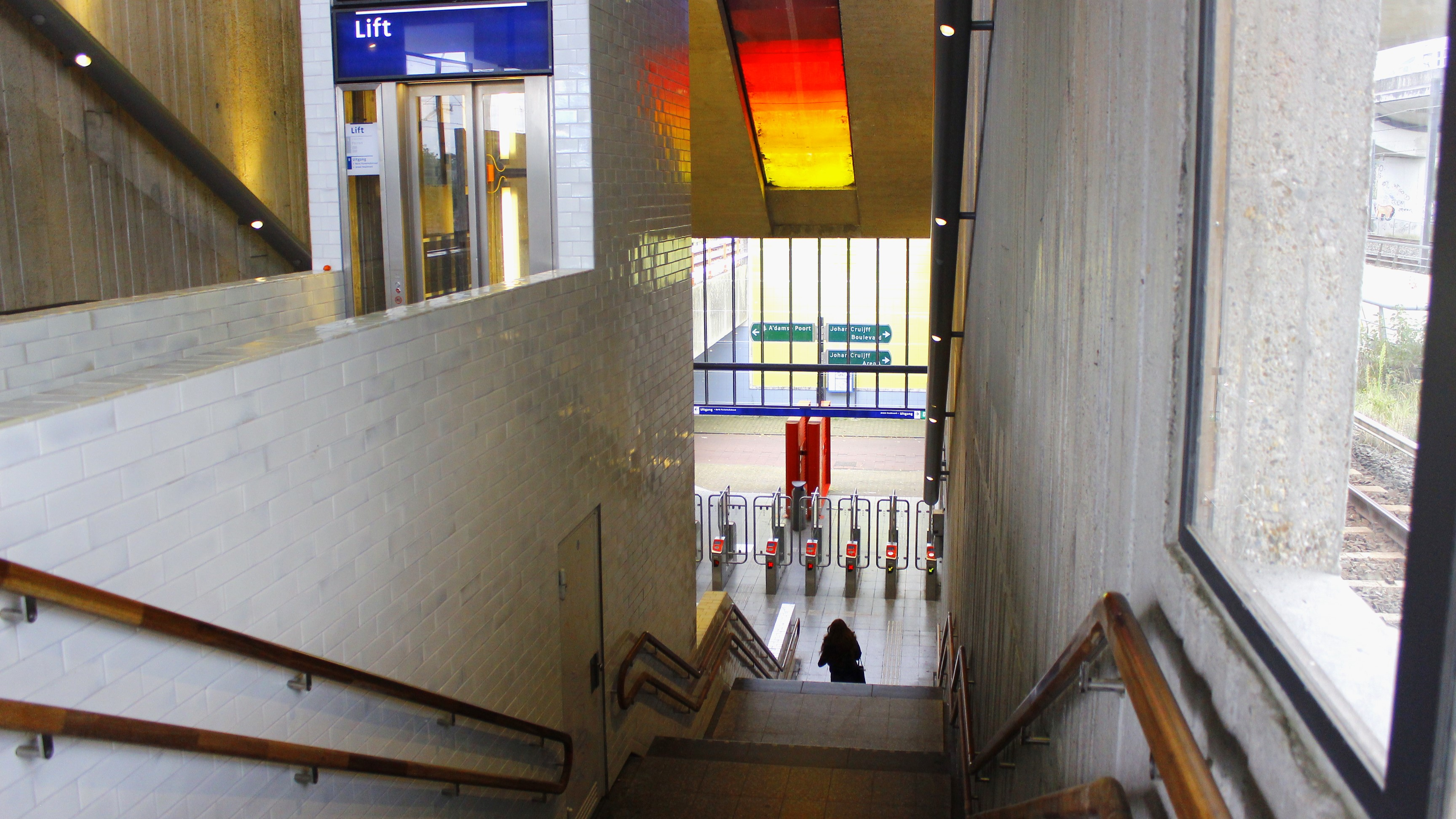
One of the entrances
