= Bullewijk metro station =

Metro station in Amsterdam

Bullewijk
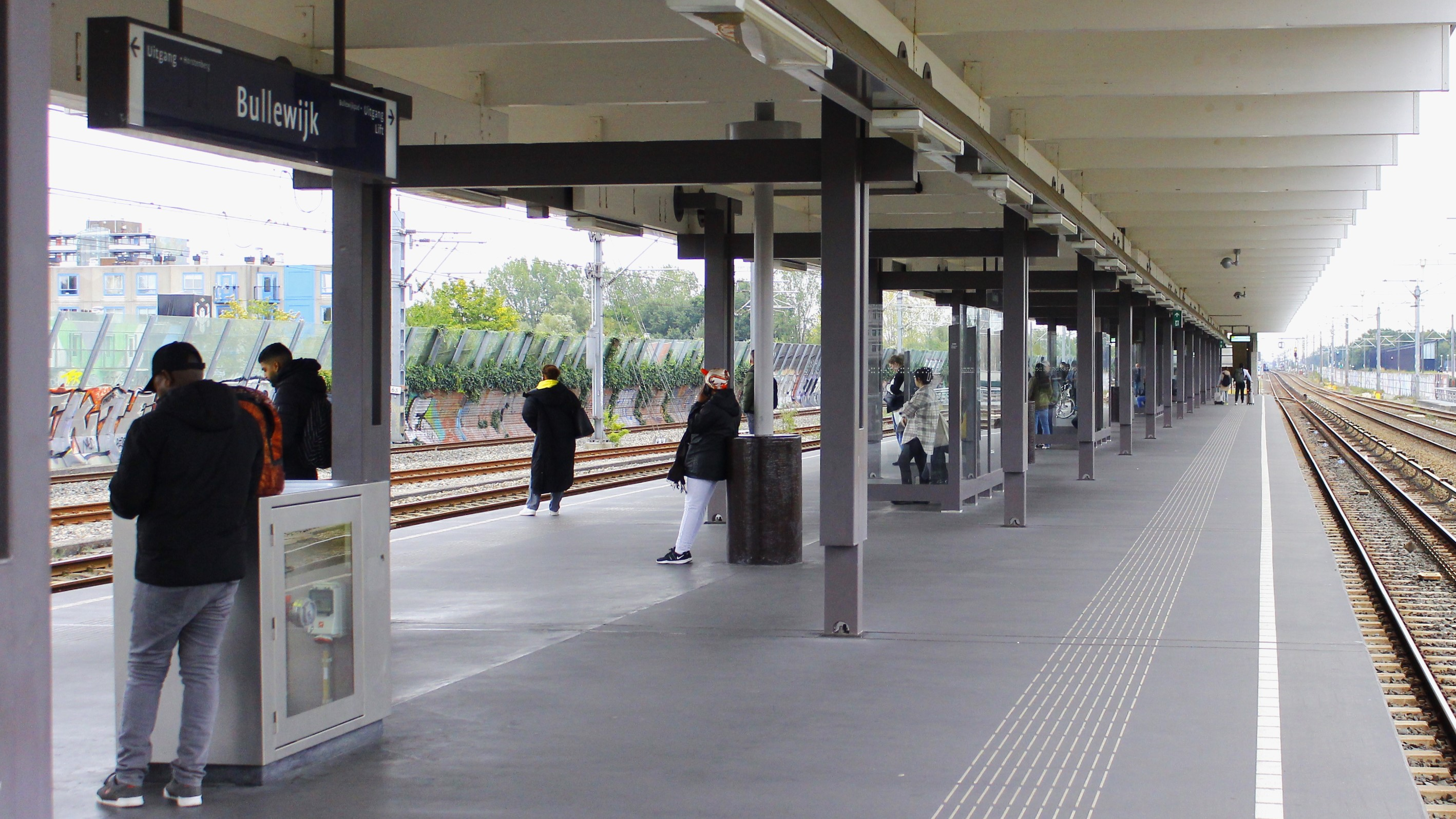

General information
- Location: Karspeldreef, Amsterdam; Netherlands
- Coordinates: 52°18′23″N 4°57′08″E
- Owner: GVB
- Platforms: Island platform
- Tracks: 2

Construction
- Structure type: Elevated

Other information
- Fare zone: 5715 (Oost) / 5725 (Zuidoost)

History
- Opened: 16 October 1977

Services
| Preceding station | Amsterdam Metro | Following station |
|---|---|---|
| Station Bijlmer ArenA towards Isolatorweg | Line 50 | Station Holendrecht towards Gein |
| Station Bijlmer ArenA towards Centraal Station | Line 54 | Station Holendrecht towards Gein |
Location

Bullewijk is an Amsterdam Metro station in the Bijlmermeer area of Amsterdam, Netherlands. It is located in the southeastern part of the city and forms part of the eastern branch of the metro network serving the district of Amsterdam-Zuidoost. The station opened in 1977 as part of the expansion of the Amsterdam metro system into the Bijlmermeer, a large residential area that was being developed during the 1960s and 1970s.

The station is served by two metro lines: the 50 (Isolatorweg - Gein) and the 54 (Amsterdam Centraal - Gein). Line 50 provides an east–west connection across the city, linking the southeastern districts with western industrial and residential areas, while line 54 connects the city center at Amsterdam Centraal with the southeastern suburbs. These services make Bullewijk an important stop for commuters and residents traveling between Amsterdam-Zuidoost and other parts of the city.

Bullewijk station is situated near several office complexes and commercial areas, including the Amsterdam Arena district and business parks that developed in the surrounding area during the late 20th and early 21st centuries. As a result, the station serves both local residents and workers commuting to nearby offices.

The metro station is only accessible with an OV-chipkaart or GVB Travel Pass. These electronic ticketing systems are used throughout the public transport network in the Netherlands and are required to enter and exit the station through the automated fare gates.

Amsterdam Metro network

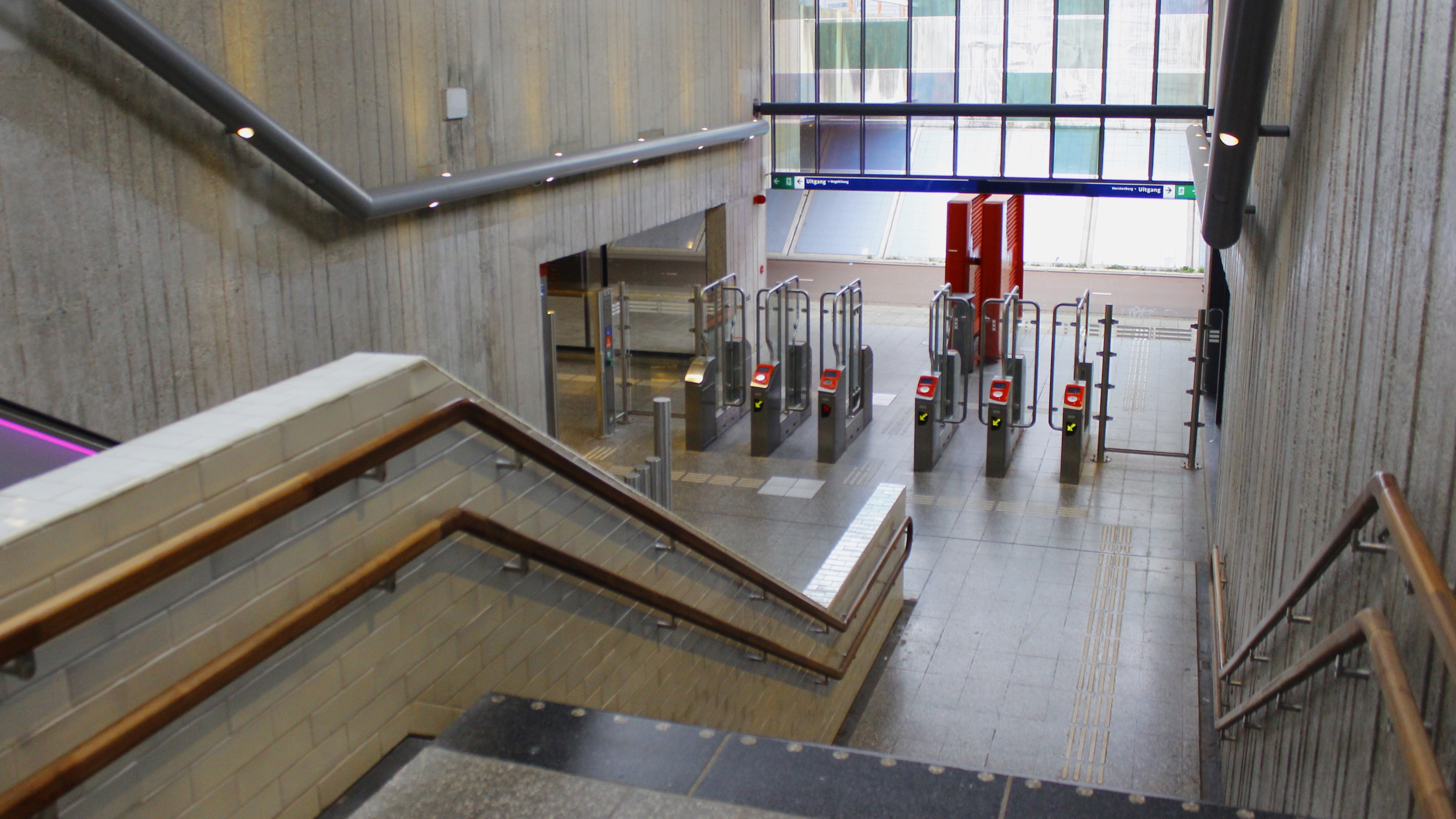
One of the station entrances
