= Amsterdam Holendrecht station =

Metro and railway station in Amsterdam

Amsterdam Holendrecht
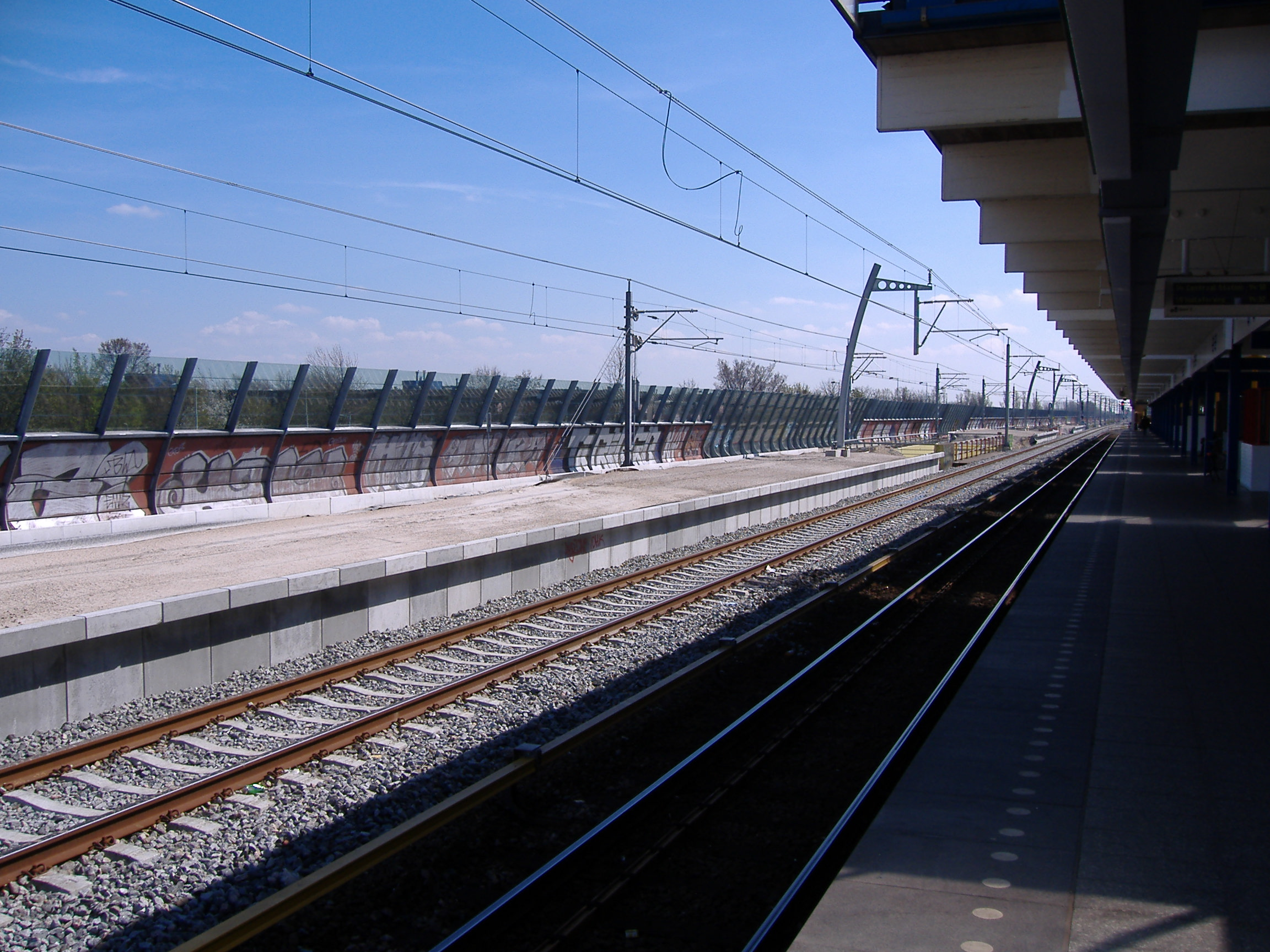
- The platforms under construction

General information
- Location: Netherlands
- Coordinates: 52°17′51″N 4°57′36″E

History
- Opened: 14 December 2008

Services
Preceding station	Nederlandse Spoorwegen	Following station
Amsterdam Bijlmer ArenA towards Uitgeest	NS Sprinter 4000	Abcoude towards Rotterdam Centraal
Amsterdam Bijlmer ArenA towards Uitgeest	NS Sprinter 7400 Peak hours only	Abcoude towards Driebergen-Zeist
Preceding station	Amsterdam Metro	Following station
Bullewijk towards Isolatorweg	Line 50	Reigersbos towards Gein
Bullewijk towards Centraal Station	Line 54	Reigersbos towards Gein
Location
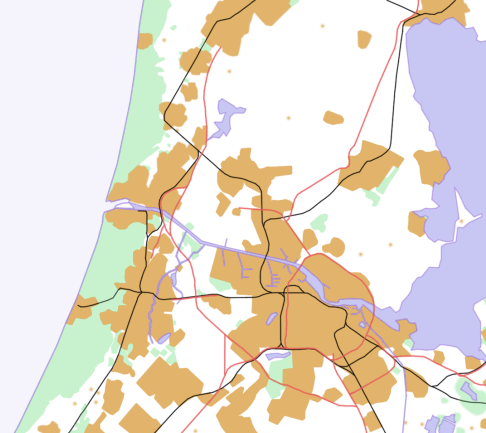
- Location within Northern Randstad Location within Netherlands

Amsterdam Holendrecht is a railway and metro station in Amsterdam, Netherlands.

The station opened on 14 December 2008. Before that date, Holendrecht was a station on the Amsterdam Metro network which was opened on 16 October 1977 and is now served by two lines, the 50 and 54. It is located in Amsterdam-Zuidoost and it lies on the Amsterdam – Utrecht main line, between Amsterdam Bijlmer ArenA and Abcoude. The station is near the Academic Medical Center.

== Train services ==
The following train services currently call at Amsterdam Holendrecht:

- 2x per hour local service (Sprinter) from Uitgeest to Amsterdam, Breukelen, Woerden and Rotterdam
- 2x per hour local service (Sprinter) from Amsterdam to Breukelen, Utrecht and Rhenen (peak hours only)

== Metro services ==
- 50 (from Isolatorweg to Sloterdijk, Lelylaan, Zuid, Duivendrecht, Bijlmer ArenA, Holendrecht and Gein)
- 54 (from Centraal to Amstel, Duivendrecht, Bijlmer ArenA, Holendrecht and Gein)

== Bus services ==
The following services call at Holendrecht:

=== City services ===
These services are operated by GVB.

- 41 Holendrecht – Kraaiennest – Ganzenhoef – Duivendrecht – Watergraafsmeer – Muiderpoortstation
- 47 Holendrecht – Reigersbos – Gein – Gaasperplas – Kraaiennest – Station Bijlmer ArenA

=== Regional services ===
These services are operated by EBS, branded as Bizzliner. They operate Monday to Friday only.

- 375 Amsterdam Holendrecht – Amsterdam Bijlmermeer – Diemen – Schouw – Ilpendam – Purmerend Weidevenne (Afternoon rush hours only)
- 376 Amsterdam Holendrecht – Amsterdam Bijlmermeer – Diemen – Schouw – Watergang – Ilpendam – Purmerend Overwhere – Purmerend P+R N244
- 377 Amsterdam Holendrecht – Amsterdam Bijlmermeer – Diemen – Schouw – Ilpendam – Purmerend de Purmer (Afternoon rush hours only)
- 378 Amsterdam Holendrecht – Amsterdam Bijlmermeer – Diemen – Schouw – Broek in Waterland – Monnickendam – Edam – Volendam (Afternoon rush hours only)

== Gallery ==
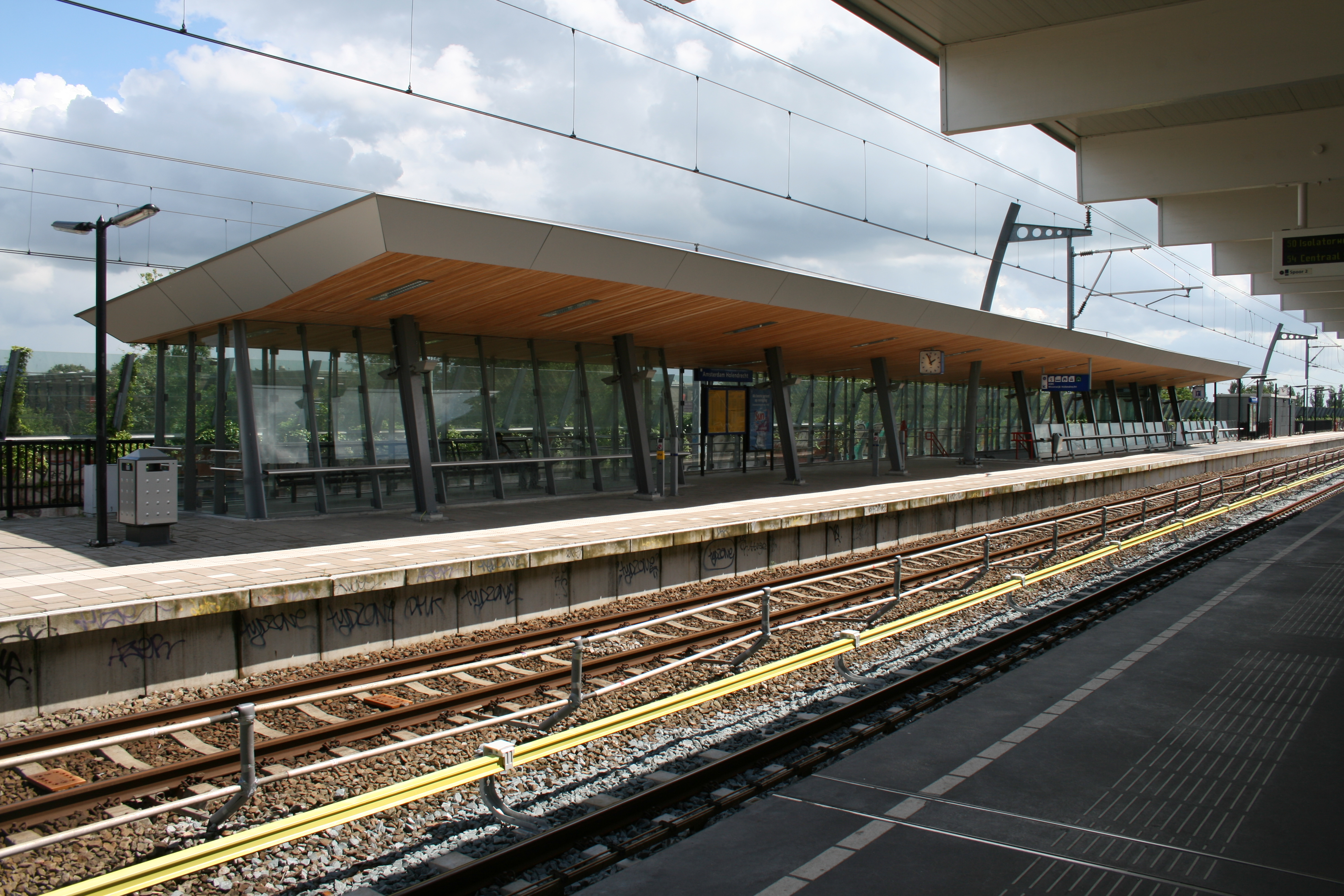
Covered eastern platform as seen from the metro station

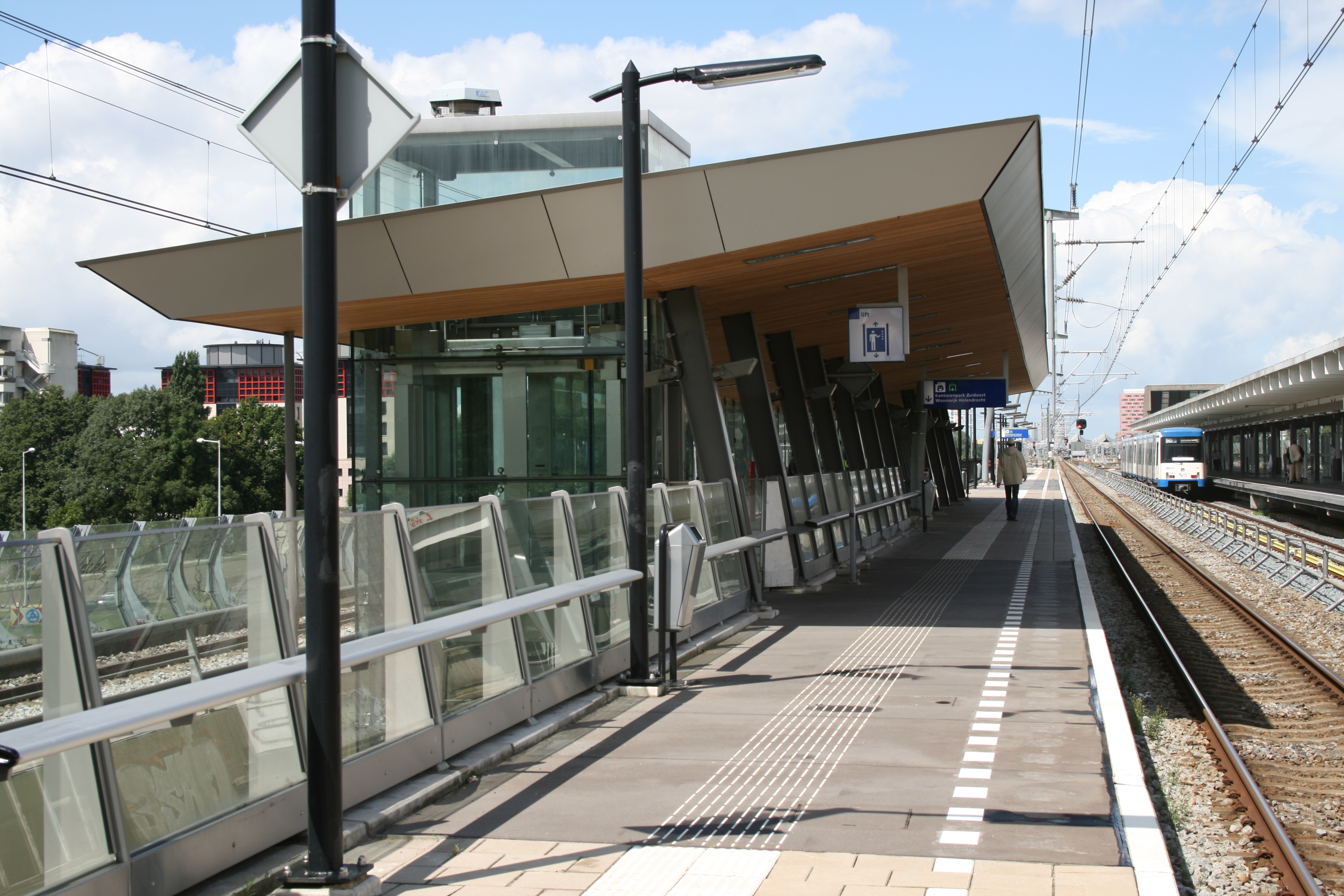
Western platform cover

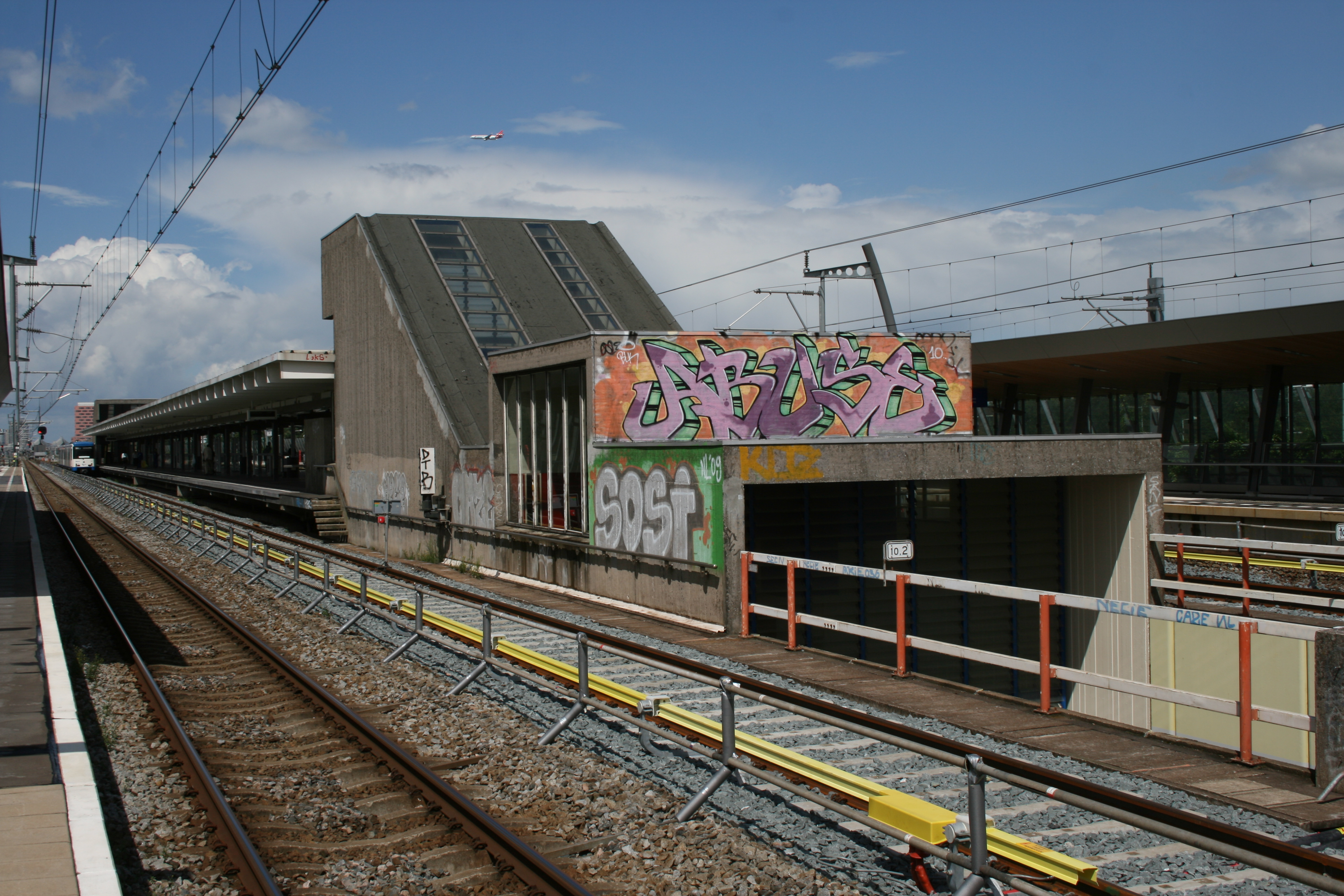
The metro station of GVB, dating from 1977

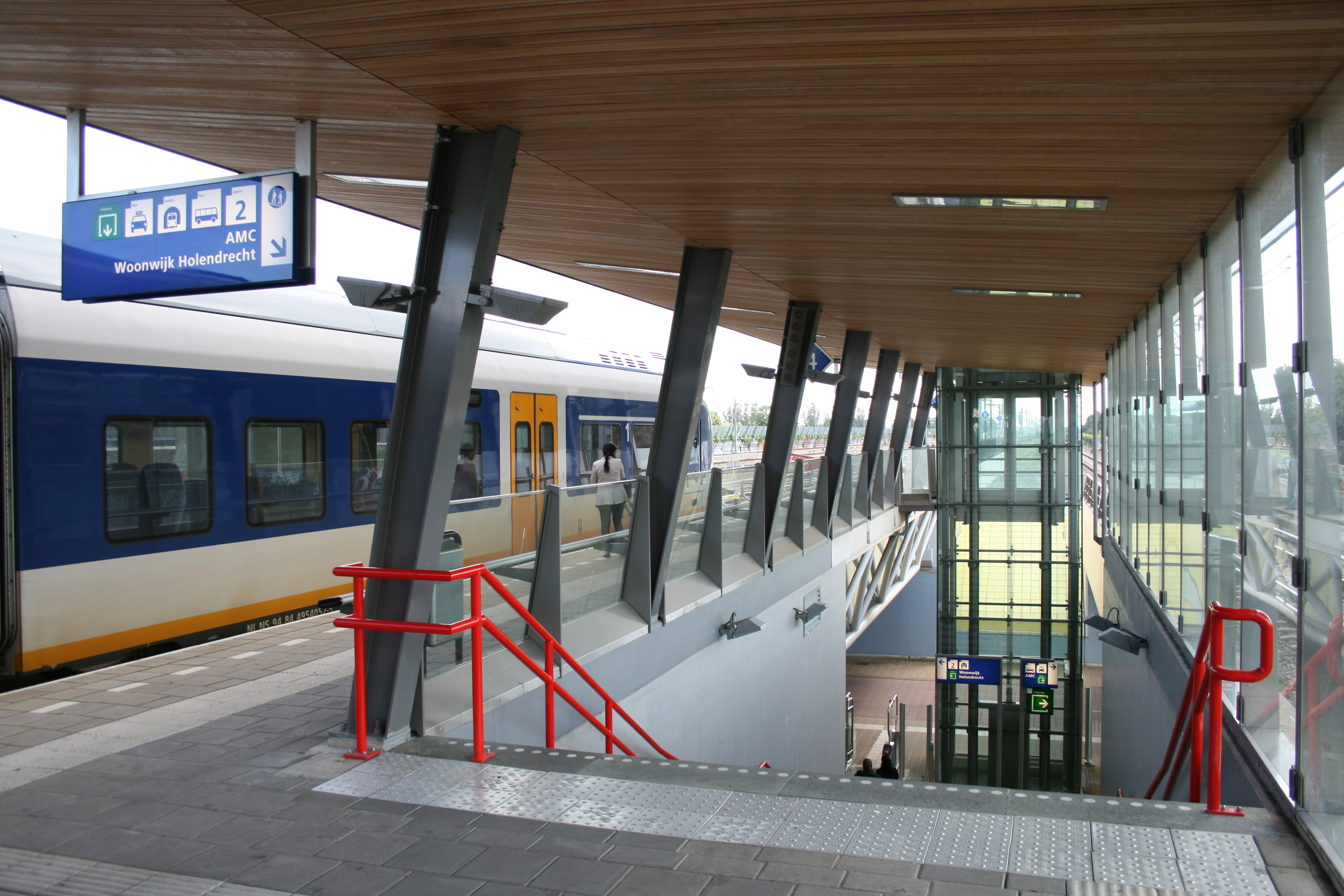
Covering the eastern platform seen in a southerly direction
