= Abcoude railway station =

Railway station in Abcoude, the Netherlands

Abcoude
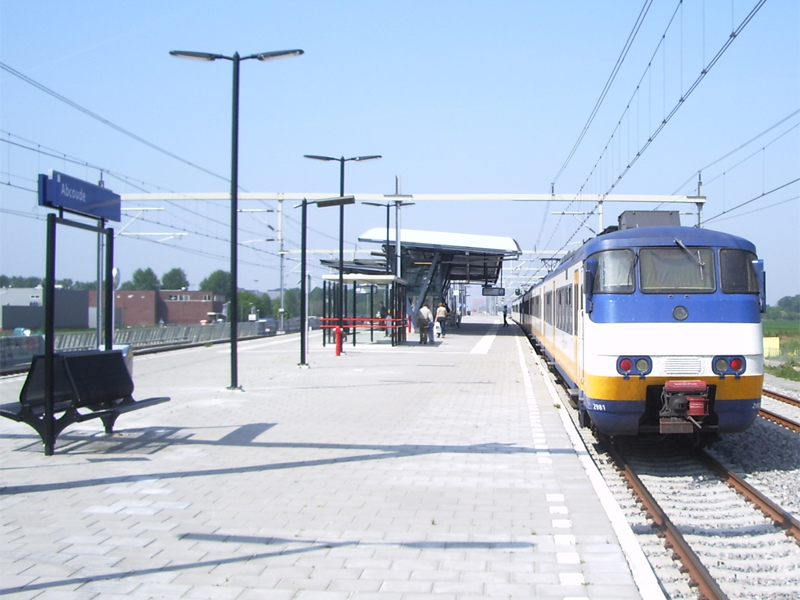

General information
- Location: Netherlands
- Coordinates: 52°16′28″N 4°58′56″E
- Line: Amsterdam–Arnhem railway

History
- Opened: 18 December 1843

Services
Preceding station	Nederlandse Spoorwegen	Following station
Amsterdam Holendrecht towards Uitgeest	NS Sprinter 4000	Breukelen towards Rotterdam Centraal
Amsterdam Holendrecht towards Uitgeest	NS Sprinter 7400 Peak hours only	Breukelen towards Driebergen-Zeist
Location
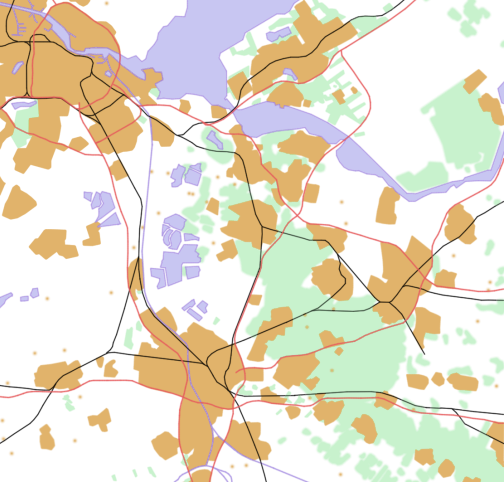
- Location within Northeastern Randstad

Abcoude is a railway station located in Abcoude, Netherlands.

== History ==
The station is located on the Amsterdam–Arnhem railway between Amsterdam and Utrecht, and was opened on 18 December 1843. Previously, there were only two trains a day going to Abcoude. The line was doubled to 4 tracks in 2007 and the old station closed with a new station opening a few hundred metres to the north. The old station stood next to the Gein with the line crossing the river by a bridge which was barely higher than the river level. During the quadrupling of the line a new underpass was built to take the railway under the river. This new underpass begins just after the current station and emerges back at ground level a good distance past the original station buildings.

== Accidents and incidents ==
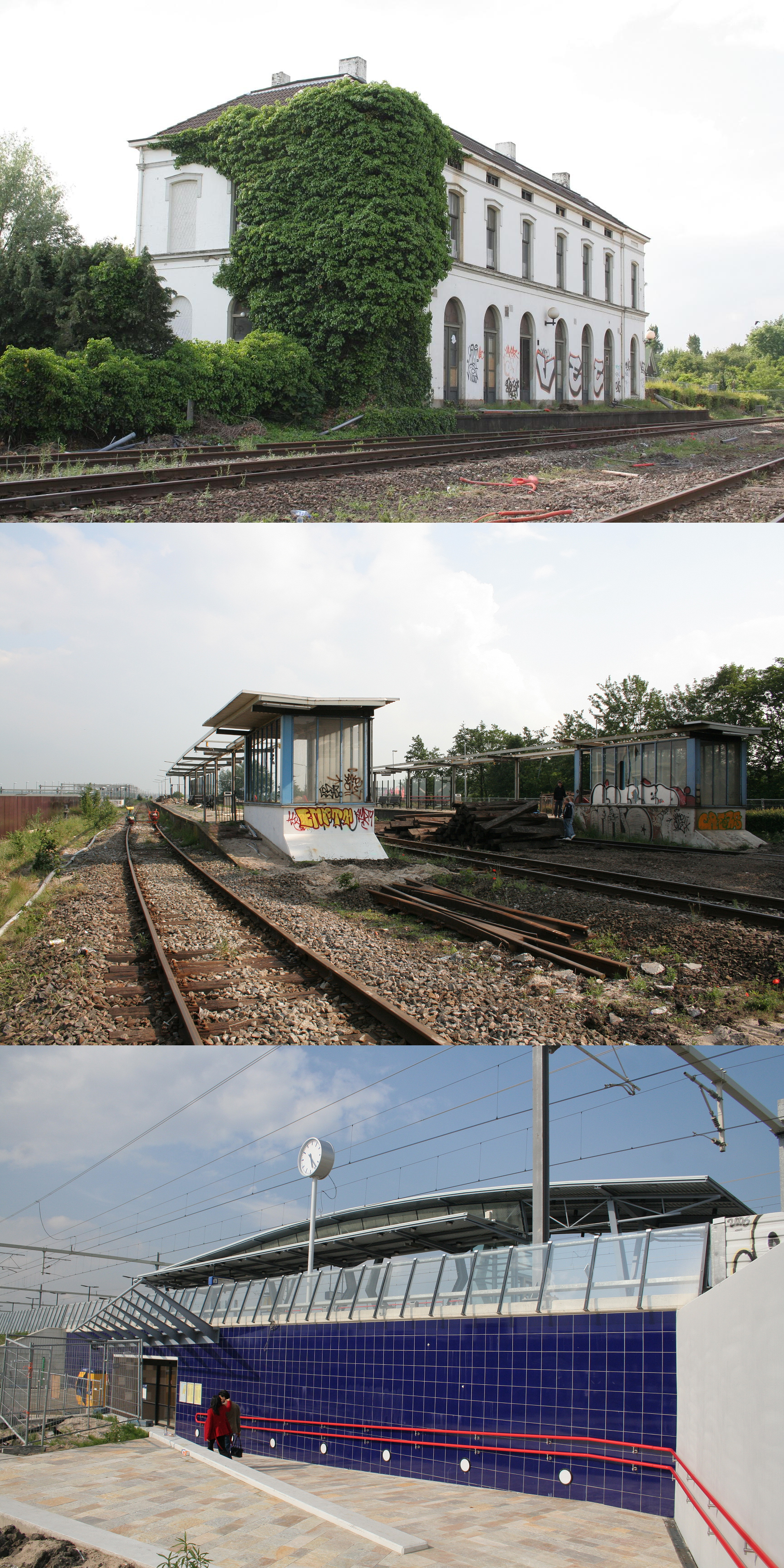
Station Abcoude

On 12 March 2015, a passenger train caught fire at the station and was evacuated. Twenty-one passengers had breathed in smoke but could resume their journey, one passenger excluding the train driver was taken to the hospital.

== Train services ==
The following services currently call at Abcoude:

- 2x per hour local service (sprinter) Uitgeest – Amsterdam – Woerden – Rotterdam
- 2x per hour local service (sprinter) Uitgeest – Amsterdam – Utrecht – Rhenen (Not in the evening and the weekend)
