= Reigersbos metro station =

Metro station in Amsterdam, Netherlands

Reigersbos
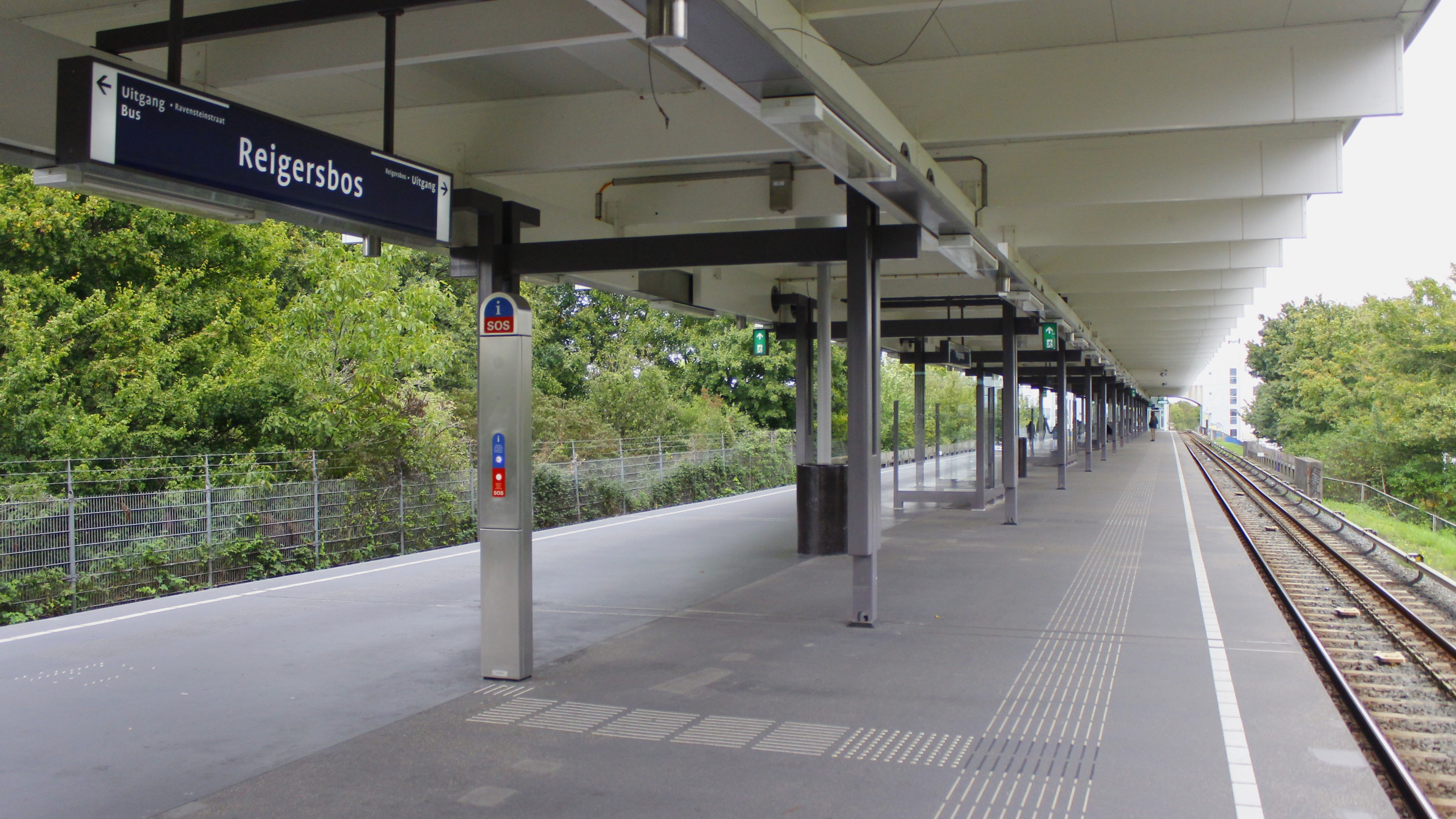

General information
- Location: Reigersbosdreef, Amsterdam; Netherlands
- Coordinates: 52°17′44″N 4°58′28″E
- Owner: GVB
- Platforms: Island platform
- Tracks: 2
- Connections: 47, N85

Construction
- Structure type: Elevated

Other information
- Fare zone: 5725 (Zuidoost)

History
- Opened: 27 August 1982

Services
Preceding station	Amsterdam Metro	Following station
Station Holendrecht towards Isolatorweg	Line 50	Gein Terminus
Station Holendrecht towards Centraal Station	Line 54	Gein Terminus
Location

Reigersbos is an Amsterdam Metro station in the Gaasperdam area of Amsterdam, Netherlands. The station opened in 1982 and is served by 2 lines, the 50 (Isolatorweg - Gein) and 54 (Amsterdam Centraal - Gein).

The metro station is only accessible with an OV-chipkaart, GVB Travel Pass or paying by cash.

Amsterdam Metro network

== Bus services ==
- 47 Station Bijlmer ArenA - Bijlmermeer - Gaasperplas - Gaasperdam - Station Holendrecht
- N85 Gein - Gaasperplas - Station Bijlmer ArenA - Weesperplein - Rembrandtplein - Dam - Centraal Station (Nightservice)
