= Venserpolder =

Coordinates: 52°19′15″N 4°56′37″E

- Neighborhood of Amsterdam
- Interactive map of Venserpolder
- Country: Netherlands
- Province: North Holland
- COROP: Amsterdam
- Time zone: UTC+1 (CET)

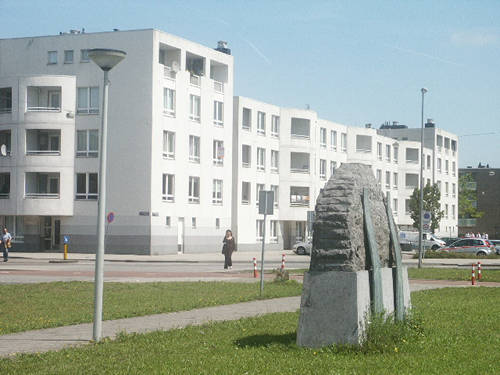
View of Venserpolder.

Venserpolder is a neighborhood of Amsterdam, Netherlands.
