= Gaasperdam =

Coordinates: 52°18′29″N 4°59′34″E

- Neighborhood of Amsterdam
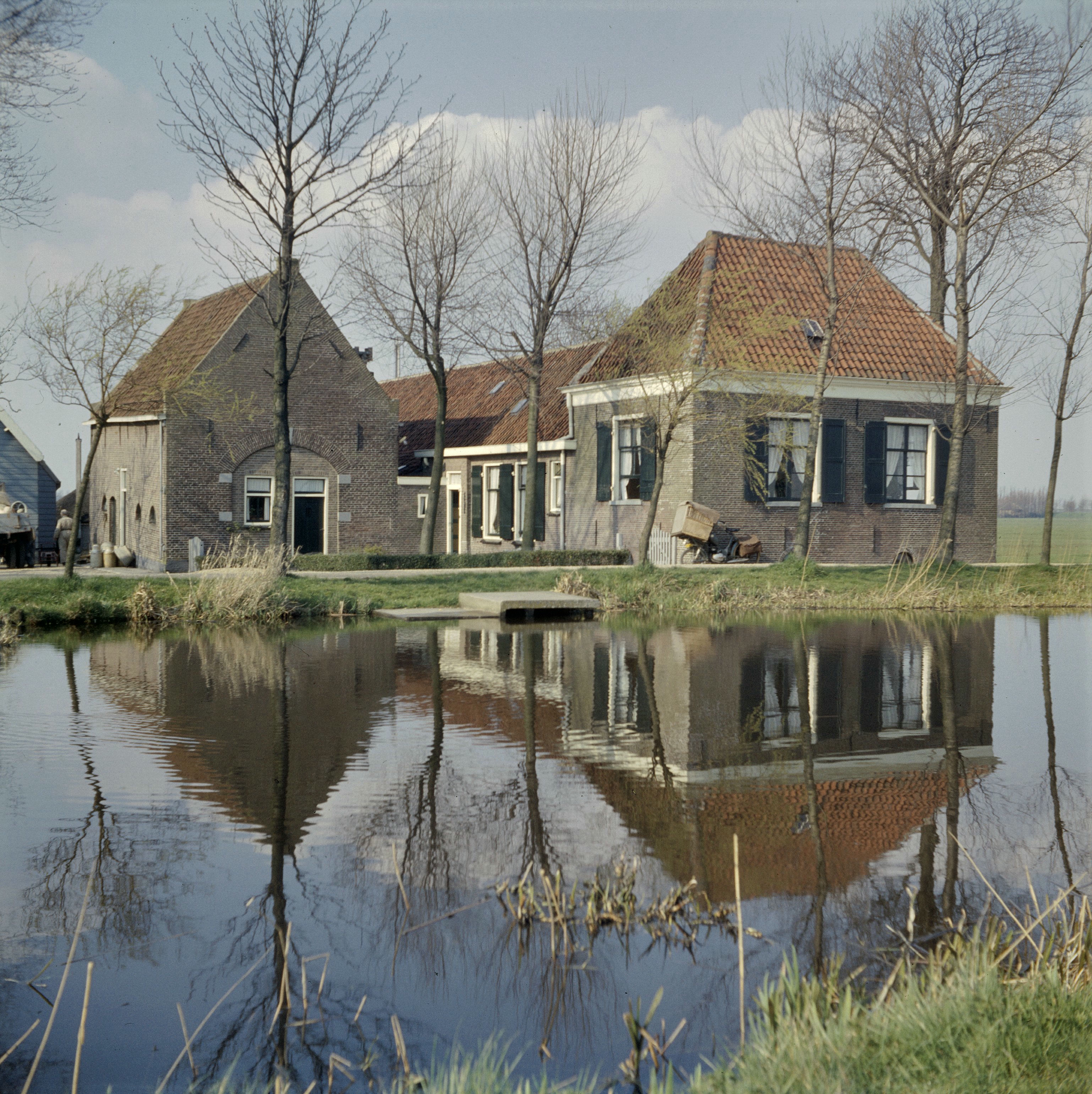
- Interactive map of Gaasperdam
- Country: Netherlands
- Province: North Holland
- COROP: Amsterdam
- Time zone: UTC+1 (CET)

Gaasperdam is a neighborhood of Amsterdam, Netherlands in the Zuidoost (southeastern) borough of the city.
