= Gein metro station =

Metro station in Amsterdam, Netherlands

Gein
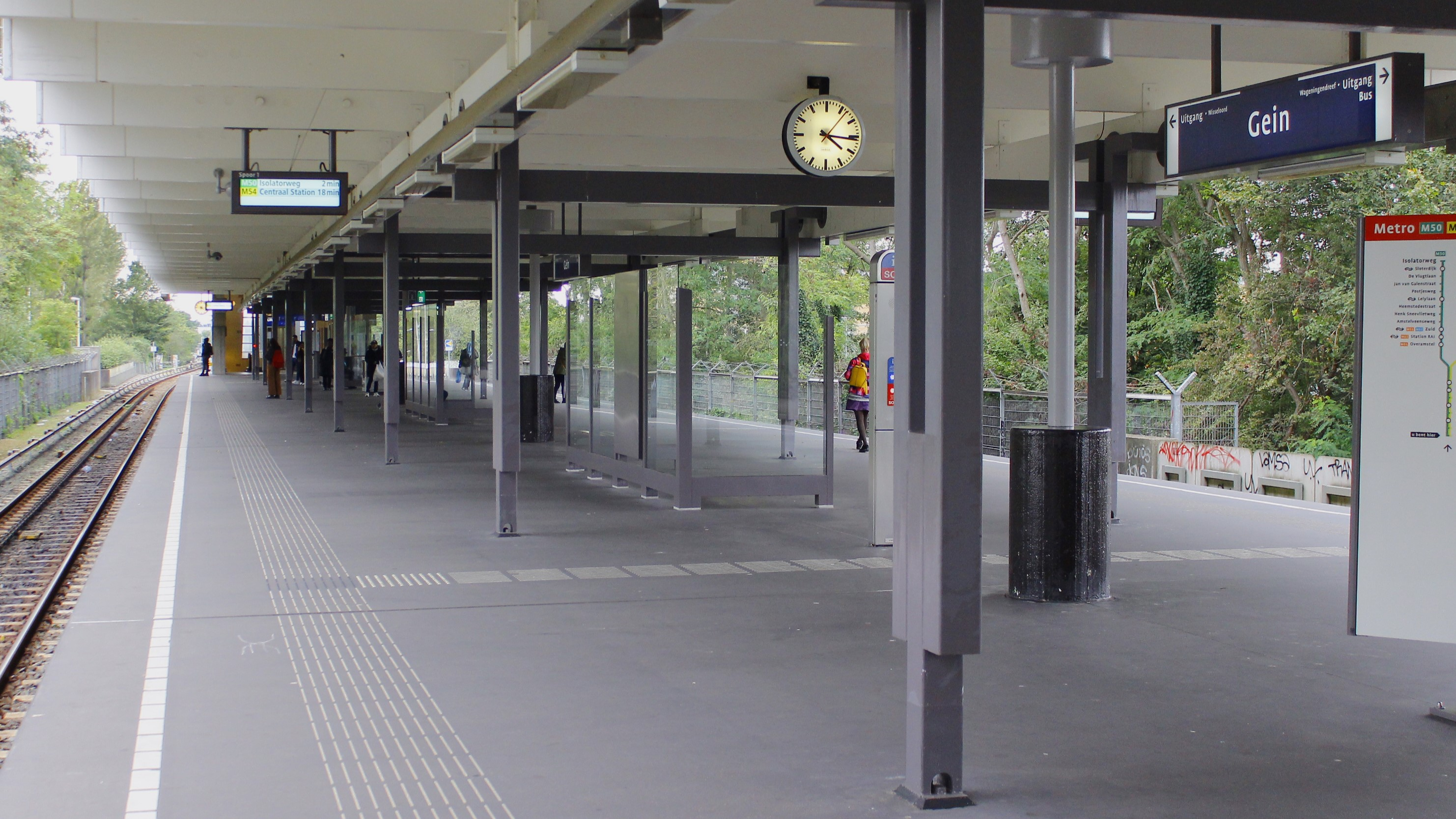

General information
- Location: Wageningendreef, Amsterdam; Netherlands
- Coordinates: 52°17′47″N 4°59′21″E
- Owner: GVB
- Platforms: Island platform
- Tracks: 2

Construction
- Structure type: Elevated

Other information
- Fare zone: 5725 (Zuidoost)

History
- Opened: 27 August 1982

Services
Preceding station	Amsterdam Metro	Following station
Reigersbos towards Isolatorweg	Line 50	Terminus
Reigersbos towards Centraal Station	Line 54	Terminus
Location

Gein is an Amsterdam Metro station in the Gaasperdam area of Amsterdam, Netherlands. The station opened in 1982 and is served by 2 lines, the 50 (Isolatorweg - Gein) and 54 (Amsterdam Centraal - Gein).

The metro station is only accessible with an OV-chipkaart or GVB Travel Pass.

Amsterdam Metro network

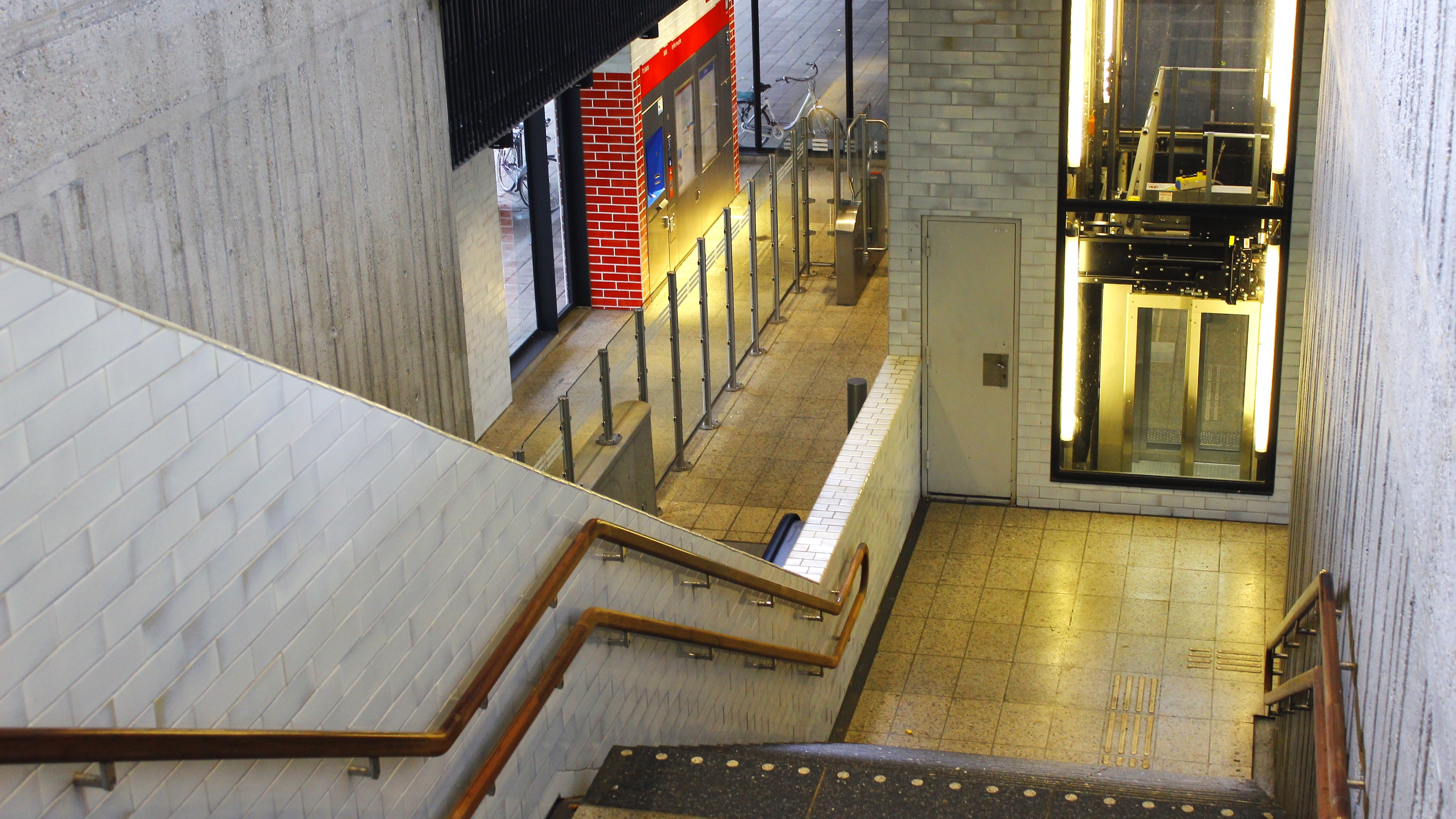
One of the station entrances

== Bus services ==
- 47 Station Bijlmer ArenA - Bijlmermeer - Gaasperplas - Gaasperdam - Station Holendrecht
- N85 Gein - Gaasperplas - Station Bijlmer ArenA - Weesperplein - Rembrandtplein - Dam - Centraal Station (Nightservice)
