= Gaasperplas =

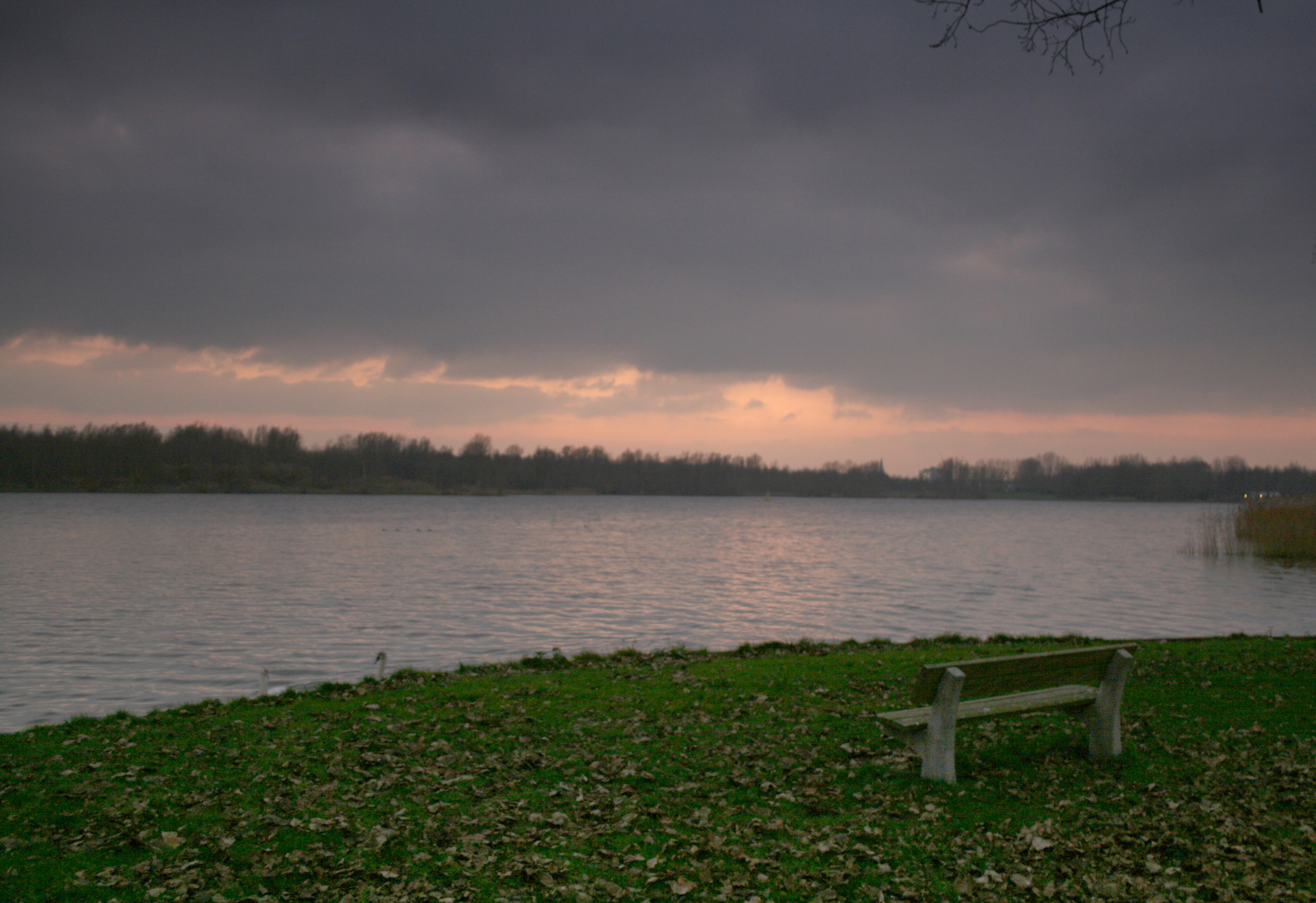

- Location within Netherlands
- Coordinates: 52°18′20″N 4°59′30″E
- Type: artificial lake
- Basin countries: Netherlands
- Max. depth: 35 m (115 ft)

Gaasperplas is an artificial lake used for recreational purposes south-east of Amsterdam in the Netherlands.

Gaasperplas was created with the extraction of sand for the construction of the Bijlmer. At its deepest the lake is 35 metres deep. It was the setting for the 1982 Floriade landscape and flower show, and the Eastern end of the lake is surrounded by parks and woodlands that once formed part of the event.

The lake hosts a Sailing club, Canoe, Windsurfing and Dragon Boat facilities, is popular with anglers, and has a sheltered public beach on the south shore. The section for naturism (officially since 2005) lies on the northern side. One of Amsterdam's principal campsites is located in the area.

It is not connected to the navigable canals system, and has a prohibition against the use of motorised boats; these two factors contribute towards a good water quality and abundance of wildlife. A public slipway is available for non-motorised pleasure and fishing craft.

One of Amsterdam's metro lines terminates at the station of the same name located near the north shore of the lake.

== Gallery ==
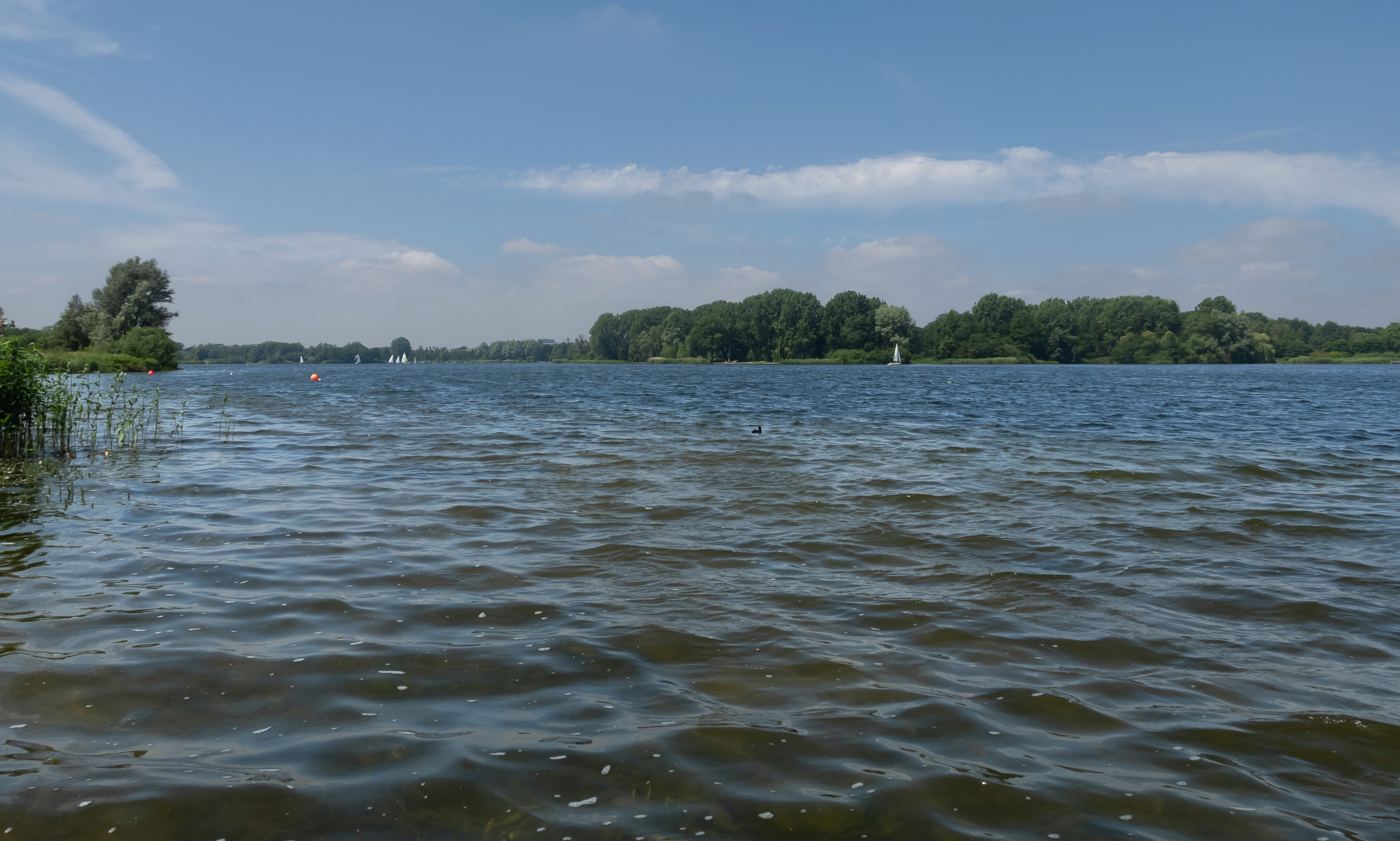

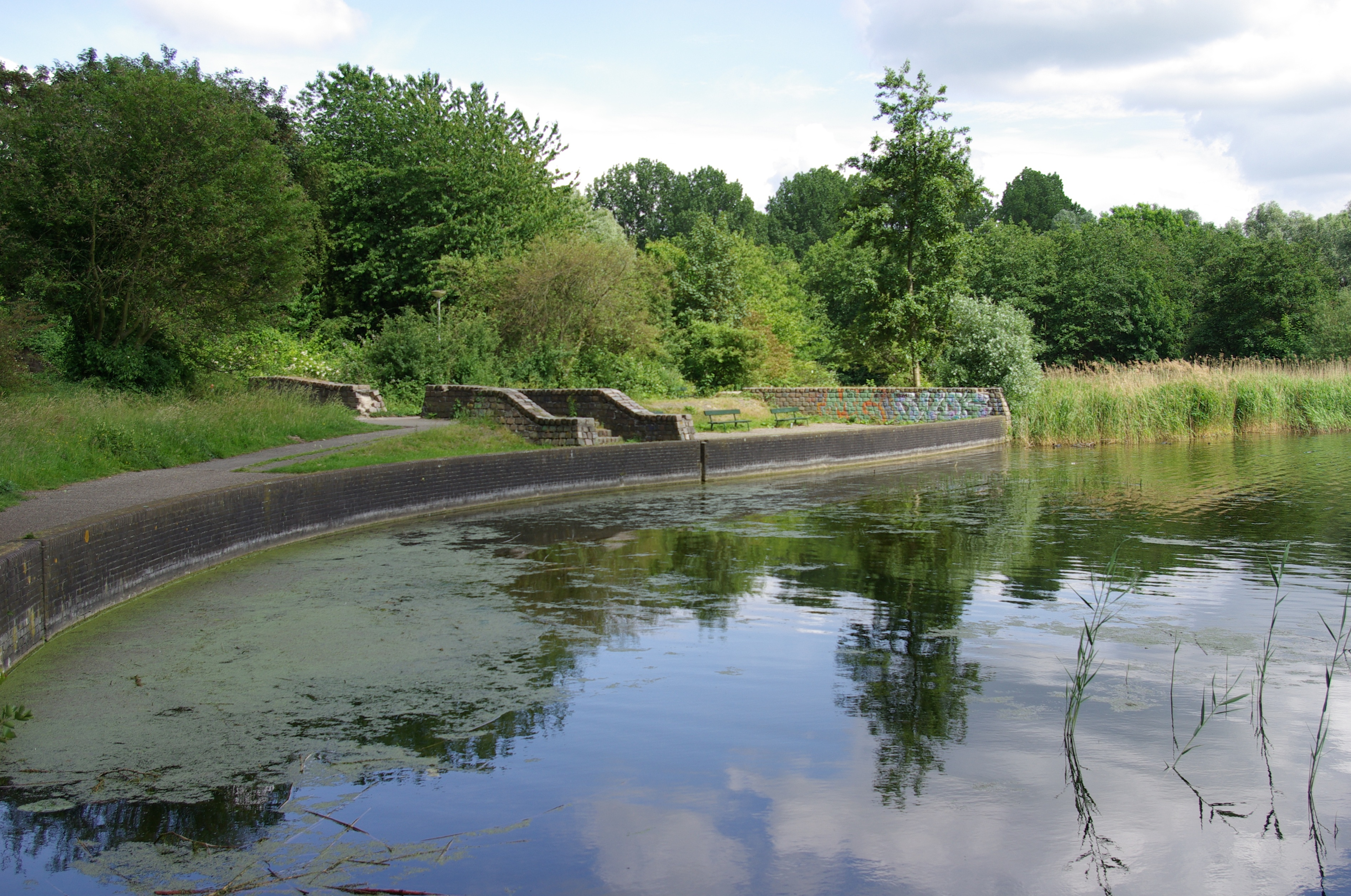

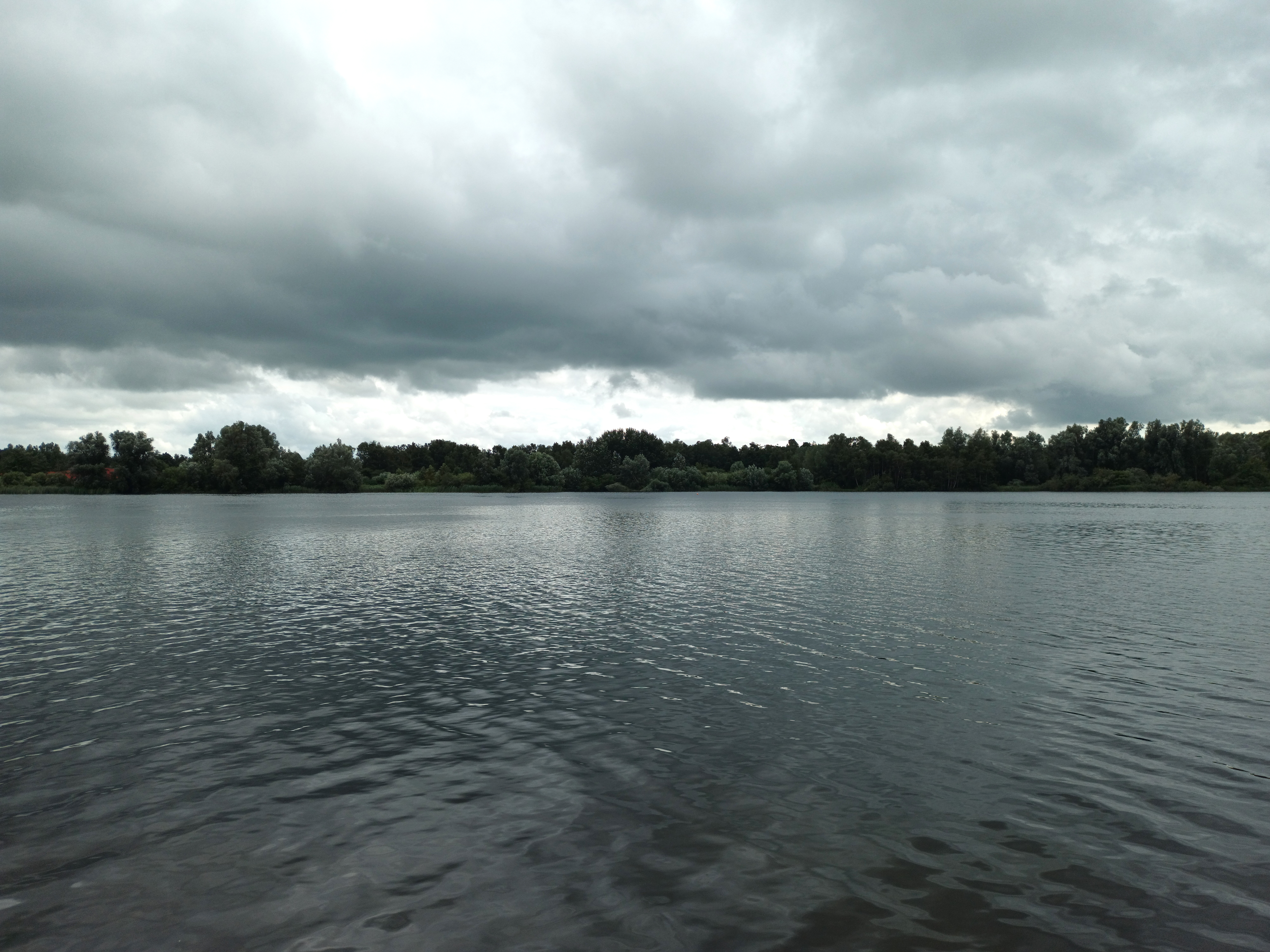

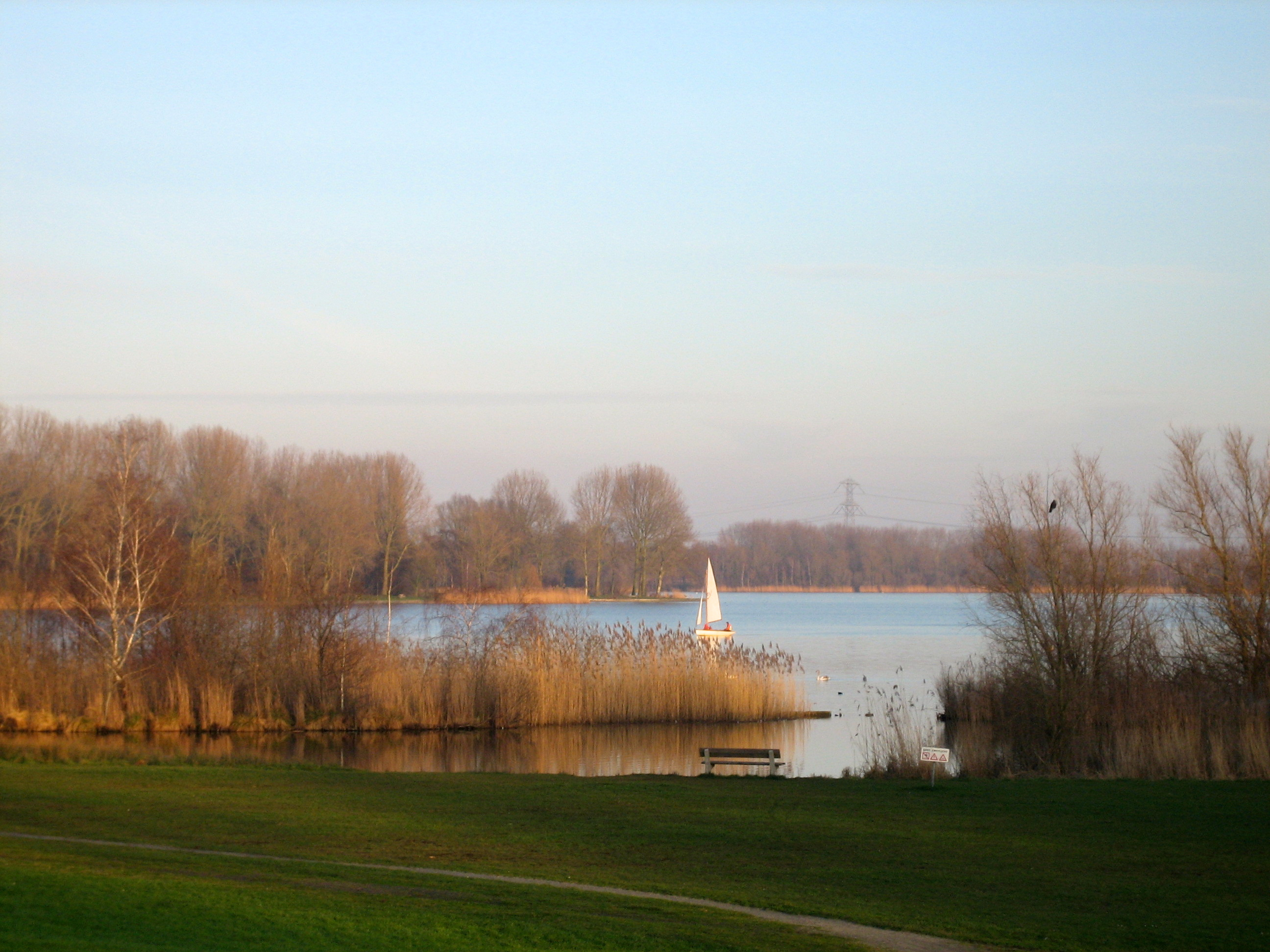
