= Ganzenhoef metro station =

Metro station in Amsterdam

Coordinates: 52°19′25″N 4°58′23″E

Ganzenhoef
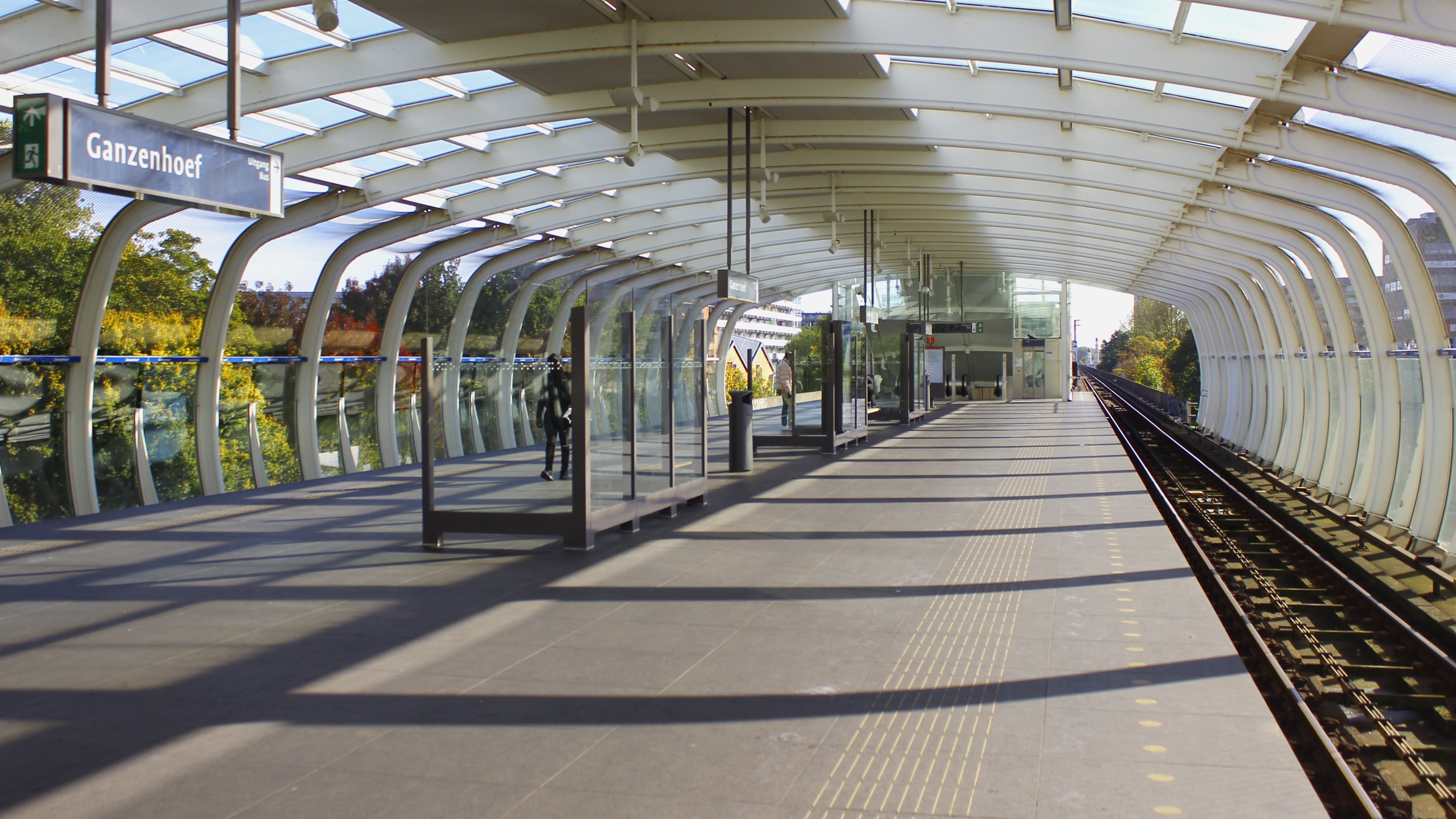

General information
- Location: Bijlmer-Oost
- Owner: GVB
- Line: 53
- Platforms: 2
- Tracks: 2

Construction
- Depth: elevated, 15 above ground viaduct.

Other information
- Fare zone: 5725

History
- Opened: 16 October 1977
- Rebuilt: 2009

Services
Preceding station	Amsterdam Metro	Following station
Verrijn Stuartweg towards Centraal Station	Line 53	Kraaiennest towards Gaasperplas
Location

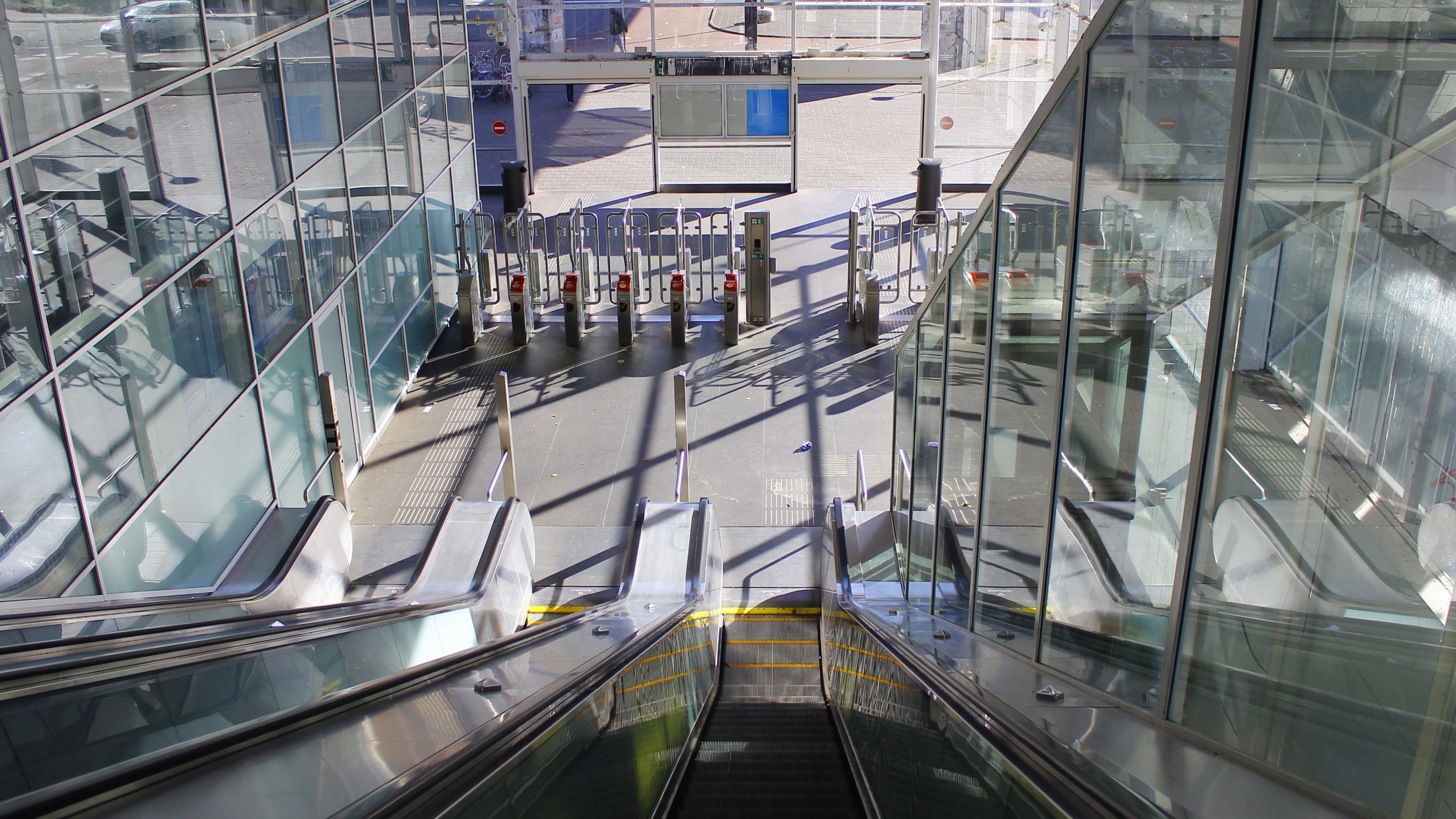
Station entrance

Ganzenhoef is an Amsterdam Metro station in Amsterdam, Netherlands.
