= Zeeger Gulden =

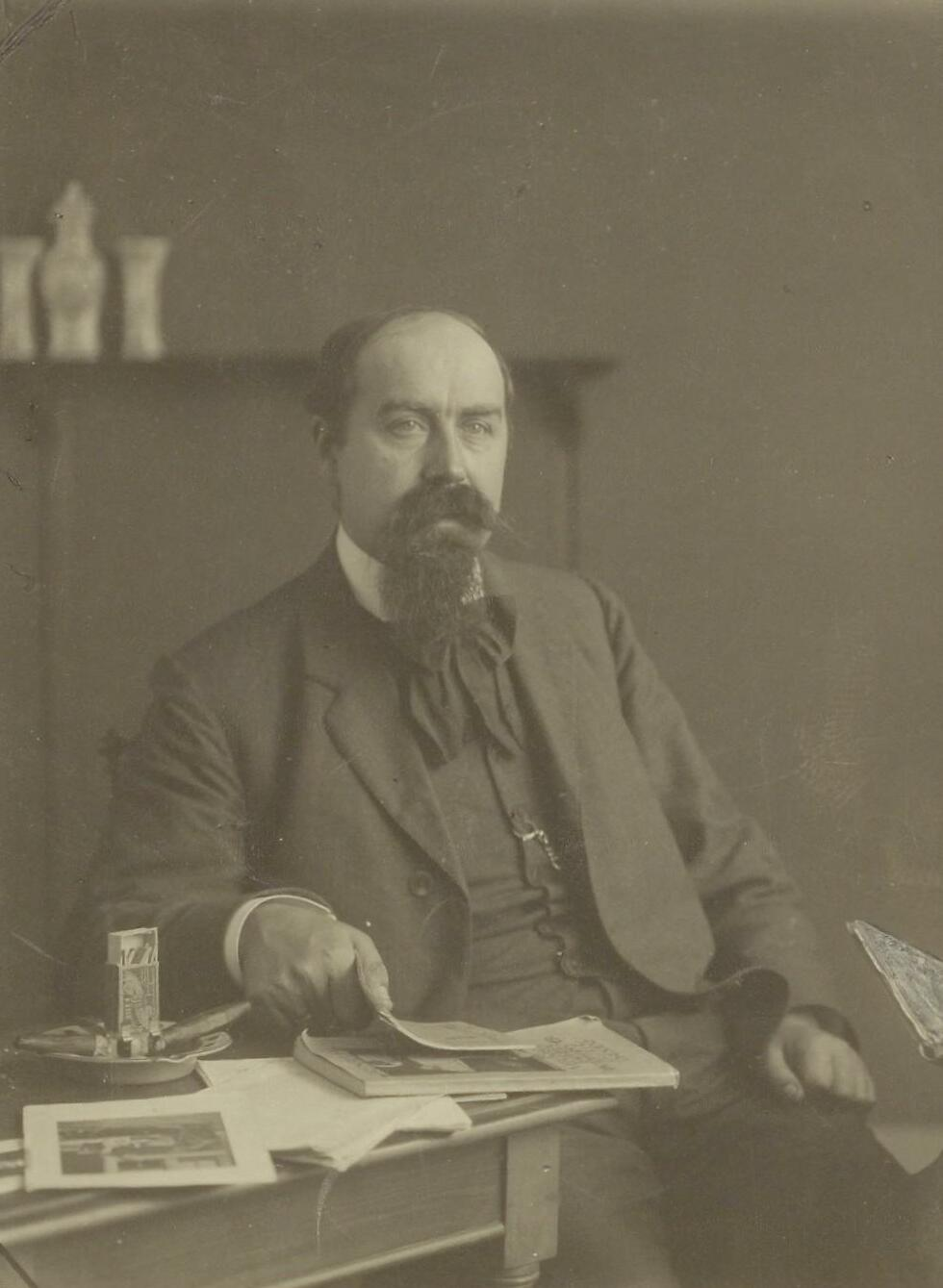
- Zeeger Daniël Johan Wilhelm Gulden in 1930
- Born: Zeeger Daniël Johan Wilhelm Gulden; 2 March 1875; Zaltbommel, Netherlands
- Died: 24 November 1960 (aged 85); Amsterdam, Netherlands
- Occupation: Architect
- Spouse: Johanna Sophia Petronella Dutrij van Haeften
- Children: Zeger Maria Antonie Gulden; Maria (Miek) Johanna Gulden
- Buildings: Rozentheater

Zeeger Daniël Johan Wilhelm Gulden (2 March 1875 – 24 November 1960) was a Dutch architect and member of the municipal council of Amsterdam for the Social Democratic Workers' Party.

== Biography ==
Zeeger Gulden was born in Zaltbommel to the local municipal architect Antonie Marinus Adolf Gulden. After graduating from the Hogere Burgerschool in Zaltbommel, Zeeger Gulden moved to Amsterdam in 1896, where he was employed as an illustrator at the municipal telephone company.

While he was employed at the municipal telephone company, Zeeger Gulden helped found the Amsterdam Union of Municipal Officials in 1907, and became editor of the union's magazine Het Prinsenhof. After he published an article in the magazine that was critical of the municipal government, Zeeger Gulden was fired from the municipal telephone company in 1908. This affair was widely reported on in the media and eventually led to the resignation of Amsterdam mayor Wilhelmus Frederik van Leeuwen.

Zeeger Gulden subsequently established himself as an architect, and founded the architect firm Gulden & Geldmaker together with his colleague Melle Geldmaker, which was responsible for many social housing projects in Amsterdam and in other towns in the Netherlands.

In 1909, Zeeger Gulden was elected to the municipal council of Amsterdam for the Social Democratic Workers' Party. In the 1920s, Zeeger Gulden together with Emanuel Boekman pleaded for the construction of an underground railway network in Amsterdam. Zeeger Gulden would serve for 30 years as a municipal councillor to eventually resign on 5 September 1939.

After the Second World War, Zeeger Gulden worked together with architect Izaäk Blomhert (1879-1956) and after Blomhert's death with Ger Husslage. Husslage continued the work of the architect firm after Gulden's death under his own name.

== Publications ==
- Rationalisatie in de woningbouw (H. Meulenhof, 1930).

== Selected works ==
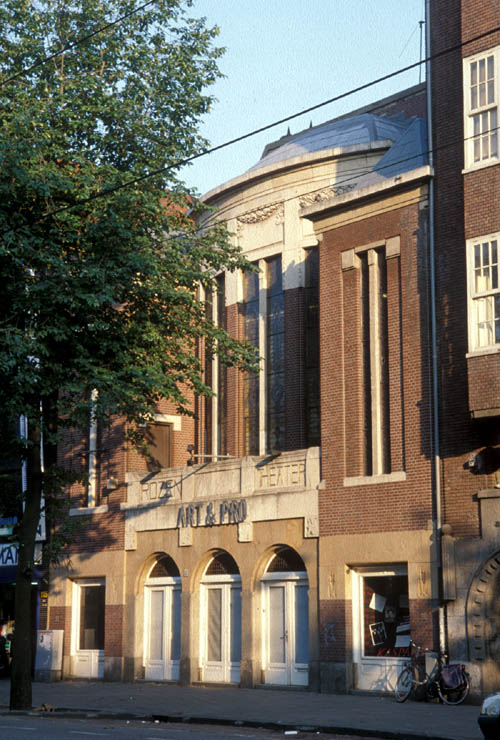
The Rozentheater in Amsterdam

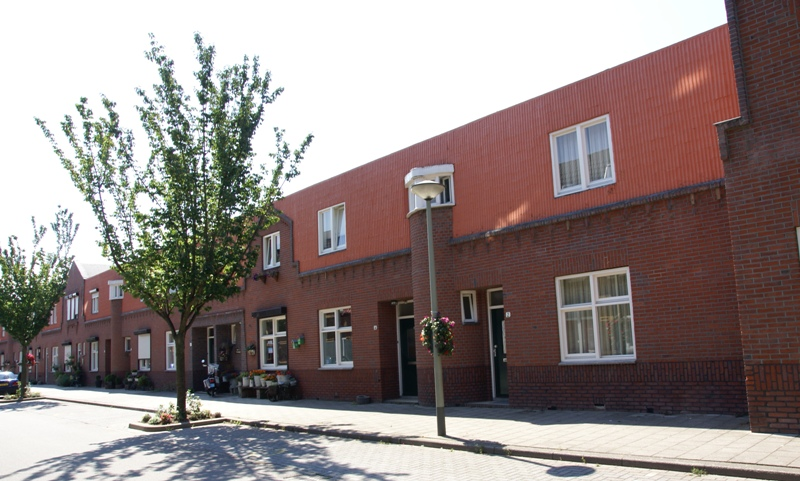
Workers' houses on the Van den Berghstraat in Maastricht

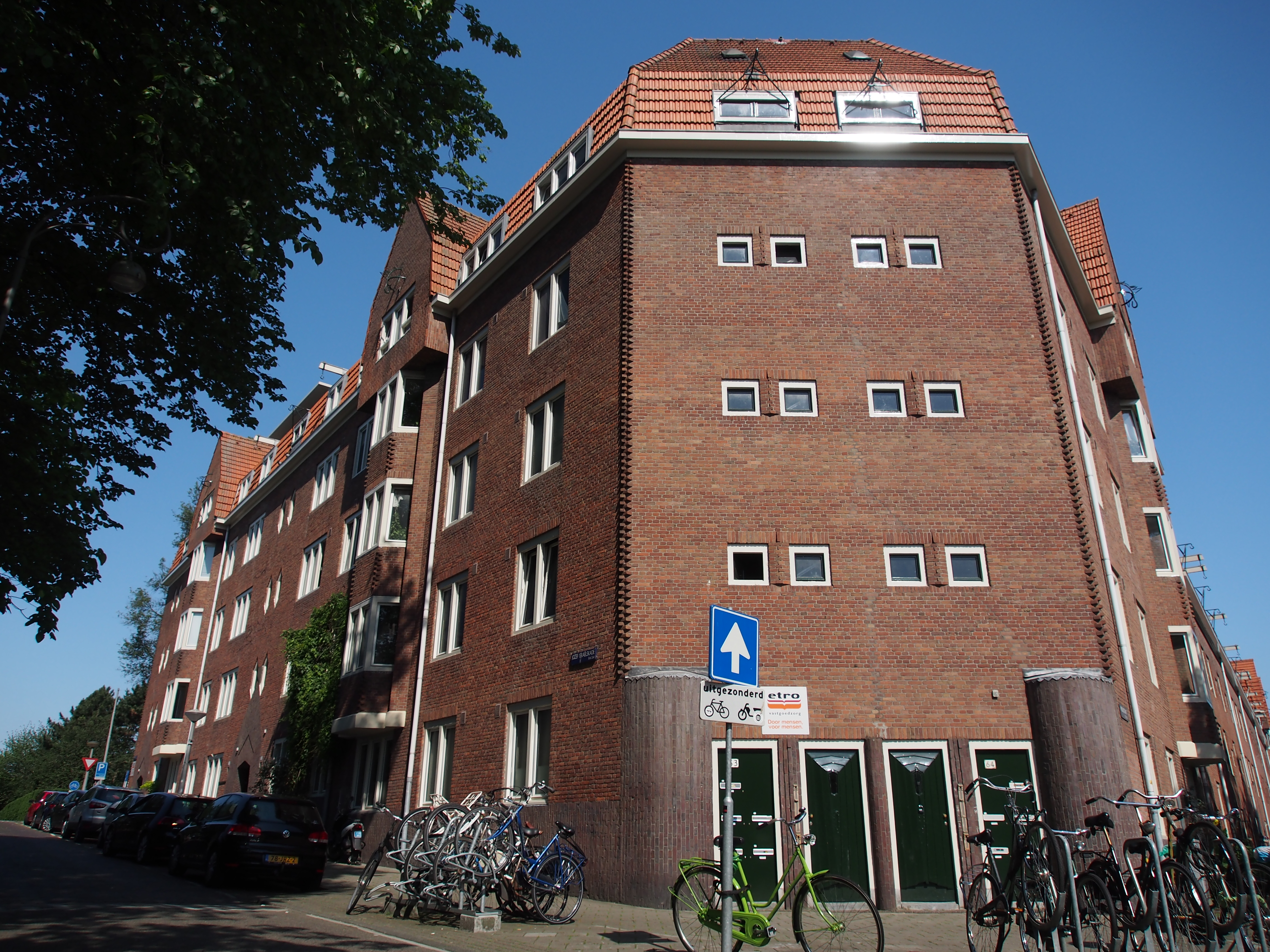
Workers' houses on the Jozef Israëlskade in Amsterdam

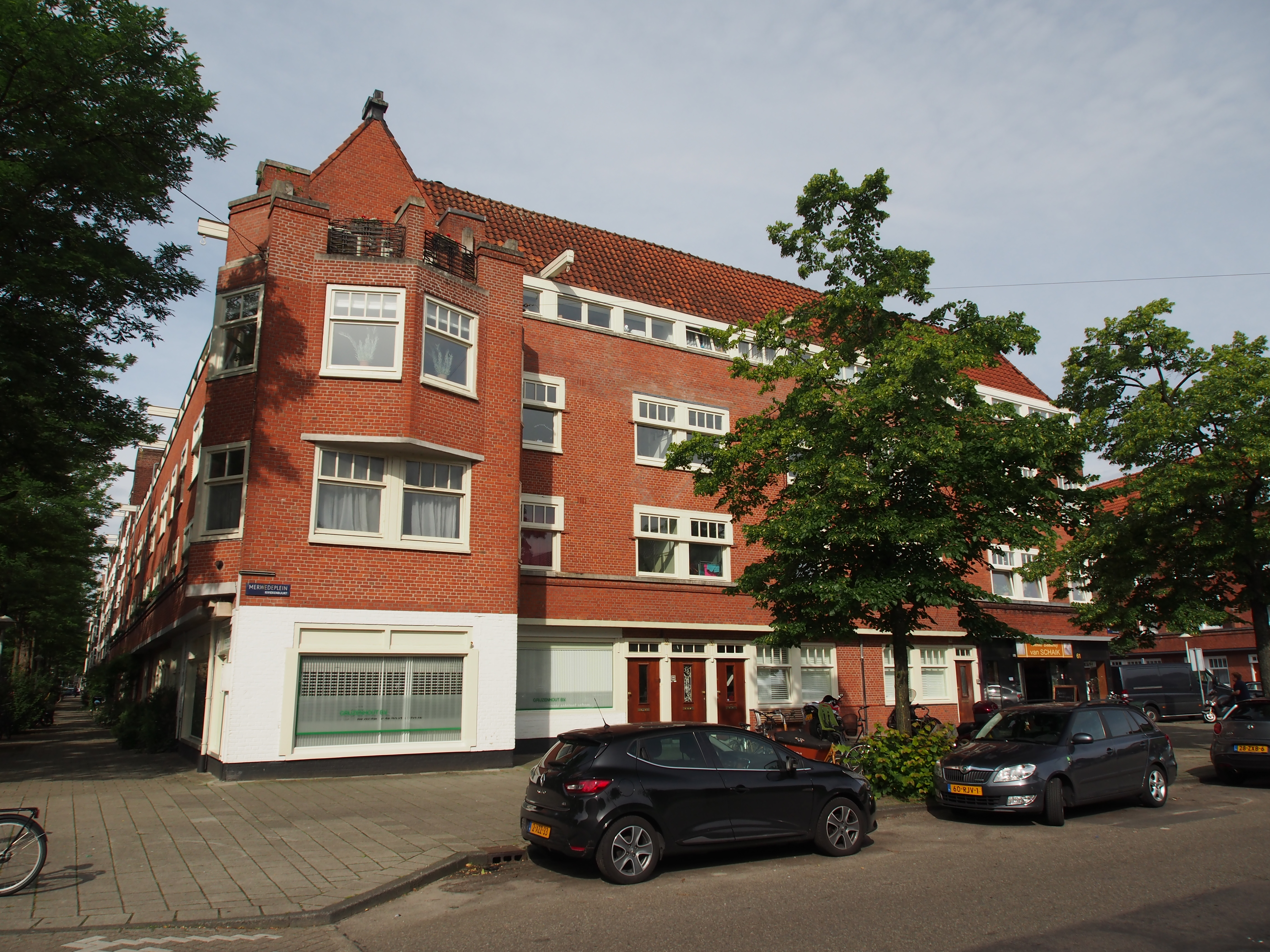
Workers' houses on the Merwedeplein in Amsterdam

== Personal life ==
Zeeger Gulden married Johanna Sophia Petronella Dutrij van Haeften on 22 December 1904. Together they had two children: Zeger Maria Antonie Gulden (born 1905) en Maria (Miek) Johanna Gulden (born 1908). His son Zeger was an active member of the Dutch resistance to the German occupation during the Second World War and was executed in 1943 or 1944.
