= Transport in Amsterdam =

Transportation within the city of Amsterdam is characterised by bicycles and public transportation. Large freeways only exist around the city, terminating at the A10 Ringroad. Navigating by car through the city centre is discouraged, with the government sponsoring initiatives to reduce car usage.

== Local ==
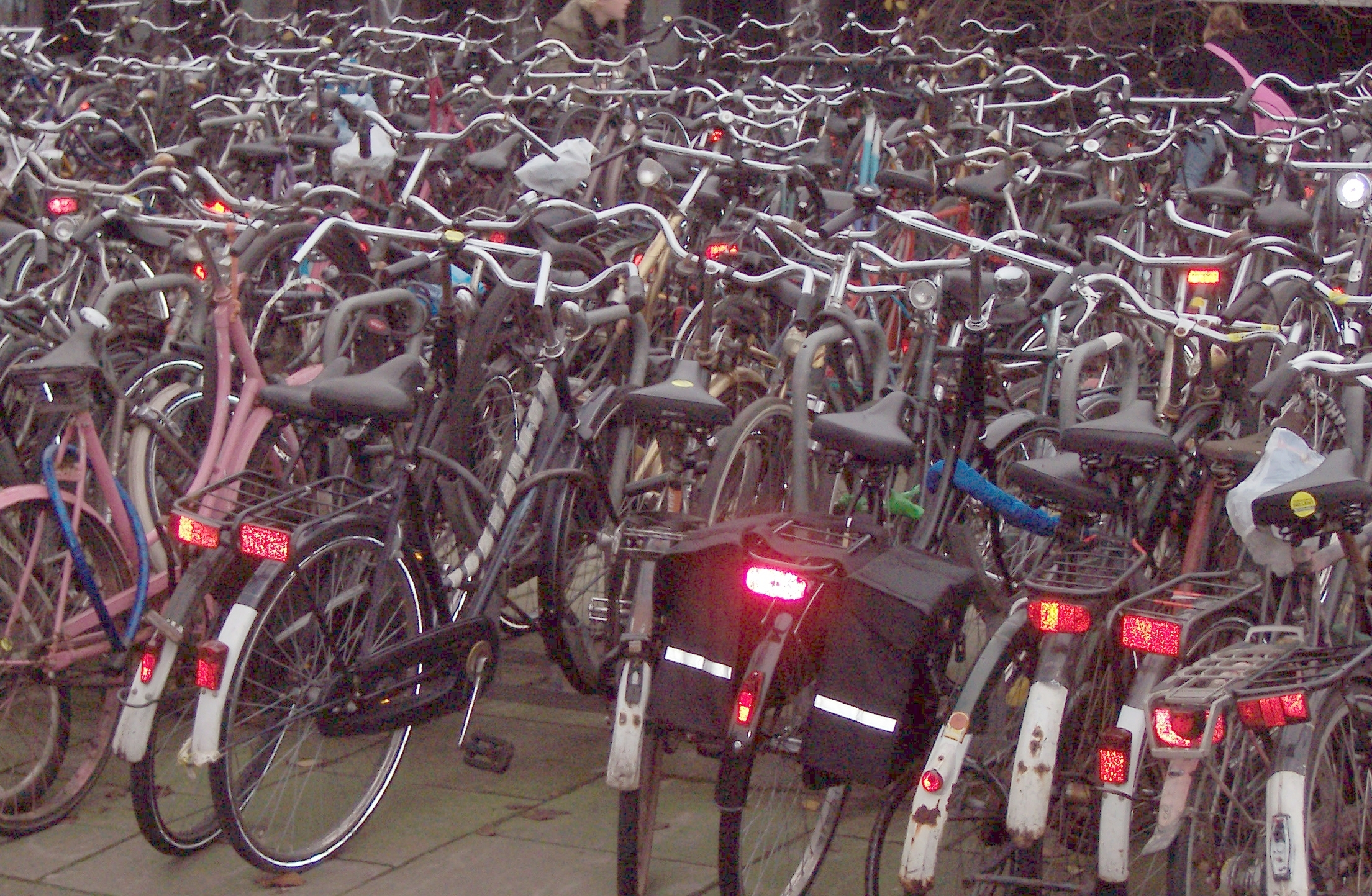
Many bikes parked in Amsterdam

Tram in central Amsterdam

=== Bicycle ===
Amsterdam is known as one of the most bicycle-friendly cities in the world and is a centre of bicycle culture. 38% of all journeys in the city are made by bicycle. Most main streets have bike paths. Bike racks are ubiquitous throughout the city. There are about 1,000,000 bicycles in the city. Each year, about 100,000 of them are stolen and 25,000 end up in the canals.

=== Boat ===
Amsterdam has a large collection of canals. In total over 150 of these waterways crisscross the city and its surroundings, dividing the city of Amsterdam into approximately 90 mini islands. This network of islands is joined by a vast number of bridges, totaling over 1,000. For many centuries, these canals or waterways were used as the main transportation routes in Amsterdam. Everything ranging from water to coal, from food to spices used to be transported over these canals. Today these canals are only suitable for smaller barges, pleasure craft and the canal tour boats. There is however one main exception: DHL has its own DHL parcel boats that deliver packages across town using the old waterways.

=== Public transport ===
Public transport in Amsterdam consists of metro, tram, bus and ferry routes operated mainly by GVB, the city-owned public transport operator. Regional buses, and some suburban buses, are operated by Connexxion and EBS. Currently, there are 16 different tram routes, and five metro routes. There are also privately operated water taxis, a water bus, a boat sharing operation, electric rental boats (Boaty) and canal cruises, that transport people along Amsterdam's waterways. The GVB Tickets & Info office (just outside Amsterdam Centraal) offers a free public transport map.

During the construction of the Amsterdam Metro, plans to demolish the entire former Jewish neighbourhood near the Nieuwmarkt led to strong protests. Wall decorations at the Nieuwmarkt metro station are a reminder to the protests, which have become known at the Nieuwmarkt Riots. The metro was built nevertheless, but plans to build a highway through the neighbourhood in the centre of Amsterdam were abolished. A new underground line, the North/South Line (Noord/Zuidlijn), has been constructed since 2002. The completion date was 22 July 2018.

=== Car ===
Transportation by car is discouraged by the local government, with initiatives such as Autodelen and Meerijden.nu being sponsored, and steep parking fees and a great number of streets are closed off for cars in the city centre. Most are accessible by cyclists. The s100 is called the centrumring, a smaller ringroad circumnavigating the city centre.

== Accessibility ==
In a 2015 case study research of the City region of Amsterdam by the transportation planner Karel Martens which measured accessibility levels of car users versus non car users to jobs and opportunities within a commuting distance; it was found that in non rush hour times, all car users enjoyed sufficient levels of accessibility while during rush hour periphereal parts of the region did not enjoy sufficient levels of accessibility. Non car users' level of accessibility to jobs and opportunities was found to be below the sufficiency level at all times including both rush hour times and outside rush hour times. However, levels of accessibility of non car users was similar in both times.

== National ==
=== Rail ===
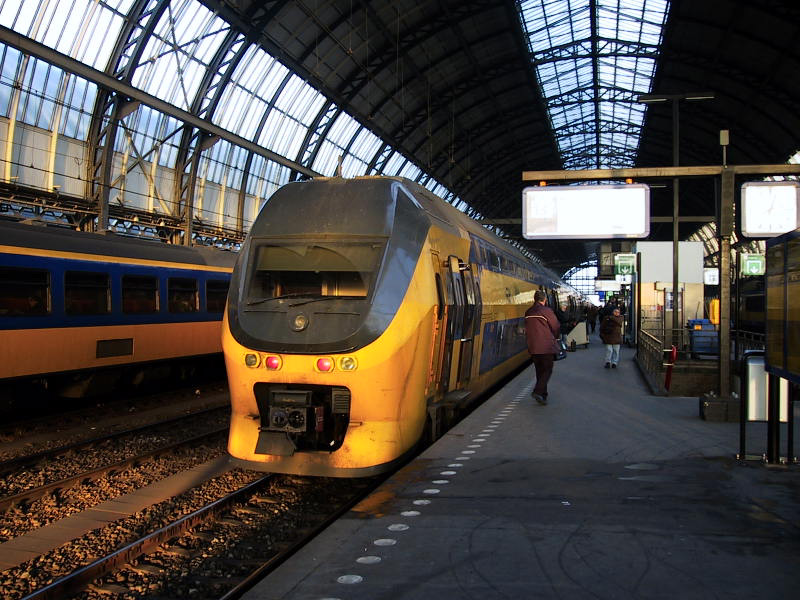
NS double-decker train at Amsterdam Central Station

There are 10 train stations in Amsterdam; most notably Amsterdam Centraal, Amsterdam Zuid, Amsterdam Bijlmer ArenA, Amsterdam Lelylaan and Amsterdam RAI are served by both rail and the metro.

=== Road ===
The A10 Ringroad surrounding the city connects Amsterdam with the Dutch national network of freeways. Interchanges allow cars to enter the city by transferring to one of the eighteen city roads, numbered s101 through s118. These city roads are regional roads without grade separation, and sometimes without a central reservation.

== International ==
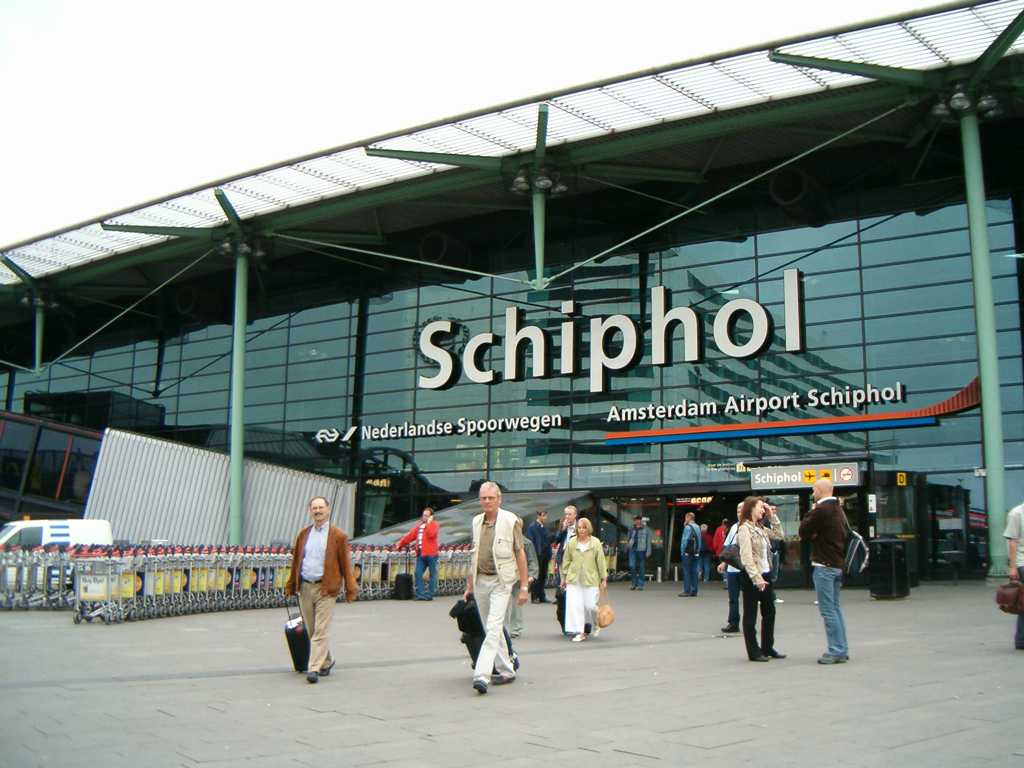
The international airport Schiphol

FlixBus has coaches from Amsterdam to destinations all over Europe, these depart from Amsterdam Sloterdijk railway station. IDBUS operates coaches from Amsterdam to Lille and Paris, also departing from Amsterdam Sloterdijk railway station.

Amsterdam Centraal is an international train station. From the station there are regular services with destinations in Belgium, France, the United Kingdom, Germany, Austria and Switzerland. Among these trains are international trains of the Nederlandse Spoorwegen and the Nightjet, Eurostar and Intercity-Express.

Amsterdam Schiphol Airport is less than 20 minutes by train from Amsterdam Central Station. It is the biggest airport in the Netherlands, the 3rd largest in Europe and the fourteenth largest in the world. It handles about 68 million passengers a year (2017) and is home base to KLM, since 2004 part of Air France-KLM.

DFDS Seaways is one of the main companies to operate in and out of IJmuiden.

== See also ==
- Economy of Amsterdam
- History of Amsterdam
- Tourism in Amsterdam
- Transport in the Netherlands
