= Kraaiennest metro station =

Metro station in Amsterdam

Coordinates: 52°18′59″N 4°58′46″E

Kraaiennest
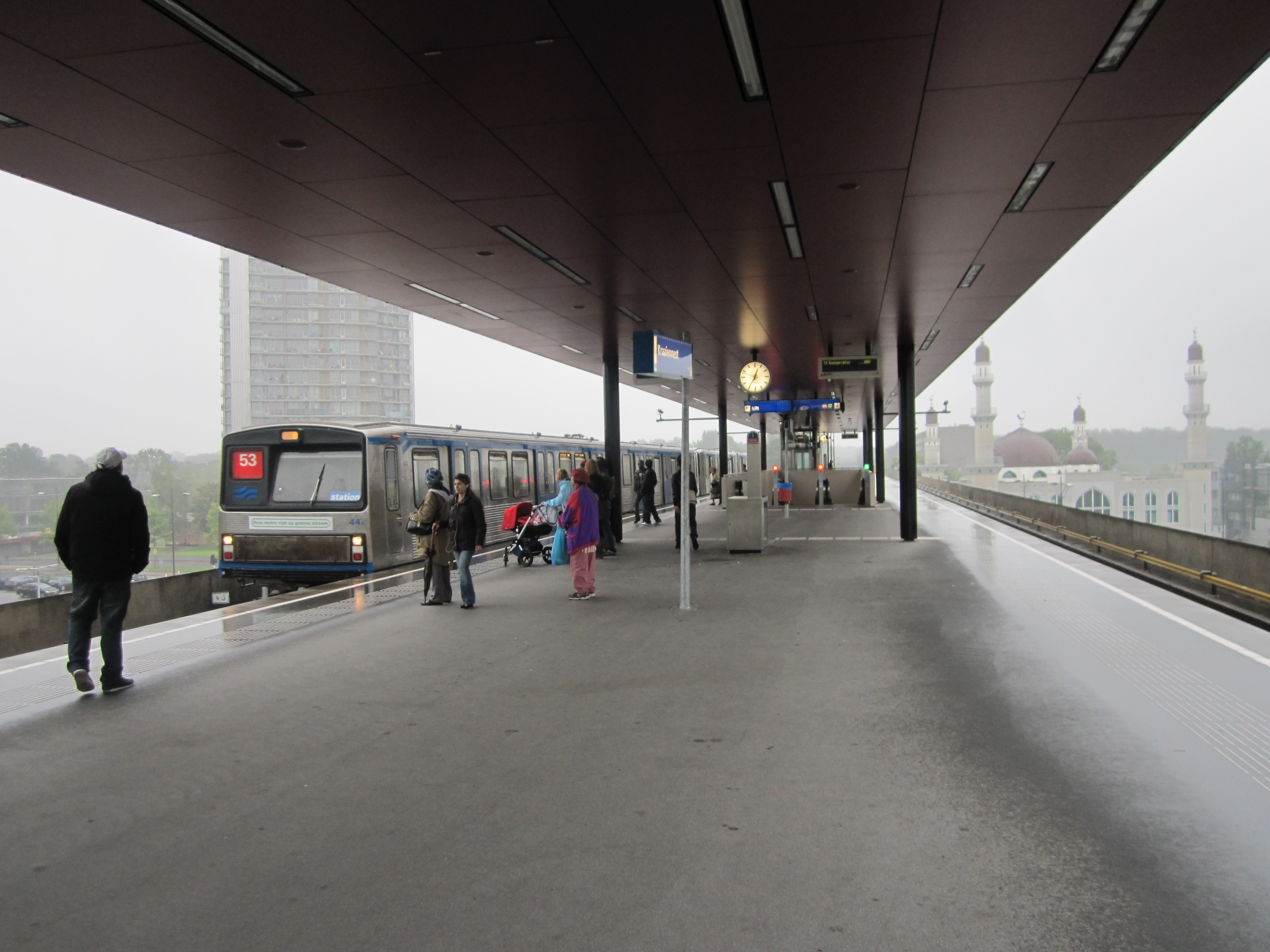

General information
- Location: Bijlmer-Oost
- Owner: GVB
- Line: 53
- Platforms: 2
- Tracks: 2

Construction
- Depth: elevated, 15 meters above ground viaduct

History
- Opened: 16 October 1977
- Rebuilt: 2013

Services
Preceding station	Amsterdam Metro	Following station
Ganzenhoef towards Centraal Station	Line 53	Gaasperplas Terminus
Location

Kraaiennest is an Amsterdam Metro station in Amsterdam, Netherlands.

The station was renovated and reopened in September 2013, to a design by Dutch-British Architecture Firm Maccreanor Lavington. The renovations resulted in a Royal Institute of British Architects award in 2014.
