= Amsterdam Metro =

Rapid transit railway in the Netherlands

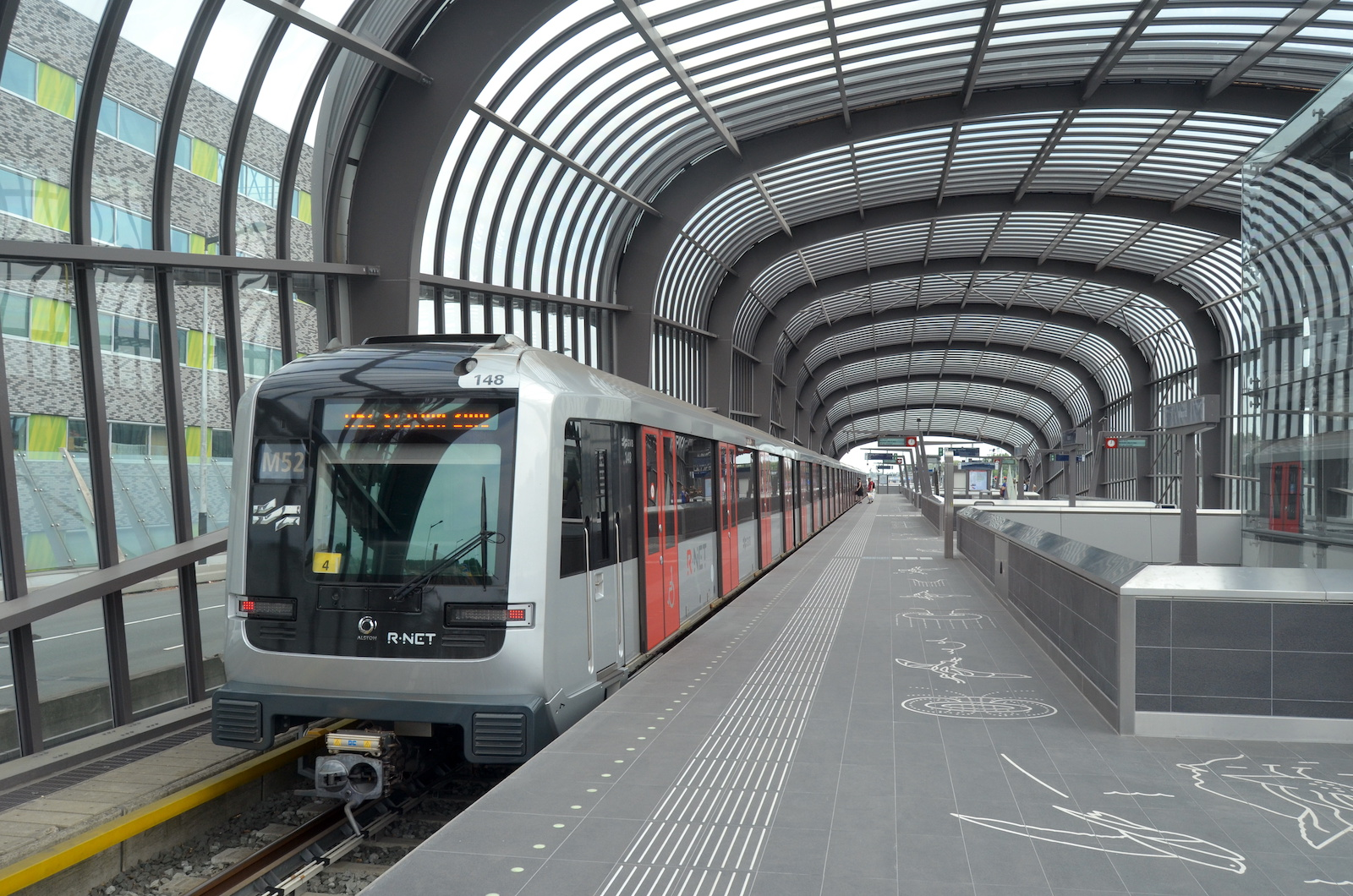
- An M5 train at Noord Station

Overview
- Native name: Amsterdamse metro
- Owner: City of Amsterdam
- Locale: Amsterdam, Diemen, Ouder-Amstel
- Transit type: Rapid transit
- Number of lines: 5
- Number of stations: 39
- Daily ridership: 247,397 (2018)
- Annual ridership: 110.9 million (2025)
- Website: gvb.nl/en

Operation
- Began operation: 14 October 1977; 49 years ago
- Operator: Gemeente Vervoerbedrijf
- Number of vehicles: 90

Technical
- System length: 42.7 km (26.5 mi)
- Track gauge: 1,435 mm (4 ft 8 1/2 in) standard gauge
- Electrification: Third rail, 750 V DC
- Top speed: 70 km/h (43 mph)
System map

The Amsterdam Metro (Dutch: Amsterdamse Metro) is a rapid transit system serving Amsterdam, Netherlands, and extending into the surrounding municipalities of Diemen and Ouder-Amstel. The network is owned by the City of Amsterdam and operated by GVB, the municipal public transport company that also operates the city’s trams, buses, and ferries. The metro forms one part of Amsterdam’s rail-based public transport network alongside the extensive tram system and frequent regional and intercity trains operated by Nederlandse Spoorwegen (NS).

The metro is a relatively recent addition to Amsterdam’s transportation system, with service beginning in October 1977. The first line, the Oostlijn (East Line), connected the city centre to the newly developed Bijlmermeer area in the southeastern borough of Amsterdam-Zuidoost via Lines 53 and 54. Further expansion was delayed due to public opposition, resuming in the 1990s with the opening of Line 51, a hybrid metro/tram route developed as a compromise with the municipality of Amstelveen.

The system now comprises five lines and 39 stations, spanning 42.7 kilometres (26.5 mi). Three lines—51, 53, and 54—originate at Centraal Station, with Lines 53 and 54 running southeast to Zuidoost, and Line 51 heading south before turning west. Until 2019, Line 51 continued as a tram into Amstelveen, but this segment was closed and replaced with a dedicated tram line, the Amsteltram. Line 50, the only route that bypasses the city centre, connects Zuidoost to western districts. The newest addition, Line 52, opened in July 2018 and runs from Amsterdam-Noord to Amsterdam-Zuid via Centraal. It was constructed mostly underground and does not share tracks with other lines.

== History ==
=== Planning history ===
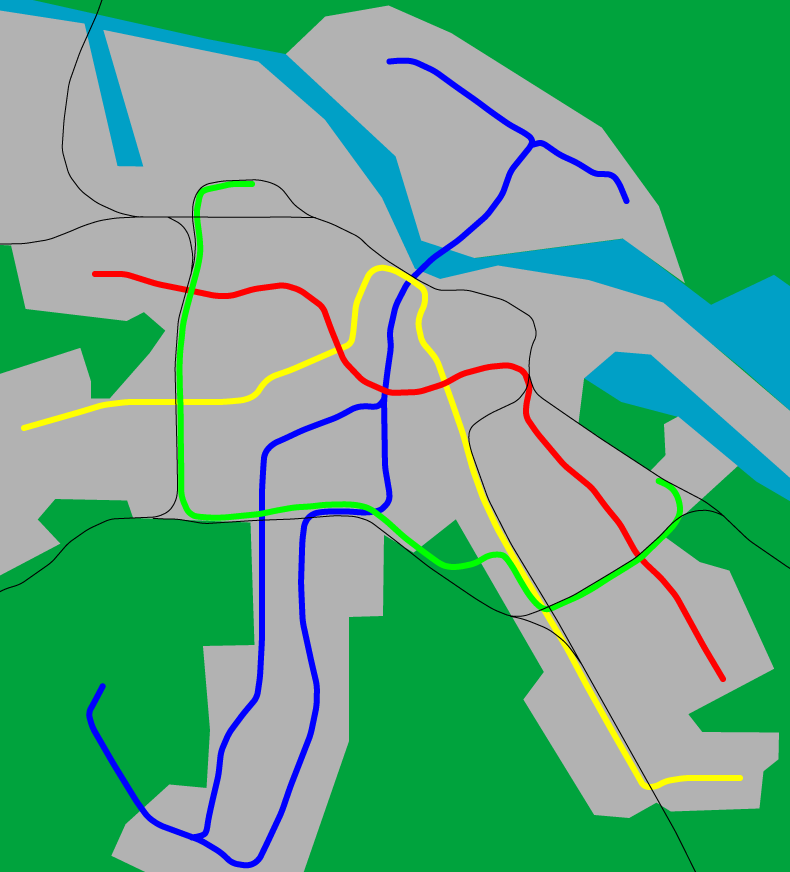
The 1968 plan for the metro

The first plans for an underground railway in Amsterdam date from the 1920s: in November 1922, members of the municipal council of Amsterdam Zeeger Gulden and Emanuel Boekman asked the responsible alderman Ter Haar to study the possibility of constructing an underground railway in the city, in response to which the municipal department of Public Works drafted reports with proposals for underground railways in both 1923 and 1929. These plans stalled in the planning phase, however, and it took until the 1950s for the discussion about underground rail to resurface again in Amsterdam.

The post-war population boom and increase in motorized traffic shifted the perception of underground rail transport in Amsterdam considerably: whereas in the 1920s, underground rail had been considered too expensive, halfway through the 1950s it was presented as a realistic solution to the problems caused by increased traffic. In 1955, a report published by the municipal government concerning the inner city of Amsterdam—known by the Dutch title Nota Binnenstad—suggested installing a commission to explore solutions to the traffic problems Amsterdam faced. This commission, which was headed by former director of the department of Public Works J.W. Clerx, was subsequently installed in March 1956, and published its report Openbaar vervoer in de agglomeratie Amsterdam in 1960.

The aldermen and mayor of Amsterdam agreed with the conclusion of the report of the Clerx commission that an underground railway network ought to be built in Amsterdam in the near future. In April 1963 they installed the Bureau Stadsspoorweg which had the task to study the technical feasibility of a metropolitan railway, to propose a route network, to suggest the preferred order of construction of the various lines, and to study the adverse effects of constructing a metro line, such as traffic disruption and the demolition of buildings.

In 1964 and 1965, Bureau Stadsspoorweg presented four reports to the municipal government of Amsterdam, which were made available to the public on 30 August 1966. In March 1968, the aldermen and mayor of Amsterdam subsequently submitted a proposal to the municipal council of Amsterdam to agree to the construction of the metro network, which the council assented to on 16 May 1968 with 38 votes in favour and 3 against. Under the original plan, four lines were to be built, connecting the entire city and replacing many of the existing tram lines. The following lines were planned: an east–west line from the southeast to the Osdorp district via Amsterdam Centraal railway station; a circle line from the western harbor area to the suburban town of Diemen; a north–south line from the northern district via Amsterdam Centraal to Weteringplantsoen traffic circle, with two branches at both ends; and a second east–west line from Geuzenveld district to Gaasperplas. The system would be constructed gradually and was expected to be completed by the end of the 1990s.

=== Design and construction ===
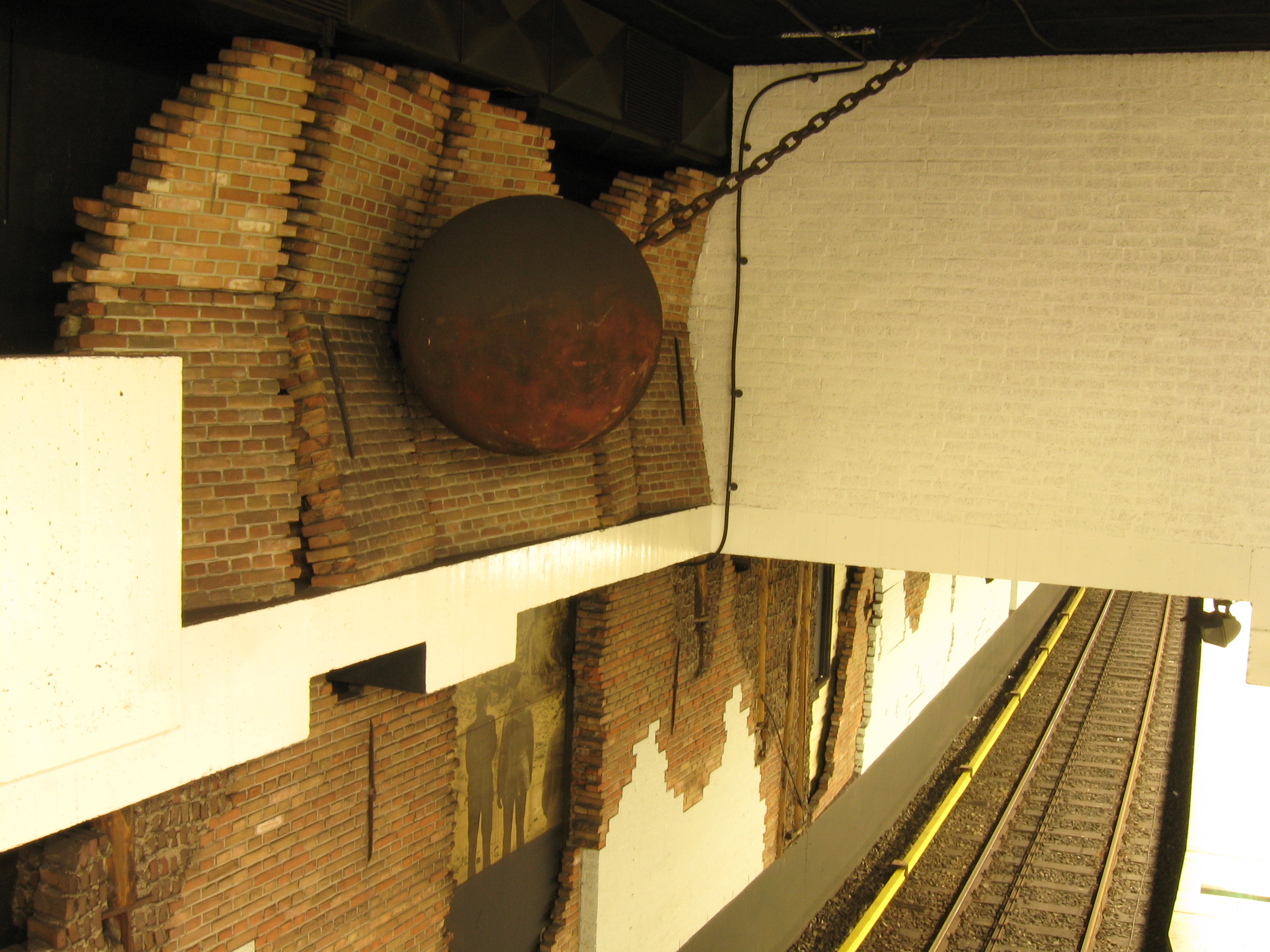
Wall decorations remembering the demolition in the Nieuwmarkt neighbourhood and protests against it

Construction of the Oostlijn (East Line) began in 1970 as the first phase of Amsterdam’s metro system, intended to connect the city centre with the newly developed residential district of Bijlmermeer in the southeast. The line opened on 14 October 1977, running underground from Weesperplein through the eastern districts to Amsterdam Amstel station, then continuing above ground alongside existing NS railway tracks. At Van der Madeweg, it splits into two branches: Route 53 follows a new right-of-way to Gaasperplas, while Route 54 continued along NS tracks to Holendrecht. Both routes were extended to Amsterdam Centraal on 11 October 1980, and Route 54 was further extended on a new right-of-way from Holendrecht to Gein on 27 August 1982.

The stations were designed by city architect Ben Spängberg, later joined by Sier van Rhijn. Their approach emphasized smooth, rounded architecture, though budget constraints initially limited features like elevators. Only two elevator shafts were permitted, with one activated. Station design continued during tunnel construction, requiring frequent site visits and adjustments.

Because of Amsterdam's geography, tunneling was difficult and most sections were constructed using 40-metre-long (130 ft) caissons, built on site and lowered into place by blasting away the soil beneath. Controversially, this method required the demolition of buildings above the tunnel. An exception was the Wibautstraat area, where the cut-and-cover method was used.

The planned demolition of parts of the Nieuwmarkt neighbourhood for tunnel construction sparked fierce opposition and the Nieuwmarkt riots in 1975. While the East Line was completed, plans for a second metro tunnel and a highway through the area were abandoned. One level of the planned interchange between the two metro lines remains unused beneath Weesperplein and is still visible via elevator controls. Built during the Cold War, Weesperplein also contains a never-used bomb shelter.

=== Later lines ===
Route network of the Amsterdam Metro with years of opening

In 1990, the Amstelveen Line (Dutch: Amstelveenlijn) opened for service as Route 51. As a political compromise between the city of Amsterdam and the municipality of Amstelveen, the line was constructed as a hybrid system: the northern section operated as a metro line using third rail power, while the southern section functioned over an existing a tram line using overhead wires. As a result, Route 51 was designated an sneltram (lit. 'express tram'), and its vehicles were built to light rail specifications. The transition between power systems occurred at Zuid station.

In 1997, the Ring Line (Dutch: Ringlijn) was added to the network, operating as Route 50. It provides a direct rapid transit connection between the southern and western parts of the city without passing through the city centre.

The most recent addition to the system is the North–South Line (Dutch: Noord/Zuidlijn), which opened on 21 July 2018. Designated as Route 52, it connects Amsterdam-Noord and Amsterdam-Zuid via Centraal Station, primarily through deep-bored tunnels beneath the IJ and the city centre.

In March 2019, sneltram operations ceased. The southern portion of the route was replaced by the Amsteltram, a more conventional tram service that retains some express characteristics, terminating at Zuid station. This conversion involved a €300 million reconstruction of the corridor. Passengers now transfer at Zuid station to continue on the metro network. The Line 51 designation was retained for a new circular route between Isolatorweg and Centraal Station

== Network ==
From 1997 to 2018 the Amsterdam metro system consisted of four metro routes. The oldest routes are Route 54 (from Centraal station to Gein) and Route 53 (from Centraal station to Gaasperplas). Both routes are using the Oostlijn (East Line) infrastructure, which was completed in 1977. Route 51 (from Centraal station to Amstelveen Westwijk), using part of the East Line as well as the Amstelveenlijn (Amstelveen Line), was added in 1990. Route 50 (from Isolatorweg to Gein) using the Ringlijn (Ring Line or Circle Line), which was completed in 1997, as well as part of the East Line infrastructure.

A fifth line, Route 52 (from Noord station to Zuid station), was added to the network operating the Noord-Zuidlijn (North–South Line), which was completed and opened on 21 July 2018.

There are 33 full metro stations, Since Route 52 on the new North-South Line opened, six additional stations and 9.5 kilometres (5.9 mi) of route have been added to the metro system, yielding a new combined network length of 52 kilometres (32 mi). In 2019, sneltram Route 51 no longer operates into the metro network. The southern sneltram portion was closed for conversion to be incorporated into the tram network.

Route	Symbol	Line(s) used	Termini	Opening	Length km (mi)	Stations	Ridership (2019 daily avg.)
50		Ring, East (South branch)	Isolatorweg – Gein	1997	20.1 (12.5)	20	100,200
51		Ring, East	Isolatorweg – Centraal	1990	19.5 (12.1)	19	60,800
52		North–South	Noord – Zuid	2018	9.5 (5.9)	8	84,000
53		East (East branch)	Gaasperplas – Centraal	1977	11.3 (7.0)	14	60,600
54		East (South branch)	Gein – Centraal	1977	12.1 (7.5)	15	73,500

=== East Line (Routes 53 and 54) ===
==== Route ====
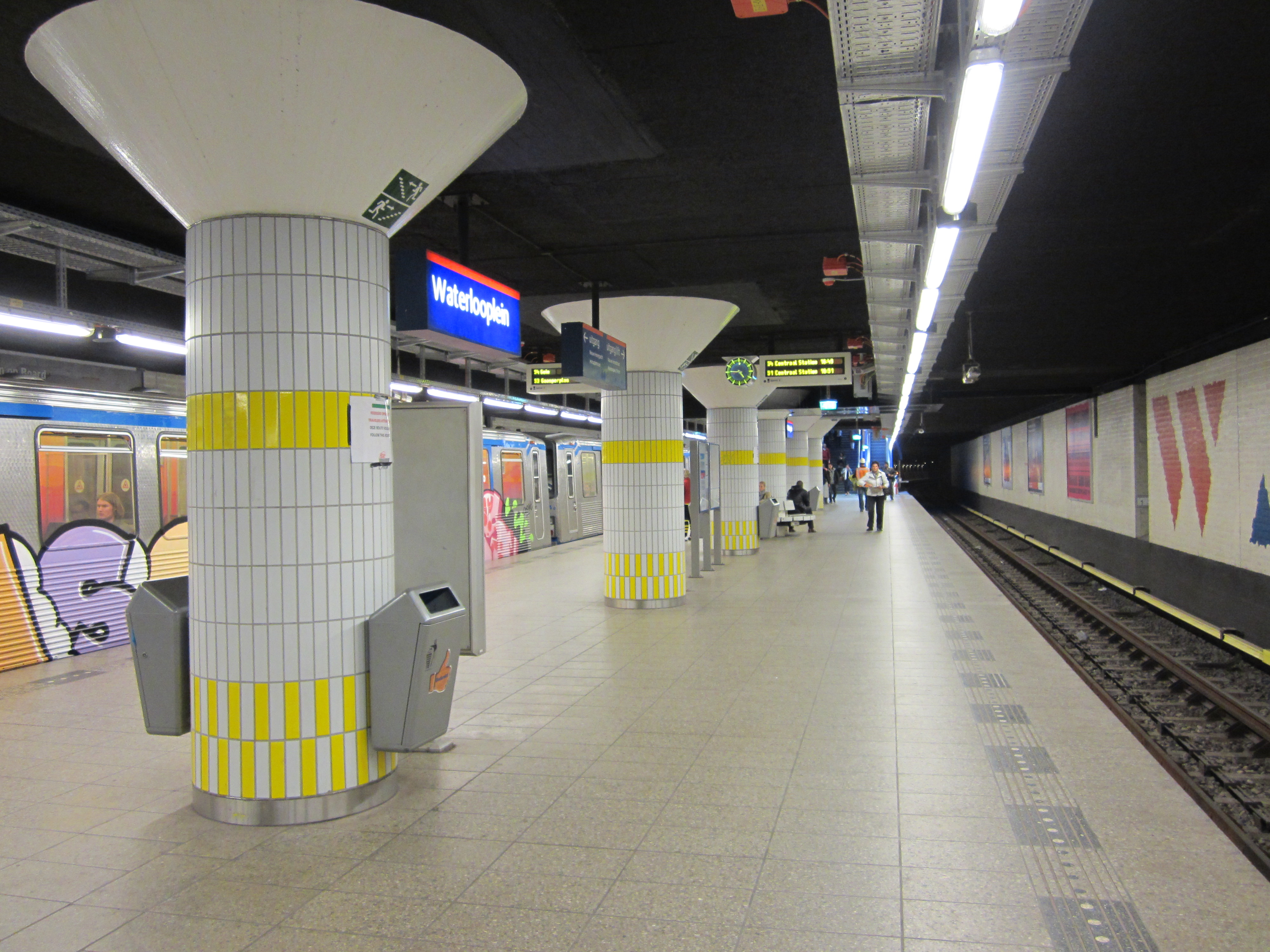
Waterlooplein station, opened in 1980, seen before its 2010s renovation.

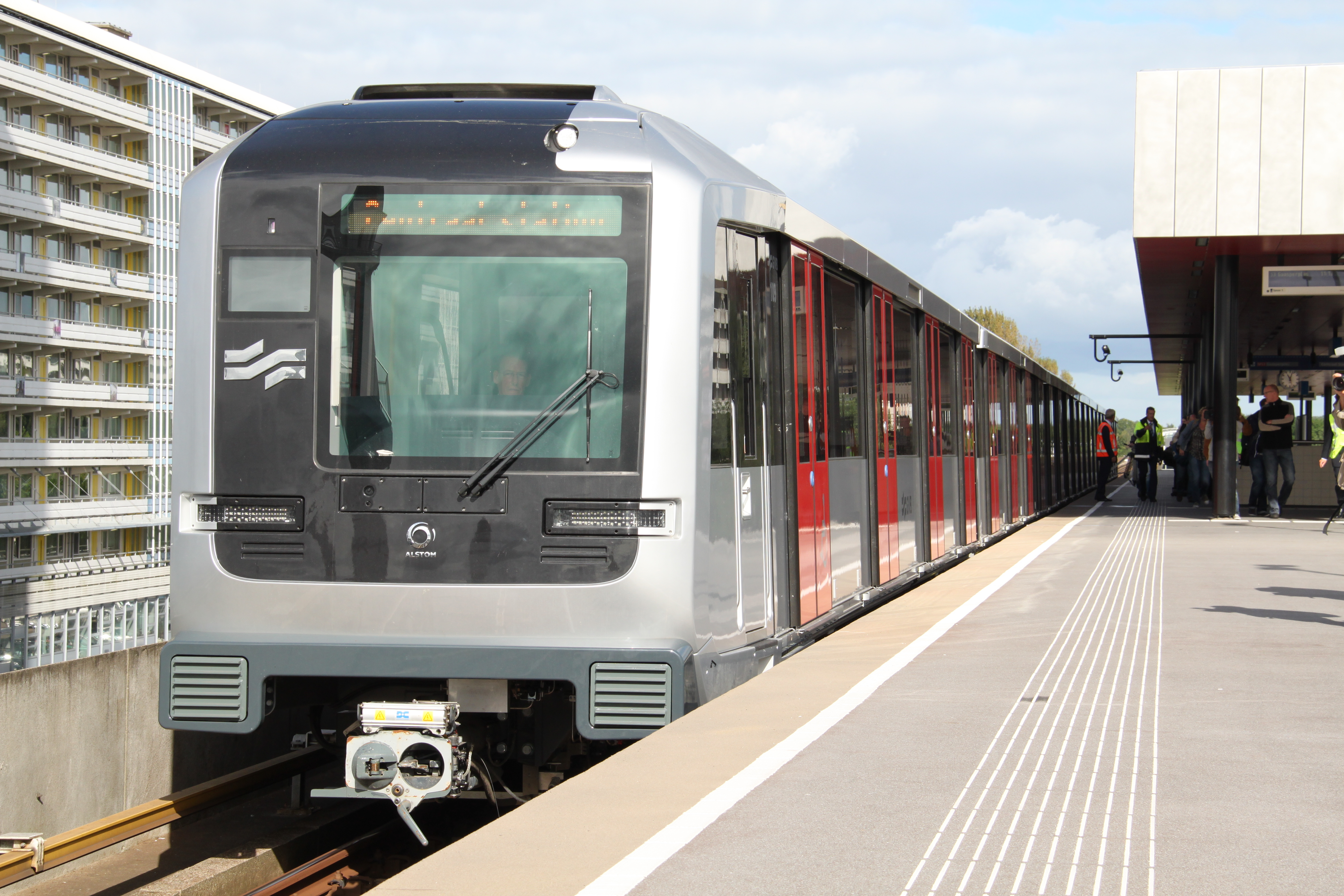
An M5 metro at Kraaiennest station

On 14 October 1977, the first metro train ran on the Oostlijn (East Line) from Weesperplein to Amsterdam-Zuidoost, with two branches respectively going to Gaasperplas (now Route 53) and Holendrecht (now Route 54). Spaklerweg station was completed as a shell, but opened later. On 11 October 1980, both routes were extended to Amsterdam Centraal Station, which is now their northern terminus. The Gein Branch was extended in the southern direction on 27 August 1982, when the section between Holendrecht and Gein was completed. Spaklerweg station was then opened. In some plans for the Gein Branch, an extension to Weesp and Almere was being considered. According to the most recent regional planning study, that now seems unlikely.

==== Architecture ====
A notable part of the East Line infrastructure is a dual metro overpass on the Gaasperplas Branch in the Bijlmermeer district between Ganzenhoef and Kraaiennest stations. This 1,100-metre (3,608 ft 11 in) long colonnade contains two single crossovers, each consisting of 33 pillars carrying 33-metre (108 ft 3 in) long beams. The center-to-center distance between the two overpasses is 15 metres (49 ft 3 in). This exceptional height was necessary because the metro had to bridge the main thoroughfares in the Bijlmermeer district which were built on a system of raised embankments and viaducts.

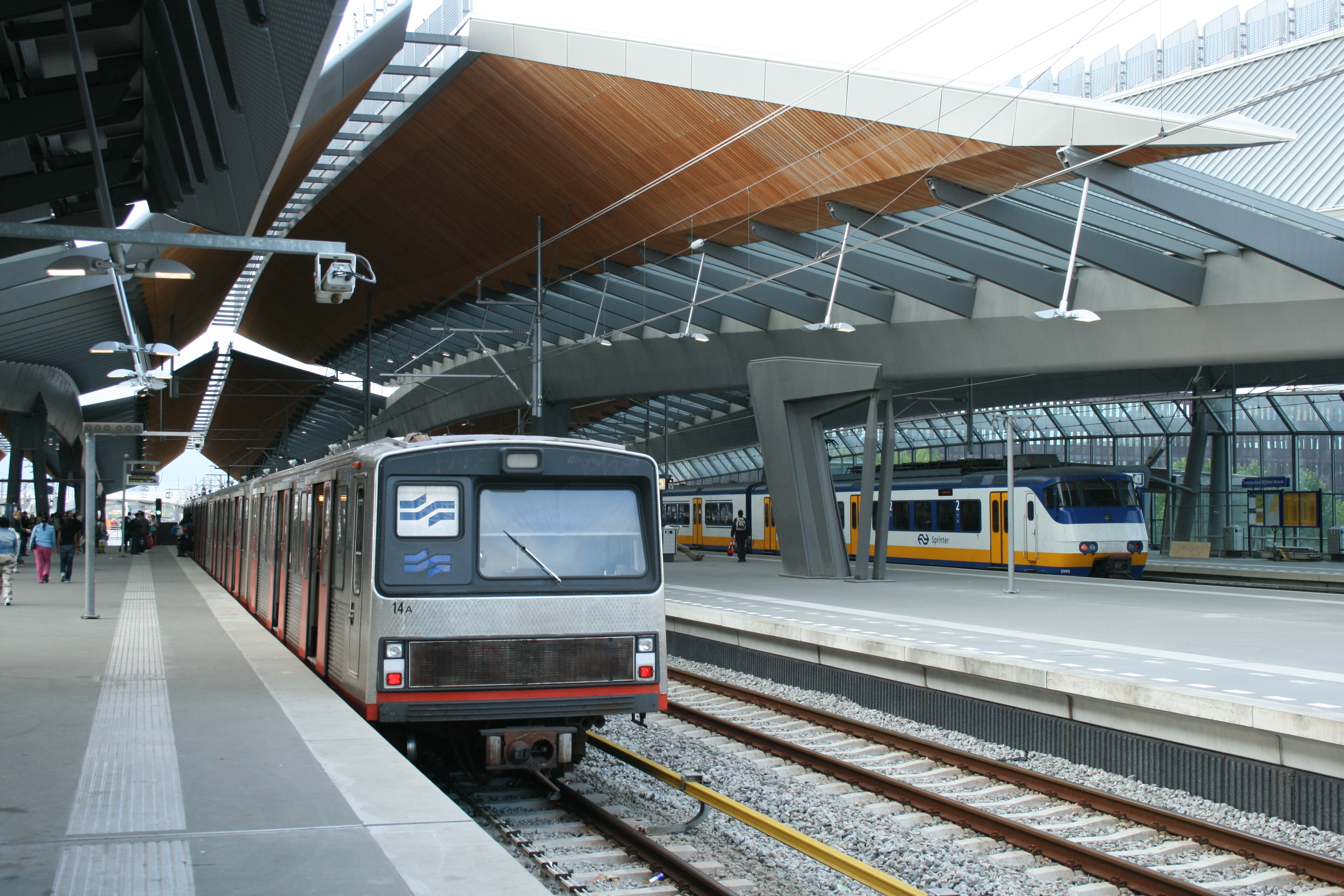
New Bijlmer Arena station (2007)

The stations, the infrastructure and the Diemen-Zuid maintenance facility of the East Line were designed by Ben Spängberg and Sier van Rhijn, two architects at the former Public Works Department of the City of Amsterdam. Their designs in Brutalist style are characterized by large-scale application of bare concrete and excessive space in the underground station halls. It also included a sophisticated use of colour. For example, the red colour of the train doors in the original design was also used at major facilities such as billboards, gates, elevator doors, bins, and the platform signage. For the design of the entire East Line Spängberg and Van Rhijn received Merkelbach Award in 1979. The East Line was also awarded the Betonprijs (Concrete Award) in 1981, which is commemorated by the award plaques in the concourses of Centraal station and Gein station.

As part of the city's policy that one percent of construction budgets for public works had to be spent on art, all stations on the Oostlijn have been decorated by different artists. In addition, the western wall of the tunnel was painted with lines and patterns which altered between the two stations, providing passengers with a fascinating view during the ride. Over the years, these decorations have completely been covered with graffiti. Some of the station artworks have also disappeared. Plans to remove all artworks as part of the large-scale renovation of the East Line tunnel in 2012 were altered after citizens' protests stating their historical significance.

==== Renovation ====
Over the years, several stations along the East Line were expanded or renovated. Since 2003, the metro station at Amsterdam Centraal station has been continuously under construction in order to accommodate the new North–South Line station. As part of commercial development of the area surrounding the Amsterdam Arena football stadium, which included a new major business and shopping district, the Bijlmer Arena station was substantially enlarged in order to handle the increasing number of passengers. The new station, designed by Grimshaw and Arcadis Articon Architects, opened in 2007 and was shortlisted for the Stirling Prize of the Royal Institute of British Architects. Another East Line station, Kraaiennest on Route 53, was reconstructed and upgraded in 2013 as part of the major urban renewal efforts in the Bijlmermeer district. The station designed by Maccreanor Lavington features a stainless steel facade with a floral design, which, according to the architects, "allows the station to be a lantern for the local neighbourhood, creating a sense of warmth on street level and creating an instantly recognisable feature for the station" at night time. The design was awarded the 2014 EU Stirling Prize.

A major overhaul of sixteen East Line stations was announced in June 2014. The renovation works taking place from 2015 until 2017 should bring more light and space to the stations. By removing paint layers on the walls, the original Brutalist architecture will become more pronounced. In addition, disused ticket offices are to be removed and lighting and signage will be improved.

=== Amstelveen Line (former route 51) ===
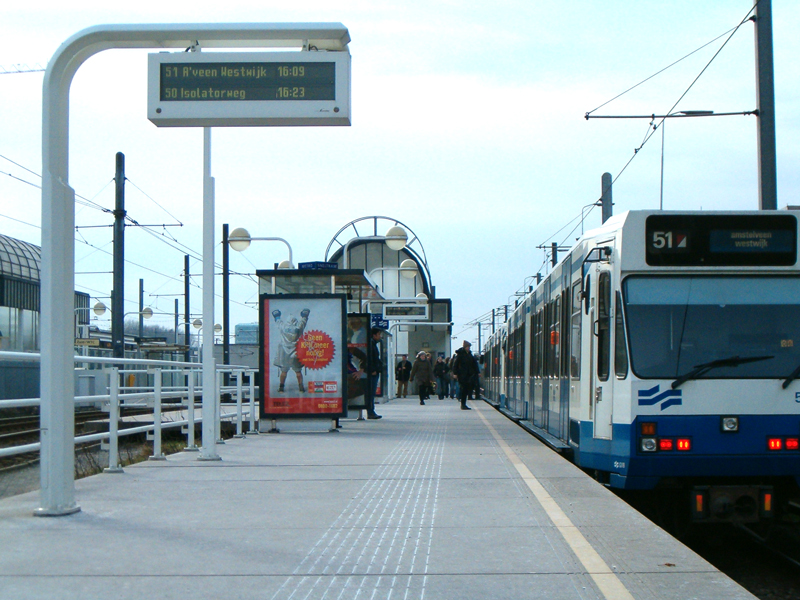
Route 51 vehicle at Zuid station, where it changed from third rail to overhead wire power supply.

==== History ====
Following the Nieuwmarkt Riots in 1975, the next major expansion of the metro network into the bordering city of Amstelveen was politically sensitive. When the decision was made to begin construction of the Amstelveenlijn (Amstelveen Line) in 1984, it was originally considered an express tram service rather than a fully-fledged metro route. On 1 December 1990 the section running from Spaklerweg to Poortwachter Station in Amstelveen was completed. As the sensitivity surrounding the metro expansion waned in the 1990s, the route was increasingly being referred to as a metro service. On 13 September 2004 an extension to Amstelveen Westwijk was completed.

Originally, the entire route of the Amstelveen Line from Spaklerweg, where it connects with the East Line, to Amstelveen was to be powered via overhead wiring. Eventually, it was decided to use a third rail between Spaklerweg and Zuid station in order to be able to increase metro service on this section of the line during exhibitions at the RAI convention centre, and overhead wiring on the southern section into Amstelveen.

The line was officially opened on 30 November 1990, replacing the overcrowded bus route 67. The equipment, lightrail series S1 and S2, was built between 1990 and 1994 by Belgian manufacturer BN in Bruges. From 1994, a total of 25 light rail vehicles was in operation. Since the extension to Westwijk in 2004, a number of S3 series trains are sometimes used on this route, raising the total number of vehicles available to 29.

Shortly before the opening, two lightrail vehicles had collided during trial runs, which reduced the number of vehicles available for the route to 11. Because of the lack of equipment and startup problems, the route was initially operated with limited service. In February 1991 heavy snowfall, continuing technical problems and equipment shortages led to the decision to limit the route to the route between Centraal Station and Zuid Station for nearly seven months, with replacement bus services on the remaining route into Amstelveen.

In 2018, after the completion of the Noord-Zuidlijn (North–South Line), there would be no more room at Amsterdam Zuid station for Route 51 to continue as express tram service into Amstelveen. According to a long-term regional planning study of 2011, the Amstelveenlijn was to be upgraded to a fully-fledged metro service. On 12 March 2013, however, the regional council of the City Region of Amsterdam decided that Route 51 would be replaced by an improved express tram service running from Westwijk to Zuid Station and a separate metro service running from Zuid Station and Amstel Station. Passengers from Amstelveen would then be required to change at Zuid Station to the metro route for Amstel or to the new Route 52 for Centraal Station. It was also decided that Tram Route 5 would run between Amstelveen and Westergasfabriek. Conversion of the southern section of the Amstelveen Line to tram operation started in 2016.

On 3 March 2019, the Amstelveen branch (the hybrid metro/tram line) was cut from route 51 as the tunnel connecting the metro line with the tram network had to make way for an underground section of the A10 motorway. In December 2020, the Amstelveen Line would become tram line 25.

==== Route ====
From Centraal Station to Amsterdam Zuid station, Route 51 ran as a full metro service and had no at-grade intersections. The light-rail vehicles on the line were powered by a third rail with the line being suitable for 3-metre (9 ft 10 in) wide trams. The BN vehicles, however, had a width of 2.65 metres (8 ft 8 in) which was the maximum width on the southern section of the line between Zuid Station and Westwijk. In order to bridge the gap between the trains and the platforms in northern section, the vehicles were equipped with retractable footboards at the doors. In addition, the vehicles were equipped with pantographs in order to retrieve power from the overhead wiring on the southern section. From Zuid Station to Westwijk, the route operated as an express tram service. On the northern half of this section, Route 51 shared tracks with Line 5 of the tramway, with dual height platforms provided at the stops shared by both lines.

Since 3 March 2019, the Amstelveen section of route 51 has been discontinued. Line 51 was upgraded to a full metro line and now runs between Central Station and Isolatorweg. Since December 2020, tram line 25 has been serving the route from Zuid Station to Westwijk.

=== Ring Line (Route 50) ===
Opened on 1 June 1997, the Ringlijn (Ring Line or Circle Line) is entirely built on embankments and viaducts, and has no level crossings. The line was initially for political reasons called "express circle tram", but since the opening of the Ring Line the transit service on the line is referred to as a Metro Route 50 (from Gein to Isolatorweg). Because it was originally considered a tram line, the light rail vehicle width of 2,65 meters was to be applied; the width that was also used on the Amstelveen Line. The new "trams" (Series M4 and S3) have retractable running boards to bridge the space between the vehicle and the platform at existing stations. Since Route 50 proved hugely popular, the express tram vehicles were insufficient to handle the number of passengers. Instead of ordering additional vehicles, in 2000 the city of Amsterdam decided to adjust the platforms at the stations between Amstelveenseweg and Isolatorweg, whereby the older rolling stock (M1, M2 and M3) serving on the East Line could also serve on the Ring Line. Such an operation was already taken into account during the construction of the stations.

=== North–South line (Route 52) ===
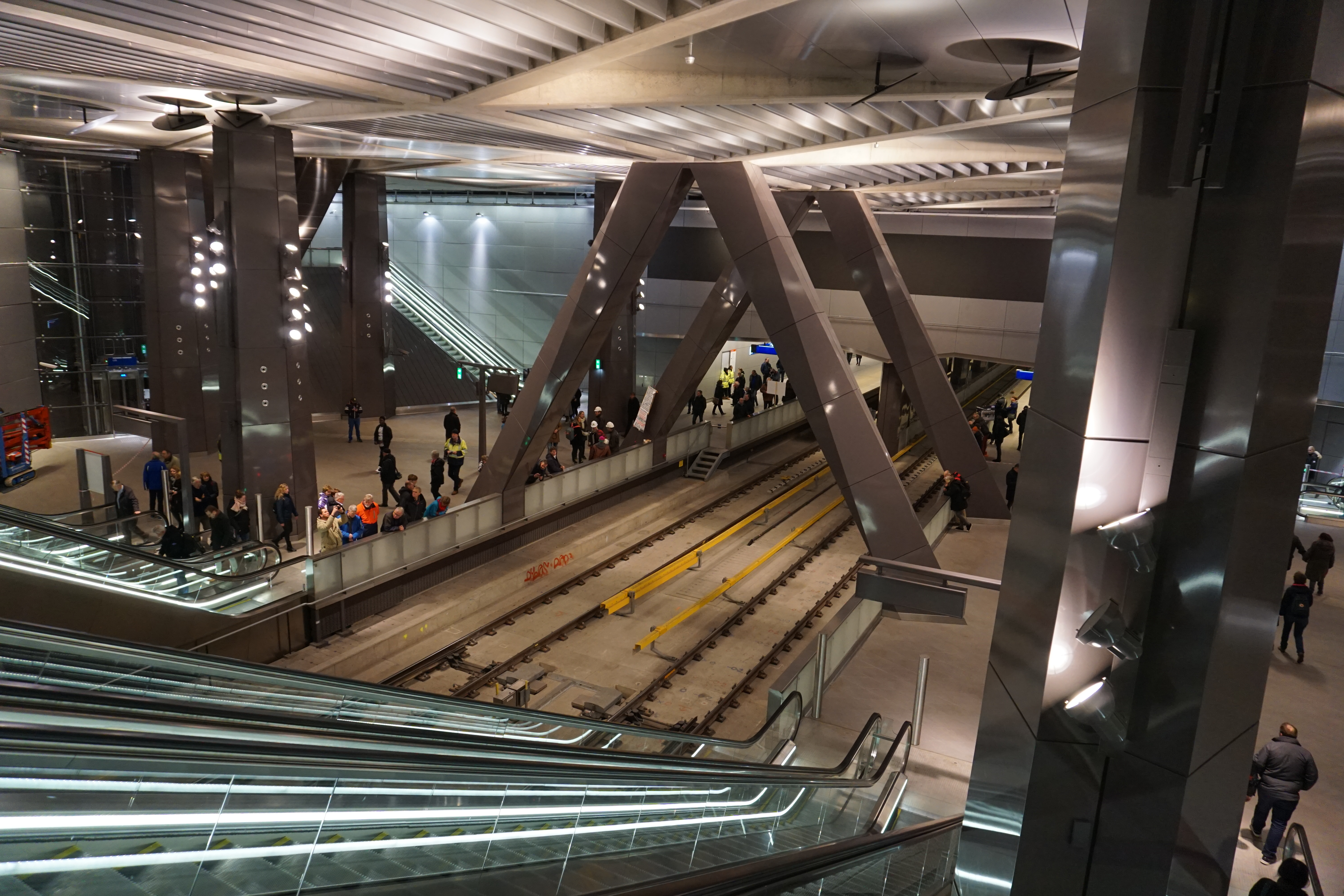
Platforms of the North–South Line at Amsterdam Centraal

In 2002, the construction of the Noord/Zuidlijn (North–South line) was started. The new metro line is the first to serve the Amsterdam North district, via a tunnel under the IJ. From there, it runs via Amsterdam Centraal to Amsterdam Zuid, which is planned to become the second biggest transport hub in the city, after Amsterdam Centraal. The line includes a mixture of bored tunnels and immersed tunnels under the IJ.

The construction programme experienced several difficulties, mainly at Amsterdam Centraal, resulting in the project running more than 40% over budget and the opening being delayed several times. The project initially had a budget of €1.46 billion, but after several setbacks the total cost estimate has been adjusted to €3.1 billion (at 2009 prices). The original planned opening was for 2011, but eventually the line was opened on 21 July 2018.

The North–South line might be extended to Amsterdam Airport Schiphol in the future. In August 2014, it was announced that the line was to be equipped with 4G mobile phone coverage, to be funded jointly by the major mobile phone operators.

=== Network changes in 2027 ===
The network after the network changes in December 2027

On 24 November 2025, the Amsterdam Transport Authority decided to modify the metro network starting in December 2027. Line 53 will be discontinued, while the route of Line 50 (new number: M3) will be changed. Instead of Isolatorweg – Gein, the new route will be Isolatorweg – Gaasperplas. Between Van der Madeweg and Gaasperplas, Line 50 will take over the route of Line 53, while between Van der Madeweg and Gein, Line 50 will disappear and only Line 54 (new number: M4) will remain. As a result, Van der Madeweg station will become an important transfer station for travel between Amsterdam Zuidoost and the rest of the city. There was considerable opposition to this plan, especially from residents along the route of Line 53, who will lose their direct connection to the city center and will henceforth have to transfer to Line 54. In addition, lines 52 and 51 will renamed M1 and M2, respectively, resulting in the following network:

- M1: Noord – Zuid
- M2: Isolatorweg – Centraal Station
- M3: Isolatorweg – Gaasperplas
- M4: Centraal Station – Gein

== Planned expansion ==
The tram line to IJburg in the east was originally planned to be a metro line. For this reason, a short tunnel was constructed eastwards from Centraal Station underneath the railway lines. As this line was eventually constructed for tram services, the tunnel was abandoned, and there are plans to use it as part of a chocolate museum. There are still plans for the tram to IJburg to be upgraded to metro and connect to the nearby city of Almere.

On completion of the north–south metro line, Amsterdam Municipality announced it was analysing a possible east–west line at a projected cost of €7 billion.

In January 2019, the CEO of Amsterdam Airport Schiphol, Dick Benschop, announced that agreements had been reached to extend the north–south line to the airport and Hoofddorp. In June 2019, the province of North Holland outlined plans to extend the metro to Zaandam and Purmerend along with Schiphol and Hoofddorp. A station box has already been constructed for a potential underground station in Sixhaven, on the north–south line between Noorderpark and Centraal, to be opened at a later date.

== Ridership ==
Year	Ridership (million passenger trips)	Source
2015	66.2	
2018	90.3	
2019	111.3	
2020	54.3	
2021	54.1	
2022	84.3	
2023	108.7	
2024	116.4	

=== Notes ===
- Figures represent annual metro passenger boardings (reizigersritten) only.
- GVB introduced a revised passenger-counting methodology in 2024; 2023 figures were recalculated for comparability.

== Technology ==
=== Rolling stock ===
As of January 2016, the Amsterdam Metro system operates 90 electric multiple unit (EMU) trainsets. All use standard-gauge track and run on a 750 V DC third rail electrification system.

==== M1/M2/M3 ====
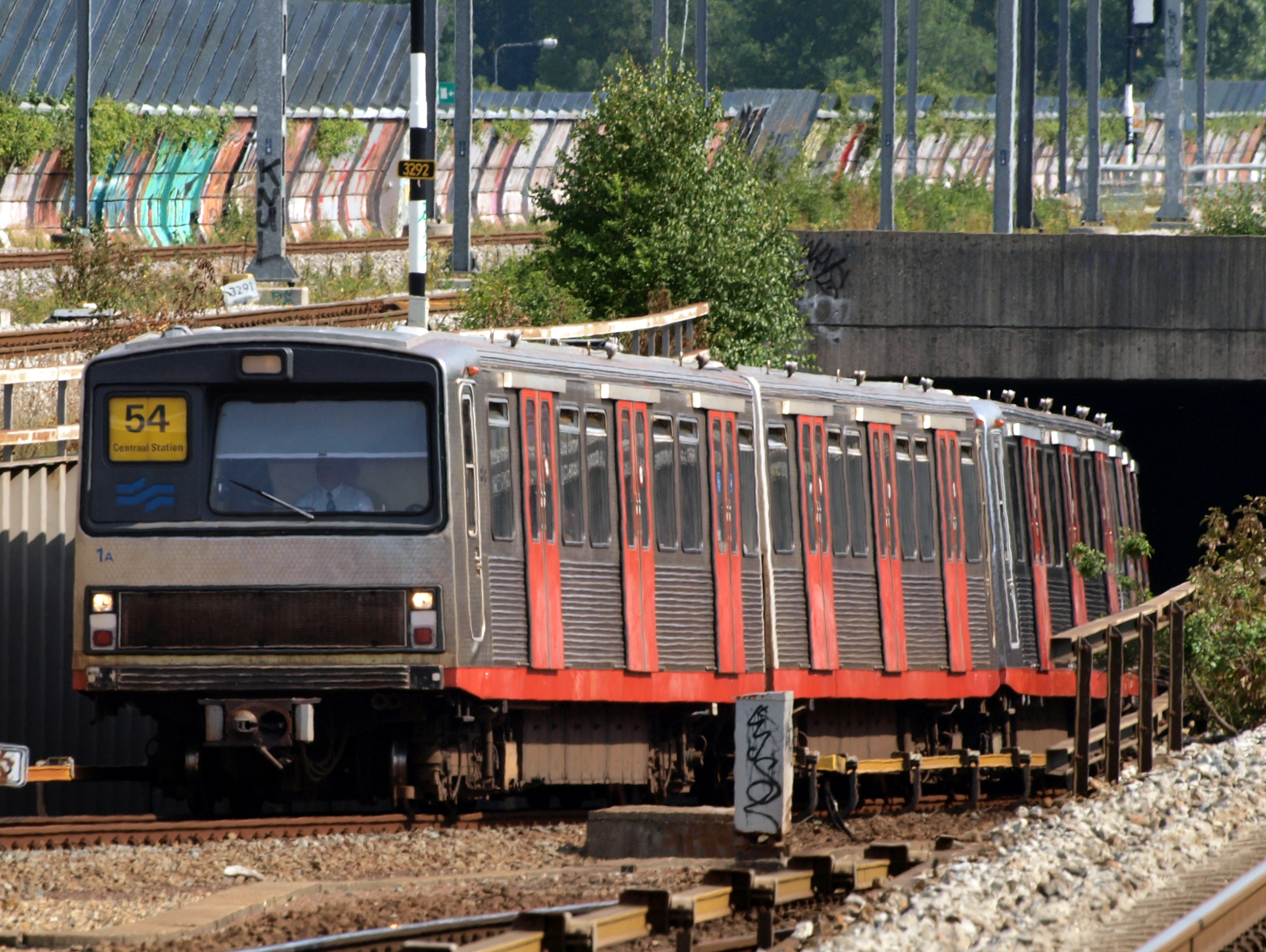
The first M1 train built, operating on Line 54 in 2009

The original, first-generation fleet consisted of types M1, M2, and M3, designed as four-axle, two-car sets manufactured by the German firm Linke-Hofmann-Busch and delivered between 1973 and 1980. The M1 units were the original four prototype trainsets delivered in 1973 for testing ahead of the metro line's opening. The M2 series comprised the main production run of 33 trainsets built between 1976 and 1977. The M3 series was an expansion order of 7 additional trainsets delivered in 1980. The original M1 units were rebuilt in 1980 to the same specifications as the M3 series.

The 44 first-generation trainsets were nicknamed zilvermeeuw (lit. 'herring gull') because of their unpainted steel bodies, which gave them a silvery appearance. In 2009, all trains received new interior designs by various artists.

As they were built to full metro carrying capacity, they were used mainly on the East Line services, Routes 53 and 54, with occasional use on Route 50.

As they neared the end of their life cycle and spare parts no longer available, the entire fleet of was gradually retired from 2012 to 2015, being replaced by the modern M5 trains. The last unit (No. 23) was retired after a farewell tour on 19 December 2015 and has been preserved as a heritage train. All other units have been scrapped, with the final scrapping taking place in December 2015.

==== S1/S2 and S3/M4 ====
The second-generation fleet consisted of smaller, narrower two-section, 6-axle units that could operate both on the main metro network and the express tram ("sneltram") line to Amstelveen.

The S1 and S2 trainsets were built by La Brugeoise et Nivelles and entered service in 1990 on line 51 (the sneltram). These dual-mode units can run on the metro's 750 V DC third rail system and the tram's 600 V DC overhead line system. The tram sections of the line also had a narrower loading gauge, and the cars were equipped with retractable footboards to fill the gap between the car and metro platforms. They operated exclusively on Route 51.

The S3 and M4 series, built by CAF and introduced in 1997, expanded the fleet. They were built similarly to the S1 and S2 trainsets with retractable footboards along their sides to accommodate the differing loading gauges. The four S3 sets retained pantographs for use on line 51, while M4 sets are third-rail only and primarily operate on line 50. The platforms on the Ring Line used by line 50 were originally built to the smaller tram loading gauge but were later narrowed to the metro gauge to accommodate the older but wider M1–M3 sets. When that happened, the footboards on the M4 fleet were permanently locked in the extended position. In 2016, the M4 vehicles were equipped for semi-automatic operation using Alstom's CBTC-based Urbalis system, making them capable of fully-automatic operation, however, they remain controlled by drivers for the time being.

Although It was significantly possible to make the M4 series run towards the Amstelveenlijn, And make the S1/S2 Series to Serve M50, GVB thought it was too expensive to make 37 sets (S3 has 4 sets while M4 has 33 sets) to have their floorboards to rise and fall down everytime.Because of this, the M51 line often faced a shortage of metros.Some people still think that, even after 25 years of the M51 and M50 running, this could've been done.By 2019, GVB finally cut off the Amstelveenlijn to serve the M51 towards Isolatorweg, making it a Ringlijn (Note: The M50 was the Original Ringlijn, M51 is just an additional Ringlijn).

Amsterdam Metro has been working to retire this second-generation fleet as the dual-mode, dual-gauge systems introduced significant complexity and additional moving parts. With the conversion of the sneltram line to the Amsteltram in 2019, the S1 and S2 trainsets were retired between 2021 and 2024. With the arrival of the M7 trains, the S3 and M4 trainsets are scheduled to be replaced by 2027.

==== M5 ====
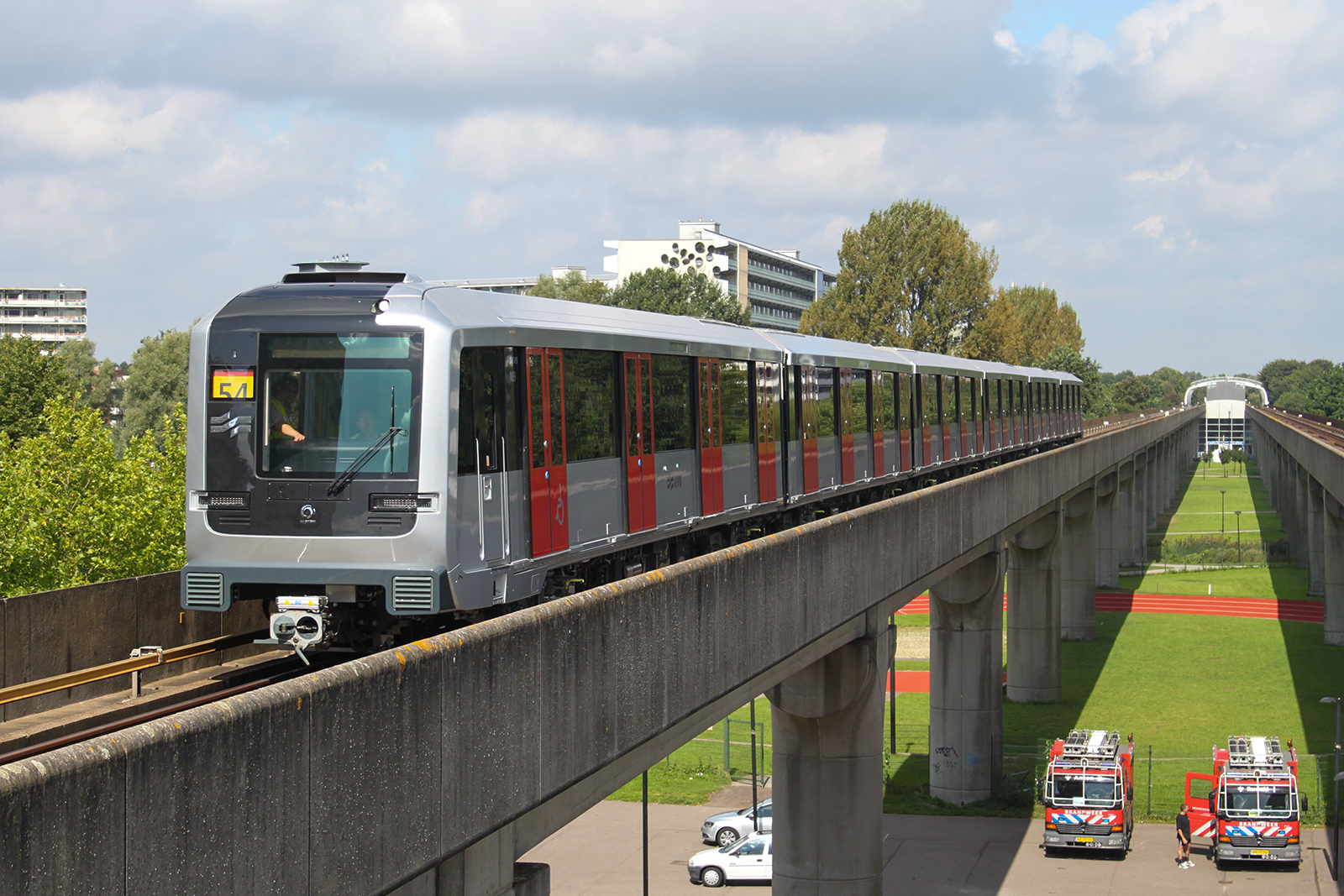
M5 train near Kraaiennest station

The third-generation fleet, the M5 series, was introduced in 2013 and built by Alstom Konstal based on the Metropolis platform. These are fully walk-through six-car trainsets capable of carrying up to 1,000 passengers each. They can operate on all lines and are equipped with Alstom's CBTC-based Urbalis system, making them capable of fully-automatic operation, however, they remain controlled by drivers for the time being. All M5 sets feature air conditioning, LED lighting, and a longitudinal seating layout to maximize standing space. Trainsets are composed of two three-car halves that are semi-permanently coupled. The M5 fleet replaced the M1/M2/M3 sets on the East Line, provided a fleet for the new Route 52 and increased overall capacity on the generally overstretched metro network. The exterior design and colour scheme draws inspiration from the original M1/M2/M3 series.

==== M7 ====
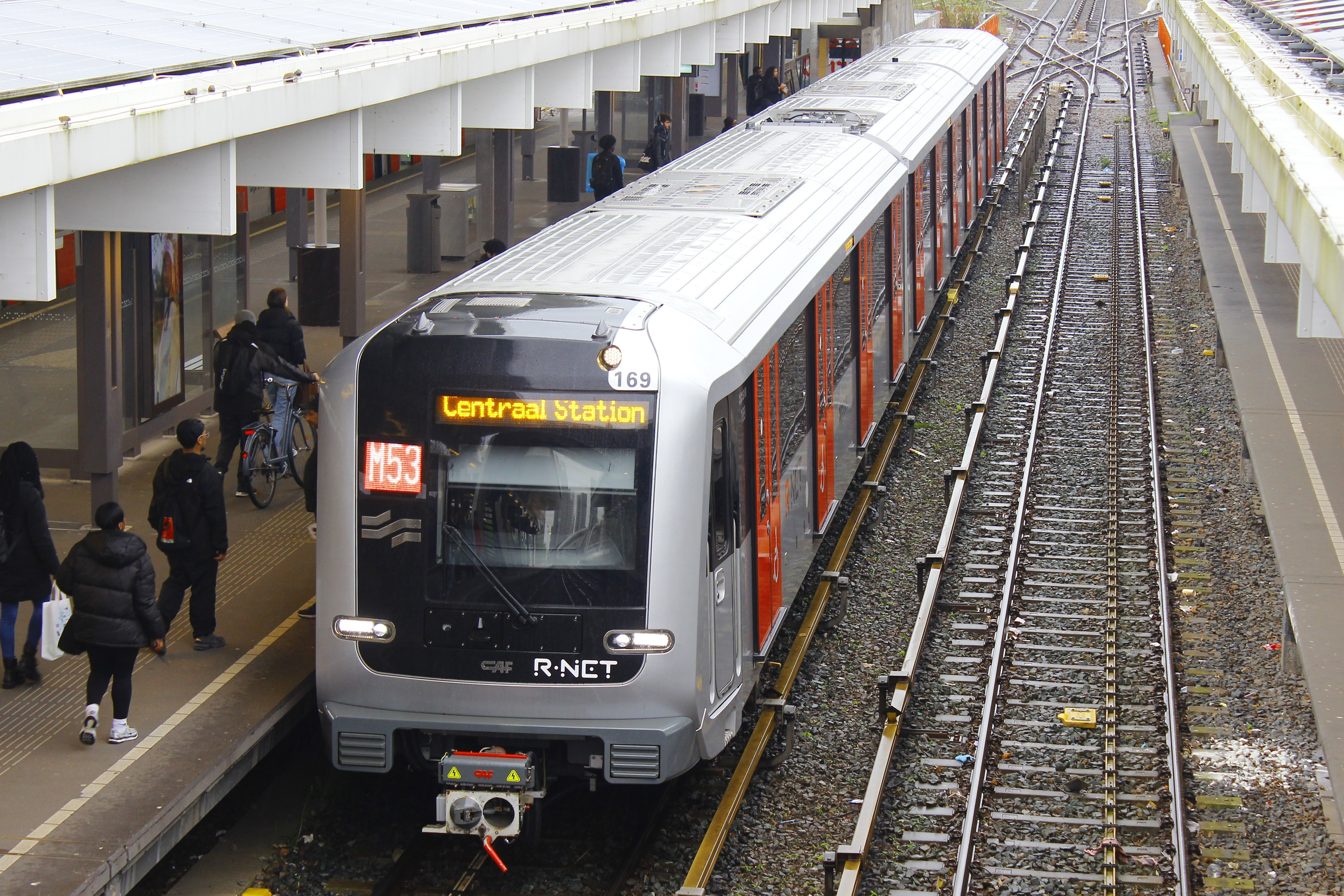
M7 trainset Van der Madeweg station

The M7 series is a continuation of the third-generation fleet. After the introduction of the M5 series, it became clear that the long trains could lead to overcapacity during off-peak hours and complicate maintenance, since all six carriages would need to be taken out of service at once. As a result, further purchases were stopped. Instead, the M7 series was purchased: shorter, three-car trains with open gangways and a total length of about 61 metres (200 ft). The M7 can operate in pairs during peak times to match the capacity of a single M5 train, while single sets can run during quieter periods, helping to avoid overcapacity and allowing for more flexible maintenance. The M7 is built by CAF and is based on the Inneo platform. The exterior design of the M7 series was intentionally made to match the M5. The fleet is capable of fully-automatic operation, however, they remain controlled by drivers for the time being. The initial order of 30 M7 trainsets replaced the S1/S2 fleet, and a future order is expected to replace the S3/M4 fleet by 2027. These trains are primarily used on lines 50, 53, and 54.Some people find this metro the "metro-vervanger" which means "Metro replacer" because it replaces the Entire 2nd Generation of the metros.

==== Summary ====
	M1/M2/M3	S1/S2	S3/M4	M5/M6	M7/M8
Type	Metro	Metro/tram	Metro/tram	Metro	Metro
Qty (sets)	44 [M1 (4),M2 (33),M3 (7)]	25 [S1 (13), S2 (12)]	37 [S3 (4),M4 (33)]	28[M5 (23), M6 (5)]	30 [M7 (30), M8 (13)]
Cars per set	2	2	2	6	3
Primary line(s)	53 54	51	50 51	50 51 52 53 54	50 53 54
Builder	LHB	BN	CAF	Alstom Konstal	CAF
Length	37.5 m (123 ft 3/8 in)	30.6 m (100 ft 4 3/4 in)	30.9 m (101 ft 4 1/2 in)	116.2 m (381 ft 2 3/4 in)	59.6 m (195 ft 6 1/2 in)
Width	3 m (9 ft 10 1/8 in)	2.65 m (8 ft 8 3/8 in)	2.65 m (8 ft 8 3/8 in)	3 m (9 ft 10 1/8 in)	3 m (9 ft 10 1/8 in)
Weight (empty)	57 t (126,000 lb)	46 t (101,000 lb)	48 t (106,000 lb)	192 t (423,000 lb)	85 t (187,000 lb)
Max speed	70 km/h (43 mph)	70 km/h (43 mph)	70 km/h (43 mph)	90 km/h (56 mph)	80 km/h (50 mph)
Power	4 × 195 kW (261 hp)	6 × 74 kW (99 hp)	6 × 70 kW (94 hp)	16 × 200 kW (270 hp)	
Operation	1977–2015	1990–2024	1997–present	2013–present	2023–present

=== Ticketing system ===
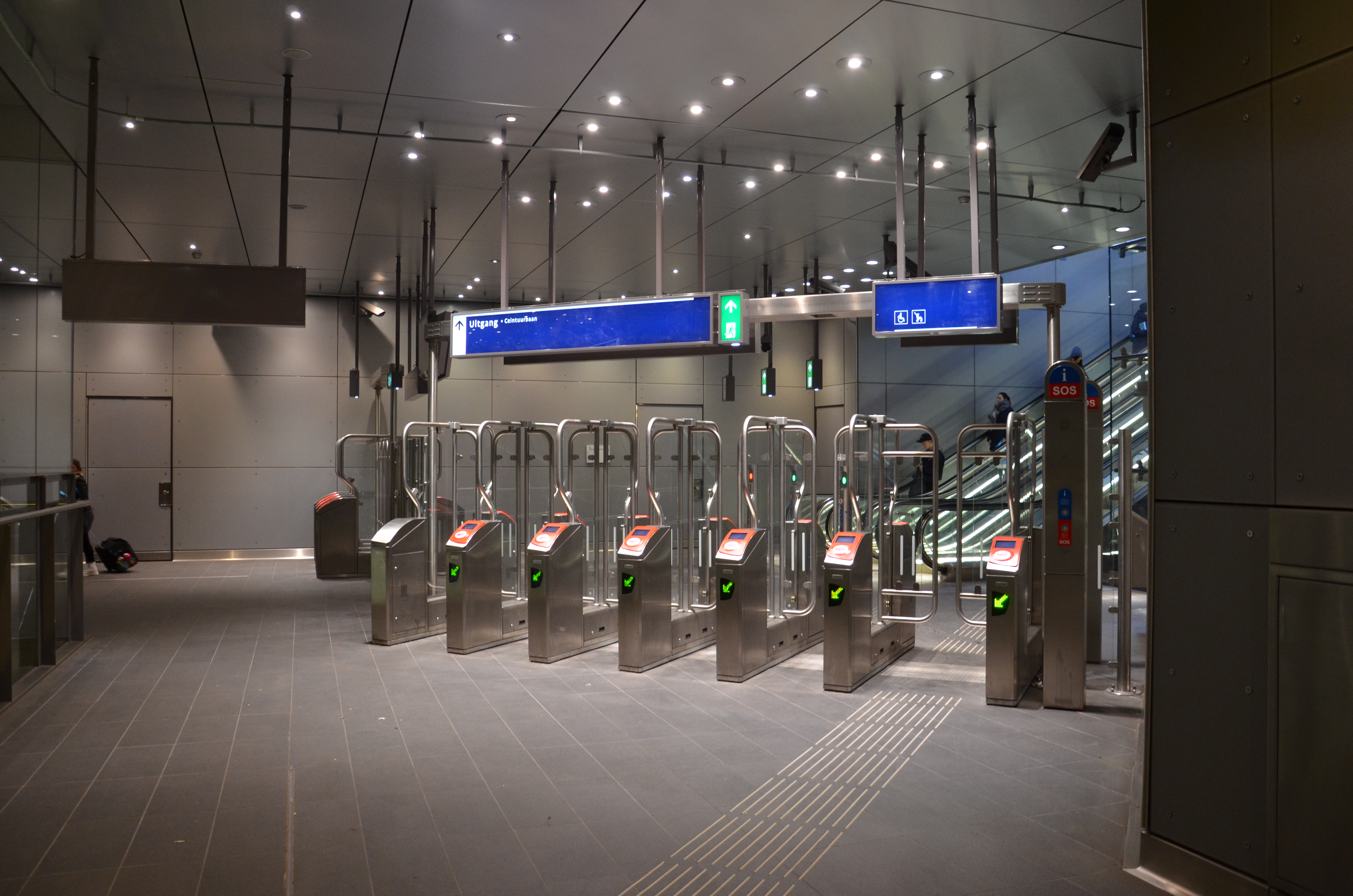
Ticket barriers for the OV-chipkaart at De Pijp

The OV-chipkaart, a nationwide contactless smart card system, is the primary form of ticketing on the metro system. It replaced the strippenkaart system on 27 August 2009, after the two systems had operated in parallel since 2006. Ticket barriers have been installed in all metro stations, with free-standing card readers provided at locations where platforms are shared with train or tram lines.

=== Graphic design ===
Signage on the Amsterdam Metro system has featured multiple styles across different eras. The original 1974 signage used the M.O.L. typeface, specially designed for the metro by Gerard Unger. The letterforms have enlarged internal spaces to improve legibility when illuminated. The name M.O.L. refers to the Dutch word mol, which means "mole" in English. A proposal to use a mole as the metro's mascot was rejected by city authorities.

Other versions include the 1991 signage used on the Amstelveen Line, the 1995 version found mainly on the Ring Line featuring GVB branding, and a 2009 update to the GVB-branded signage, which has replaced earlier styles at many stations.

In 2016, the Amsterdam regional transport authority commissioned a new signage system and logo to harmonize all signage and wayfinding elements across metro lines, in preparation for the renovation of the East Line and the opening of the North–South Line. The new design is based on the existing R-net branding, though somewhat modified. It uses the Profile typeface and recalls Unger's original design through its use of blue, white, and red design elements.

All wayfinding systems introduced after the original 1974 design have been created by Paul Mijksenaar.

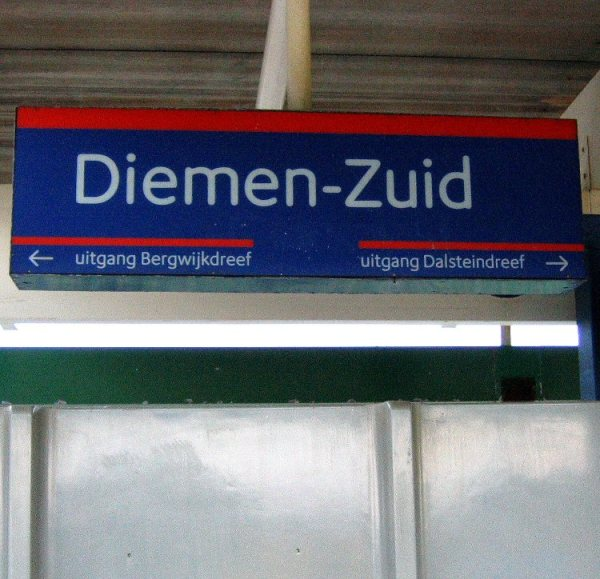
1974 original design, featuring M.O.L. typeface

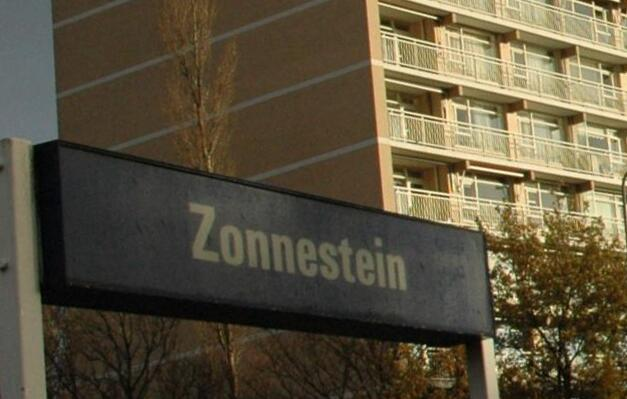
1991 Amstelveen Line style sign

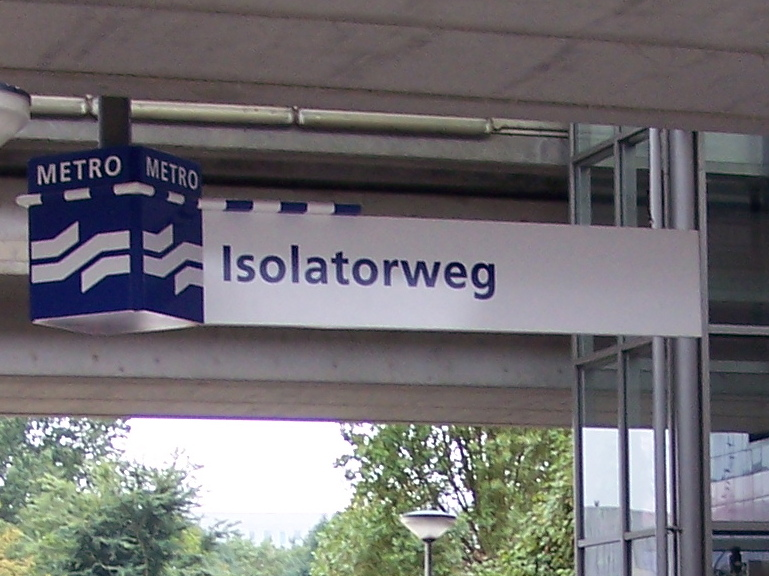
1995 GVB style sign

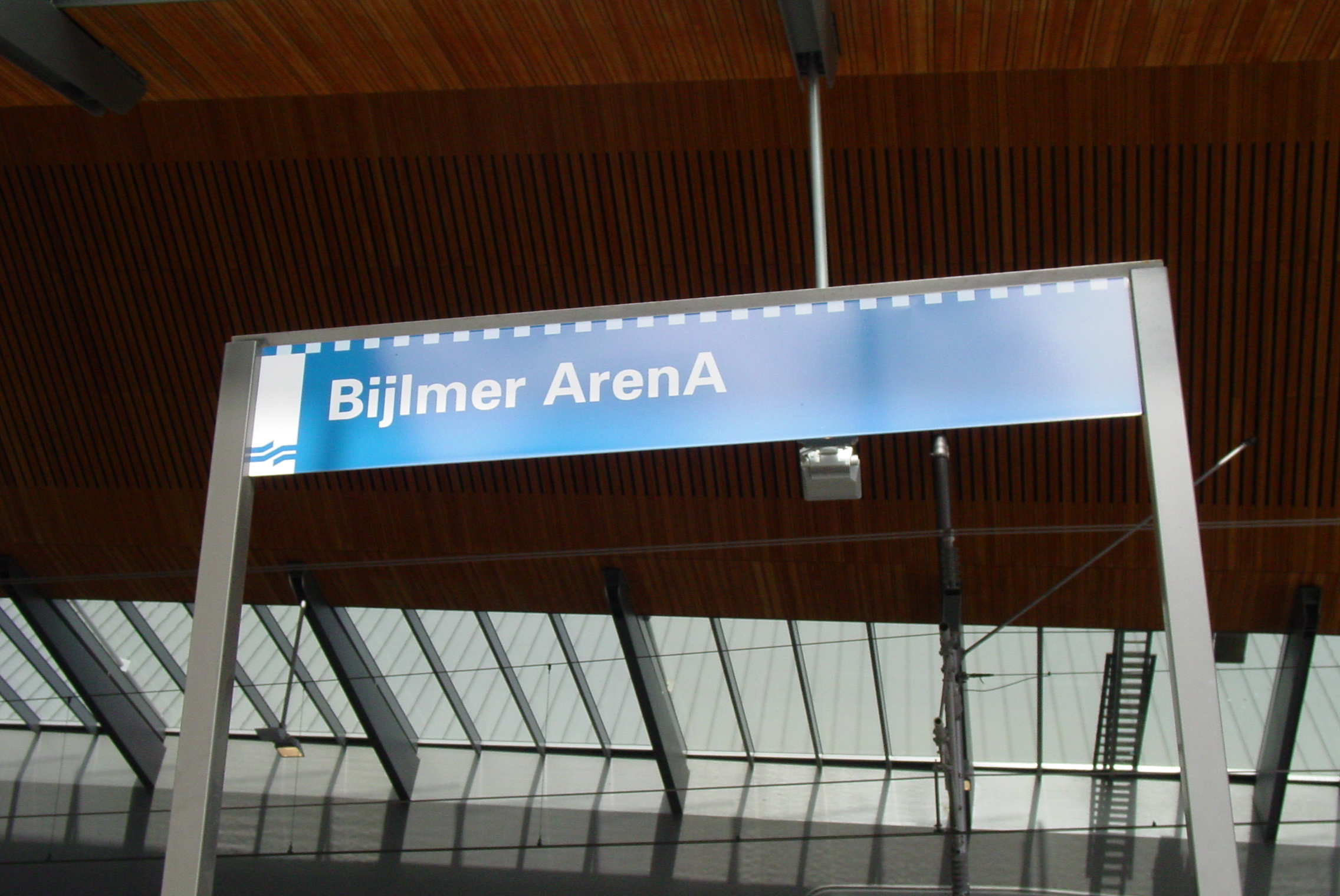
2009 GVB style sign

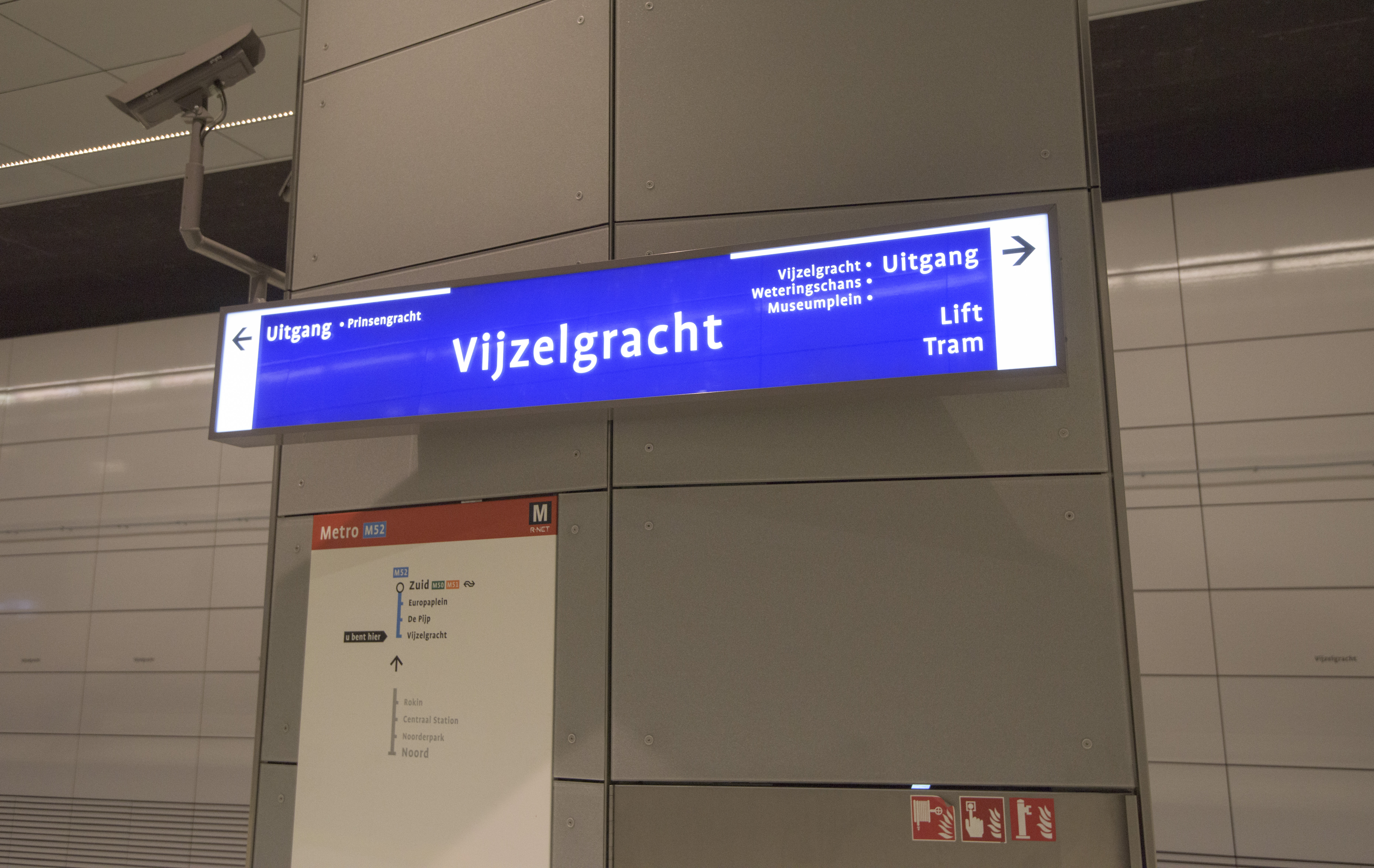
2016 style sign

== See also ==
- Transport in Amsterdam
- Trams in Amsterdam
- Gemeentelijk Vervoerbedrijf (GVB)
