= Gaasperplas metro station =

Metro station in Amsterdam

Coordinates: 52°18′40″N 4°59′4″E

Gaasperplas
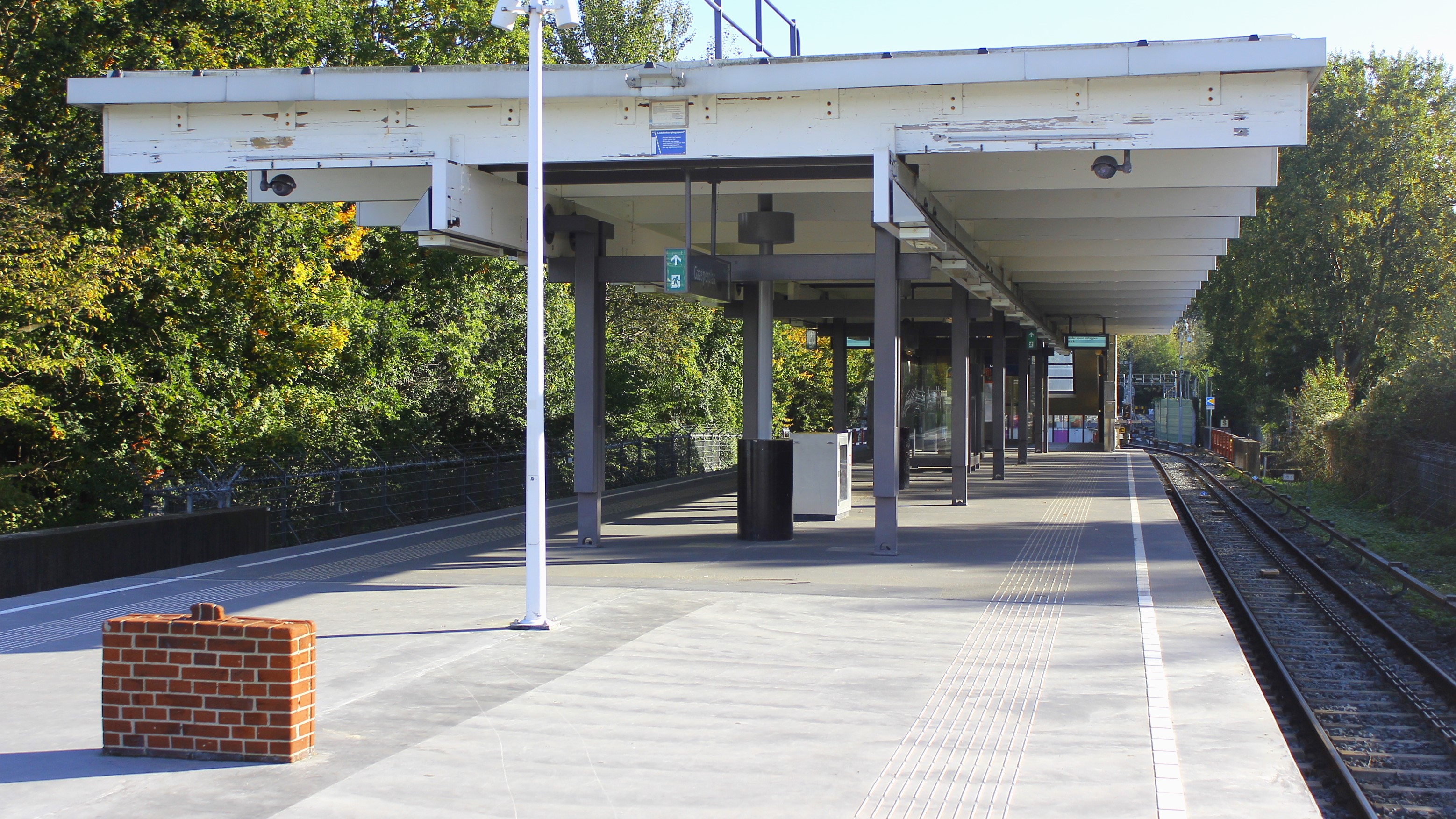

General information
- Owner: GVB
- Platforms: 2

History
- Opened: 16 October 1977

Services
| Preceding station | Amsterdam Metro | Following station |
|---|---|---|
| Kraaiennest towards Centraal Station | Line 53 | Terminus |
Location

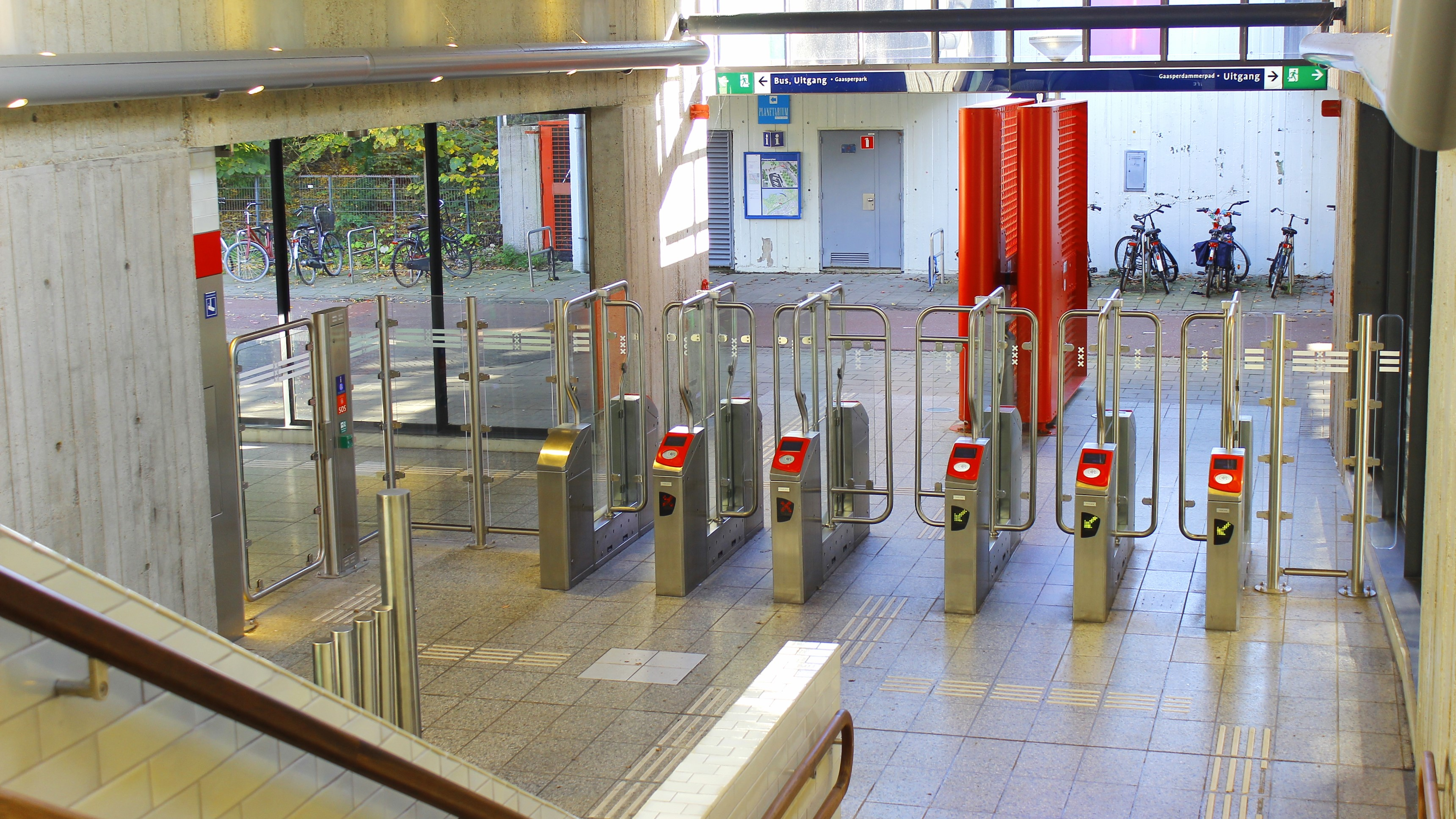
Station entrance

Gaasperplas is an Amsterdam Metro station in Amsterdam, Netherlands.
