= List of railway stations in Amsterdam =

This is an index for the Amsterdam railway stations. Amsterdam is the capital of the Netherlands. The operator of all trains within and around Amsterdam is the Nederlandse Spoorwegen.

- Amsterdam Centraal also known as Amsterdam Central. This is Amsterdam's main station.
- Amsterdam Amstel This station on the eastern bank of the river Amstel is on the Amsterdam to Utrecht railway line.
- Amsterdam Bijlmer ArenA This is the main station for the south-eastern outskirts of Amsterdam. It is close to the Amsterdam ArenA stadium, as well as some major shopping and business centres.
- Amsterdam Holendrecht A new station, in south-eastern Amsterdam, that opened December 2008 on the Amsterdam to Utrecht railway line. It is close to the AMC hospital.
- Amsterdam Lelylaan Originally an Intercity station, now a local train station in the western Slotervaart borough of Amsterdam.
- Amsterdam Muiderpoort A junction station in Amsterdam-East, connecting the lines from Amsterdam Centraal to Hilversum and Utrecht.
- Amsterdam RAI A station in the south of Amsterdam, close to the RAI convention centre.
- Amsterdam Science Park A station in the east of Amsterdam in the Watergraafsmeer area and also close to the Science Park Amsterdam. Opened in 2009.
- Amsterdam Sloterdijk A station with two levels in the west of Amsterdam, moved during the construction of the Schiphol line. It allows passengers to change between the directions Amsterdam Centraal, Haarlem, Schiphol and Zaandam.
- Amsterdam Sloterdijk Hemboog Opened 2008, to be completed in 2009. This is an extra stop for trains on the direct railway between Zaandam and Schiphol.
- Amsterdam Zuid An Intercity station in the south of Amsterdam. Originally, it was called Amsterdam Zuid/WTC due to its proximity to the Amsterdam World Trade Centre.
- Duivendrecht railway station is a combined rail and metro station in Duivendrecht, Netherlands. The station opened on May 23, 1993 as part of the extension of the Zuidtak of the Amsterdam Ringspoorbaan, between Amsterdam RAI and Weesp. This station allows for the interchange between two grade-separated railways: Weesp-Leiden and Amsterdam-Anhem

== Former stations ==
- Amsterdam d'Eenhonderd Roe (1839–1842) (Hollandsche IJzeren Spoorweg-Maatschappij)
- Amsterdam Willemspoort (1842–1878) (Hollandsche IJzeren Spoorweg-Maatschappij)
- Amsterdam Weesperpoort (1843–1939)
- Amsterdam Westerdok (1878–1889)
- Amsterdam Oosterdok (1874–1889)
- Amsterdam Haarlemmermeer (Willemspark) (1915–1950)
- Amsterdam De Vlugtlaan (1986–2000) This station was considered superfluous after the completion of the ring line of the Amsterdam metro. It had to be demolished in order to build the Hemboog connection between Zaandam and Schiphol.

== Amsterdam region ==
Railway stations in the Amsterdam area are:

- Duivendrecht A bi-level railway station between Amsterdam Amstel and Amsterdam Bijlmer ArenA. It is on the Amsterdam - Utrecht line and Schiphol - Weesp lines.
- Schiphol An underground railway station for Amsterdam Schiphol Airport.
- Diemen A regional train station situated between Amsterdam Science Park and Weesp on the Amsterdam - Amersfoort line.
- Diemen Zuid A regional train and metro station. It is located between Duivendrecht and Weesp.
- Weesp A regional train station to the southeast of Amsterdam, located on the Amsterdam–Lelystad and Amsterdam-Amersfoort railways. The municipality of Weesp will be disbanded and join Amsterdam following a 2018 referendum.
- Abcoude A regional train station to the south of Amsterdam, located on the Amsterdam–Utrecht line, about 800 meters from the border with Amsterdam municipality.
