= Venserpolder metro station =

Metro station in Amsterdam

Coordinates: 52°19′36″N 4°56′48″E

Venserpolder
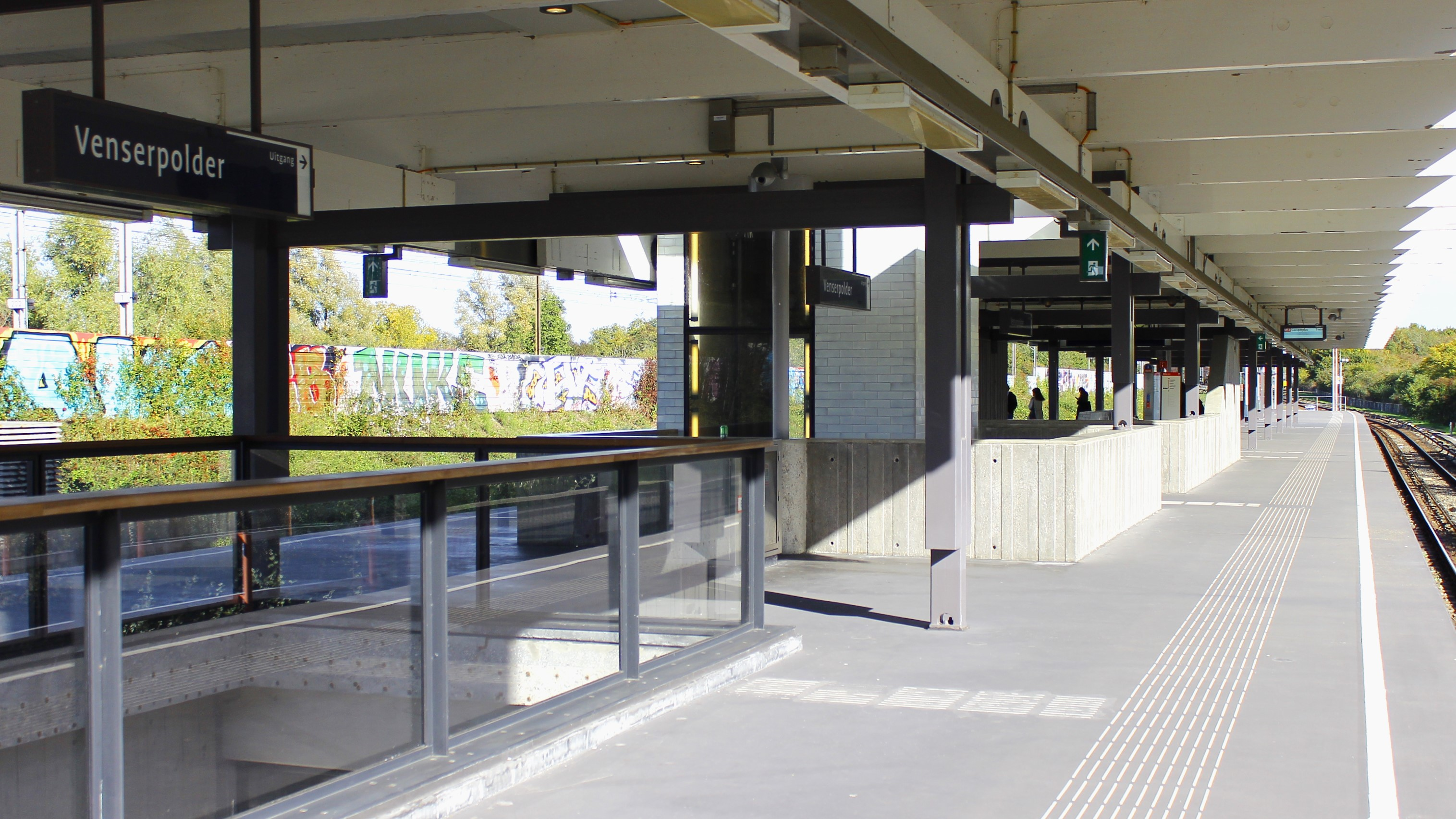

General information
- Owner: GVB
- Platforms: 2

History
- Opened: 16 October 1977

Services
Preceding station	Amsterdam Metro	Following station
Van der Madeweg towards Centraal Station	Line 53	Station Diemen Zuid towards Gaasperplas
Location

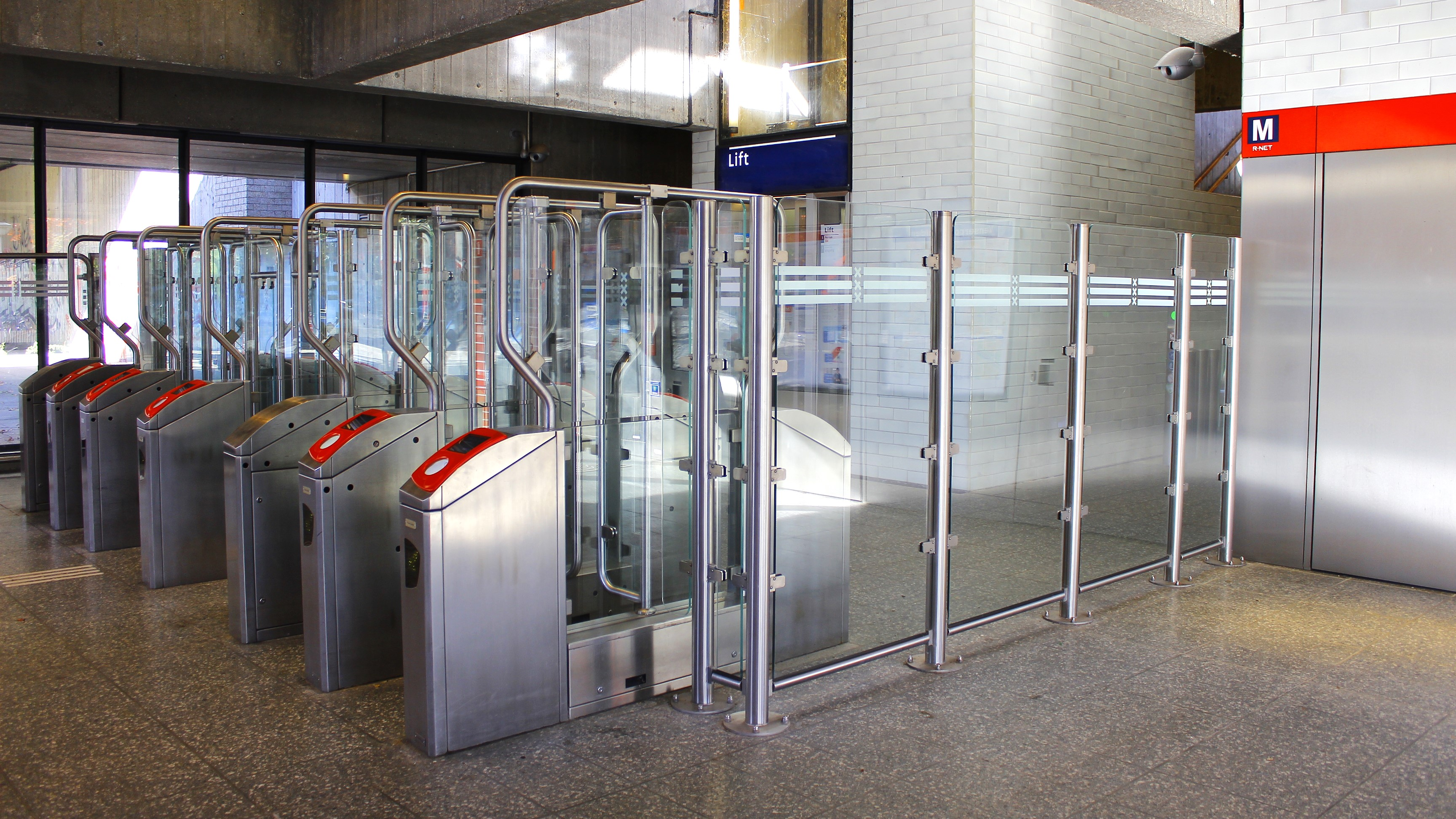
Entrance of the station

Venserpolder is an Amsterdam Metro station in Amsterdam, Netherlands.
