= Voorschoten train crash =

Voorschoten train crash may refer to:

- 1926 Voorschoten train crash
- 2023 Voorschoten train crash
