= Van der Madeweg metro station =

Metro station in Duivendrecht, Netherlands

Van der Madeweg
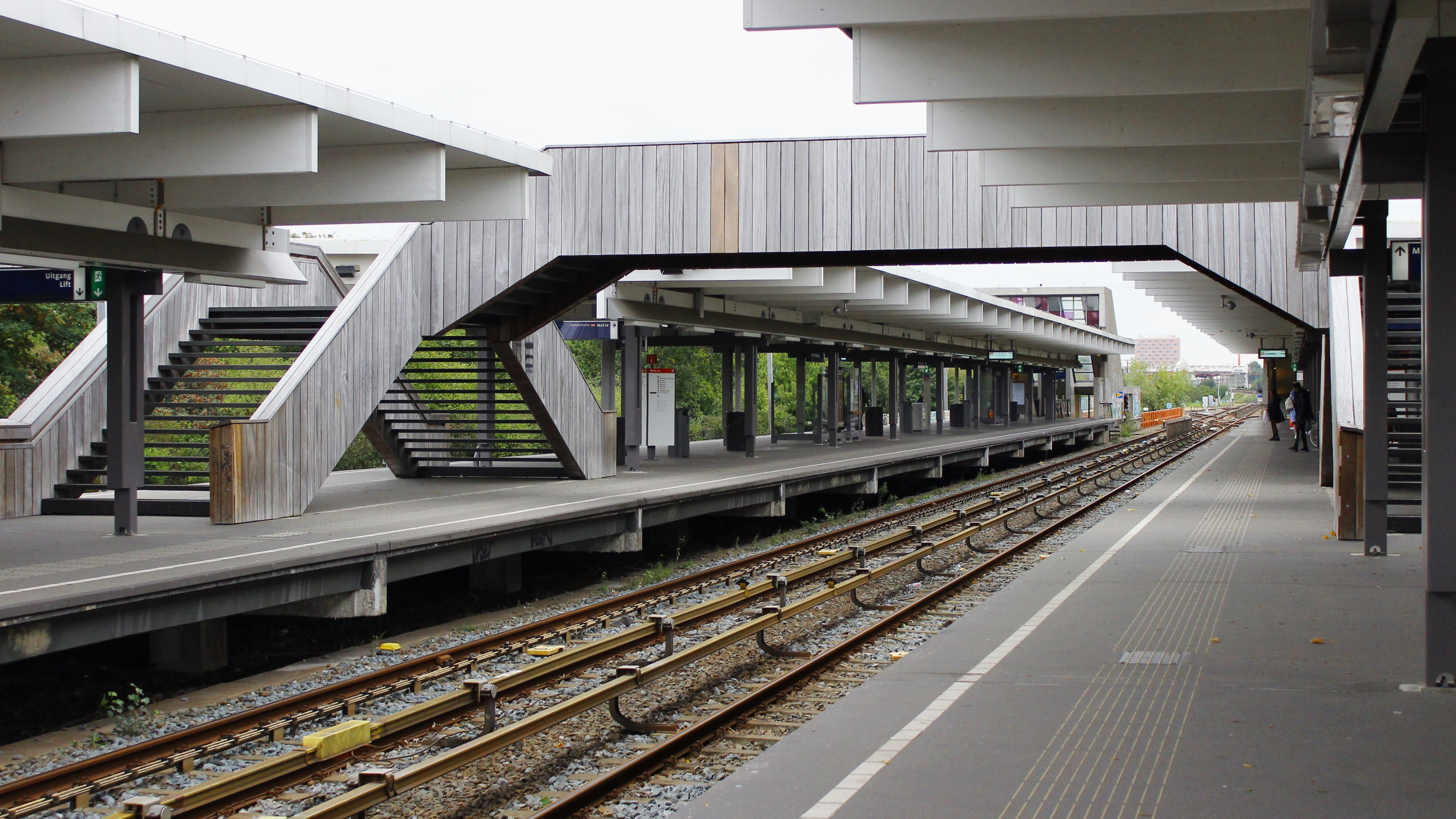

General information
- Location: Van der Madeweg, Duivendrecht, Netherlands
- Coordinates: 52°19′47″N 4°55′49″E
- Owner: GVB
- Line: 50, 53, 54 (Metro)
- Platforms: 4
- Tracks: 4

Construction
- Depth: superficial

Other information
- Fare zone: 5715 (Oost)

History
- Opened: 16 October 1977
- Rebuilt: 2009, 2016

Services
Preceding station	Amsterdam Metro	Following station
Overamstel towards Isolatorweg	Line 50	Station Duivendrecht towards Gein
Spaklerweg towards Centraal Station	Line 53	Venserpolder towards Gaasperplas
Spaklerweg towards Centraal Station	Line 54	Station Duivendrecht towards Gein
Location

Van der Madeweg is an Amsterdam Metro station in Duivendrecht, Netherlands.

== The Station ==
The station opened in 1977 and is served by 3 lines, the 50 (Isolatorweg - Gein), 53 (Amsterdam Centraal - Gaasperplas) and 54 (Amsterdam Centraal - Gein).

The metro station is only accessible with an OV-chipkaart or GVB Travel Pass.

Change at this station between lines 50, 53 and 54.

This station has the metro wasstraat, where the metro cars are washed.

Amsterdam Metro network
