= Overamstel metro station =

Metro station in Amsterdam, Netherlands

Overamstel
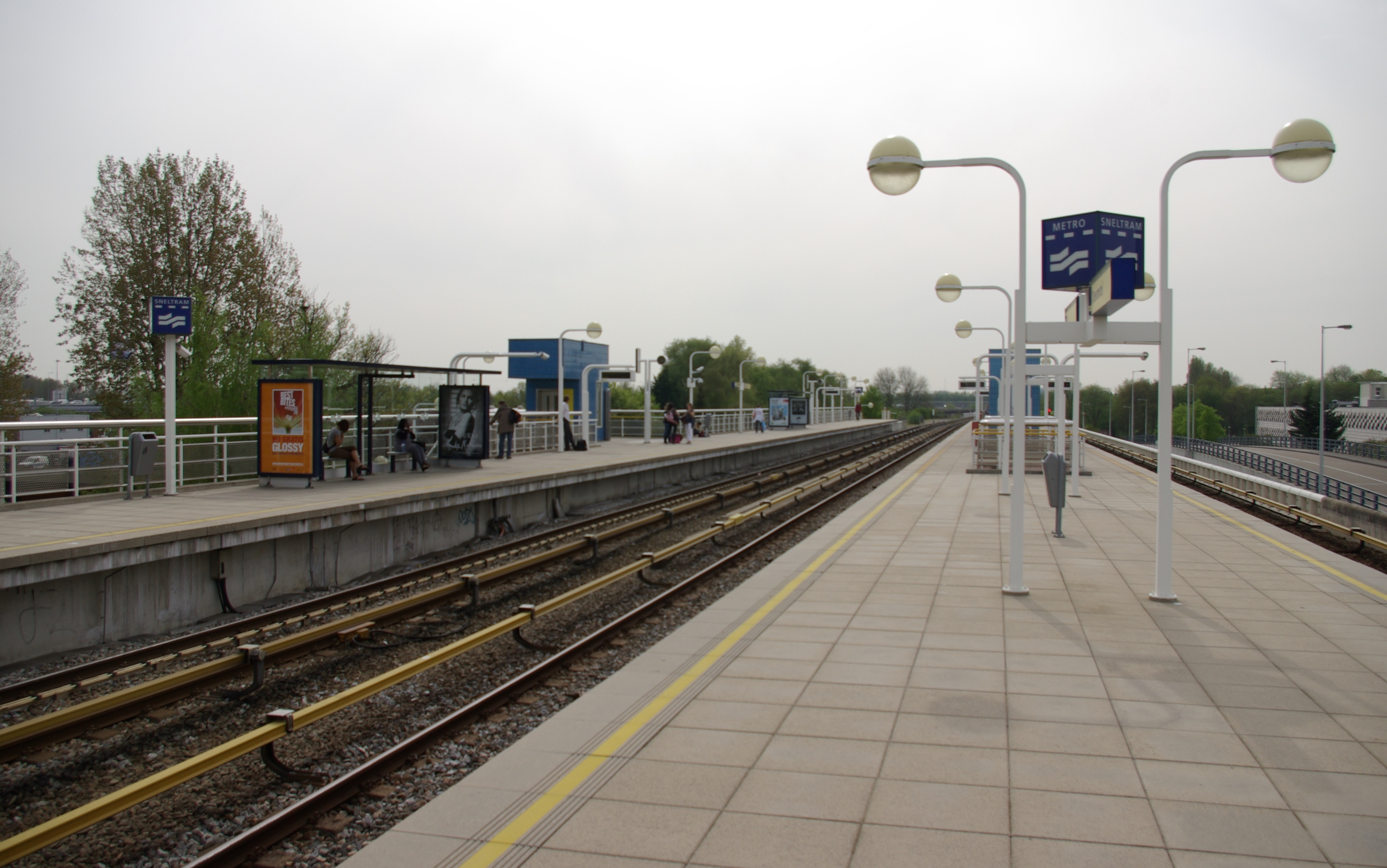

General information
- Location: Overamstel, Amsterdam; Netherlands
- Coordinates: 52°19′53″N 4°55′01″E
- Owner: GVB
- Platforms: 2
- Tracks: 3

Other information
- Fare zone: 5714 (Zuid)/ 5715 (Oost)

History
- Opened: 1 December 1990

Services
Preceding station	Amsterdam Metro	Following station
Van der Madeweg towards Gein	Line 50	Station RAI towards Isolatorweg
Spaklerweg towards Centraal Station	Line 51	Station RAI towards Isolatorweg
Location

Overamstel is an Amsterdam Metro station in the industrial area Overamstel of Amsterdam, Netherlands. It is served by the metro lines 50 and 51 to Isolatorweg, Gein and Centraal Station.

== The Station ==
The station opened in 1990 and is served by 2 lines, the 50 (Isolatorweg - Gein) and the 51 (Isolatorweg - Amsterdam Centraal).

The metro station is only accessible with an OV-chipkaart or GVB Travel Pass.

Change at this station between lines 50 and 51.

Amsterdam Metro network
