= Ringspoorbaan =

Railway line in Netherlands

Ringspoorbaan or ring railway is a railway line in Amsterdam, Netherlands, consisting of a south-eastern branch Zuidtak, and a western branch Westtak. A number of metro lines also connect stations on the Ringspoorbaan.

== History ==
While inchoate plans for the ring had been in place for many decades, parts of it, including several bridges, were built during the recession of the 1930s, when dikes were constructed to provide employment opportunities. However, the ring railway became truly feasible after the Schiphol line opened in 1978. This line provided limited connectivity to Amsterdam RAI railway station, but there was a need to connect to central Amsterdam. The southern segment (Zuidtak) connecting to Weesp railway station became operational in 1993. In 1995, with the completion of the Westtak, direct movement became possible from Schiphol to Amsterdam Centraal.

The Ringspoorbaan was also used for handling traffic to the south. However, with the opening of the Utrechtboog (Utrecht arc) connection in 2006, some of the functionality of the Zuidtak Ringspoorbaan was diluted, and services were reduced to some junctions such as Duivendrecht.
