= Line 53 (Amsterdam Metro) =

Metro line of Amsterdam, Netherlands

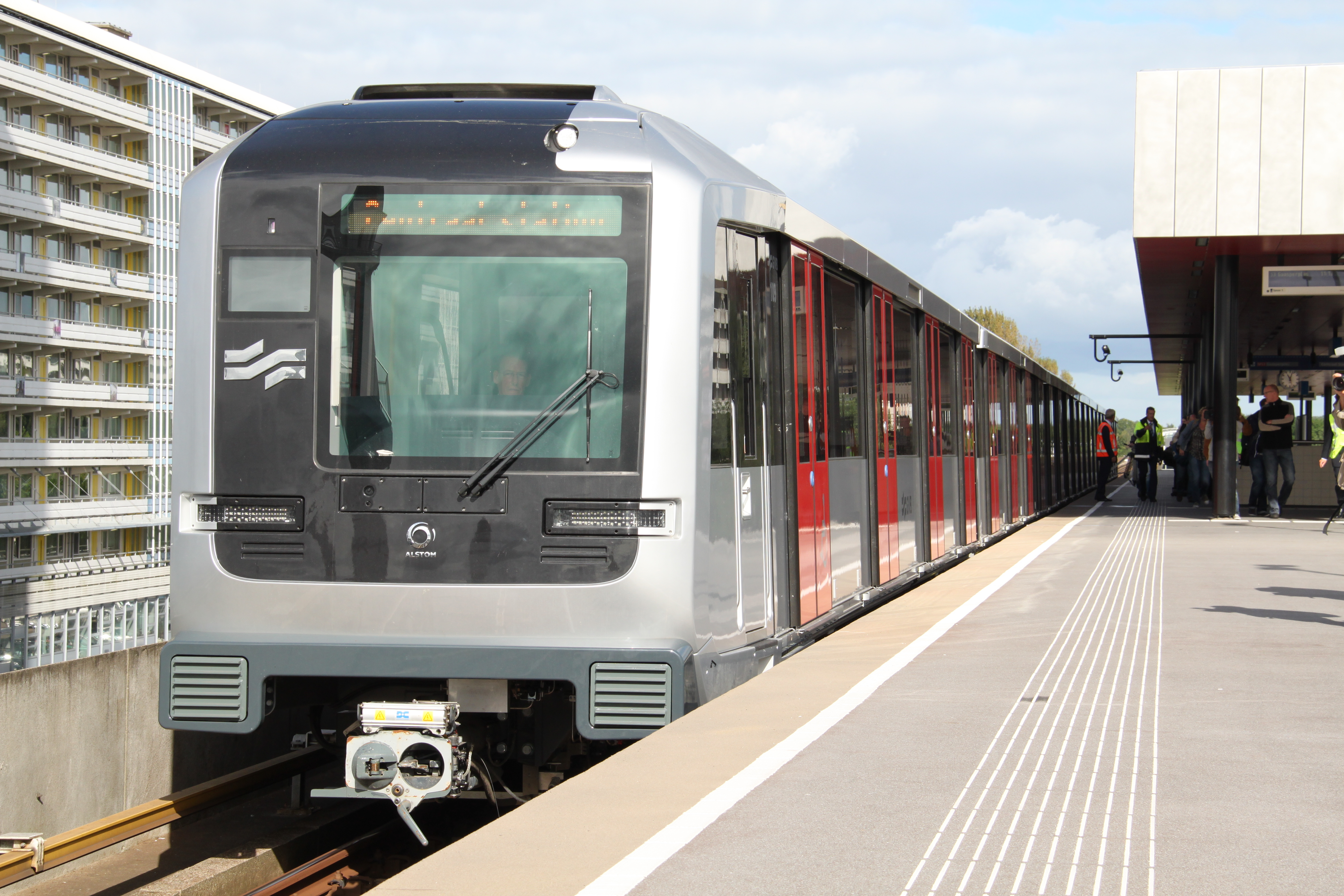
- A M5 series train in Kraaiennest station

Overview
- Native name: Metrolijn 53 / Gaasperplaslijn
- Owner: Amsterdam Metro
- Locale: Amsterdam and Diemen
- Termini: Amsterdam Centraal; Gaasperplas
- Stations: 14
- Color on map: Red

Service
- Type: Rapid transit
- Operator(s): GVB
- Rolling stock: S3/M4; M5; M7
- Daily ridership: 60,000 (2019)

History
- Opened: 16 October 1977; 48 years ago

Technical
- Line length: 11.7 km (7.3 mi)
- Number of tracks: Double-track
- Track gauge: 1,435 mm (4 ft 8 1/2 in) standard gauge
- Electrification: Third rail, 750 V DC
- Operating speed: 70 km/h (43 mph)
Route map

Line 53 (Dutch: Metrolijn 53), also known as the Gaasperplas Line (Dutch: Gaasperplaslijn), is a line of the Amsterdam Metro system. It runs between Amsterdam Centraal in the city center and Gaasperplas metro station in the southeastern neighborhood of Bijlmermeer, a modernist planned community built around the metro line. The line forms the eastern branch of the Oostlijn (East Line).

The initial segment of the line, between Weesperplein and Gaasperplas, opened on 14 October 1977, replacing the former bus line 56. An extension to Amsterdam Centraal was completed on 11 October 1980.

Line 53 is 11.7 kilometres (7.3 mi) and includes 14 stations. It runs underground through central Amsterdam, emerging to the surface as it travels alongside NS railway lines. After Duivendrecht, the line diverges onto its own dedicated, largely elevated right-of-way through Amsterdam-Zuidoost.

In its early years, several stations such as Venserpolder and Diemen Zuid were located in undeveloped areas, resulting in minimal passenger use at the time.

Until 2013, the line was primarily operated using M1, M2, and M3 rolling stock, which were built between 1973 and 1980 specifically for the Oostlijn. These units were gradually phased out and replaced by the M5 series between 2013 and 2015. The M7 series later entered service beginning in 2023.

== Service ==
Train frequency
Time period	Frequency
Rush hour and daytime	10 minutes
Early morning (before 07:00), evenings (after 20:00), and weekends (before 10:00)	15 minutes
Evenings (until 20:00) and weekends (after 10:00)	12 minutes
Midsummer rush hour and daytime	12 minutes
Midsummer early morning, evenings, and weekends	15 minutes

=== Station list ===
Station	Transfers	Borough
Centraal Station	51 Line 51; 52 Line 52; 54 Line 54; Amsterdam–Rotterdam railway; Amsterdam–Schiphol railway; Amsterdam–Arnhem railway; Amsterdam–Zutphen railway; Den Helder–Amsterdam railway	Centrum
Nieuwmarkt	51 Line 51; 54 Line 54	Centrum
Waterlooplein	51 Line 51; 54 Line 54	Centrum
Weesperplein	51 Line 51; 54 Line 54	Centrum
Wibautstraat	51 Line 51; 54 Line 54	Oost
Amstel	51 Line 51; 54 Line 54; Amsterdam–Arnhem railway	Oost
Spaklerweg	51 Line 51; 54 Line 54	Oost
Van der Madeweg	50 Line 50; 54 Line 54	Oost
Venserpolder		Oost
Diemen Zuid	Weesp–Leiden railway	Diemen
Verrijn Stuartweg		Diemen
Ganzenhoef		Zuidoost
Kraaiennest		Zuidoost
Gaasperplas		Zuidoost

== Derailments ==
On Wednesday, April 20, 1983, the last car of a 3 car train derailed next to the Centraal Station. Getting the train back on the rails was a lengthy job due to the limited space inside the tunnel. As a result, Metro traffic between the Centraal Station and Nieuwmarkt was halted for 3 days.

On Monday April 7, 2008 another train derailed in the same area, resulting in the halting of metro traffic on this section for 2 days. Metro service was resumed on Wednesday April 9 at 12:00.

== Gallery ==
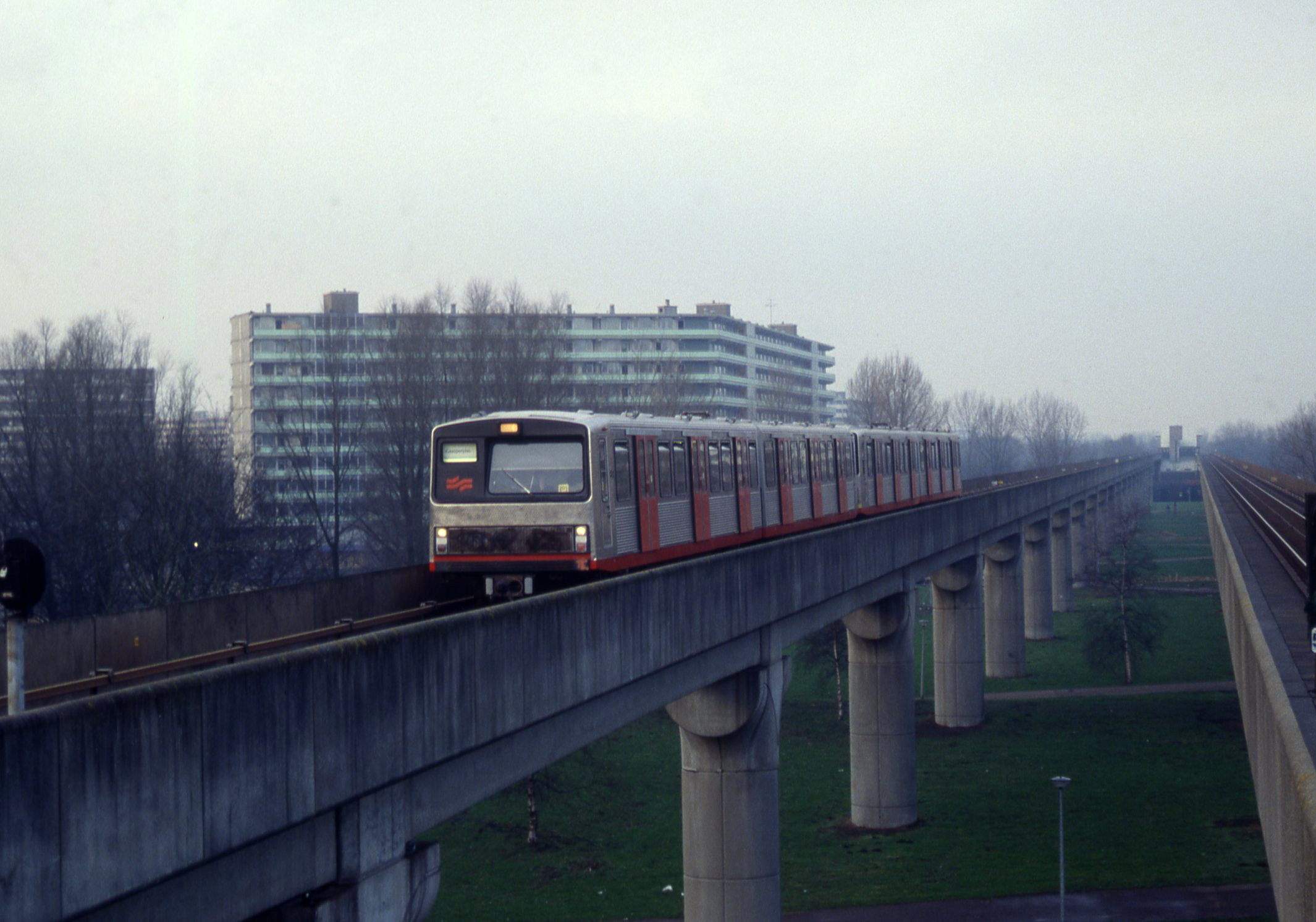
M3 train arriving at Kraaiennest station (1992)

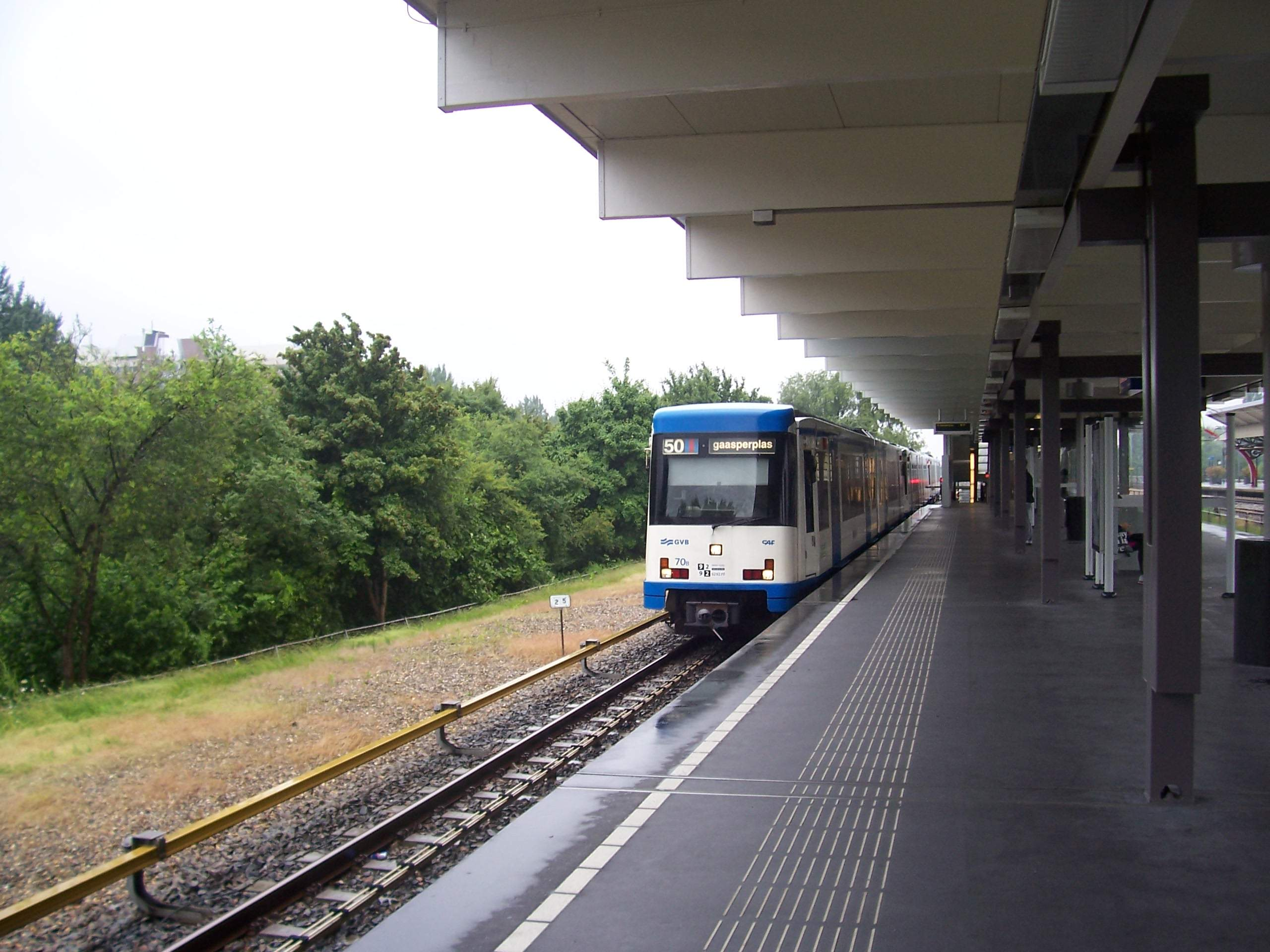
Line 50 at Diemen Zuid, operating with M4 rolling stock during Line 53 replacement service between Van der Madeweg and Gaasperplas (2013)

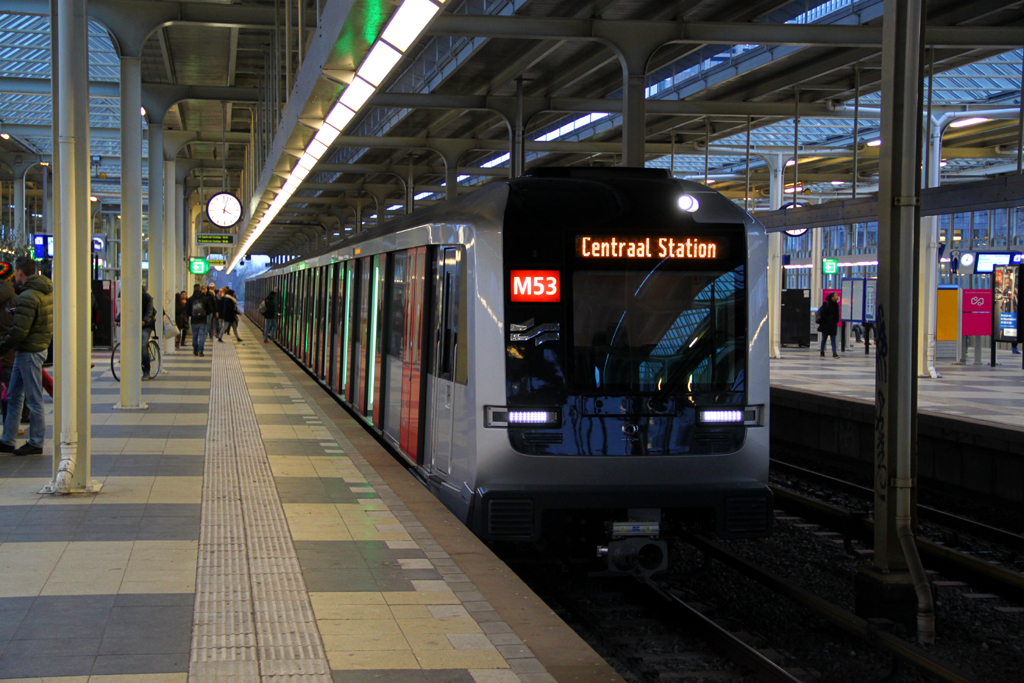
An M5 series train arriving at Amstel station

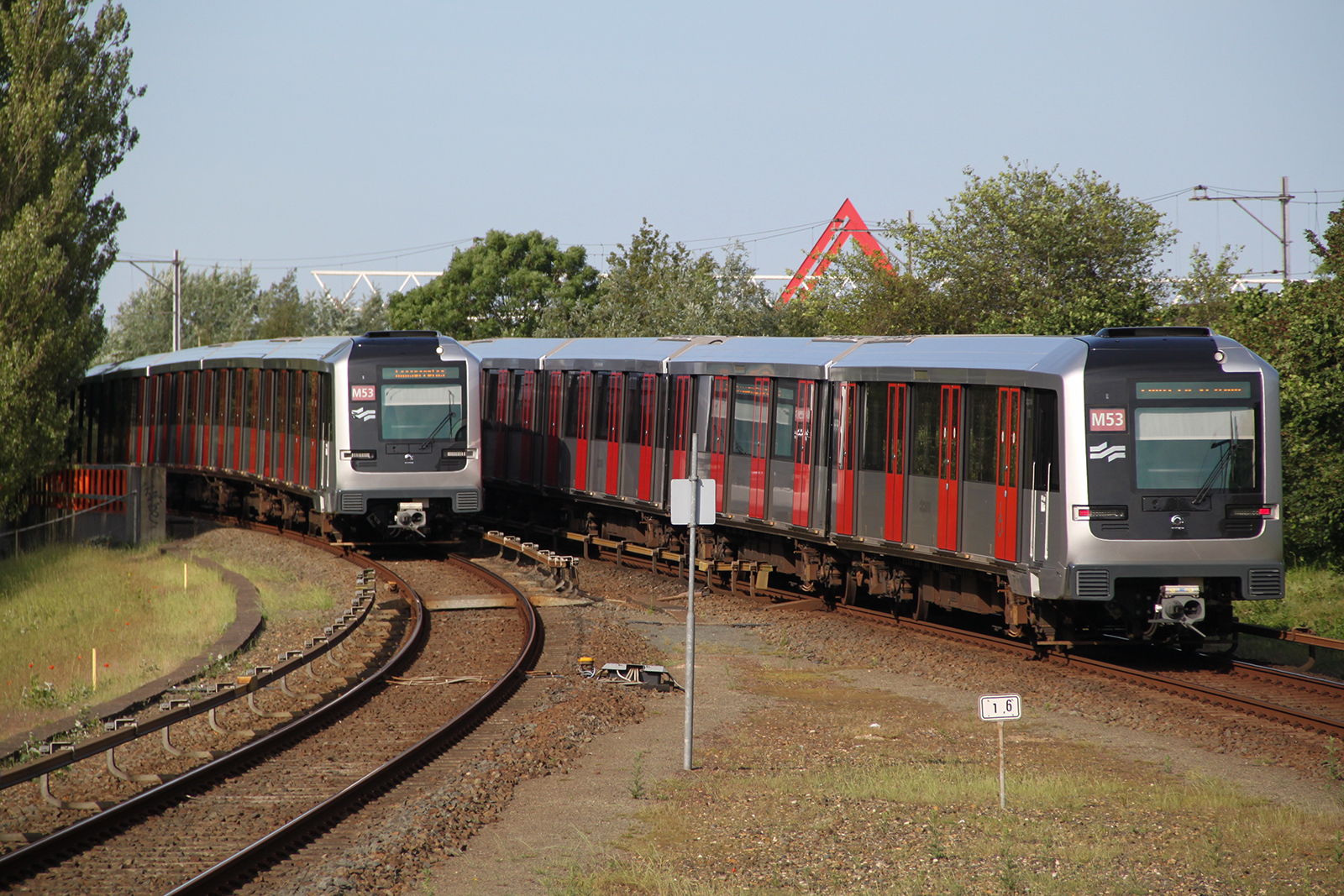
Two M5 series trains near Venserpolder station
