= Verrijn Stuartweg metro station =

Metro station in Amsterdam

Coordinates: 52°19′42″N 4°58′2″E

Verrijn Stuartweg
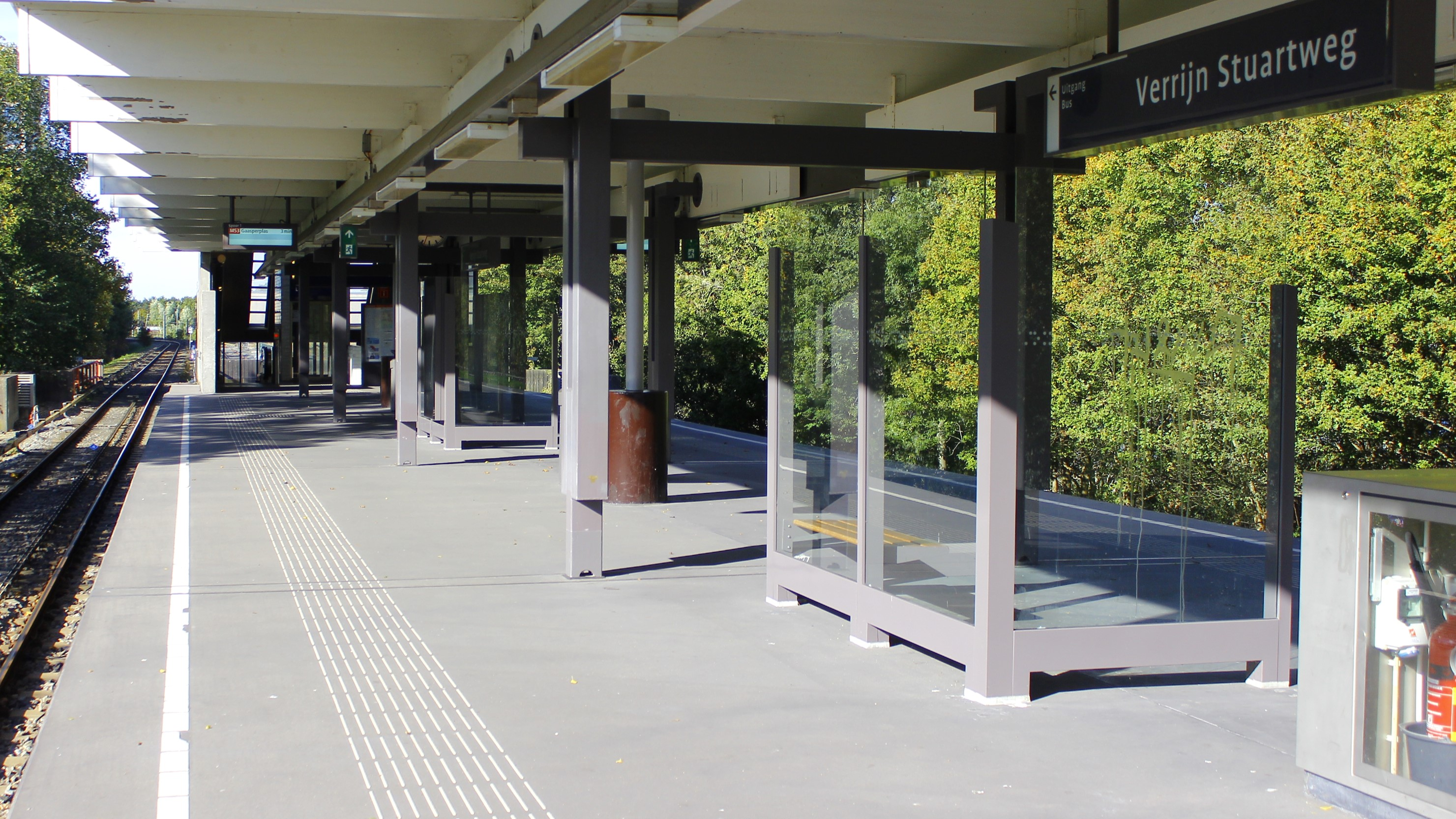

General information
- Owner: GVB
- Line: 53
- Platforms: 2

History
- Opened: 16 October 1977

Services
Preceding station	Amsterdam Metro	Following station
Station Diemen Zuid towards Centraal Station	Line 53	Ganzenhoef towards Gaasperplas
Location

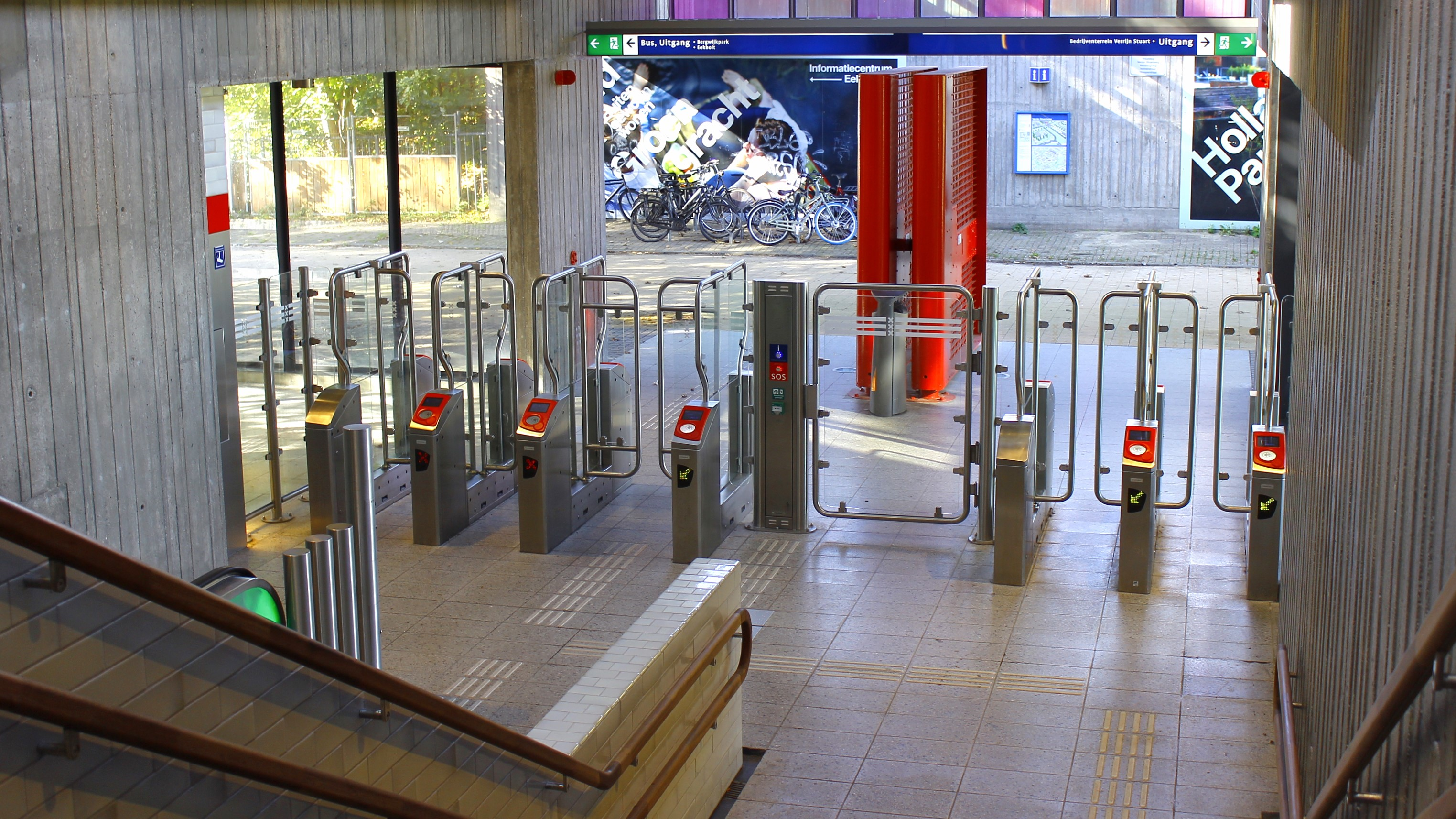
Station entrance

Verrijn Stuartweg is an Amsterdam Metro station in Diemen, Netherlands. It is located on the border of the industrial area and on the other side the former office district, now residential area, Bergwijkpark and Holland Park.
