= Diemen Zuid station =

Railway and metro station in Diemen, Netherlands

Diemen Zuid
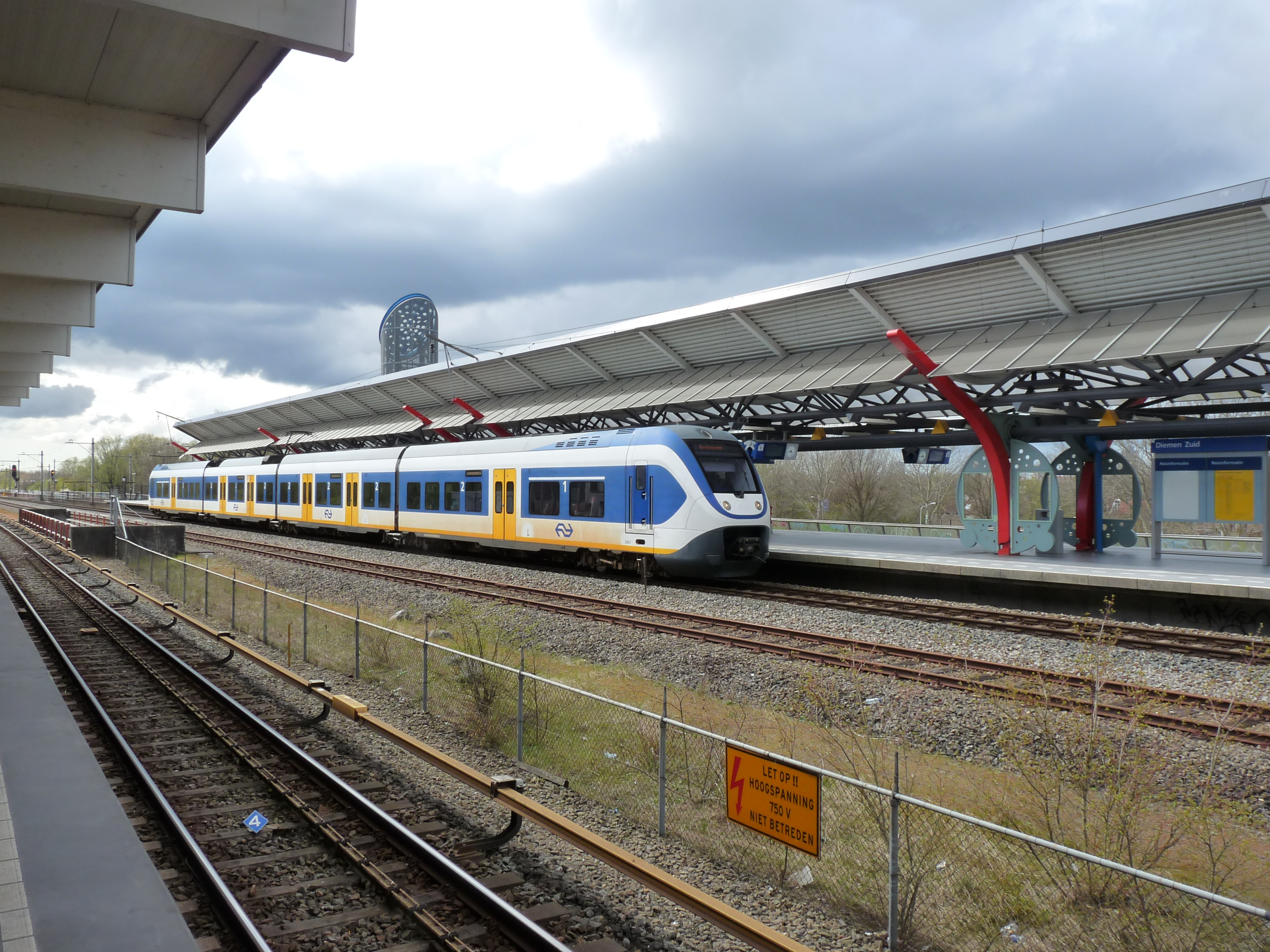
- Metro (left) and train (right) platforms of Diemen Zuid

General information
- Location: Diemen, Netherlands
- Coordinates: 52°19′49″N 4°57′23″E
- Line: Weesp–Leiden railway

Other information
- Station code: Dmnz

History
- Opened: 23 May 1993

Services
Preceding station	Nederlandse Spoorwegen	Following station
Duivendrecht towards Den Haag Centraal	NS Sprinter 4300	Weesp towards Lelystad Centrum
Duivendrecht towards Leiden Centraal	NS Sprinter 5700 Not after 20:30	Weesp towards Utrecht Centraal
Preceding station	Amsterdam Metro	Following station
Venserpolder towards Centraal Station	Line 53	Verrijn Stuartweg towards Gaasperplas
Location
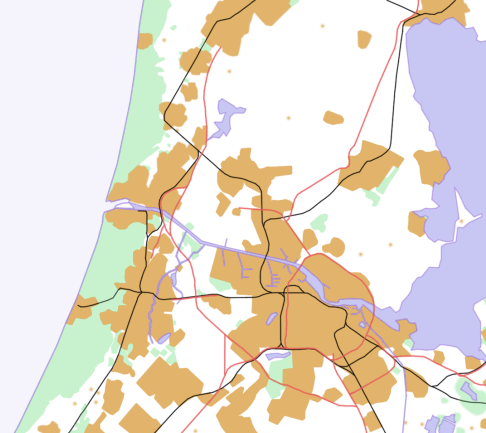
- Location within Northern Randstad Location within Netherlands

Diemen Zuid (Dutch pronunciation: [ˈdimə(n) ˈzœyt]; abbreviation: Dmnz) is a railway station is located in Diemen, a city to the southeast of Amsterdam. The railway station is served by Nederlandse Spoorwegen (NS) services as well as line 53 of the Amsterdam Metro.

The station was first used as only a metro station operated by GVB in 1977. This was one of the original metro lines in Amsterdam and is route 53 Centraal Station to Gaasperplas. In 1993, the Nederlandse Spoorwegen railway station opened at Diemen Zuid. This was as part of the Zuidelijke tak (South section) of the Ringspoorbaan in Amsterdam — this is the present-day line between Schiphol and Weesp.

== Services ==
=== Trains ===
As of 12 April 2022, the following train services call at this station:

- 4× per hour local Sprinter service Hoofddorp - Schiphol – Duivendrecht – Almere
- 4× per hour local Sprinter service Hoofddorp - Schiphol – Duivendrecht - Hilversum - Utrecht

=== Metros ===
The station is on the 53 metro line operated by GVB.

=== Buses ===
The bus lines are operated by GVB. Line 44 (Monday–Sunday) runs as a day service while line N87 runs as a nightsevice (Monday-Sunday).

- Line 44: Diemen Noord - Station Diemen - Diemen Centrum - Diemen Zuid - Bijlmermeer - Station Bijlmer ArenA
- Line N87: Centraal Station - Rembrandtplein - Artis - Watergraafsmeer - Station Diemen - Diemen Zuid - Ganzenhoef - Bijlmermeer - Station Bijlmer ArenA

== See also ==
- List of railway stations in Amsterdam
