= Spaklerweg metro station =

Amsterdam Metro station in the Netherlands

Spaklerweg
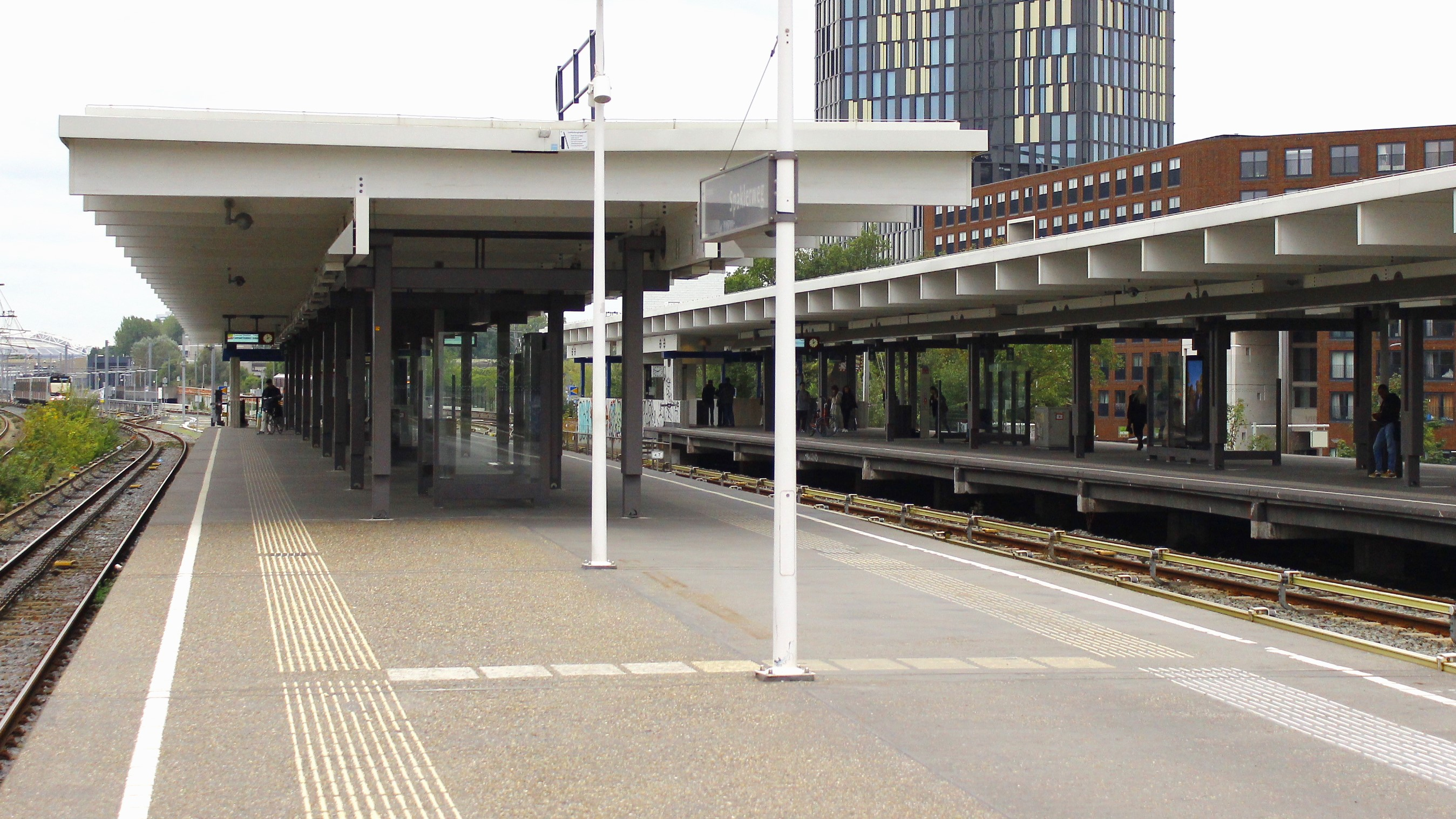

General information
- Location: Spaklerweg, Amsterdam; Netherlands
- Coordinates: 52°20′25″N 4°55′15″E
- Owner: GVB
- Platforms: 2 island platforms
- Tracks: 4

Construction
- Structure type: Elevated

Other information
- Fare zone: 5714 (Zuid)/ 5715 (Oost)

History
- Opened: 4 June 1982

Services
Preceding station	Amsterdam Metro	Following station
Station Amstel towards Centraal Station	Line 51	Overamstel towards Isolatorweg
Station Amstel towards Centraal Station	Line 53	Van der Madeweg towards Gaasperplas
Station Amstel towards Centraal Station	Line 54	Van der Madeweg towards Gein
Location

Spaklerweg is an Amsterdam Metro station in the industrial area Overamstel of Amsterdam, Netherlands. The station opened in 1982 and is served by 3 lines, the 51 (Amsterdam Centraal - Isolatorweg), 53 (Amsterdam Centraal - Gaasperplas) and 54 (Amsterdam Centraal - Gein).

The metro station is only accessible with an OV-chipkaart or GVB Travel Pass.

Change at this station between lines 51 and 53/54.

Amsterdam Metro network

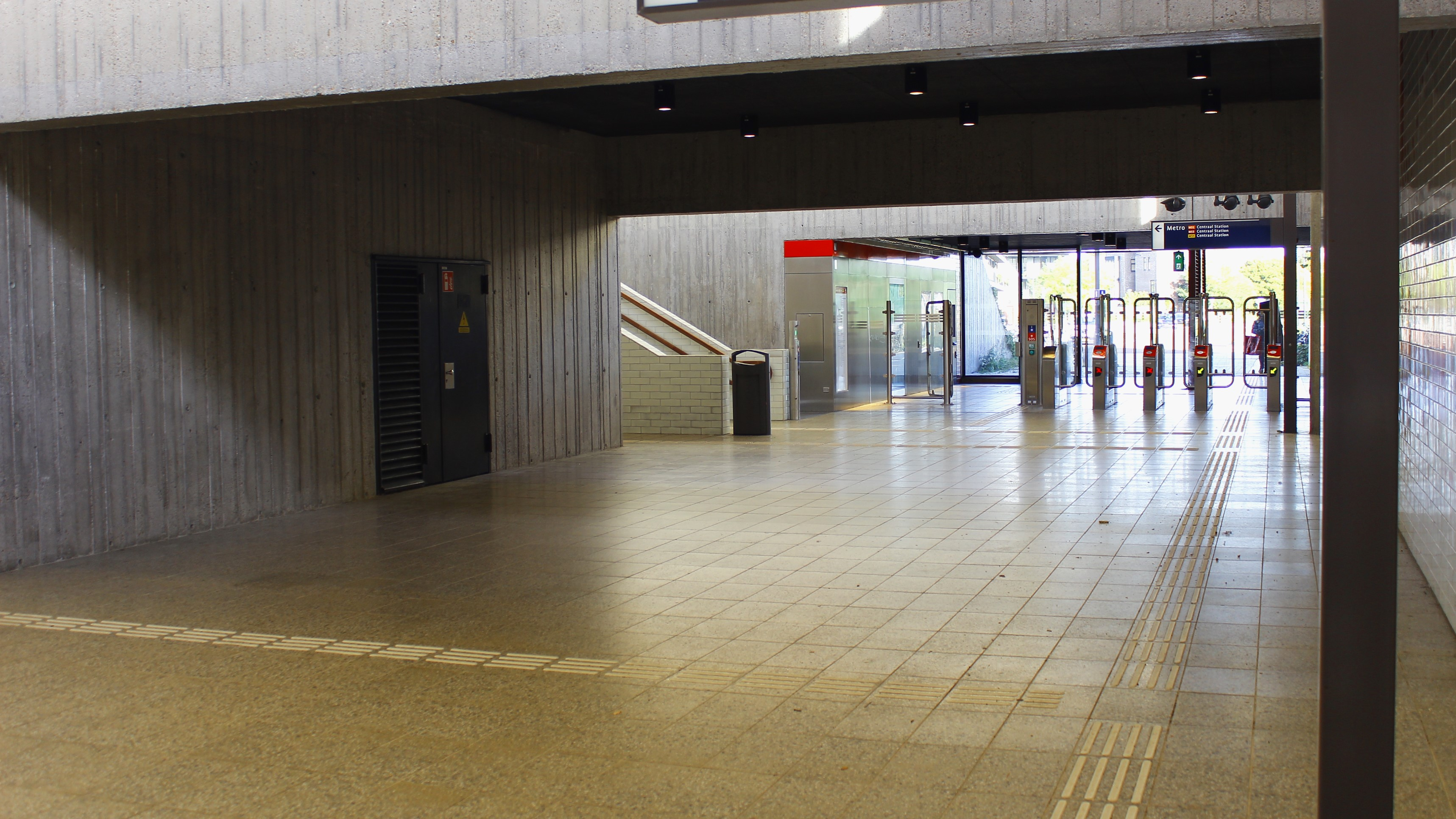
Station entrance
