= Rotterdam Delftsche Poort railway station =

Railway station in Rotterdam, the Netherlands

Coordinates: 51.9253°N 4.47361°E

Rotterdam Delftsche Poort
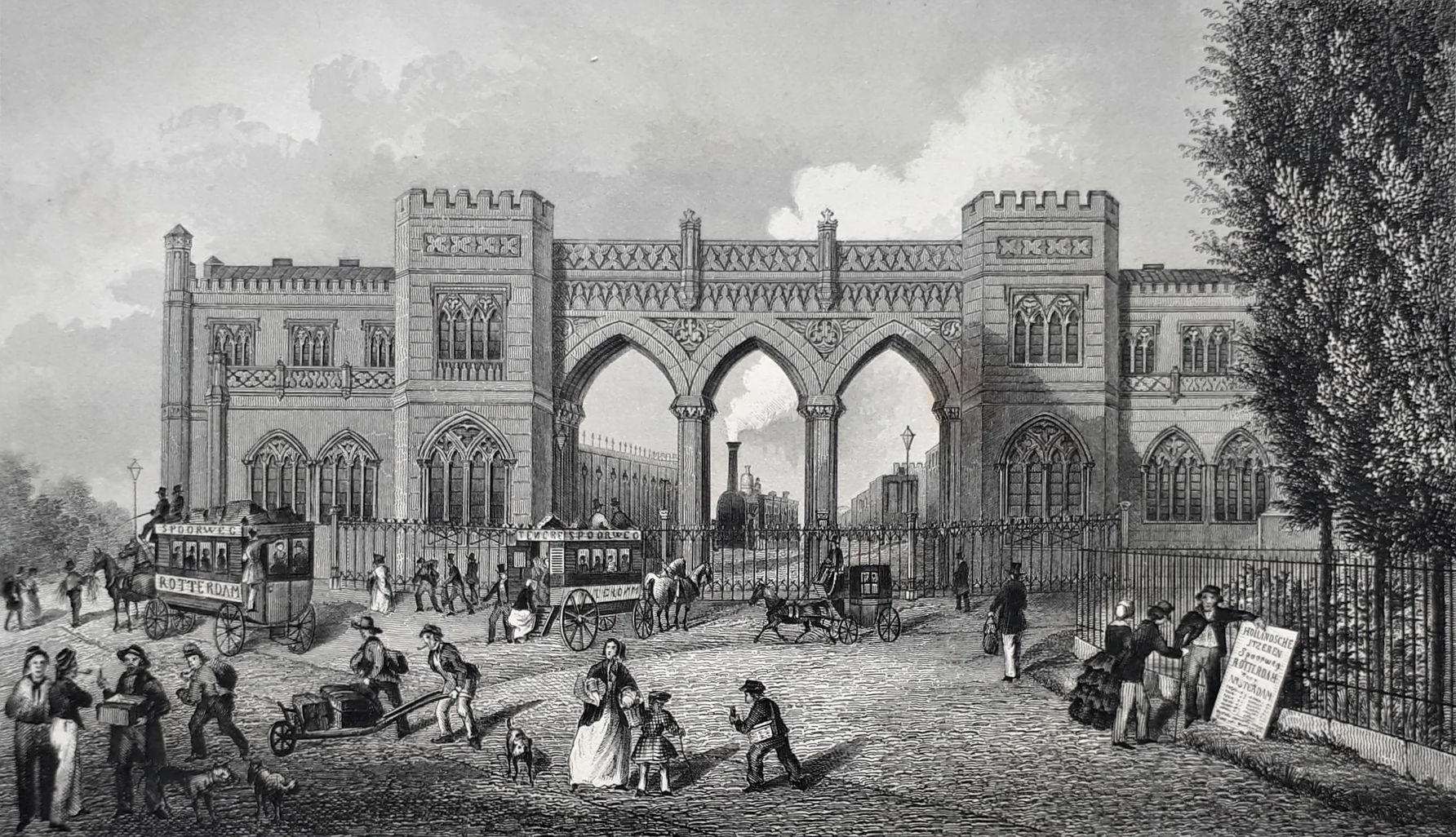
- The first Delftsche Poort railway station in 1858

General information
- Location: Netherlands

Other information
- Station code: Rtp

History
- Opened: 1847
- Closed: 1940
Location

Rotterdam Delftsche Poort was a railway station of the Hollandsche IJzeren Spoorweg-Maatschappij in Rotterdam, Netherlands located on the Oude Lijn from Amsterdam Willemspoort station to Rotterdam. The station was located east of the present-day Rotterdam Centraal.

== History ==
The first station Delftsche Poort opened in 1847 completing the railway line between Amsterdam and Rotterdam. The station was designed by Frederik Willem Conrad.

The second station Delftsche Poort opened in 1877 connection the Rotterdam with Dordrecht. This station was located slightly north-west to the former station.

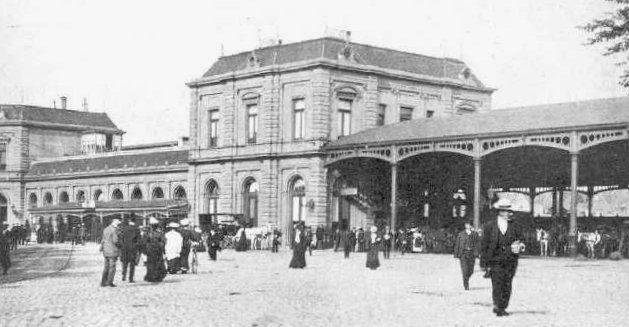
The second railway station Delftsche Poort in 1920

== See also ==
- Rotterdam Centraal railway station
