= 1926 Voorschoten train crash =

Rail accident in South Holland, Netherlands

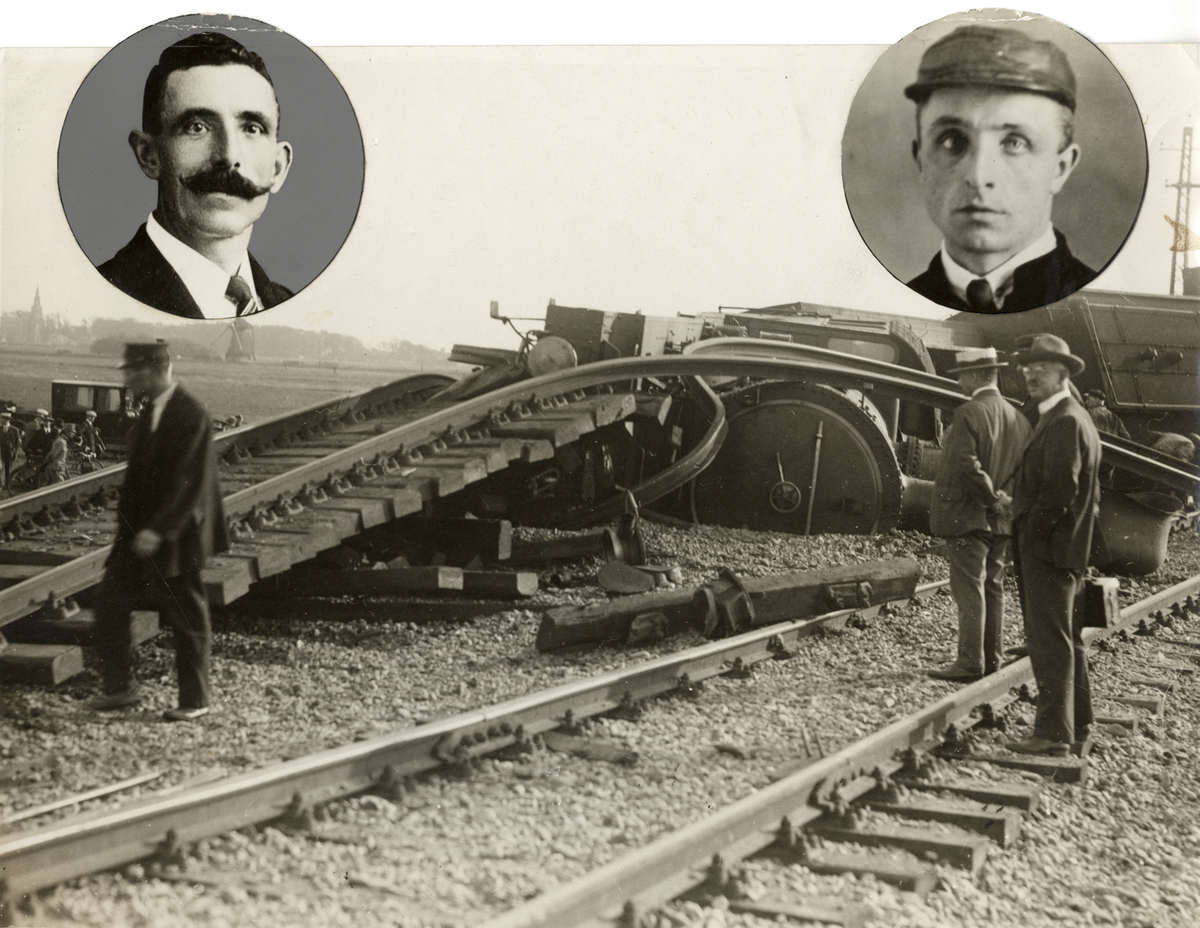
- The derailed train at Voorschoten. Inset: The two railway employees that were killed

- Voorschoten, Netherlands

Details
- Date: 9 September 1926
- Location: Voorschoten
- Coordinates: 52°08′45″N 4°27′28″E
- Country: Netherlands
- Line: Amsterdam–Haarlem–Rotterdam railway
- Operator: Nederlandse Spoorwegen
- Service: Rotterdam Delftsche Poort - Amsterdam Centraal
- Incident type: Derailment
- Cause: Track defect

Statistics
- Trains: 1
- Passengers: ~40
- Crew: 4
- Deaths: 4
- Injured: 10 (severe)

On 9 September 1926, a passenger train was derailed near Voorschoten, Netherlands due to defective track. Four people were killed and 30 were injured.

== Accident ==
On the afternoon of 9 September 1926, a passenger train from Rotterdam Delftsche Poort to Amsterdam Centraal was derailed near Voorschoten, Netherlands. The steam locomotive, baggage car and both carriages were derailed. The driver of the train survived the wreck; he used an axe to break into one of the carriages to assist those inside to escape. The guard of the train also survived.

The victims were two railway employees, and two of the passengers. Ten people were severely injured and many more suffered minor injuries.

== Aftermath ==
An international passenger train from Amsterdam to Paris, France, was held at Leiden Centraal, as the track was obstructed by debris. A farmer saw an opportunity to make some money from the crash, charging people 25¢ each to view the crash site at a distance of 20 metres (66 ft). He was criticized in the local newspapers for this. Explosives dispersed the derailed carriages following the accident. The locomotive was repaired, and had re-entered service by January 1927.

== Investigations ==
An investigation by the Dutch government revealed that a defective track was the cause of the derailment. An engineer and a supervisor were dismissed. An investigation by Nederlandse Spoorwegen could not reach a definitive conclusion as to the cause. They did not lay the blame on any individual.
