= Utrechtboog =

Railway line in the Netherlands

Coordinates: 52°19′14″N 4°56′03″E

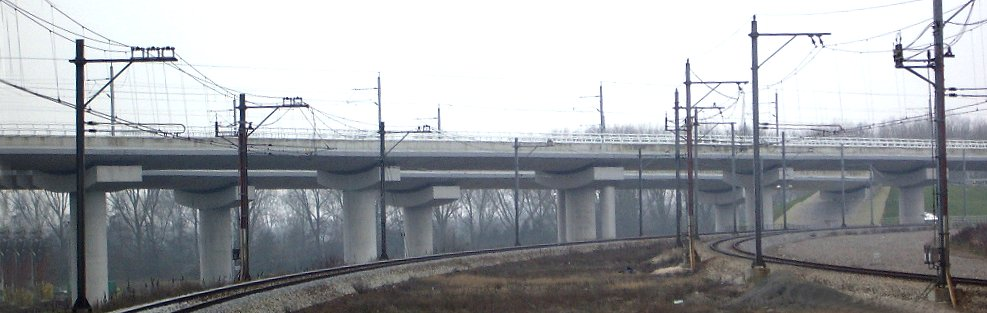
The Utrechtboog as seen from Duivendrecht railway station

The Utrechtboog is a flyover railway line in the south-east of Amsterdam, completed in March 2006, that directly connects Utrecht and Schiphol. After completion, it reduced journey times between the two by seven minutes. Prior to its construction, passengers travelling this route were required to change trains at Duivendrecht railway station.
