= Amsterdam Amstel station =

Railway station in Amsterdam

Amsterdam Amstel
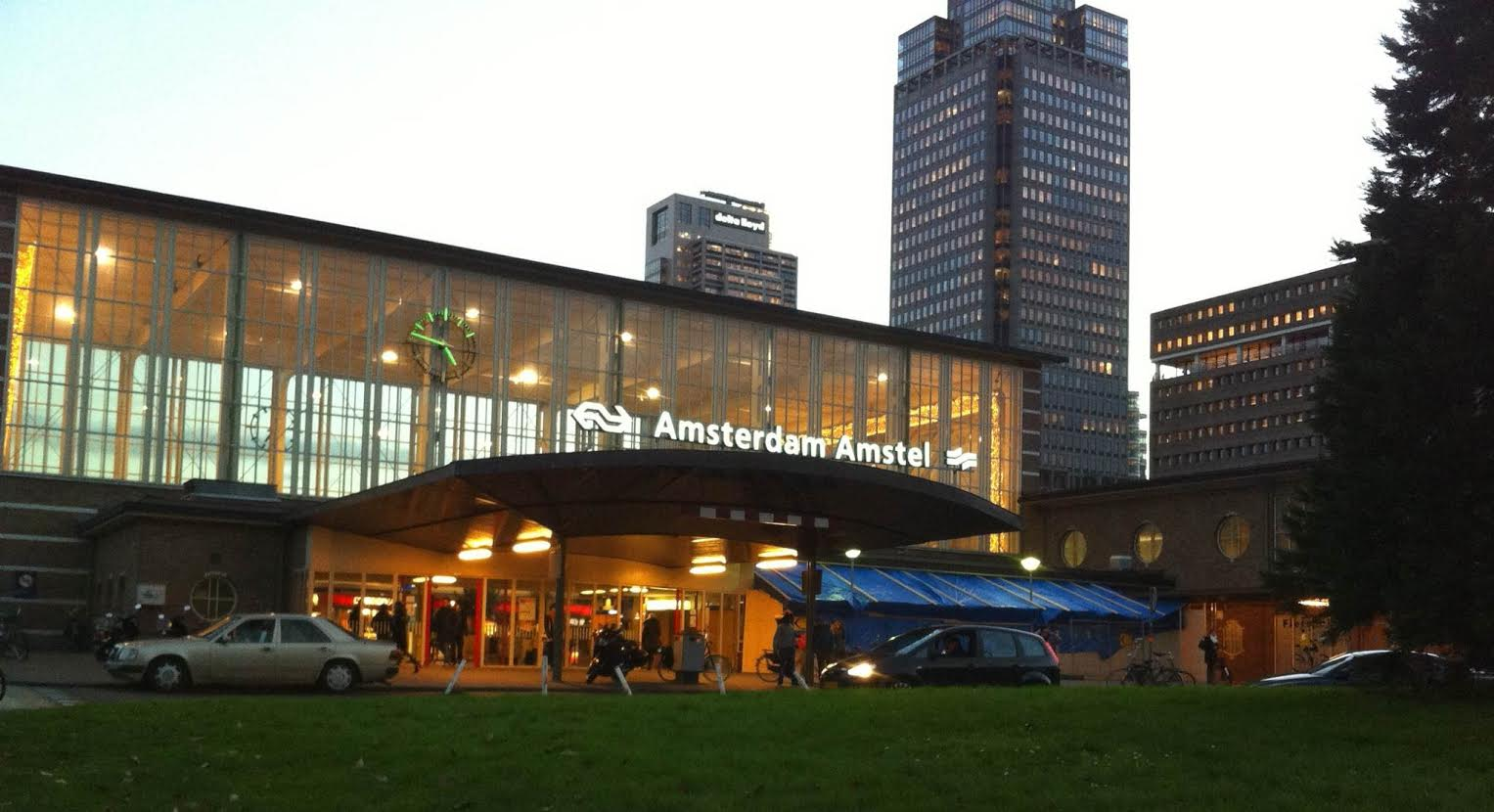
- Railway station's entrance in 2013

General information
- Location: Julianaplein 1 Amsterdam, Netherlands
- Coordinates: 52°20′47″N 4°55′4″E
- Operator: NS Stations
- Line: Amsterdam–Arnhem railway
- Platforms: 2 (train); 2 (metro)
- Train operators: Nederlandse Spoorwegen
- Bus operators: Gemeentelijk Vervoerbedrijf (local); Connexxion (regional)

Construction
- Architect: Hermanus Gerardus Jacob Schelling

Other information
- Station code: Asa

History
- Opened: 15 October 1939
Services
Preceding station	Nederlandse Spoorwegen	Following station
Amsterdam Centraal towards Alkmaar	NS Intercity 2700 Mon-Thur until 19:00	Utrecht Centraal towards Maastricht
Amsterdam Centraal towards Enkhuizen	NS Intercity 2900 After 19:00 and Fri-Sun only	Utrecht Centraal towards Maastricht
Amsterdam Centraal towards Den Helder	NS Intercity 3000	Utrecht Centraal towards Nijmegen
Amsterdam Centraal towards Enkhuizen	NS Intercity 3900 Mon-Thur until 19:30	Utrecht Centraal towards Heerlen
Amsterdam Muiderpoort towards Uitgeest	NS Sprinter 4000	Duivendrecht towards Rotterdam Centraal
Amsterdam Muiderpoort towards Uitgeest	NS Sprinter 7400 Peak hours only	Duivendrecht towards Driebergen-Zeist
Preceding station	Amsterdam Metro	Following station
Wibautstraat towards Centraal Station	Line 51	Spaklerweg towards Isolatorweg
Wibautstraat towards Centraal Station	Line 53	Spaklerweg towards Gaasperplas
Wibautstraat towards Centraal Station	Line 54	Spaklerweg towards Gein
Preceding station	Amsterdam Tram	Following station
Amsteldijk towards Centraal Station	Line 12	Terminus
Location
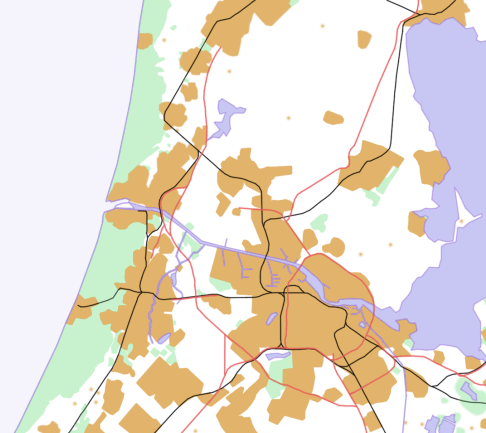
- Location within Northern Randstad Location within Netherlands

Amsterdam Amstel (Dutch pronunciation: [ˌɑmstərˈdɑm ˈɑmstəl]; abbreviation: Asa) is a railway station in Amsterdam, Netherlands. The station opened in 1939. It is located to the southeast of Amsterdam Centraal in the borough of Amsterdam-Oost, near the Amstel river. Amsterdam Amstel is used daily by 26,000 train and metro passengers. Rail services at the station are provided by NS, the principal railway operator in the Netherlands. Metro, tram and city bus services are provided by municipal operator GVB. Regional buses are operated by Transdev and Keolis.

Amstel station is situated in the Omval business district which includes the Rembrandt Tower, the tallest skyscraper in the city, and the Leeuwenburg campus of the Hogeschool van Amsterdam.

== History ==
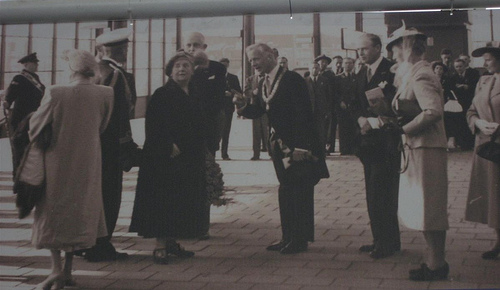
Opening by Queen Wilhelmina (1939)

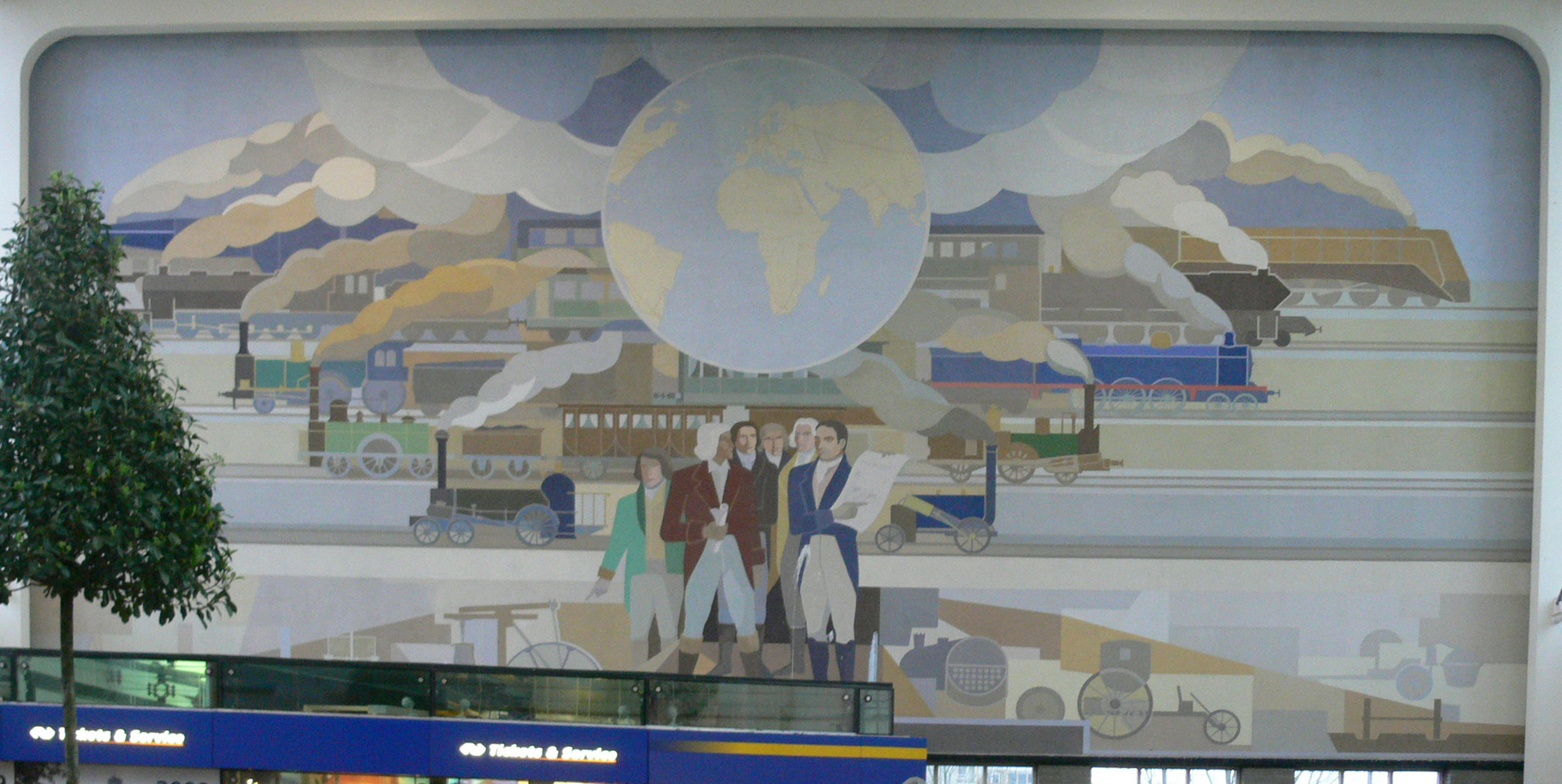
Mural by Peter Alma (1939)

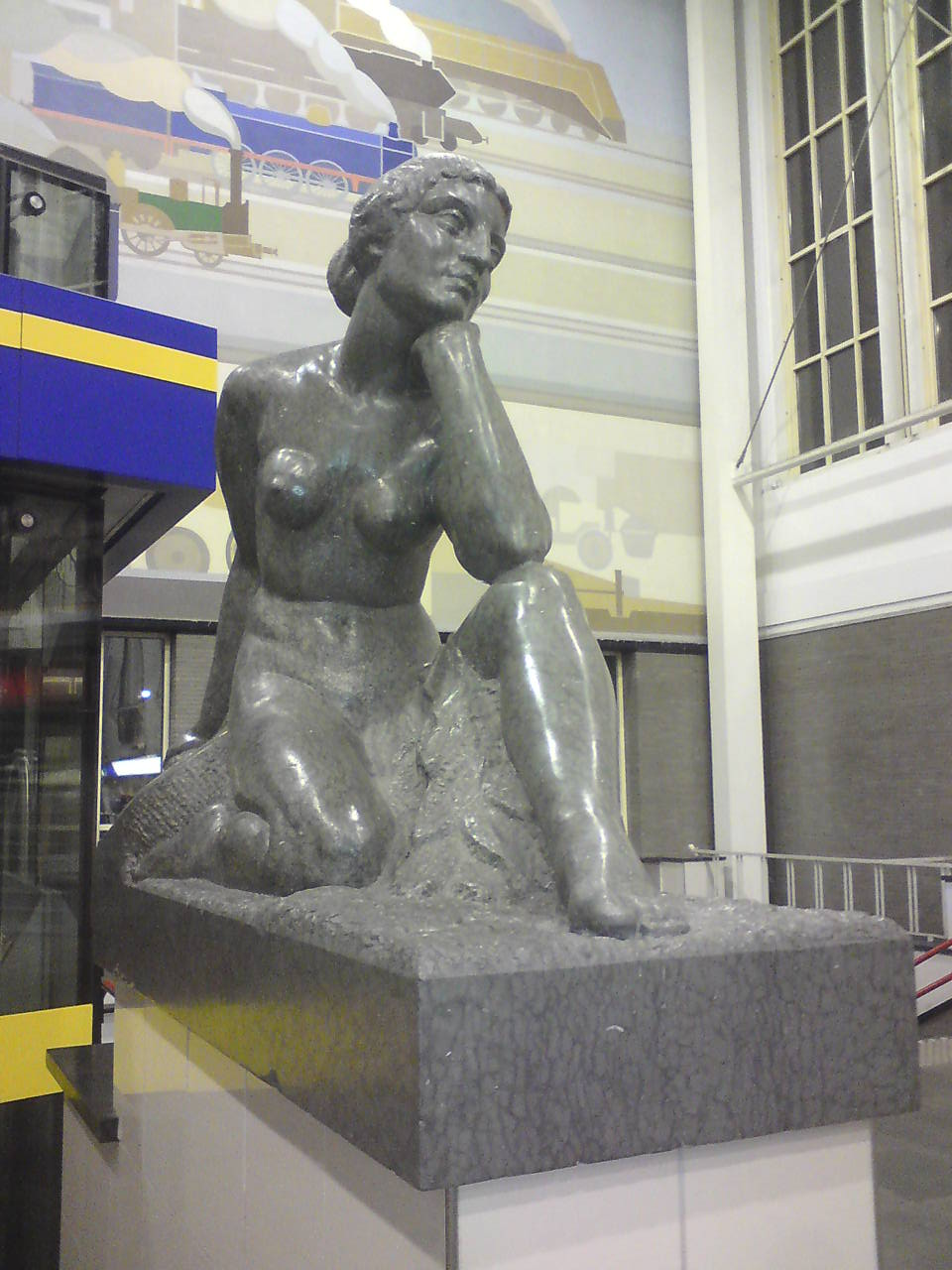
Sculpture Terugblik (Retrospect, 1939) by Theo van Reijn

The station was built under the direction of architects H.G.J. Schelling of NS, the principal railway operator in the Netherlands, and John Leupen of the City of Amsterdam. The railway station was opened on 15 October 1939, by Queen Wilhelmina of the Netherlands. It is part of the Spoorwegwerken Oost (Eastern Railway Works), in which the railway lines between the Amsterdam Centraal and Amstel were placed on embankments and streets were bridged with viaducts. By eliminating the many level crossings in this part of the city, the project made an end to the many delays on these lines. Amstel replaced the Weesperpoortstation (1843), the terminus station on the Amsterdam–Arnhem railway which was situated near the present-day Weesperplein metro station. By replacing this terminus station, trains between Utrecht Centraal and Amsterdam Centraal no longer needed to reverse when leaving the station, leading to additional time savings on this route. As Amstel station is situated southeast of the former Weesperpoortstation, it has become a major transport hub for the eastern and southern boroughs of Amsterdam. In 1977, when the Amsterdam Metro was opened, Amstel station also became a metro station.

The station hall has been decorated with several murals (1939) created by Dutch artist Peter Alma (1868-1969). The murals reflect the importance of technological advancement, in particular of the railroads. Images of the murals are also used on the window film decorating the outer windows of the platform roof. The station hall also features a 1958 ceramic tile panel, also designed by Peter Alma and manufactured by H. Rijneveld. Until 2003, it was placed in the former Marnixbad swimming pool. Both outside and inside the building are two sculptures (1939) by Theo van Reijn, which are called 'Terugblik and Toekomst der Spoorwegen' (Translated: 'Retrospect and Future of the Railways") together. In 1977, at the opening of the metro station, an artwork by Rudi van de Wint entitled Ruimtediagonaal ('Space Diagonal') was placed in the station hall. The work featured a tube hanging diagonally from the ceiling. This artwork has since been removed. In 2006, the engineering building at the southern end of track 4 was decorated with a number of panels designed by Serge Verheugen.

In 2001, the station underwent major renovation works, which included an expansion of the number of shops and food outlets in the station hall.

== Station layout ==
The station has two island platforms and four tracks. Tracks 1 and 4 are used for rail services. The two middle tracks, numbers 2 and 3, are in use by the Amsterdam metro since 1977, allowing for cross-platform transfers between train and metro. Originally, Amstel station was a terminus station for car-sleeper trains. Therefore, the western island platform had a ramp allowing cars to access the platform. With the arrival of the metro in the 1970s, the car-sleeper service moved to 's-Hertogenbosch.

The platforms at Amstel station are closed off by ticket barriers, only accessible with an OV-chipkaart smart card, with separate access points for NS train and GVB metro services. The NS ticket barriers, however, remain opened permanently until the OV-chipkaart system is fully implemented in the rail network. The tunnel underneath the station has been designated a joint NS and GVB OV-chipkaart area. Passengers transferring between trains and metros can use each operator's card readers on the platforms to check in and check out.

== Services ==
=== Trains ===
As of 10 December 2017, the following train services call at this station:

- Express
  - Intercity: (Schagen–)Alkmaar–Amsterdam–Utrecht–Eindhoven–Maastricht
  - Intercity: Den Helder–Amsterdam–Utrecht–Arnhem–Nijmegen
  - Intercity: Enkhuizen–Amsterdam–Utrecht–Eindhoven–Heerlen
  - Intercity: Enkhuizen–Amsterdam–Utrecht–Eindhoven–Maastricht
- Local
  - Sprinter: Uitgeest–Amsterdam–Breukelen–Woerden–Rotterdam
  - Sprinter: Amsterdam–Utrecht–Rhenen

=== Metros ===
Amsterdam Metro routes 51, 53 and 54 call at Amsterdam Amstel (called Amstelstation on the metro system).

- 51 Central Station - Amstel - Overamstel - RAI - Zuid - Lelylaan - Sloterdijk - Isolatorweg
- 53 Central Station - Amstel - Van der Madeweg - Diemen-Zuid - Bijlmer East - Gaasperplas
- 54 Central Station - Amstel - Van der Madeweg - Duivendrecht - Bijlmer ArenA - Holendrecht - Gein

=== Trams ===
GVB operates one tram service from Amstel:

- 12 Amsterdam Amstel - De Pijp - Museumplein - Leidseplein - Dam - Central Station

=== Buses ===
==== City buses ====
These services are operated by GVB.

- 37 Station Amstel - Muiderpoort - Flevopark - Zuiderzeeweg - Nieuwendam - Buiksloot - Station Noord
- 40 Station Amstel - Watergraafsmeer - Science Park - Muiderpoort
- 62 Station Amstel - RAI - Buitenveldert - VU - Olympisch Stadion - Haarlemmermeerstation - Hoofddorpplein - Slotervaart - Station Lelylaan
- 65 Station Zuid - Rivierenbuurt - Station Amstel - Watergraafsmeer - KNSM Island

==== Regional buses ====
These services are operated by Transdev and Keolis, as part of the R-net network.

- 320 Amsterdam Amstel - Muiden P&R - Gooimeer P&R Blaricum Hospital - Huizen - Blaricum P&R - Hilversum Station
- 322 Amsterdam Amstel - Muiden P&R - Almere Poort - Gooisekant - Almere Parkwijk
- 327 Amsterdam Amstel - Muiden P&R - Almere 't Oor Bus Station - Almere Haven
