= Duivendrecht station =

Railway station in Duivendrecht, Netherlands

Duivendrecht
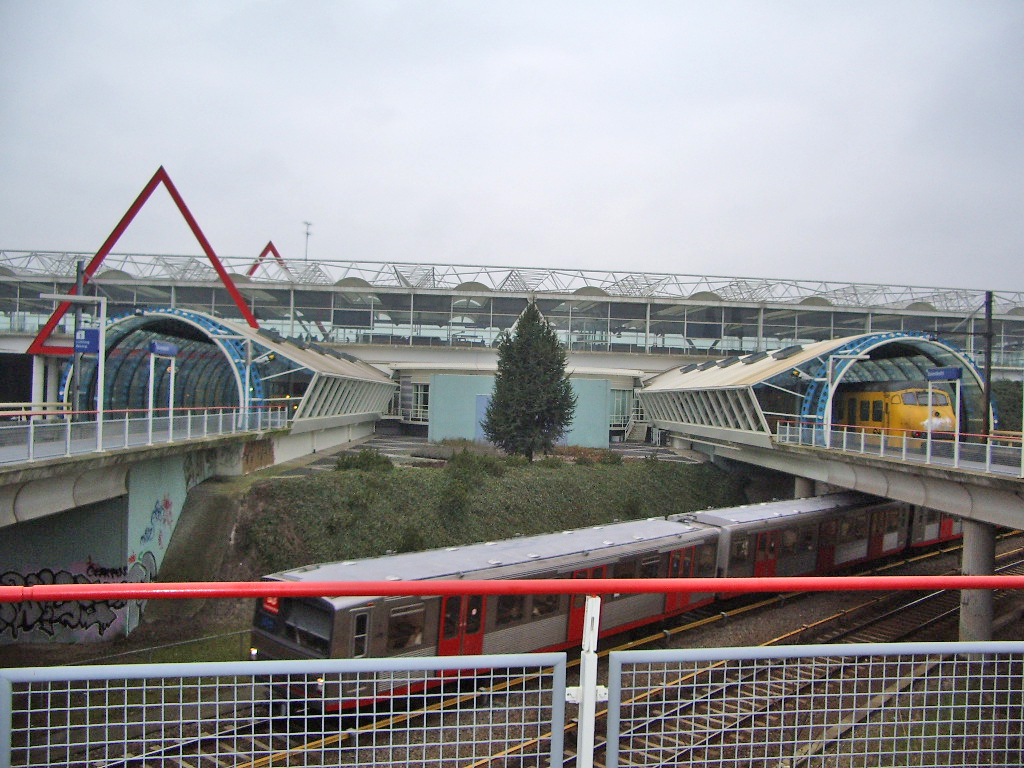

General information
- Location: Netherlands
- Coordinates: 52°19′24″N 4°56′11″E
- Operator: Nederlandse Spoorwegen
- Lines: Amsterdam–Arnhem railway Weesp–Leiden railway

Other information
- Station code: Dvd

History
- Opened: 23 May 1993
Services
Preceding station	NS International	Following station
Amsterdam Zuid towards Brussels-South	Eurocity Direct 9500 Mon-Sat before 20:00	Almere Centrum towards Lelystad Centrum
Preceding station	Nederlandse Spoorwegen	Following station
Amsterdam Zuid towards Breda	NS Intercity Direct 1800	Hilversum towards Amersfoort Schothorst
Amsterdam Zuid towards Rotterdam Centraal	NS Intercity Direct 2400 Mon-Sat until 20:00	Almere Centrum towards Lelystad Centrum
Amsterdam Amstel towards Uitgeest	NS Sprinter 4000	Amsterdam Bijlmer ArenA towards Rotterdam Centraal
Amsterdam RAI towards Den Haag Centraal	NS Sprinter 4300	Diemen Zuid towards Lelystad Centrum
Amsterdam RAI towards Leiden Centraal	NS Sprinter 5700 Not after 20:30	Diemen Zuid towards Utrecht Centraal
Amsterdam Amstel towards Uitgeest	NS Sprinter 7400 Peak hours only	Amsterdam Bijlmer ArenA towards Driebergen-Zeist
Preceding station	Amsterdam Metro	Following station
Van der Madeweg towards Isolatorweg	Line 50	Strandvliet towards Gein
Van der Madeweg towards Centraal Station	Line 54	Strandvliet towards Gein
Location
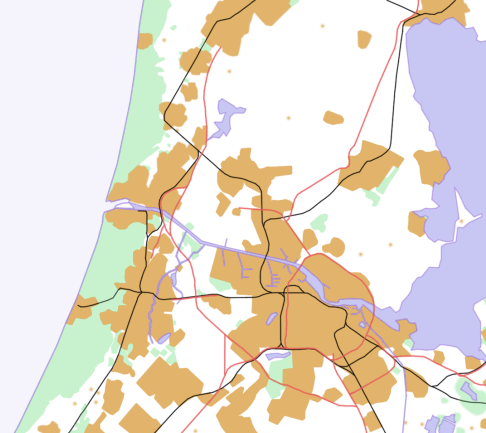
- Location within Northern Randstad Location within Netherlands

Duivendrecht station (DVD) is a combined rail and metro station in Duivendrecht, Netherlands. The station opened on 23 May 1993 as part of the extension of the Zuidtak of the Amsterdam Ringspoorbaan, between Amsterdam RAI and Weesp. This station allows for the interchange between two grade-separated railways:

- the Amsterdam–Arnhem railway on the upper floor, consisting of two island platforms with the outer sides serving heavy rail and the inner sides serving the Amsterdam Metro, which runs in between the tracks of the main railway.
- the Weesp–Leiden railway on the lower floor, consisting of one broad island platform which also houses the station hall.

Duivendrecht is largely an interchange station: the village itself is quite small. However, the Duivendrecht railway station is near the Amsterdam ArenA and the Amsterdam Bijlmer ArenA railway station. Since December 2006, fewer trains call at Duivendrecht because passenger trains heading from Utrecht towards Schiphol v.v. nowadays use the Utrechtboog.

== Services ==
=== Train ===
As of 3 July 2018, the following train services call at this station:

- Lower floor
  - 2× per hour Intercity service Lelystad - Almere - Duivendrecht - Amsterdam Zuid - Schiphol Airport - Leiden - The hague - Delft - Rotterdam - Dordrecht
  - 2× per hour Intercity service Schiphol - Amsterdam Zuid - Duivendrecht - Hilversum - Amersfoort Schothorst
  - 2× per hour local Sprinter service Hoofddorp - Schiphol Airport - Duivendrecht - Weesp - Almere Oostvaarders
  - 2× per hour local Sprinter service Hoofddorp - Schiphol Airport - Duivendrecht - Weesp - Hilversum - Utrecht
- Upper floor
  - 2× per hour local Sprinter service Uitgeest - Amsterdam - Breukelen - Woerden - Rotterdam
  - 2× per hour local Sprinter service Uitgeest - Amsterdam - Breukelen - Utrecht - Rhenen

=== Metro ===
- M50: Gein - Holendrecht - Amsterdam bijlmer ArenA - Duivendrecht - Amsterdam Rai - Amsterdam Zuid - Amsterdam Lelylaan - Amsterdam Sloterdijk - Isolatorweg
- M54: Gein - Holendrecht - Amsterdam bijlmer ArenA - Duivendrecht - Amsterdam Amstel - Amsterdam Central station

=== Bus ===
Bus Service	Operator	From	To	Via	Notes
41	GVB	Station Muiderpoort	Station Holendrecht/AMC	Station Muiderpoort, Duivendrecht (village), Station Duivendrecht, Ganzenhoef, Kraaiennest, Holendrecht	
