= Amsterdam RAI station =

Railway station in Amsterdam, Netherlands

Amsterdam RAI
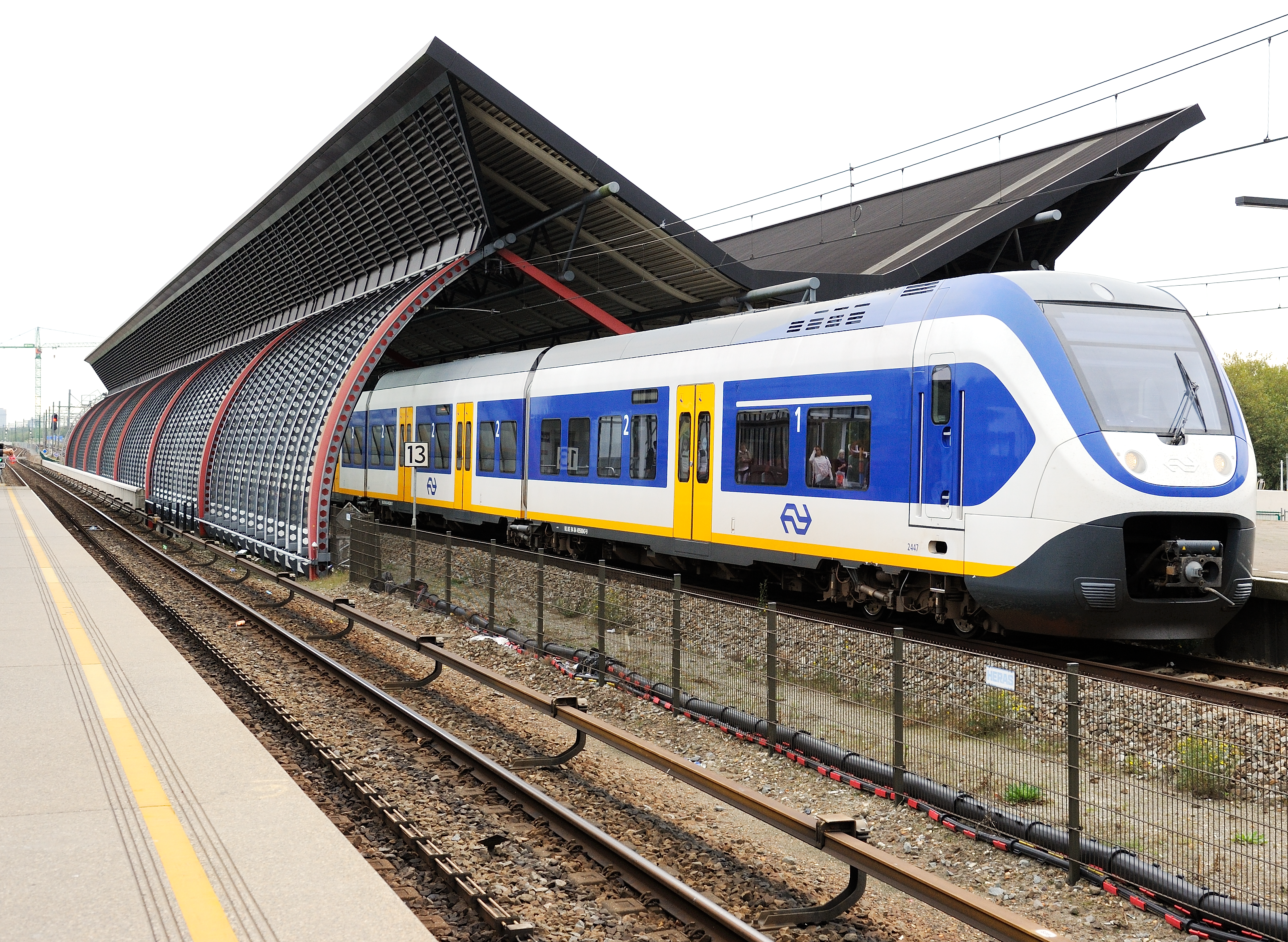

General information
- Location: Netherlands
- Coordinates: 52°20′12″N 4°53′26″E

Other information
- Station code: Rai

History
- Opened: 31 May 1981; 45 years ago

Services
| Preceding station | Nederlandse Spoorwegen | Following station |
|---|---|---|
| Amsterdam Zuid towards Den Haag Centraal | NS Sprinter 4300 | Duivendrecht towards Lelystad Centrum |
| Amsterdam Zuid towards Leiden Centraal | NS Sprinter 5700 Not after 20:30 | Duivendrecht towards Utrecht Centraal |
| Preceding station | Amsterdam Metro | Following station |
| Station Zuid towards Isolatorweg | Line 50 | Overamstel towards Gein |
| Station Zuid towards Isolatorweg | Line 51 | Overamstel towards Centraal Station |
| Preceding station | Amsterdam Tram | Following station |
| Europaplein towards Centraal Station | Line 4 | Drentepark Terminus |
Location
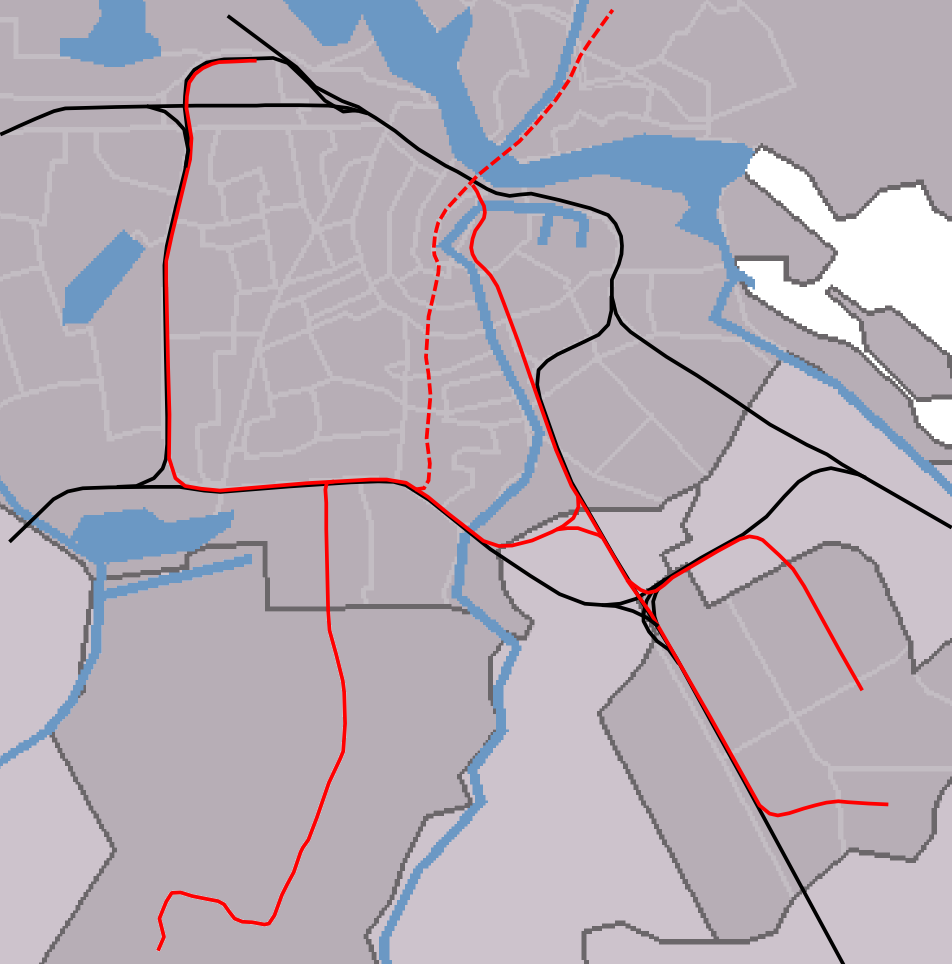
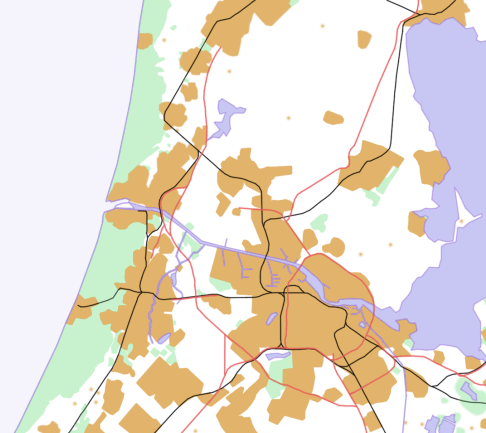
- Location within metro van Amsterdam Location within Northern Randstad Location within Netherlands

Amsterdam RAI is a railway station situated in southern Amsterdam, Netherlands. It is located between the two directions of the A10 Amsterdam ring road. It is also a metro station at which GVB runs two lines. The station takes its name from the nearby convention center RAI Amsterdam.

== History ==
The original station opened in 1981 when it was a terminus station, with just one platform and the station had no signals. It was then possible to walk straight onto the GVB tramway line 4 (with Amsterdam Central Station as terminus) without changing platforms.

In 1988 the tram terminus moved to street level below the station. This was due to the building of Amsterdam Metro line 51 next to the railway station. This line began operating in 1990. The roof of the railway station was built in 1997. The new station was built in 1991 and Amsterdam RAI became an island platform station and then in 1993 the line was extended towards Weesp.

The design of the station is by architect Rob Steenhuis.

In 2012, an expansion of the station from 2 to 4 tracks was commenced. These works were completed in August 2016.

The station is named after the Amsterdam RAI Exhibition and Convention Centre building.

== Service ==
=== Train ===
As of 11 December 2016, the following train services call at this station:

- 2× per hour local Sprinter service Hoofddorp - Schiphol - Duivendrecht - Weesp - Almere
- 2× per hour local Sprinter service Hoofddorp - Schiphol - Duivendrecht - Weesp - Hilversum - Utrecht

During some conferences at the RAI, Intercity services stop here too.

=== Metro ===
GVB operates all Amsterdam city services and Metro lines 50 and 51 stop at Amsterdam RAI metro station which runs parallel with the NS railway.

- 50 Isolatorweg - Sloterdijk - Lelylaan - Zuid - RAI - Duivendrecht - Bijlmer ArenA - Holendrecht - Gein
- 51 Centraal Station - Amstel - RAI - Zuid - Lelylaan - Sloterdijk - Isolatorweg

=== Tram ===
GVB operates one tram service to Amsterdam RAI.

- 4 Central Station - Rembrandtplein - Utrechtsestraat - Ceintuurbaan - RAI

=== Bus ===
This service is operated by GVB.

- 62 Station Lelylaan - Slotervaart - Hoofddorpplein - Haarlemmermeerstation - Olympisch Stadion - VU - Buitenveldert - RAI - Station Amstel

This service is operated by Transdev

- 321 Huizen - Muiden - Amsterdam RAI - Amsterdam Zuid/VU
