= GVB (Amsterdam) =

Public transport company in Amsterdam

Gemeente Vervoerbedrijf Amsterdam

Overview
- Owner: Government of Amsterdam
- Area served: Metropolitan Region Amsterdam
- Locale: Amsterdam, Netherlands
- Transit type: Tram, metro, ferry and bus
- Annual ridership: 273.8 million
- Website: www.gvb.nl

Operation
- Began operation: 1900

Technical
- Track gauge: 1,435 mm (4 ft 8 1/2 in) standard gauge
- Electrification: 600–750 V DC

GVB is the municipal public transport operator for Amsterdam, the Netherlands, operating metro, tram, bus and ferry services in the metropolitan area of Amsterdam.

== History ==
Amsterdam Metro Network

Amsterdam Tram Network

The forerunner of the GVB, the Gemeentetram Amsterdam (GTA) (Amsterdam Municipal Tramway), was established on 1 January 1900 by the city after it acquired a number of private companies. The first electric tram ran on 14 August 1900. In 1925, the GTA introduced its first bus line. In 1943, Gemeentetram merged with Gemeenteveren Amsterdam (established in 1897), the municipal ferry company, to form Gemeente Vervoerbedrijf (Note: Sometimes also written Gemeentevervoerbedrijf.) Amsterdam (Dutch pronunciation: [ɣəˈmeːntə vɛrˈvuːrbədrɛif ˌɑmstərˈdɑm]; lit. 'Amsterdam Municipality Transportation Company'). In 1977, the first metro line was introduced.

By 2002, the organization was simply called GVB. In 2007, the GVB became a public limited company under the name GVB Activa B.V., wholly owned by the City of Amsterdam; previously, the GVB was part of the City Of Amsterdam. Between 2006 and 2016, Stadsregio Amsterdam was the authority responsible for all public transport in the greater Amsterdam area; it granted a concession to the GVB to provide public transport services. In 2010, Stadsregio Amsterdam extended the concession of the GVB for the period 2012–2017, and at the end of 2013, further extended it until 2024. On 1 January 2017, Vervoerregio Amsterdam replaced Stadsregio Amsterdam as the public transport authority for the greater Amsterdam area. In 2025 the concession was extended until 2036.

== Network ==
The GVB operates a number of public transportation networks in and around the city of Amsterdam, including:

- 5 metro lines, partly elevated, no level crossings.
- 14 tram routes, on street, partly mixed with all other traffic, partly on lanes shared with buses and taxis, and partly on separate lanes.
- 46 bus routes; buses often mix with other traffic, but sometimes on lanes shared with trams and taxis, or for buses only.
- 10 ferry routes across the IJ; at least one is frequent, operating 24 hours a day, free of charge.

The newest metro line is the North/South line, which was opened on 22 July 2018.

== Metro ==
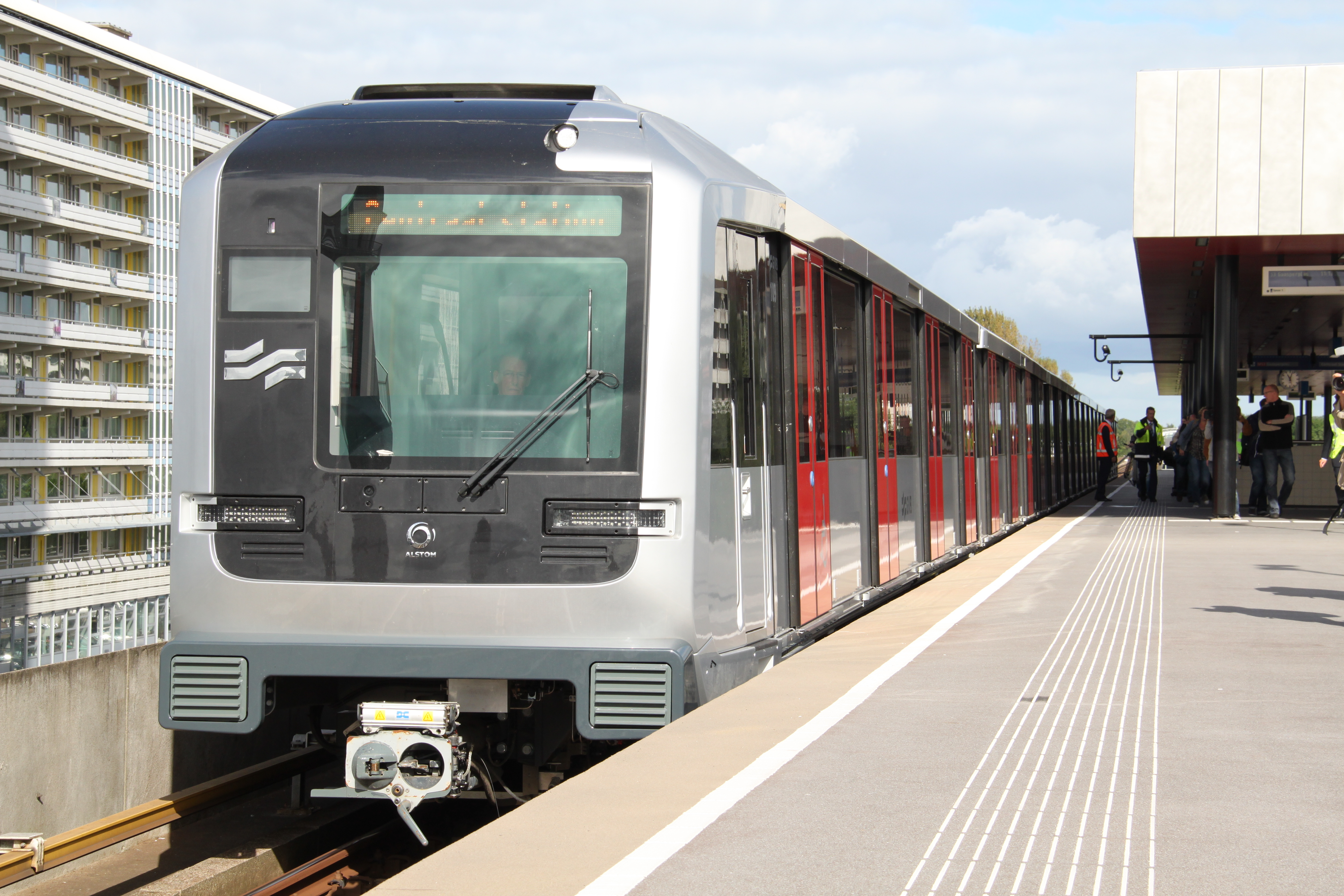
Amsterdam Metro

- 1,435 mm (4 ft 8 1/2 in) (standard gauge)
- Power: 750V DC (third rail)
- Amsterdam, Diemen, Ouder-Amstel

=== Metro routes ===
- 50: Isolatorweg – Station Sloterdijk – Station Lelylaan – Station Zuid – Station Bijlmer ArenA – Gein
- 51: Isolatorweg – Station Sloterdijk – Station Lelylaan – Station Zuid – Amstelstation – Centraal Station
- 52: Station Zuid – Rokin – Amsterdam Centraal - Station Noord
- 53: Amsterdam Centraal – Amstelstation – Station Diemen Zuid – Gaasperplas
- 54: Amsterdam Centraal – Amstelstation – Station Bijlmer ArenA – Gein

== Light rail ==
- 1,435 mm (4 ft 8 1/2 in) (standard gauge)
- Power: 600V DC (overhead)
- Amsterdam, Amstelveen

=== Former light rail route ===
- 51: Amsterdam Centraal – Amstelstation – Station Zuid – Buitenveldert – Amstelveen Westwijk

Until 3 March 2019, line 51 to Amstelveen was a metro service between Central Station and Station Zuid. At Station Zuid it switched from third rail to pantograph and catenary wires. From there to Amstelveen Centrum it shared its track with tram line 5. The light rail vehicles on this line were capable of using both 600V (overhead) and 750V DC (third rail) power supplies.

== Tram ==
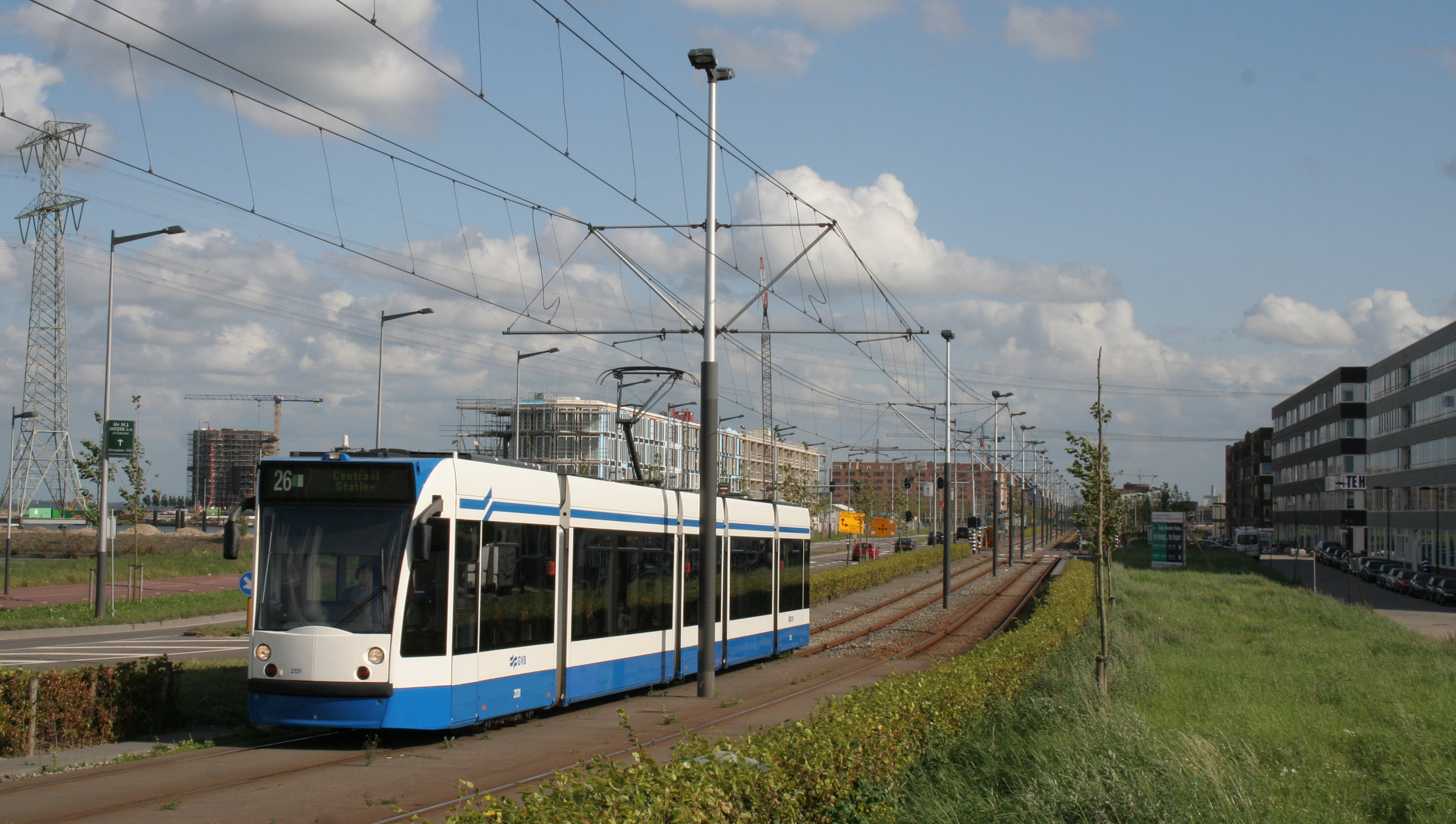
Amsterdam Tram

- 1,435 mm (4 ft 8 1/2 in) (standard gauge)
- Power: 600V DC (overhead)
- Amsterdam, Amstelveen, Diemen, Uithoorn

=== Tram routes ===
- 1: Amsterdam Muiderpoort – Vijzelgracht – Leidseplein – Station Lelylaan – Osdorp De Aker
- 2: Amsterdam Centraal – Leidsestraat – Hoofddorpplein – Nieuw Sloten
- 3: Zoutkeetsgracht – Ceintuurbaan – Muiderpoortstation – Flevopark
- 4: Amsterdam Centraal – Utrechtsestraat – Station RAI
- 5: Westerpark – Elandsgracht – Leidseplein – Museumplein – Station Zuid – Amstelveen Stadshart
- 7: Slotermeer – Leidseplein – Azartplein
- 12: Amsterdam Centraal – Leidseplein – Museumplein – Ceintuurbaan – Amstelstation
- 13: Amsterdam Centraal – Rozengracht – Geuzenveld
- 14: Amsterdam Centraal – Dam – Artis Zoo – Flevopark
- 17: Amsterdam Centraal – Rozengracht – Station Lelylaan – Osdorp Dijkgraafplein
- 19: Amsterdam Sloterdijk – Bos en Lommer – Elandsgracht – Leidseplein – Vijzelgracht – Diemen Sniep
- 24: Amsterdam Centraal – Rokin – Vijzelgracht – De Pijp – Ceintuurbaan – VU Medisch Centrum
- 25: Station Zuid – Buitenveldert – Amstelveen Westwijk - Uithoorn
- 26: Amsterdam Centraal – Piet Heintunnel – IJburg
- 27: Dijkgraafplein - Surinameplein (This route operates during Weekday AM rush hour only)

== Buses ==
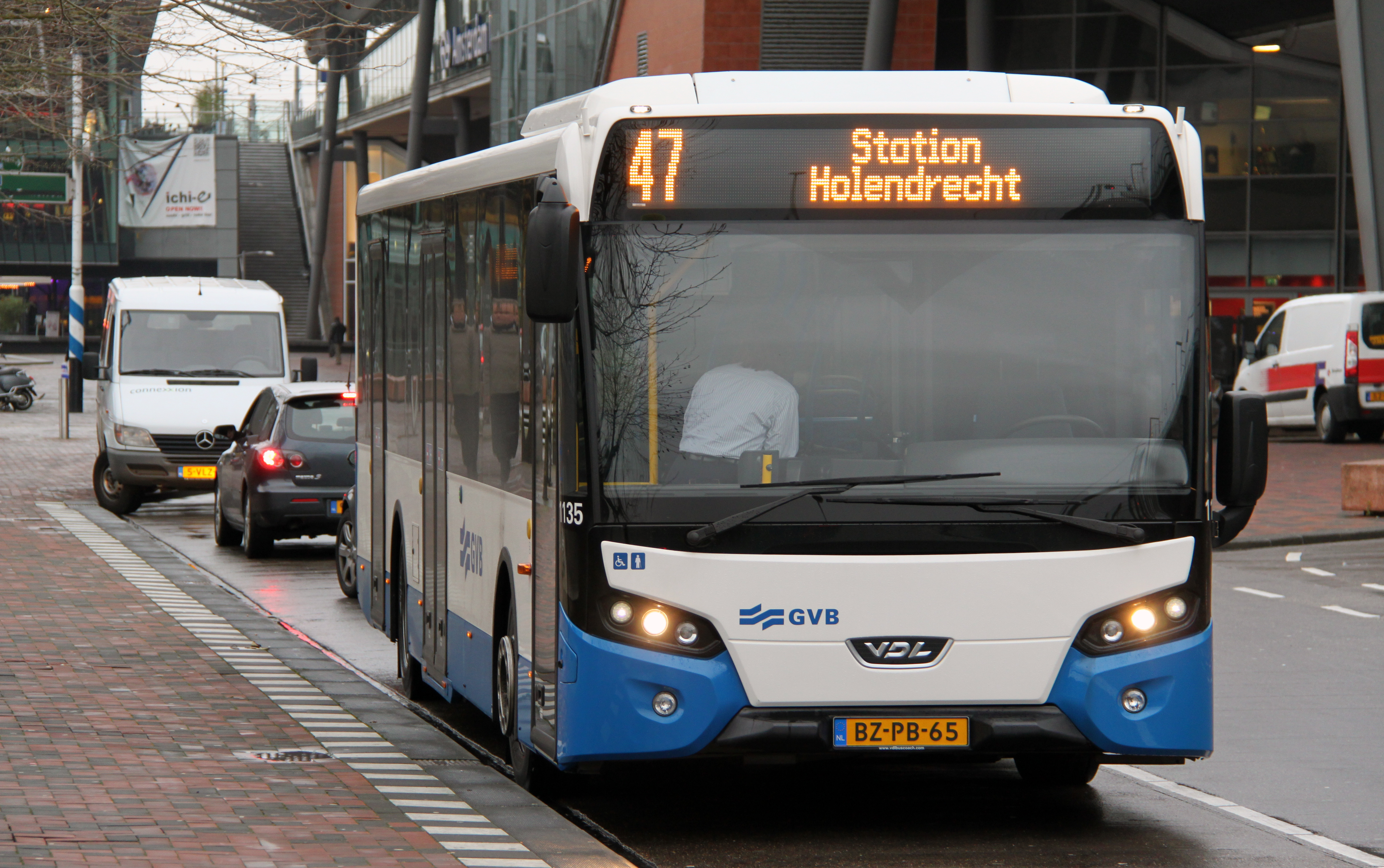
Amsterdam Bus

As of March 2021, GVB bus services had 22 regular daytime routes (numbered between 15–68), 8 rush-hour routes (200-series route numbers), 11 night routes (numbered as "N" plus two digits) of which just 2 routes run seven days a week. One route (369) runs between Schiphol Airport and Sloterdijk station (railway and metro connections). Three routes (461, 463, 464) offer free rides to the Gelderlandplein shopping centre in the Buitenveldert neighbourhood of Amsterdam.

As of March 2021, there were 233 buses in the fleet of which 31 were electric.

The busiest bus route as of 2017, is bus route 21, running every 8 minutes or less, seven days a week.

=== Bus routes ===
Line	Route	Notes
15	Station Sloterdijk – Station Zuid	
18	Amsterdam Centraal – Slotervaart	
21	Amsterdam Centraal – Geuzenveld	
22	Station Sloterdijk – Muiderpoortstation	
34	Noorderpark (metrostation) – Olof Palmeplein	
35	Molenwijk – Olof Palmeplein	
36	Station Noord – Station Sloterdijk	
37	Station Noord – Amstelstation	
38	Buiksloterham – Station Noord	
40	Amstelstation – Muiderpoortstation	
41	Station Holendrecht – Muiderpoortstation	
43	Amsterdam Centraal – Borneo-eiland	
44	Station Bijlmer ArenA – Diemen-Noord	
47	Station Bijlmer ArenA – Station Holendrecht	
48	Amsterdam Centraal – Houthavens	
49	Station Bijlmer ArenA – Station Weesp	Operates during daytime hours on weekdays only.
61	Station Sloterdijk – Osdorpplein	
62	Station Lelylaan – Amstelstation	
63	Station Lelylaan – Osdorp De Aker	
65	KNSM-eiland – Station Zuid	
66	Station Bijlmer ArenA – IJburg	
68	Metrostation Henk Sneevlietweg – Riekerpolder	Operates during daytime hours on weekdays only.
231	Station Sloterdijk – Abberdaan	Rush hour commuter route
232	Station Sloterdijk – Westpoort	Rush hour commuter route
233	Station Sloterdijk – Westpoort	Rush hour commuter route
245	Molenwijk – Schiphol Zuid	Early morning one-way route to Schipol Airport
246	Borneo-eiland – Schiphol Zuid	Early morning one-way route to Schipol Airport
247	Bos en Lommerplein – Schiphol Zuid	Early morning one-way route to Schipol Airport
267	Anderlechtlaan – John M. Keynesplein	Rush hour commuter route
369	Station Sloterdijk – Schiphol	Operates to and from Schipol Airport
461	Gelderlandplein – Gustav Mahlerplein	Only operates during late morning and afternoon hours
463	Gelderlandplein – Bolestein	Only operates during late morning and afternoon hours
464	Gelderlandplein – Vivaldi	Only operates during late morning and afternoon hours

=== Night bus routes ===
These routes operate as a hub and spoke model. Hours of operation are extended longer on Saturday and Sunday mornings due to a later start of service for daytime routes.

Line	Route	Days of Operation
N81	Centraal Station - Station Sloterdijk	Friday and weekend nights
N82	Centraal Station - Geuzenveld	Friday and weekend nights
N83	Centraal Station - Osdorp De Aker	Friday and weekend nights
N84	Centraal Station - Amstelveen Busstation	Friday and weekend nights
N85	Centraal Station - Station Gein	Nightly
N86	Centraal Station - Station Bijlmer ArenA	Weekend nights
N87	Centraal Station - Station Bijlmer ArenA	Nightly
N88	Centraal Station - Nieuw Sloten	Friday and weekend nights
N89	Centraal Station - IJburg	Friday and weekend nights
N91	Centraal Station - Nieuwendam	Friday and weekend nights
N93	Centraal Station - Molenwijk	Friday and weekend nights

== Ferries ==
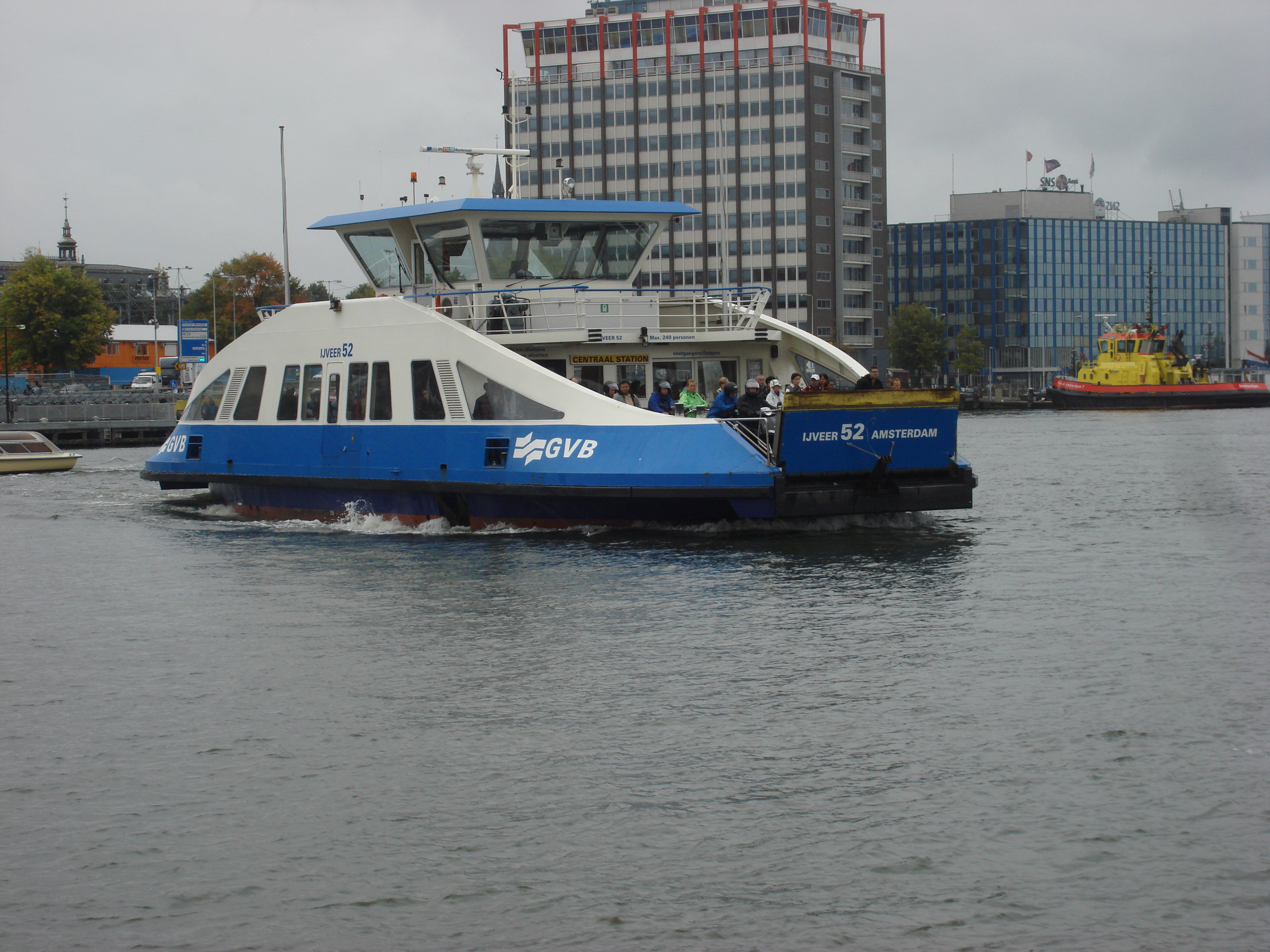
Amsterdam Ferry

Since 1 July 2013, GVB Veren (veren meaning ferries) has been operating ferry services crossing both the IJ and the North Sea Canal on behalf of the City of Amsterdam. Most of these ferries offer free rides for pedestrians and cyclists. Within the City of Amsterdam, there are seven ferry routes across the IJ, two of which operate overnight. Outside of Amsterdam, the GVB operates three ferry routes across the North Sea Canal at Zaandam, Velsen and Assendelft. The GVB has 19 ferry boats servicing these routes, and is replacing diesel-powered ferries with electrically-operated vessels. The ferries have a maximum speed of 19 kilometres per hour (12 mph).

Ferry routes crossing the IJ are:

- F1: Azartplein to Zamenhofstraat
- F2: Central Station to IJplein
- F3: Central Station to Buiksloterweg (24/7 with a 12-minute frequency between 12:00am and 6:24am)
- F4: Central Station to NDSM
- F5: Central Station to NDSM via Pontsteiger
- F6: Pontsteiger to Distelweg
- F7: Pontsteiger to NDSM
- F9: Zeeburgereiland to Sporenburg

Ferry routes crossing the North Sea Canal are:

- F20 Hempontplein to Zaandam
- F21 Spaarndam to Assendelft (24/7)
- F22 Velsen Zuid to Velsen Noord (24/7)

== Ticketing ==
The Amsterdam public transport network falls under the National Tariff System of the Netherlands and the GVB has a few of its own tickets, notably the 24-, 48- and 72- hour tickets. The electronic OV-chipkaart has been the only ticketing system valid in the Amsterdam metro since the summer of 2009, and in the rest of the network (tram, bus) since June 2010. In July of 2026, the GVB announced it has been testing a hands-free system that allows passengers to check in without scanning a phone or card. Most trams carry conductors, but as they no longer stamp passengers' strippenkaarten their role has been deskilled; it now consists in ensuring security along with selling the occasional OV-chipkaart and optionally announcing the stops.
