= Zuiderkerk =

Church in Amsterdam

Coordinates: 52°22′13″N 4°53′59″E

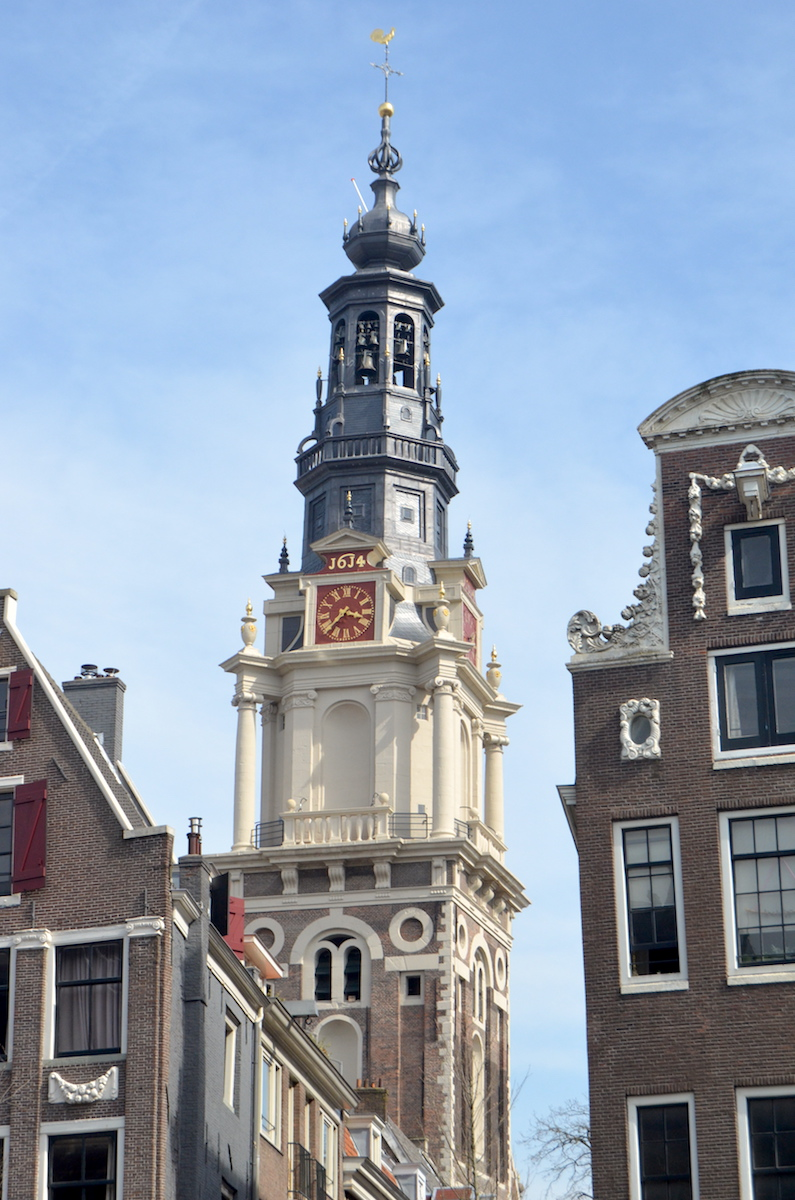
Spire of the Zuiderkerk seen from the Kloveniersburgwal canal, showing the dark grey paint applied to the top part in 2017

The Zuiderkerk (Dutch pronunciation: [ˈzœydərˌkɛr(ə)k], "southern church") is a 17th-century Reformed Protestant church in the Nieuwmarkt area of Amsterdam, the capital of the Netherlands. The church played an important part in the life of Rembrandt and was the subject of a painting by Claude Monet.

The church is open to the public and currently serves as a municipal information center with exhibitions on housing and the environment.

== History ==
The Zuiderkerk was the city's first church built specifically for Protestant services. It was constructed between 1603 and 1611 and stands on the Zuiderkerkhof ("Southern Churchyard") square near the Sint Antoniesbreestraat. The distinctive church tower, which dominates the surrounding area, was not completed until 1614 and contains a carillon of bells built by the brothers Hemony, installed in 1656 along with four bells which are rang monthly.

The design of the church in Amsterdam Renaissance style is by Hendrick de Keyser, who was also buried in the church in 1621. A memorial stone was placed on top of his tomb in 1921. De Keyser designed the church as a pseudo-basilica in Gothic style, with a central nave and two lower side aisles, six bays long, with Tuscan columns, timber barrel vaults and dormers. The stained glass in the rectangular windows was replaced by transparent glass in the 17th century. The richly detailed tower is a square stone substructure, on which an octagonal sandstone section stands with free-standing columns on the corners. On top of this is a wooden, lead-covered spire.

Three of Rembrandt's children were buried in the Zuiderkerk, which is very near to Rembrandt's house in the Jodenbreestraat. Ferdinand Bol, one of Rembrandt's most famous pupils, was buried in the Zuiderkerk in 1680.

The Zuiderkerk was used for church services until 1929. During the final (1944-1945) winter of World War II, known as the hongerwinter ("hunger winter") in the Netherlands because food was so scarce, the church was in use as a temporary morgue because people were dying faster than they could be buried. The church was closed in 1970 because it was at the point of collapse. In the years 1976–1979, the church underwent renovation, and since 1988 it serves as a municipal information centre, with regularly changing exhibitions as well as a permanent exhibition which features a scale model of Amsterdam as it is envisioned in 2020.

Since June 2006, the church also houses the "Wall of Fame", a homage to Dutch celebrities who have made a positive contribution to society, such as charitable work. The honourees include Amsterdam mayor Job Cohen, renowned former soccer player Johan Cruijff and four-time Olympic swimming champion Inge de Bruijn.

== Depiction by Monet ==
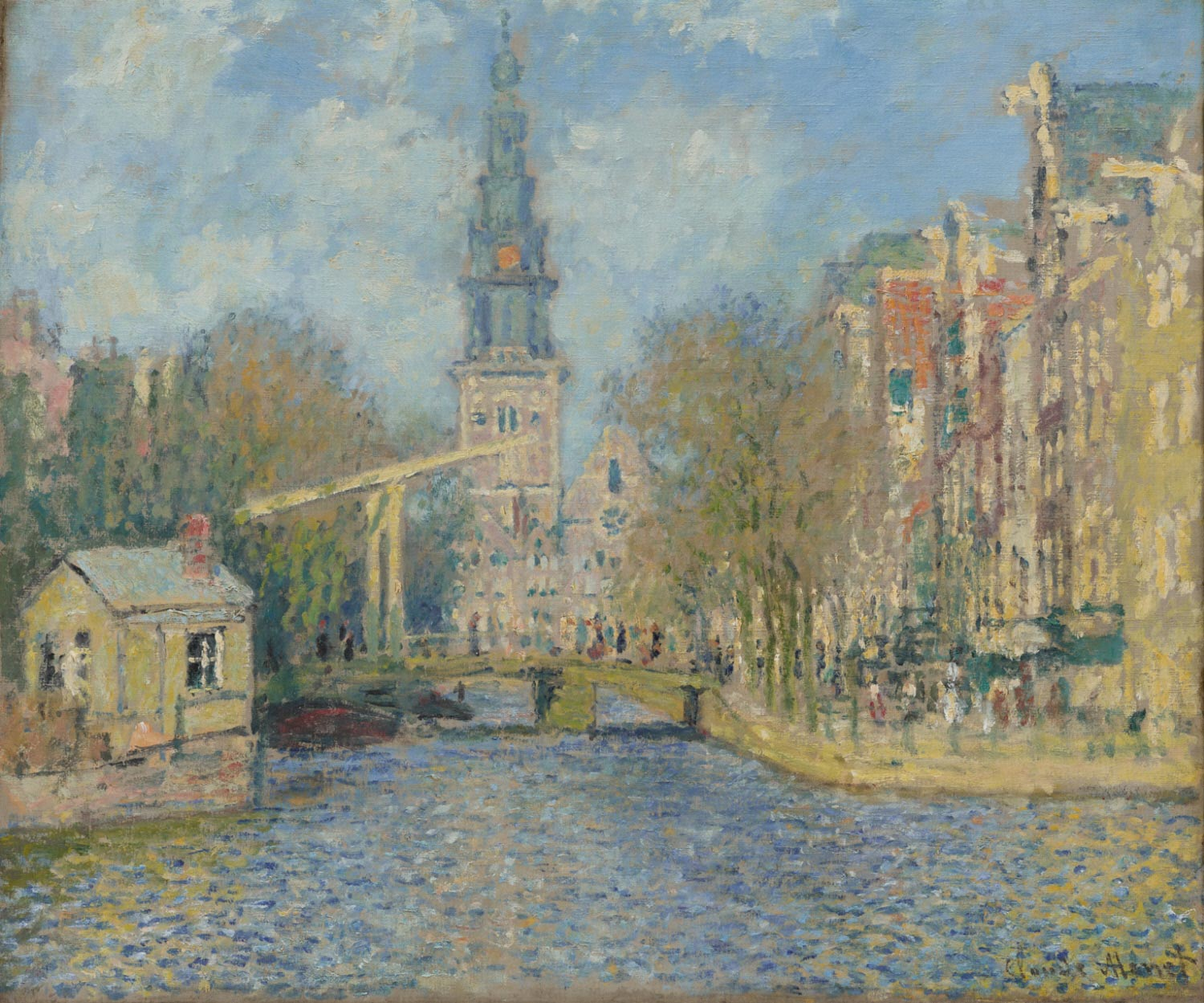
The Zuiderkerk, Amsterdam by Claude Monet

French Impressionist painter Claude Monet painted the church during a visit to the Netherlands. There is some confusion about the date of this painting, but it was probably one of 12 paintings made by Monet in 1874 during a visit to Amsterdam.

The composition is centred on the church spire, with the Groenburgwal canal leading up to it in the foreground. The reflections of the buildings on the water are represented by yellow brushstrokes only, with no detail to them.

The painting hangs in the Philadelphia Museum of Art.

== Burials ==
- Ferdinand Bol
- Richard Clyfton
- Hendrick de Keyser

== Gallery ==
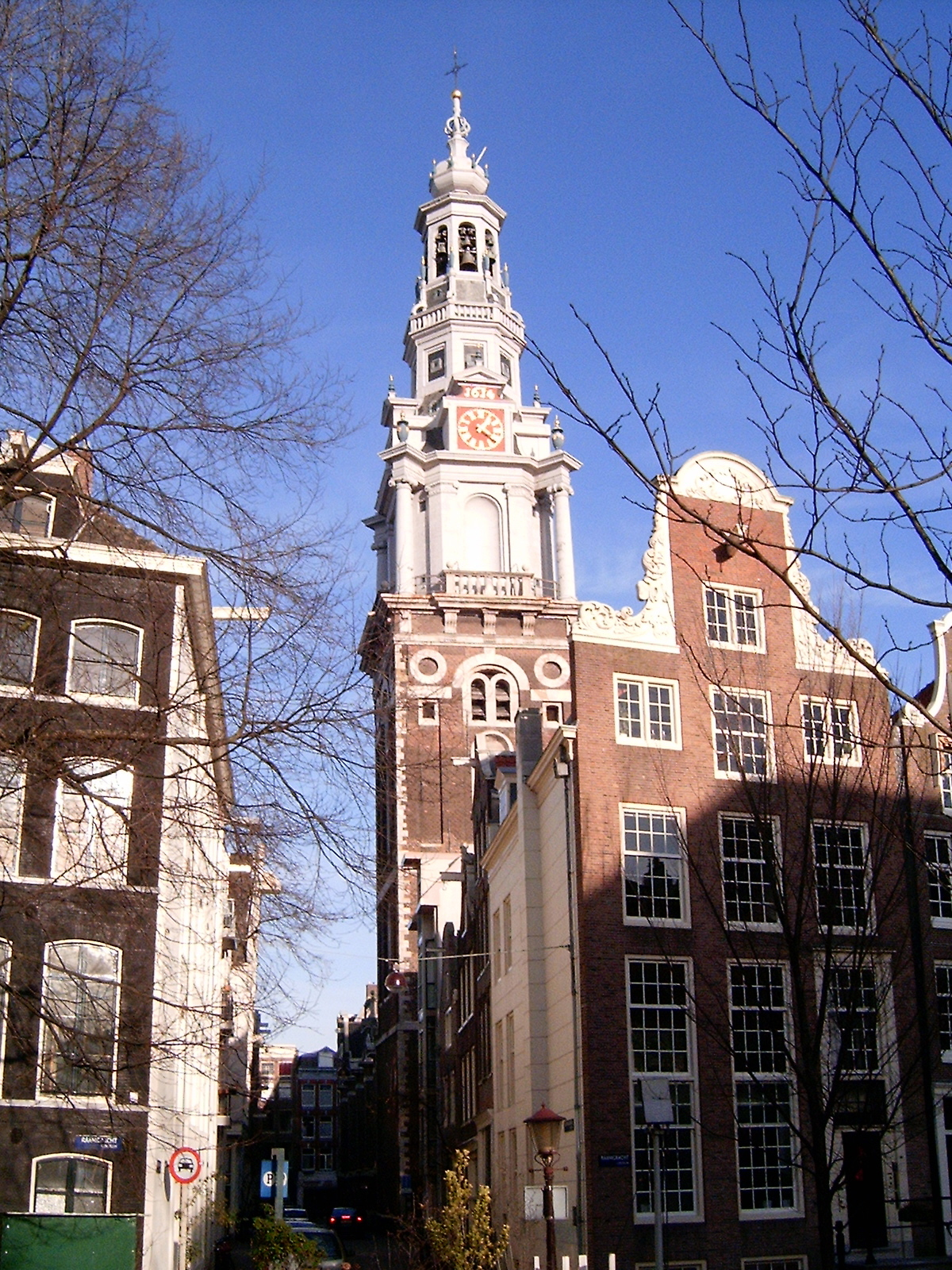
Zuiderkerk

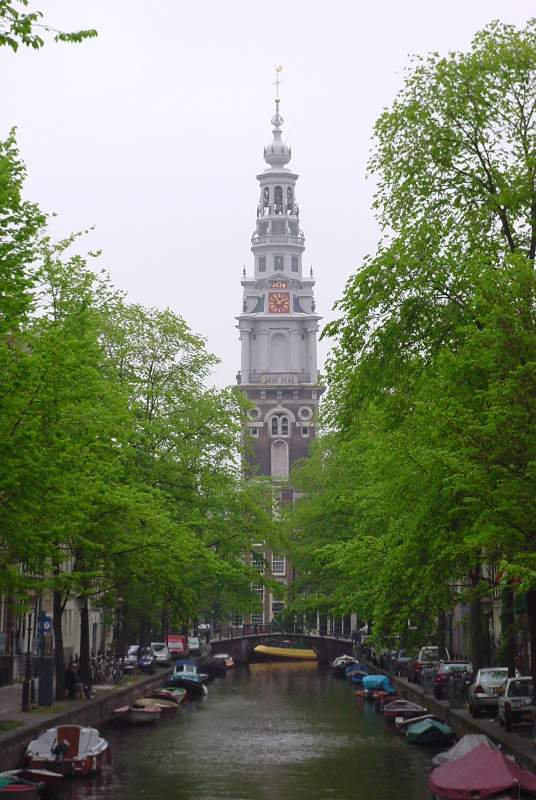
View of the Zuiderkerk from the same angle as Monet's painting

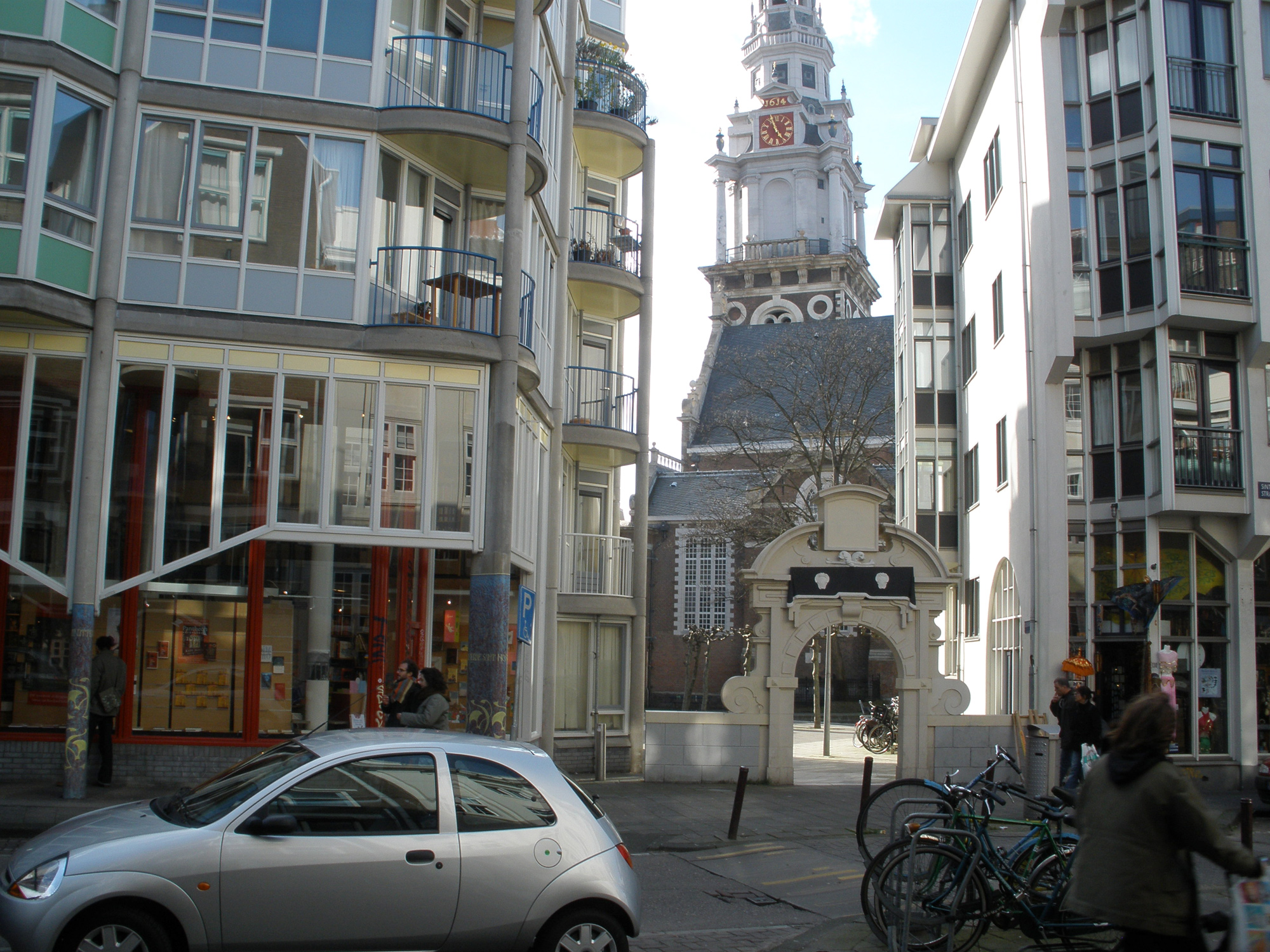
The church and the surrounding Zuiderkerkhof ("Southern Graveyard") square seen from Sint Antoniesbreestraat

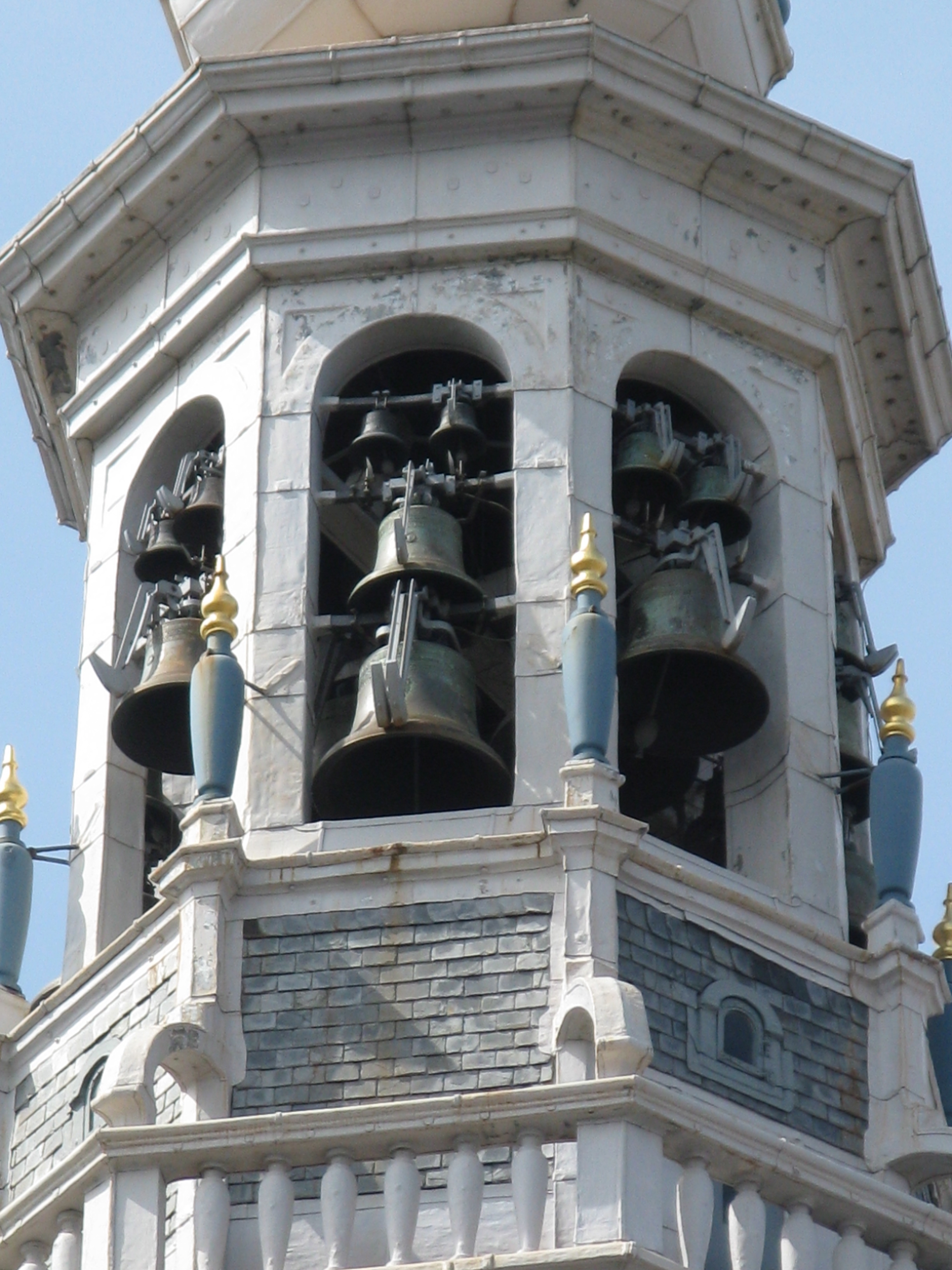
Bell tower

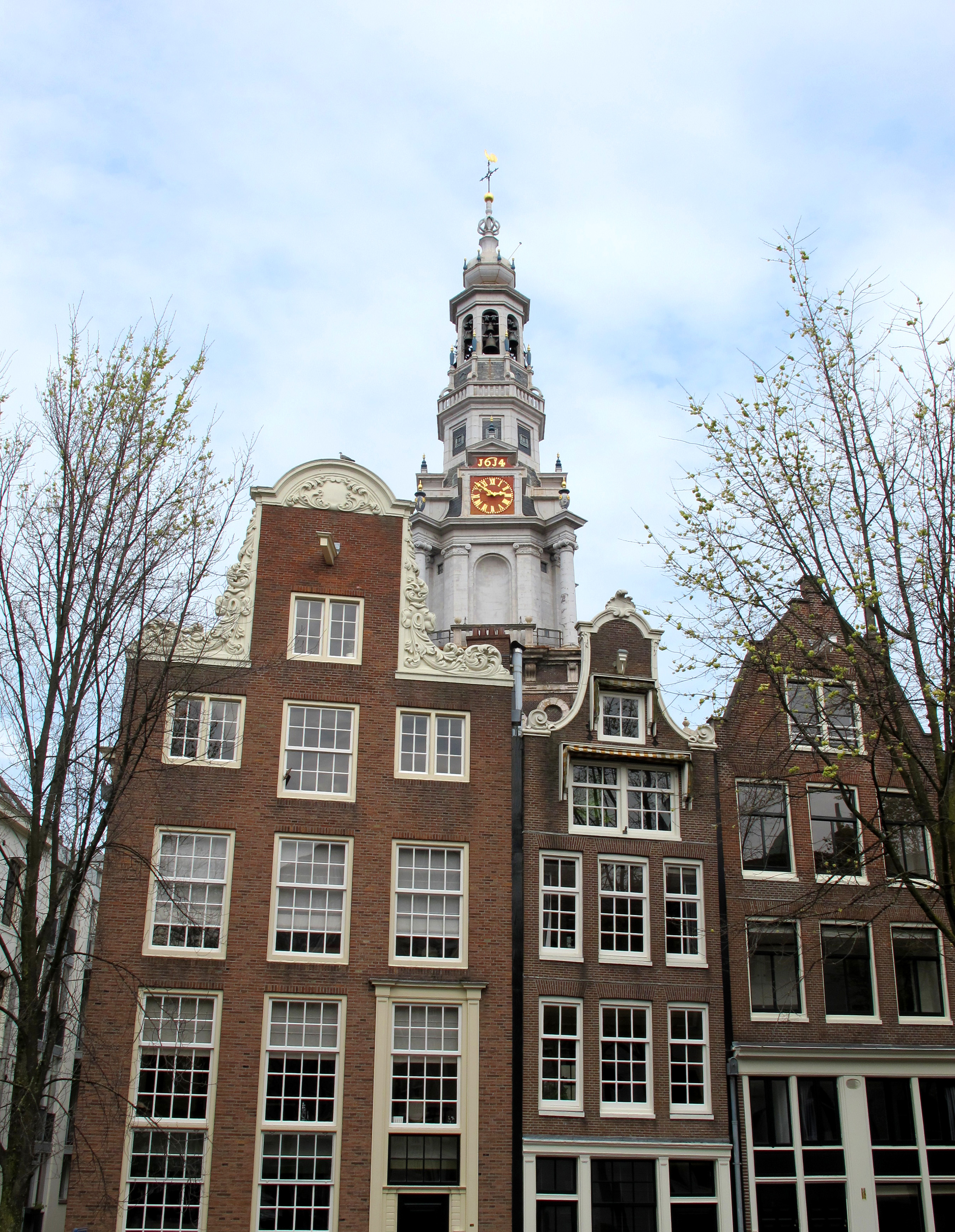
Zuiderkerk from Raamgracht
