= Sint Antoniesbreestraat =

Street in Amsterdam

Coordinates: 52°22′14″N 4°54′02″E

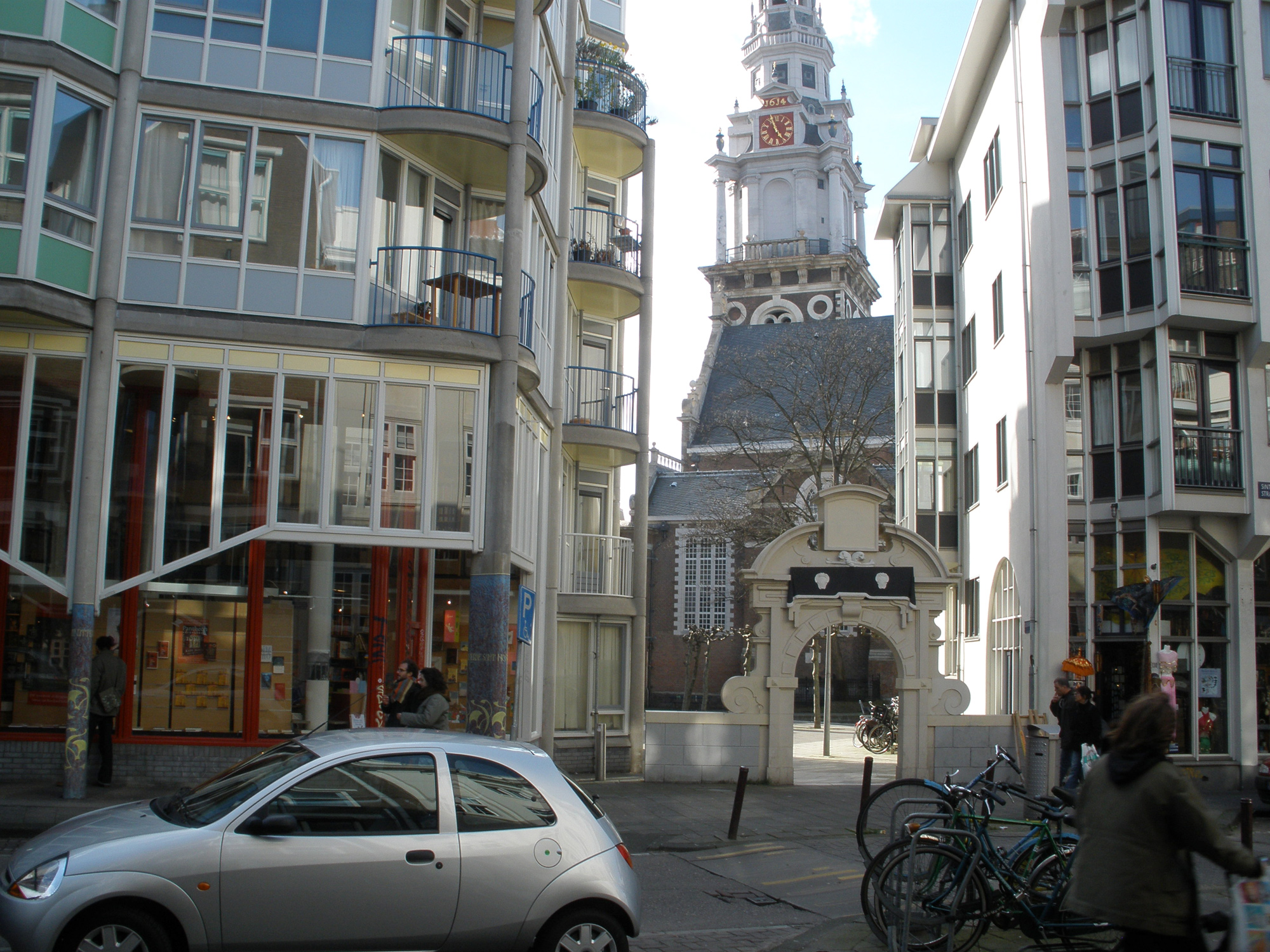
The Sint Antoniesbreestraat. The small gate provides access to Zuiderkerkhof square, where the Zuiderkerk church stands.

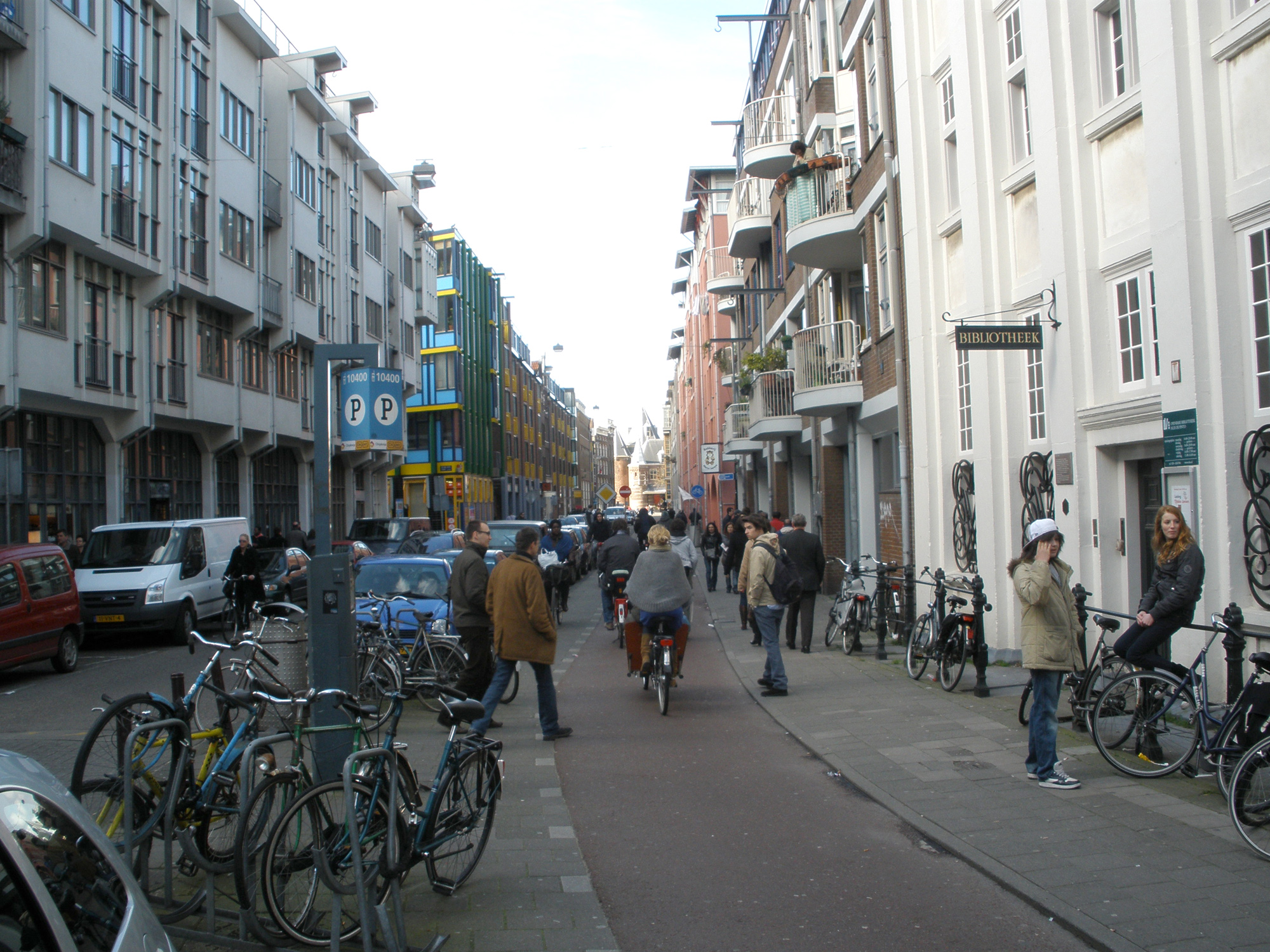
The Sint Antoniesbreestraat. On the right is Huis De Pinto, and in the distance is the Waag, a former medieval city gate, on Nieuwmarkt square.

The Sint Antoniesbreestraat ("St. Anthony's Broad Street") is a street in the centre of Amsterdam in the Netherlands. The street runs south from Nieuwmarkt square to the Sint Antoniesluis sluice gates, where it continues as the Jodenbreestraat. The Sint Antoniesbreestraat is primarily a shopping street with a variety of specialty shops. At the corner of Sint Antoniesbreestraat and Hoogstraat is an entry to the Nieuwmarkt stop of the Amsterdam Metro system.

== History ==
The street was originally a dike, the Sint Antoniesdijk, constructed during the Middle Ages. It protected the city and its surroundings from flooding. After 1585 this part of the city, called the Lastage, was developed.

In the early 17th century, the street was popular with immigrants and artists such as the painter Rembrandt, who lived there from 1631 to 1635, at the home of art dealer Hendrick van Uylenburgh. (From 1639 to 1656 he lived in his own home, now the Rembrandt House Museum.) Other painters who lived in the street, near the Guild of Saint Luke in the former Sint Anthoniespoort, include Pieter Isaacsz, Esaias Boursse, who lived next door to Rembrandt, Nicolaes Eliaszoon Pickenoy, Cornelis van der Voort, Roelant Savery, Pieter Lastman (in whose workshop Rembrandt served as apprentice), Adriaen van Nieulandt, Pieter Codde, Willem Kick, Justus and Johannes Vingboons, and their father David Vinckboons. The burgomasters Geurt van Beuningen and Joan Huydecoper grew up here.

The Huis De Pinto (or Pintohuis) is a 17th-century house with an Italianate facade. The property was built in c.1605 and purchased by the banker Isaac de Pinto in 1651. When the house was remodeled in Dutch Classical style in 1686, it became the "talk of the town" due to the dramatic style of its exterior and interior. The 18th-century philosopher Isaac de Pinto was raised in the house. Since 2014, the building houses a cultural centre.

Across from the De Pinto House is a gate that provides access to the Zuiderkerkhof, the square where the Zuiderkerk church stands.

Since the 17th century, the section of the street south of the sluice and bridge has been called Jodenbreestraat ("Jewish Broad Street"). The straight and wide Jodenbreestraat runs through the former Jewish quarter of Amsterdam. During World War II, many residents were taken away to the Nazi concentration camps and the neighbourhood was left practically deserted.

After the war, the abandoned houses were left in a decrepit state and many were torn down. Plans were made to build new houses, as well as a highway and metro line through the street. These plans were met by heavy rioting in 1975. (The highway plans were abandoned in 1972; the metro however was constructed.) New houses were built along the existing Sint Antoniesbreestraat, and the Huis de Pinto, which had become a symbol of the movement to save the neighbourhood, was renovated and now serves as a public library.
