= Justus Lange =

German art historian and curator (born 1968)

Justus Lange (born 1968) is a German art historian and curator, known for his work with Old Masters, and a curator at the Gemäldegalerie Alte Meister in Kassel, Germany.

== Biography ==
Justus Lange was born in Kempen, near the Dutch border. His family moved to Stuttgart, where he was raised and attended school. He developed an interest in modern and contemporary art at a young age, frequently visiting the State Gallery in Stuttgart. A tour of the Beuys Room inspired him to pursue a career in art history.

Lange studied art history at the University of Würzburg, focusing on the art of the Old Masters. During a year of study in Salamanca in 1993/94, he developed a passion for Spanish art.

In 1998, Lange organized an exhibition on Dostoevsky and German Expressionism at the University of Würzburg. He completed his PhD on the Spanish-Italian baroque artist Jusepe de Ribera.

== Career ==
In early 2001, Lange was appointed assistant curator at the Gemäldegalerie Alte Meister in Kassel. He assisted in the major exhibition "The Mystery of the Young Rembrandt," in collaboration with Museum Het Rembrandthuis and the Rembrandt Research Project in Amsterdam. Lange also curated exhibitions on Martin Schaffner (2002) and "Pan and Syrinx" by Rubens and Brueghel (2004).

In 2004, Lange became the curator of paintings, graphic art, and sculpture at the Municipal Museum of Braunschweig. He curated numerous exhibitions and collaborated on a general catalogue of the museum's paintings, published in 2009.

In December 2009, Lange returned to Kassel as Head of the Old Masters at the Gemäldegalerie Alte Meister). This role included overseeing the gallery's extensive collection and organizing significant exhibitions, such as those focused on the role of light in Dutch Old Master paintings, as by Rembrandt and the works of Jacob Jordaens.

== Research and contributions ==
Lange's research interests include the art of the Old Masters and modern art. His exhibitions and catalogues have significantly contributed to the understanding and appreciation of important artworks by artists from Northern Europe.

== Exhibitions ==
- Potter, Paulus Potter! A Masterpiece Returns (19-04-2024 – 31–12–2024), curator at Gemäldegalerie Alte Meister, Kassel
- Old Masters with a Queer Twist (15-12-2023 – 24–03–2024), curator at Gemäldegalerie Alte Meister, ] Kassel
- Frans Hals Inspires – The Man in the Slouch Hat (15-06-2023 – 03–09–2023), curator at Gemäldegalerie Alte Meister, Kassel
- Kassel… verliebt in Saskia. Liebe und Ehe in Rembrandts Zeit (12-04-2019 – 11–08–2019), curator at Gemäldegalerie Alte Meister, Kassel
- Kunst und Illusion – Das Spiel mit dem Betrachter (15-07-2016 – 15–01–2017), curator at Gemäldegalerie Alte Meister, Kassel
- Mene, Mene Tekel – das Gastmahl des Belsazar in der niederländischen Malerei (09-10-2014 – 17–05–2015), curator at Gemäldegalerie Alte Meister, Kassel
- "Die holländischen Bilder hab ich freilich gern": Wilhelm Busch und die Alten Meister (06-09-2013 – 09–02–2014), Kassel
- Jordaens und die Antike (01-03-2013 – 16–06–2013), curator
- Lichtgefüge: das Licht im Zeitalter von Rembrandt und Vermeer (18-11-2011 – 26–02–2012), curator at Gemäldegalerie Alte Meister, Kassel
- Pan und Syrinx, eine erotische Jagd: Gemälde und Graphik von Peter Paul Rubens, Jan Brueghel und ihren Zeitgenossen (19-03-2004 – 13–06–2004), curator at Gemäldegalerie Alte Meister, Kassel
- Het mysterie van de junge Rembrandt (20-02-2002 – 26–05–2002), curator at Museum Rembrandthuis
