= Esaias Boursse =

Dutch painter

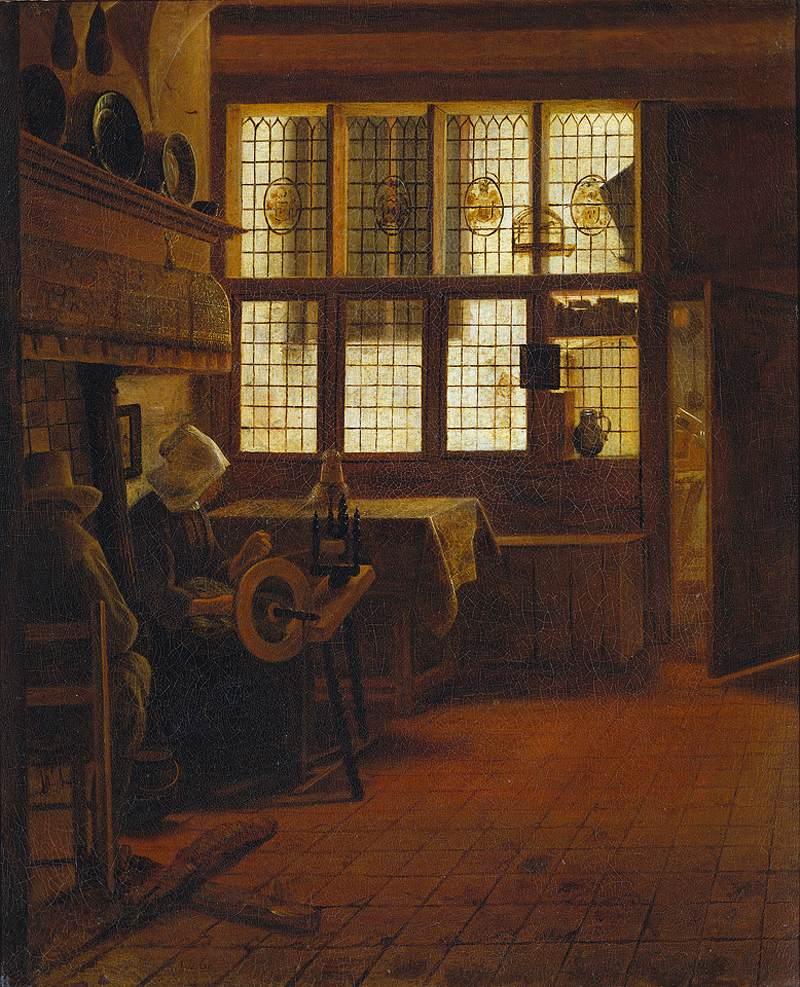
Esaias Boursse, Interior with Woman at Wheel, 1661

Esaias Boursse (March 3, 1631 – November 16, 1672) was a Dutch painter. His paintings were mainly genre works.

== Biography ==
He was born in Amsterdam, the youngest son of immigrants from Wallonia. His parents, Jacques Boursse and Anna des Forest, married in 1618 in Amsterdam. Nothing is known about the education of Esaias Boursse, other than that he travelled to Italy in about 1650 to study the great Renaissance examples. No reminders of those examples are to be found in his work. In the past art historians have tried to place him among Rembrandt's pupils, but there is no objective evidence to prove this, although the painters were neighbours in the Sint Antoniebreestraat in Amsterdam (nowadays called Jodenbreestraat, still housing the Rembrandt House Museum).

Boursse's financial position will not have been good, since in 1661 he sailed with the Verenigde Oostindische Compagnie, on the ship Amersfoort. It travelled to Ceylon (nowadays called Sri Lanka). Boursse drew the inhabitants, landscapes and city views, which have been preserved in an album which can be found in the print room of the Rijksmuseum Amsterdam. In 1663, the painter was back in Amsterdam.

In 1672, Boursse sailed with Verenigde Oostindische Compagnie again. On November 16 he died at sea, on board the ship Rhenen.

Boursse could not earn a living by painting alone and therefore had to look for an alternative source of income, like Jan Steen (who was also an innkeeper) and Johannes Vermeer (who was also an art dealer). Boursse seems to have remained unmarried and childless. Financially, Boursse's career was a success.

== Work ==
Boursse's work mainly deals with family life. Women spinning or sewing and families around a fireplace are examples of what to expect. Stylistically, his work is reminiscent of Pieter de Hooch, Quiringh van Brekelenkam and Cornelis de Man. About 28 paintings remain of his work, mostly in private collections. Works by Boursse to be found online are:

- Rijksmuseum Amsterdam: "Interior with a woman sewing" (1661)
- Wallace Collection London: "Interior with a woman cooking" (1653)

His work is also part of the collections of the Museum Boijmans van Beuningen in Rotterdam, the Suermondt-Ludwig-Museum in Aachen, the Gemäldegalerie in Berlin, the Frits Lugt-collection (Fondation Custodia) in Paris and the Johannesburg Art Gallery.
