= Jodenbreestraat =

Street in Amsterdam

Coordinates: 52°22′9″N 4°54′11″E

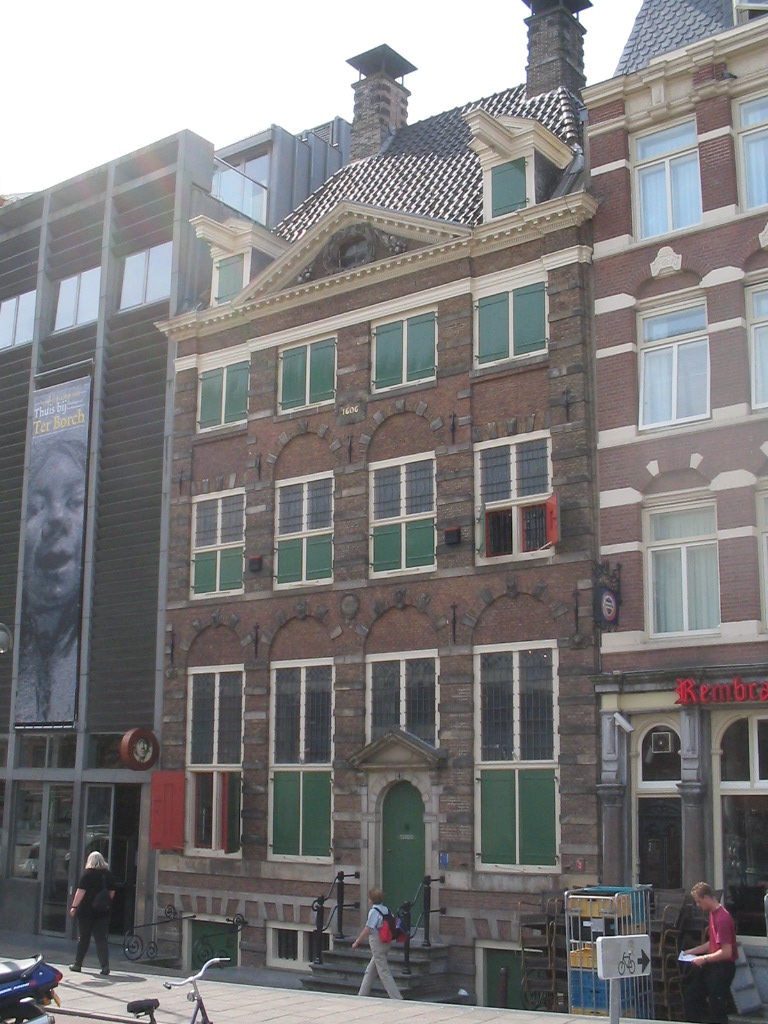
The Rembrandthuis was home to the painter Rembrandt from 1639 to 1656

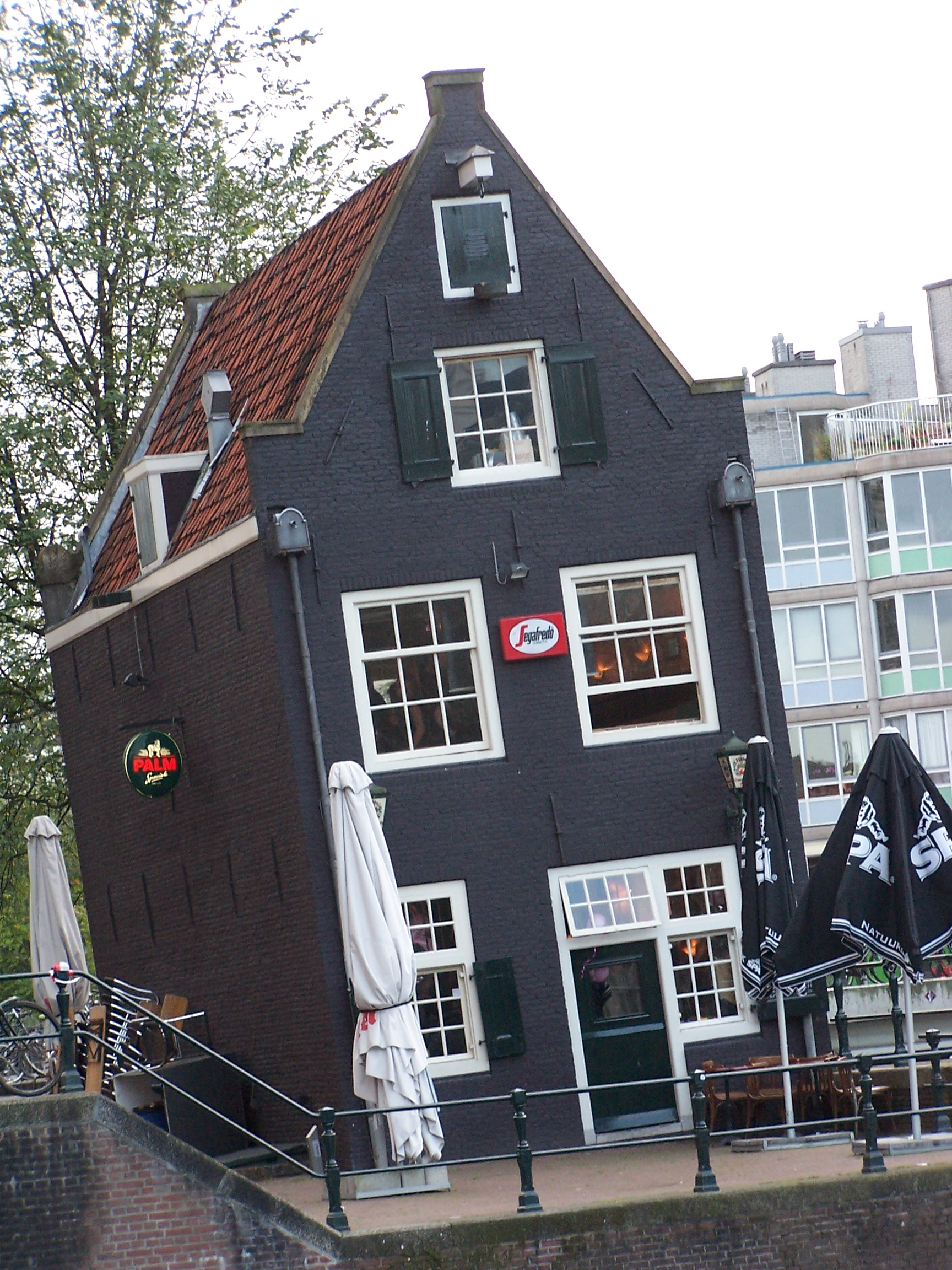
Jodenbreestraat 1

The Jodenbreestraat ("Jewish Broad Street") is a street in the centre of Amsterdam, which connects the Sint Antoniesluis sluice gates to the Mr. Visserplein traffic circle. North of the sluice gates, the street continues on to Nieuwmarkt square as the Sint Antoniesbreestraat. The Mozes en Aäronkerk church stands at the southern end of the street. Directly behind the Jodenbreestraat is Waterlooplein square with its daily flea market.

The philosopher Baruch Spinoza was born in a house that stood where the Mozes en Aäronkerk church now stands. The painter Rembrandt lived from 1639 to 1656 in what is now the Rembrandthuis museum. Opposite the museum is a sculpture bearing a poem by Jacob Israël de Haan.

== History ==
The street was originally part of the Sint Antoniesbreestraat. In the 17th century, many Jewish emigrants from Portugal and Spain settled in the neighbourhood, and in the second half of the century, the southern section of the Sint Antoniesbreestraat came to be known as Jodenbreestraat ("Jewish Broad Street").

The street served as a marketplace until the late 19th century. In 1893, the city government ordered the merchants to move their stalls to nearby Waterlooplein square.

Rembrandt lived in this street, from 1631 to 1635, at the home of art dealer Hendrick van Uylenburgh, and again from 1639 to 1656, in his own house, built in 1606 and still standing today. It now houses the Rembrandthuis museum. The street was also popular with other artists, such as the painter Esaias Boursse, who lived next door to Rembrandt.

During the German occupation of the Netherlands in World War II, most residents of Amsterdam's Jewish neighbourhood were deported to the concentration camps where they were murdered. After the war, the neighbourhood was left deserted. Many of the houses began to deteriorate and were eventually demolished. In the 1960s, the city government unveiled plans to build a dual carriageway through the Jodenbreestraat, as well as a metro line underneath the street. To prepare for construction, Jodenbreestraat was significantly widened by demolishing the remaining houses along the north side of the street. However, following heavy riots in 1975, the plans for the dual carriageway were abandoned.

Along the empty north side of the street, a huge new building was constructed in 1971, stretching the entire length of the street: the Burgemeester Tellegenhuis. Popularly known as the "Maupoleum", it was repeatedly voted the ugliest building in Amsterdam, and was finally demolished in 1994 and replaced with two large buildings which house, among others, offices for the Amsterdam School of the Arts and shop premises for supermarket chain Albert Heijn.
