= Nieuwmarkt metro station =

Metro station in Amsterdam, Netherlands

Nieuwmarkt
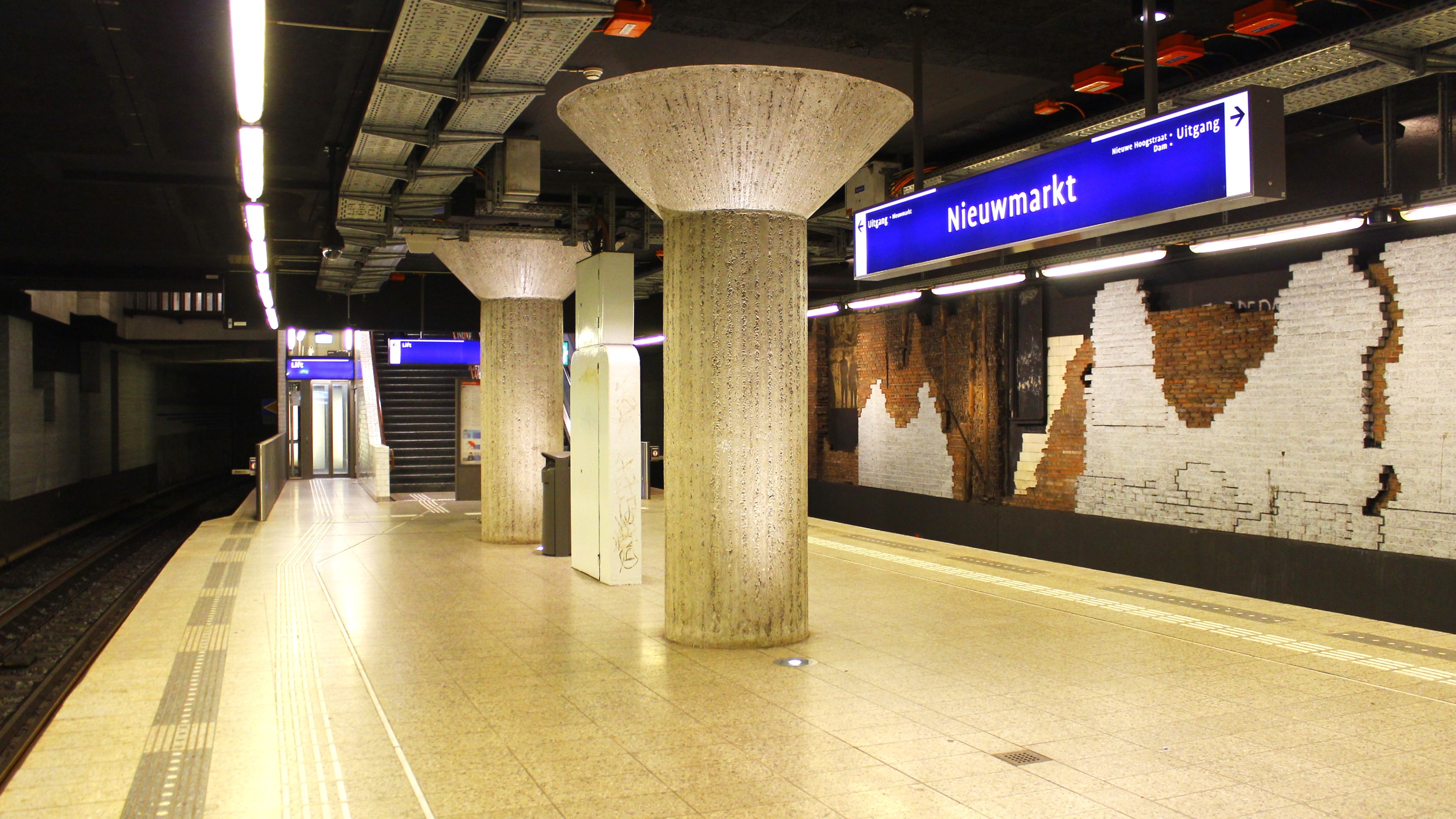

General information
- Location: Nieuwmarkt, Amsterdam, Netherlands
- Coordinates: 52°22′20″N 4°54′03″E
- Owner: GVB
- Line: 51, 53, 54 (Metro)
- Platforms: 1
- Tracks: 2

Other information
- Fare zone: 5700 (Centrum)

History
- Opened: 11 October 1980

Services
Preceding station	Amsterdam Metro	Following station
Centraal Station Terminus	Line 51	Waterlooplein towards Isolatorweg
Centraal Station Terminus	Line 53	Waterlooplein towards Gaasperplas
Centraal Station Terminus	Line 54	Waterlooplein towards Gein
Location

Nieuwmarkt is an underground metro station in the city centre of Amsterdam, Netherlands. Served by metro lines 51, 53, and 54 of the Amsterdam Metro, the station was constructed by sinking caissons with a length of 40 metres (130 ft). This construction method resulted in the demolition of parts of the Nieuwmarkt neighbourhood and was met with protests.

Despite the protests, destruction of the houses above the area started in December 1974. Construction on the station itself began in the summer of 1975. Nieuwmarkt has an island platform of 165 metres (541 ft) and two halls with a total of three entrances and was opened to the public on 11 October 1980.

There was a renovation project in 2011 and another one in 2018. Post–2012, residents have complained about vibrations from the tunnel when a metro passed by. The five artworks found throughout the station refer to the protests against the metro at the Nieuwmarkt neighbourhood. In 2020, the station was deemed to be not safe enough in case of a fire.

== Layout ==
Nieuwmarkt and other metro stations on the East Line were designed by two architects from the Government of Amsterdam: Ben Spängberg and Sier van Rhijn. It has an island platform of 165 metres (541 ft) long and 8.7 metres (29 ft) wide. Each end of the platform goes up to a hall. The entire station is under the ground. Initially there were four entrances to the station, three of which were ground floors of a building. One of the entrances was closed off later, with now only two entrances from buildings existing and three entrances in total. The station can be converted into a fallout shelter housing up to 3,000 people should it be necessary.

== History ==
=== Construction and protests ===
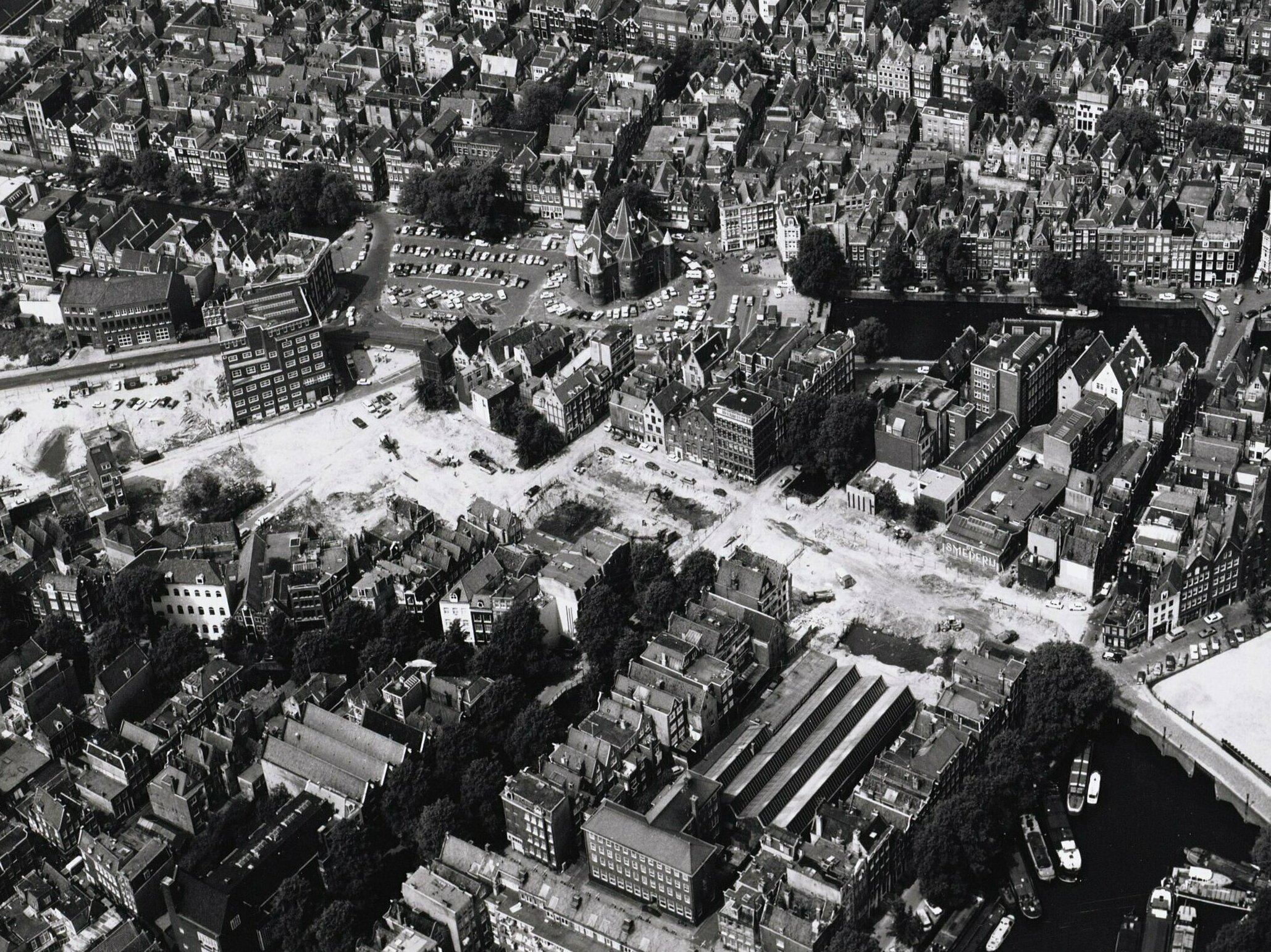
Aerial photo showing the destruction of houses above the station

Most underground areas of the line were constructed by using caissons, which made pumping out groundwater unnecessary. The caissons were built above ground on-site, and had a length of 40 metres (130 ft) and a width of 10–18 metres (33–59 ft). The earth below the caissons was rinsed with water and pumped out, lowering the caissons into place. This method required the land above the planned lines to be cleared. This was not a big problem at Weesperplein and Wibautstraat, but at Waterlooplein and Nieuwmarkt, the tunnels had to run through the old Binnenstad of Amsterdam, causing the demolition of several housing blocks. In addition, some canals in the area had to be filled in.

The destruction of houses above Nieuwmarkt started in December 1974 and was met with protests, which eventually resulted with the cancellation of all other planned metro lines. Construction on the tunnel section from Zuiderkerk to Amsterdam Centraal, which includes Nieuwmarkt station, started in the summer of 1975. The same street patterns were used during the reconstruction of the houses above after the tunnels were lowered into place. The Waterlooplein to Amsterdam Centraal section of the metro was opened on 11 October 1980.

=== Later developments ===
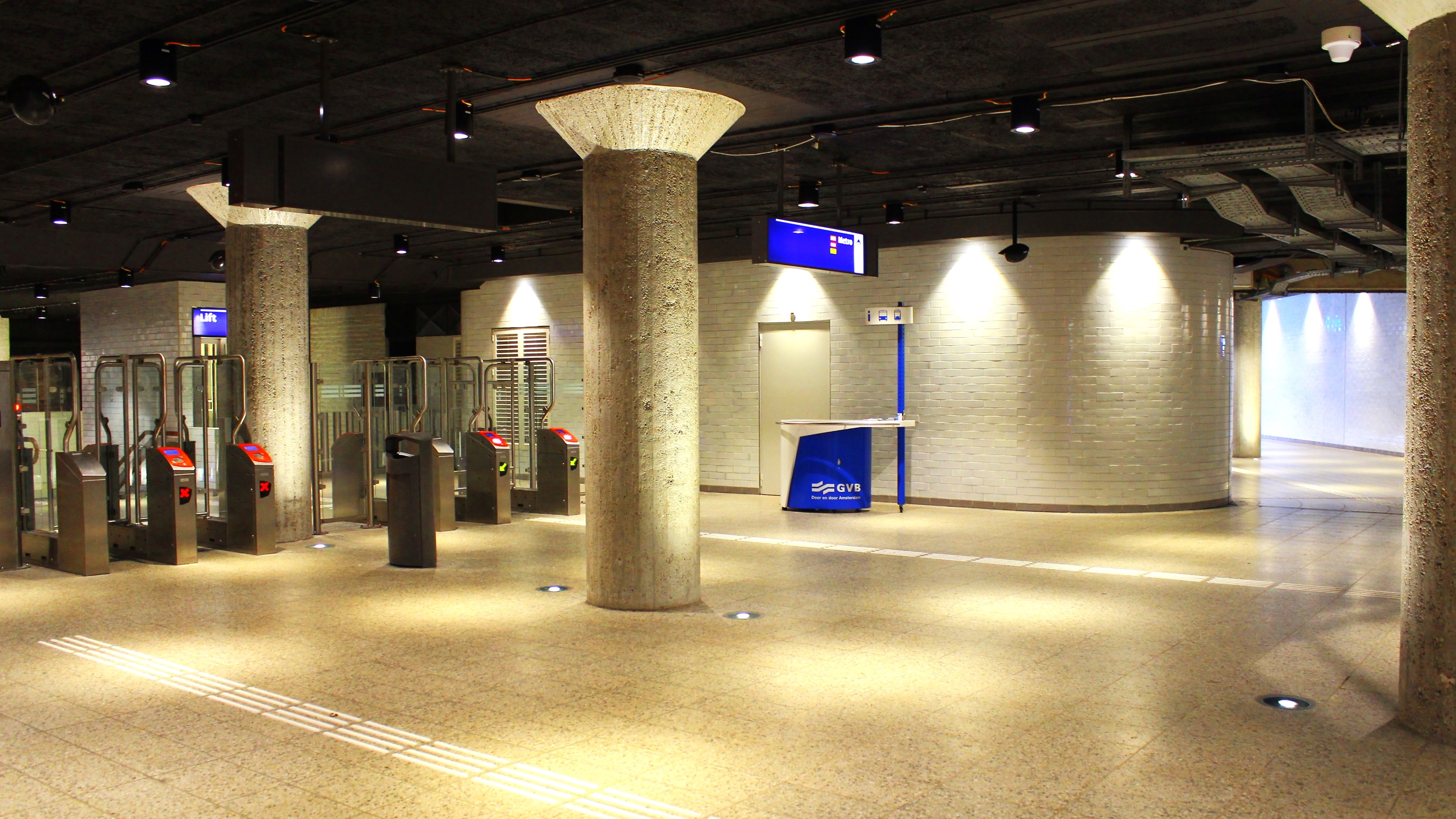
Northern entrance of the station

The station was renovated in 2011. The contractor sometimes did work without the permission of the GVB, which led to the work being halted and caused delays up to a month. The East Line was closed for the summer of 2012. When operations restarted, the residents living above the section between the Prins Hendrikkade and Stopera complained of vibrations when a metro was passing by. Investigations resulted in no cause being found for the problems, which got worse over time.

GVB started to play music through the speakers of underground metro stations on the East Line in April 2017 as a trial to improve the experience of travellers. The type of music would depend on the time of day: slow and calming music during rush hours, and energetic music during the afternoon. After receiving mostly positive feedback, the practice of playing music was also expanded to the station of Line 52 in 2025. All stations on the East Line were renovated again in late 2010s. Work on Nieuwmarkt started in early 2018. Entrances were renovated one by one. The project finished in December 2018.

In 2020, Alderwoman Sharon Dijksma wrote that the station was not safe enough in case of a major fire. It was calculated that in case of such event, only 500 people could evacuate out of the station before smoke made further exits impossible. The municipality was still allowed to run the metro lines despite the report.

== Artwork ==
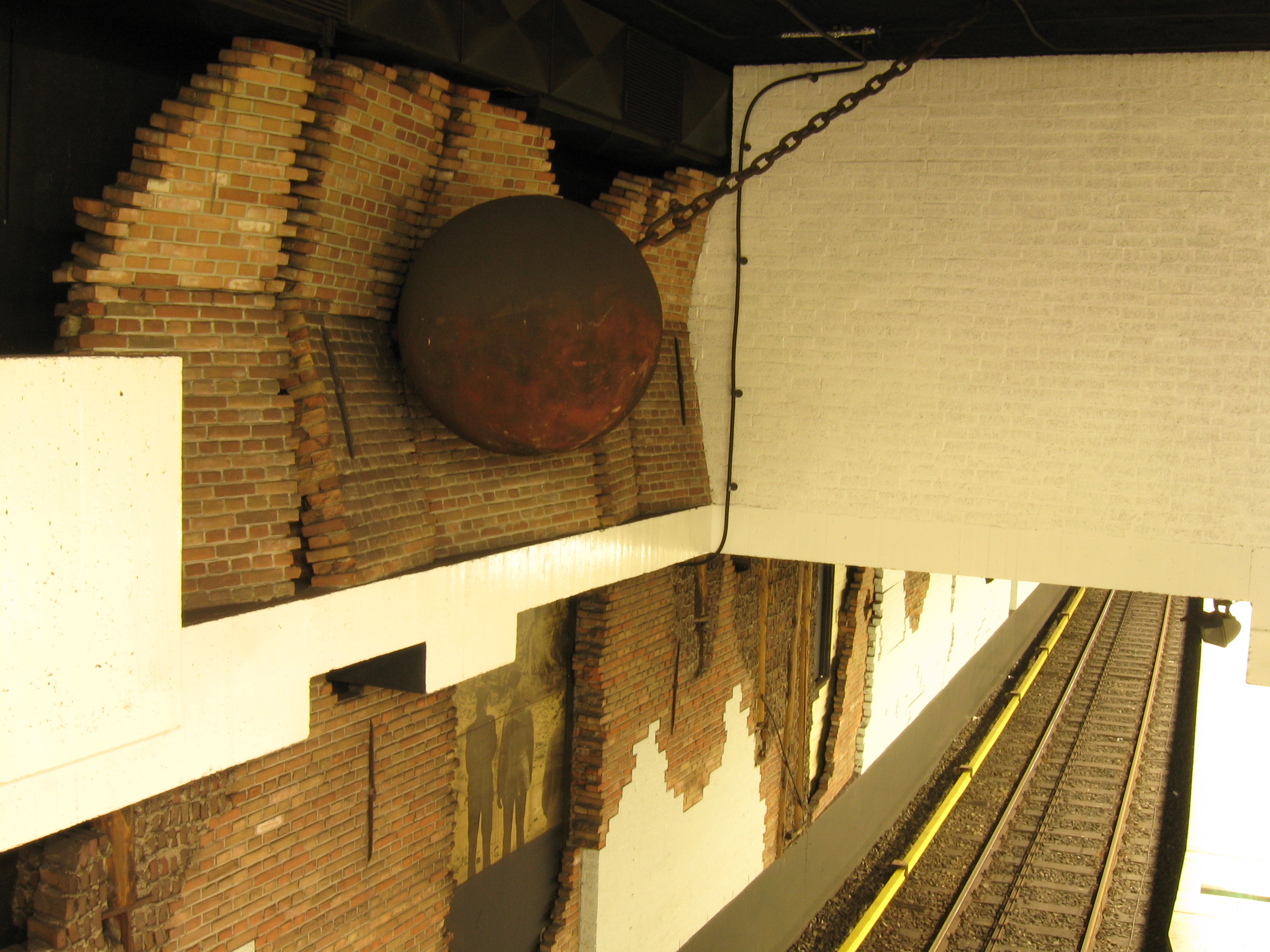
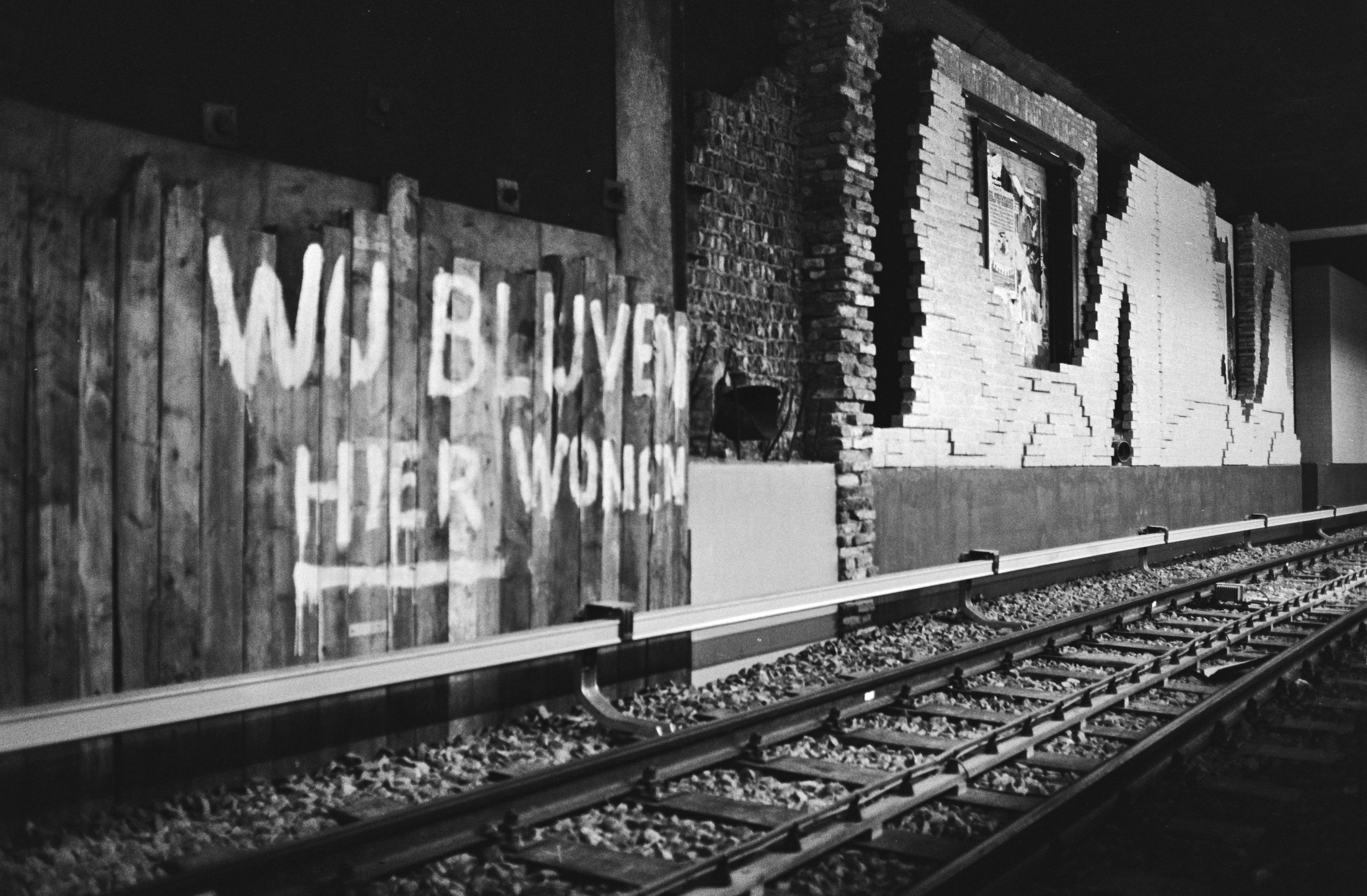
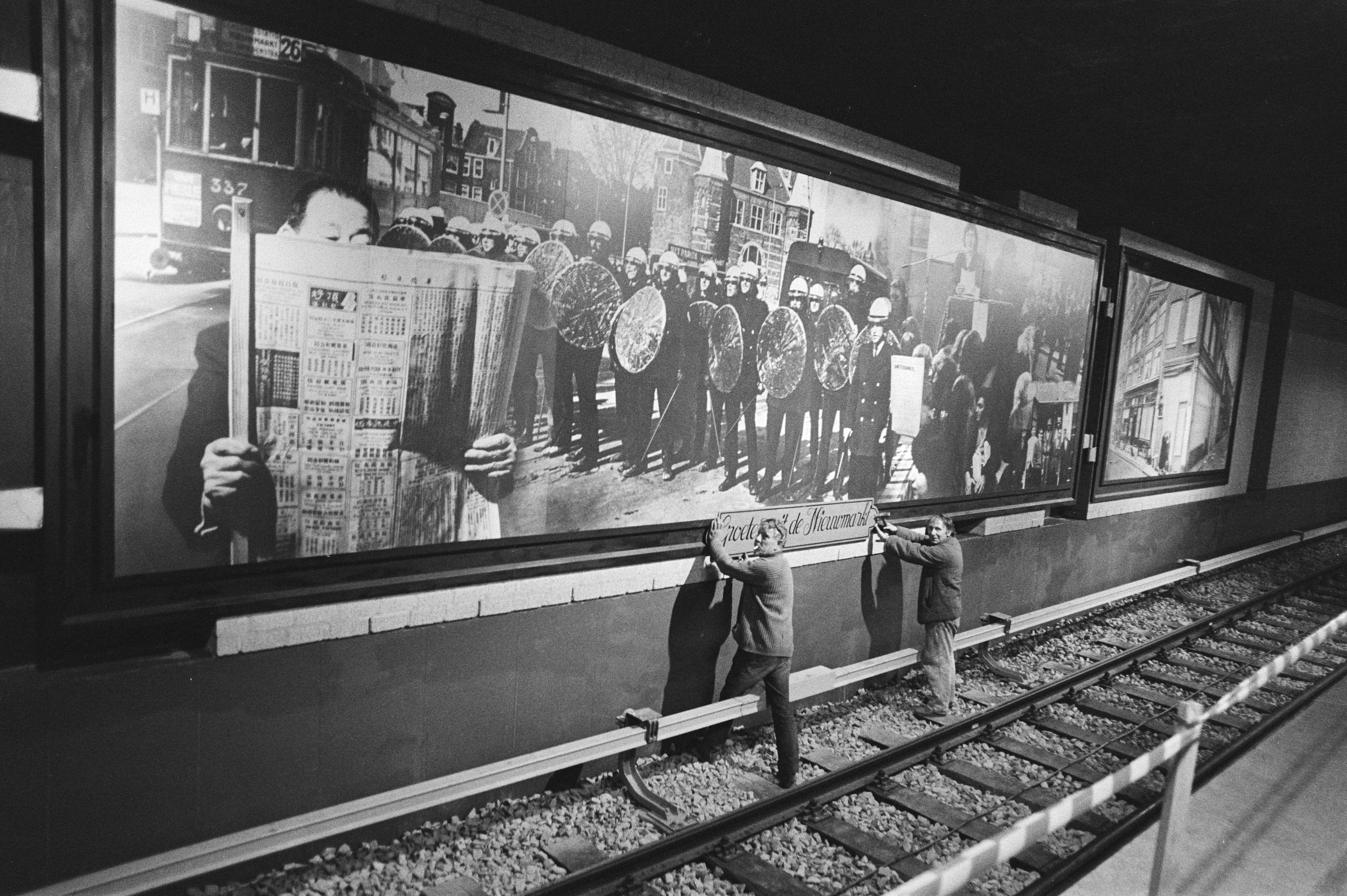
Slopersbal by Jan Sierhuis (top), Wortels van de stad by Louis van Gasteren (middle) and the text for Groeten uit de Nieuwmarkt being hanged in 1980 (bottom).

Artists were invited by officials for artwork inside the stations on the East Line, with the exception of Weesperplein and Bijlmer. The five artworks at the station form a collective work where the artists express the history of the Nieuwmarkt neighbourhood. It is not always clear where one work ends and another begins. The station became a monument of the protests that happened against it.

Louis van Gasteren's Wortels van de stad consist of wooden posts, steel beams and a fence with "We will continue to live here" (Dutch: "Wij blijven hier wonen") written on it. The artwork shows the underground part of Amsterdam and serves as a "reminder of the houses that can no longer be seen above ground". Scheuren en gaten in de wanden of Bert Griepink consists of half demolished walls, parts of wooden fences and large photos scattered all over the station showing the demolition of Nieuwmarkt and the last cries of resistance.

Slopersbal created by Jan Sierhuis depicts a wrecking ball demolishing a brick wall. Under it is another brick wall that has already been broken down. Following a friend joking about the possibility of using a wrecking ball, Sierhuis made a model of it with a tennis ball and liked the idea. Groeten uit de Nieuwmarkt was created together by all three artists and Roel van den Ende and consists of four triptychs in total. On one of the platform's walls are two triptychs consisting of photos related to the history of Amsterdam. The other two triptychs are broken mirrors, located on the opposite wall. Because the original photos were damaged beyond repair, the collage was recomposed with similar images by Bert Griepink in 2019. The fifth artwork, Wonen is geen gunst maar een recht by Tine Hofman, was added to the station in 1997. The name of the artwork ("Living is not a favour but a right") is written on the platform floor with tiles. Hofman herself lived in the neighbourhood and protested against the metro, inspiring her to create the work. The tiles are deliberately placed on the floor to convey the feeling "that we have been walked over".

In 2012, it was announced that the wrecking ball and the photo collage, as well as a few other artworks in different stations, were planned to be removed during the upcoming renovation as they were damaged. In the end, the decision was made to keep them because of their "cultural-historical value".

== Services ==
The station is served by metro lines 51, 53 and 54. North-bound, all three lines share the same route and terminate at Amsterdam Centraal. South-bound, M51 ends at Isolatorweg, M53 ends at Gaasperplas, and M54 ends at Gein. As of 2026, all lines run 6 trains per hour everyday, with the exception of the early morning and late evening when service is reduced to 4 trains per hour. There are no connections to other forms of transport available at the station.
