= Waterlooplein metro station =

Metro station in Amsterdam

Waterlooplein
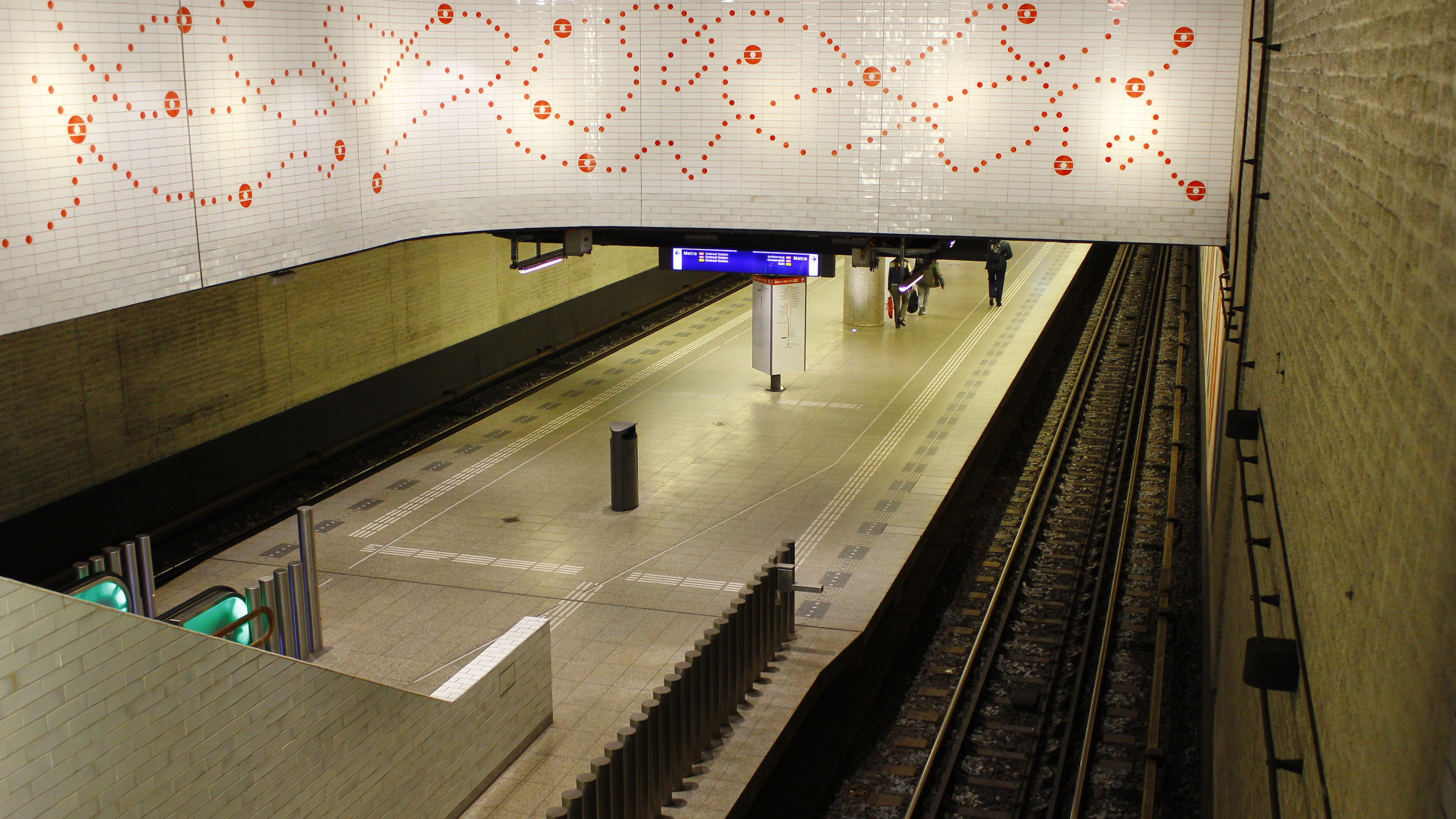

General information
- Location: Waterlooplein, Amsterdam, Netherlands
- Coordinates: 52°22′02″N 4°54′06″E
- Owner: GVB
- Line: 51, 53, 54 (Metro)
- Platforms: 1
- Tracks: 2
- Connections: GVB tram: 14; GVB bus: N85, N87, N89, N91, N93 (night)

Other information
- Fare zone: 5700 (Centrum)

History
- Opened: 11 October 1980

Services
Preceding station	Amsterdam Metro	Following station
Nieuwmarkt towards Centraal Station	Line 51	Weesperplein towards Isolatorweg
Nieuwmarkt towards Centraal Station	Line 53	Weesperplein towards Gaasperplas
Nieuwmarkt towards Centraal Station	Line 54	Weesperplein towards Gein
Location

Waterlooplein is an underground metro station in the city centre of Amsterdam, Netherlands. Served by metro lines 51, 53 and 54 of the Amsterdam Metro, the station was constructed by sinking caissons with a length of 40 metres (130 ft), with the first one being lowered in 1972. There were "open tube" days in 1975 showcasing the station, which was the first time the public got access to the underground tunnels of the metro system.

The station, opened to metro traffic on 11 October 1980, has an island platform of 180 metres (590 ft) and two halls with a total of five entrances. Waterlooplein, along with other stations on the East Line, had a major renovation in 2016 that brought back the brutalist architecture used in the original station. There are two pieces of artwork located in the station: one in a station hall and the other on the platform level.

== Layout ==
Waterlooplein and other metro stations on the East Line were designed by two architects from the Government of Amsterdam: Ben Spängberg and Sier van Rhijn. It has an island platform of 180 metres (590 ft) long and 8 metres (26 ft) wide, located 12 metres (39 ft) under the surface. Each end of the platform goes up to its own hall, with a total of five entrances into the station. Four entrances lead up to the square of the same name, two of which go to the Stopera—the town hall of Amsterdam—while the fifth entrance is located at the Nieuwe Herengracht. There are columns in the middle of the platform, roughly 7 metres (23 ft) apart from each other. A restaurant serving Surinamese food is located inside the station. Between Waterlooplein station and Weesperplein, the line makes a turn as the following curve from Nieuwmarkt to Amsterdam Centraal would have been too tight otherwise.

== History ==
=== Construction and opening ===
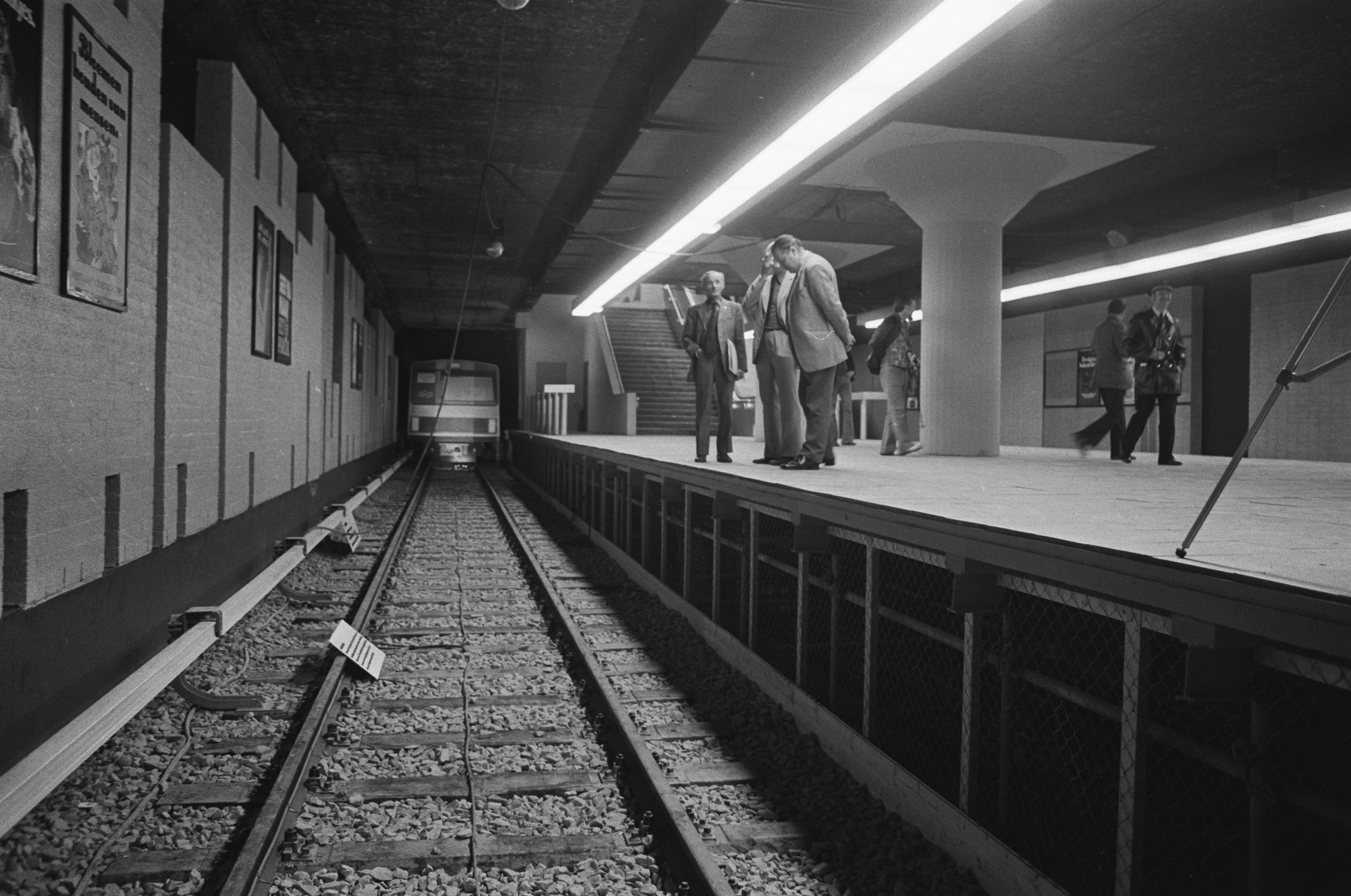
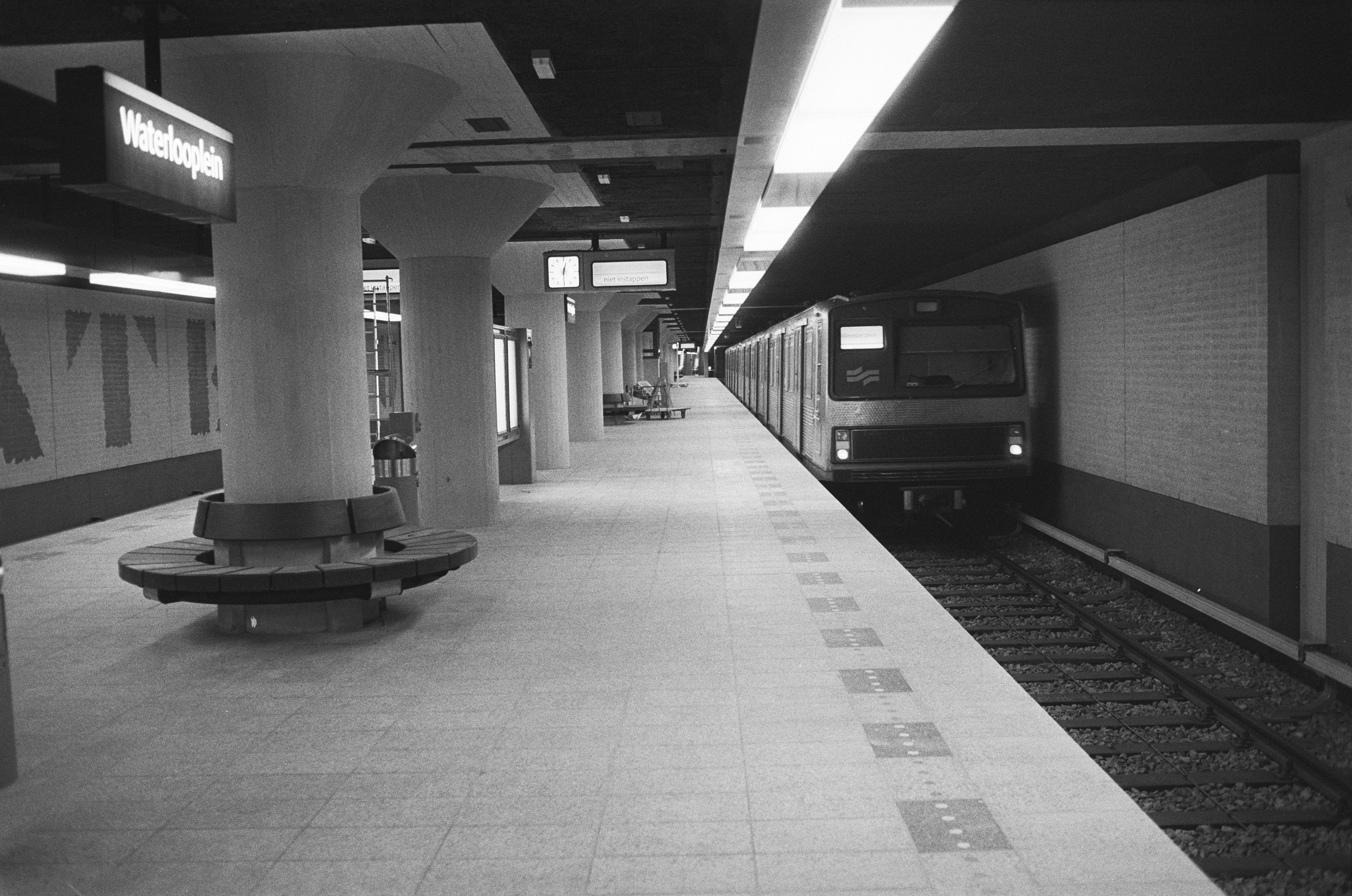
Alderman Han Lammers inspecting the station in 1975 (left) and the platform a week before its opening (right)

In a 1968 metro plan released by the information office of the municipality, the station was called Stadhuis instead of Waterlooplein. In 1970, it was announced that the market organized above on the square would be able to continue despite the construction. Work on the new town hall of the city commenced just before the station.

Most underground areas of the line were constructed by using caissons, which made pumping out groundwater unnecessary. The caissons were built above ground on-site, and had a length of 40 metres (130 ft) and a width of 10–18 metres (33–59 ft). The earth below the caissons were rinsed with water and pumped out, lowering them into their place. There were protests against the construction of the metro, as this method required the demolition of the houses above the line. The resistance at Waterooplein was limited as the neighbourhood had been in a decline. Many of its residents were deported and later killed during World War II, leaving a significant amount of the houses around the square in a bad condition.

Work around the area started in February 1971. The first caisson at Waterlooplein was lowered in January 1972, which immediately resulted in delays as it hit a previously unknown wall 8 metres (26 ft) under ground dating back to the 16th century. Several oak revetments of the Amstel river were found during construction, causing more delays to the lowering of the caissons. From August to October 1975, an "open tube" event was organized inside the station, which was the first time that locals were able to see what the metro system of the city would look like. The section of the tunnel from Waterlooplein to Amsterdam Centraal was opened on 11 October 1980.

=== Later developments ===
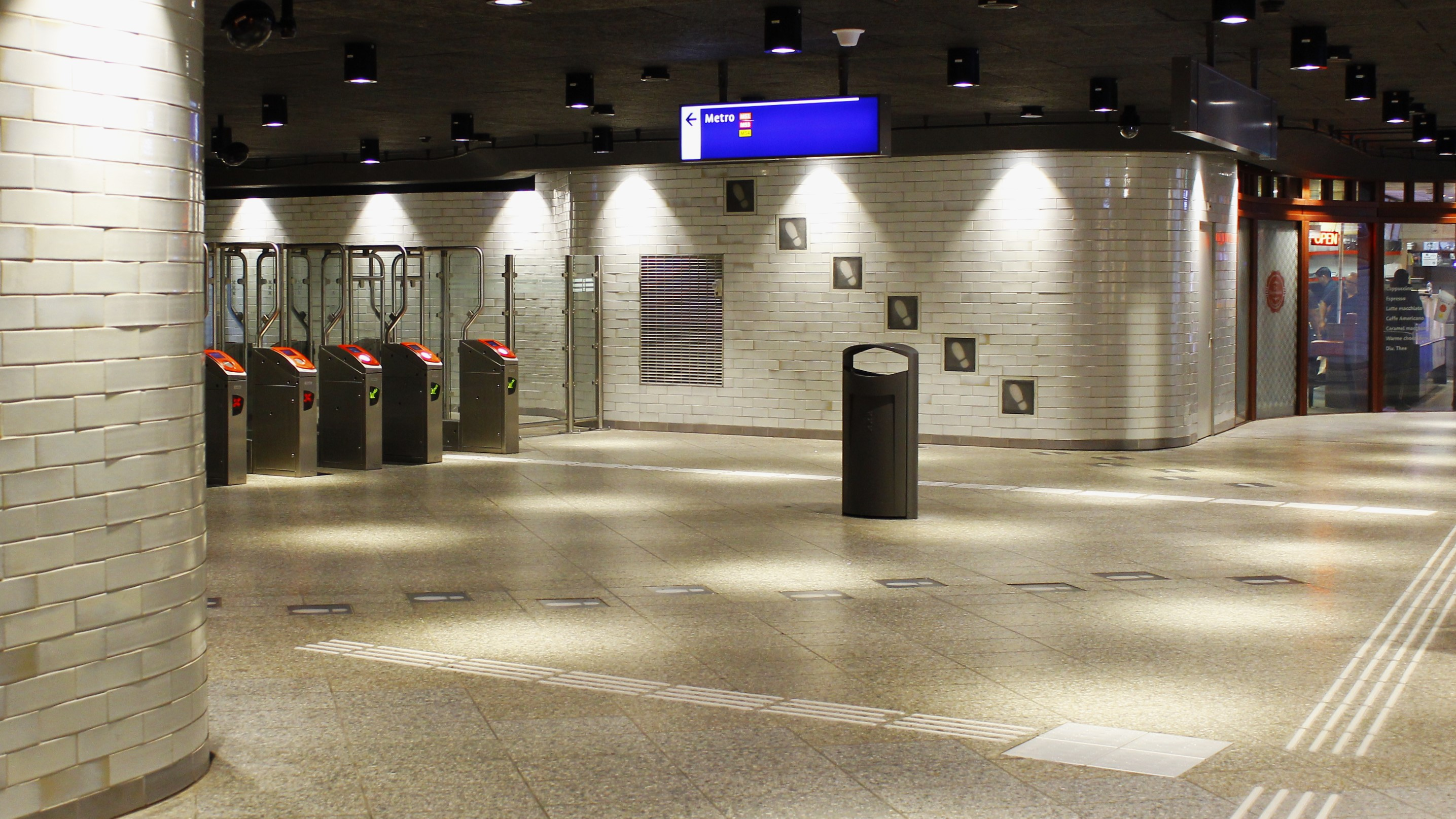
The northern entrance after the 2016 renovation

The station was renovated in 2004 together with Reigersbos as part of the Neat & Tidy project. Another renovation was planned to happen from March to September 2011. The start was delayed several times and eventually started after May. Metro traffic was stopped on 23 July, in accordance with the plan, and restarted on 5 September while the work was still ongoing.

All stations on the East Line were set for another renovation in 2016. The renovation of Waterlooplein commenced in September. The architect of the renovation wanted to revert to the brutalist architecture used in the original station design. Paint on the walls were removed to reveal the bare concrete. Metro traffic still continued as entrances were closed one by one. Some of the features added after initial construction, such as the usage of primary colours and a black ceiling, were kept after the renovation. Windows were created at two of the entrances. Cables, cable ducts and pipes were concealed for tidiness. Het Parool wrote that after the renovation the station "suddenly looked as if it was not only a part of the past but also a part of the present". GVB started to play music through the speakers of underground metro stations on the East Line in April 2017 as a trial to improve the experience of travellers. The type of music would depend on the time of day: slow and calming music during rush hours, and energetic music during the afternoon. After receiving mostly positive feedback, the practice of playing music was also expanded to the station of Line 52 in 2025.

== Artwork ==
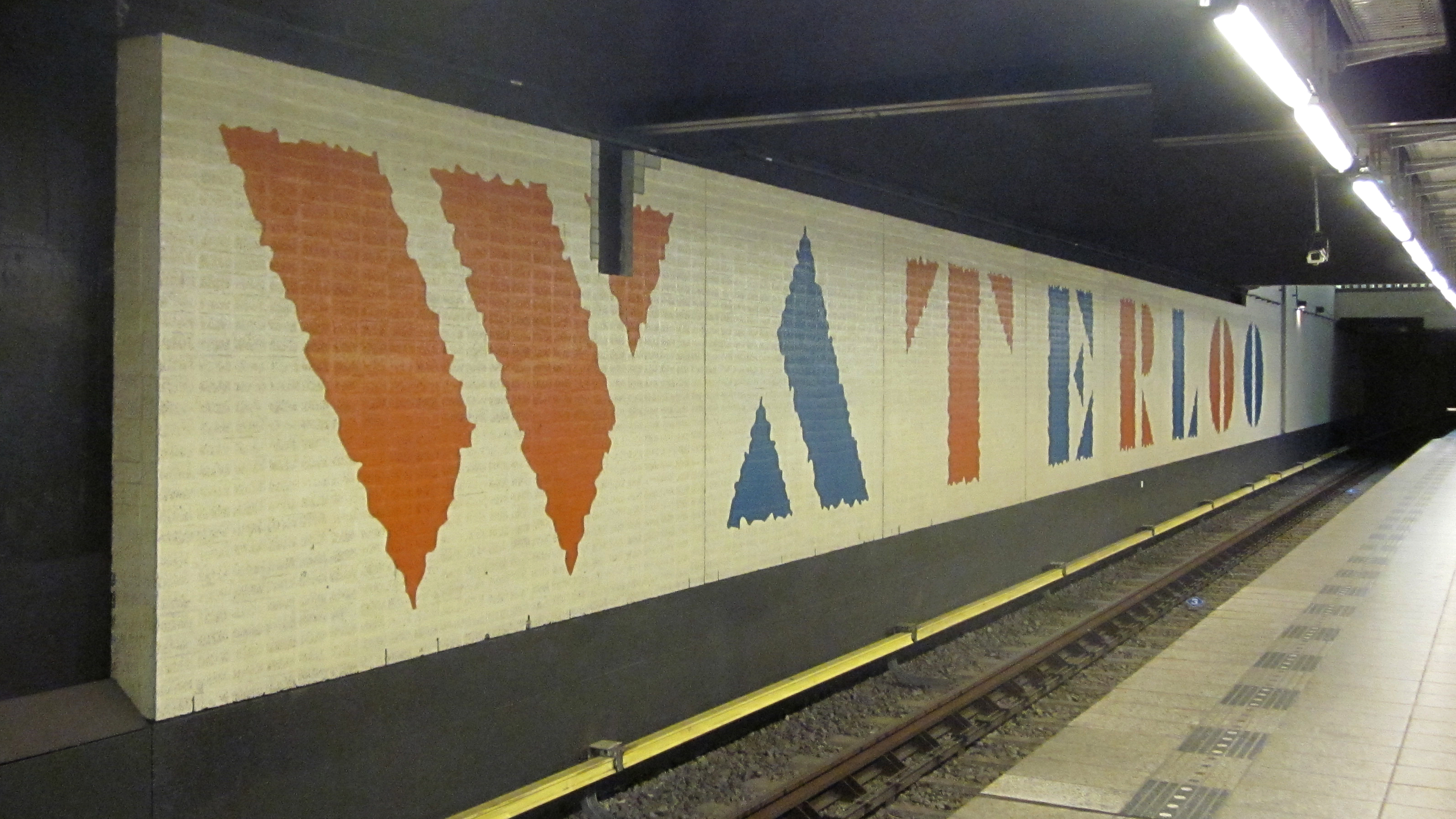
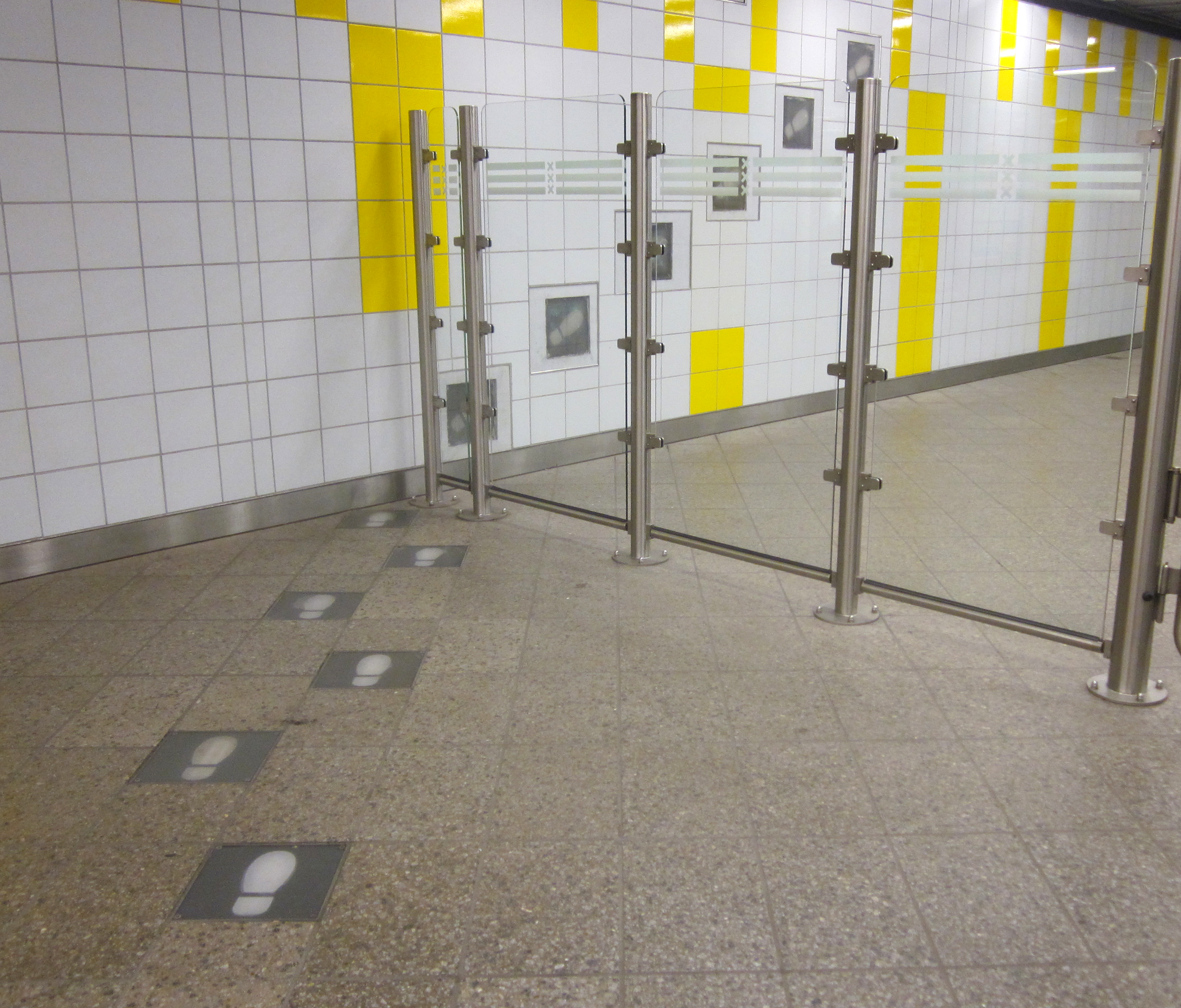
Waterloo on the platform wall (left) and Sporen van verlichte voetstappen on the floor (right) photographed in 2011, before the renovation.

Artists were invited by officials for artwork inside the stations on the East Line, with the exception of Weesperplein and Bijlmer.

Waterloo by Willem Sandberg consists of blue and red letters on the platform walls spelling out the name of the work. The typographic artwork consists of basic shapes—circles, rectangles, triangles and trapezoids—with frayed edges. The letters were planned to be removed during the 2016 renovation, as well as a few other artworks in different stations, as they were damaged. They were kept in the end due to their "cultural-historical value". Smoke screen panels were installed on the artwork to stop the spread of smoke in case of a fire. The advertisements on the walls near the letters were also removed.

Located on one of the station halls, Sporen van verlichte voetstappen by Dirk Müller is made up of several plexiglass plates of footsteps that leave a trace on the floor which continues on to a wall. The lights of the footprints illuminate one by one creating a walking motion. The footsteps were initially planned to be on Spaklerweg station, but were given to Waterlooplein due to delays with the work at Spaklerweg.

== Services ==
The station is served by metro lines 51, 53 and 54. North-bound, all three lines share the same route and terminate at Amsterdam Centraal. South-bound, M51 ends at Isolatorweg, M53 ends at Gaasperplas, and M54 ends at Gein. As of 2026, all lines run 6 trains per hour everyday, with the exception of the early morning and late evening when service is reduced to 4 trains per hour. A tram stop near the entrance shares the same name as the metro station and is served by tram line 14 during the day. At night, night buses N85, N87, N89, N91 and N93 stop near the station.
