= Rembrandt House Museum =

Historic house and art museum in Amsterdam in the Netherlands

The Rembrandt House Museum
- Museum Het Rembrandthuis
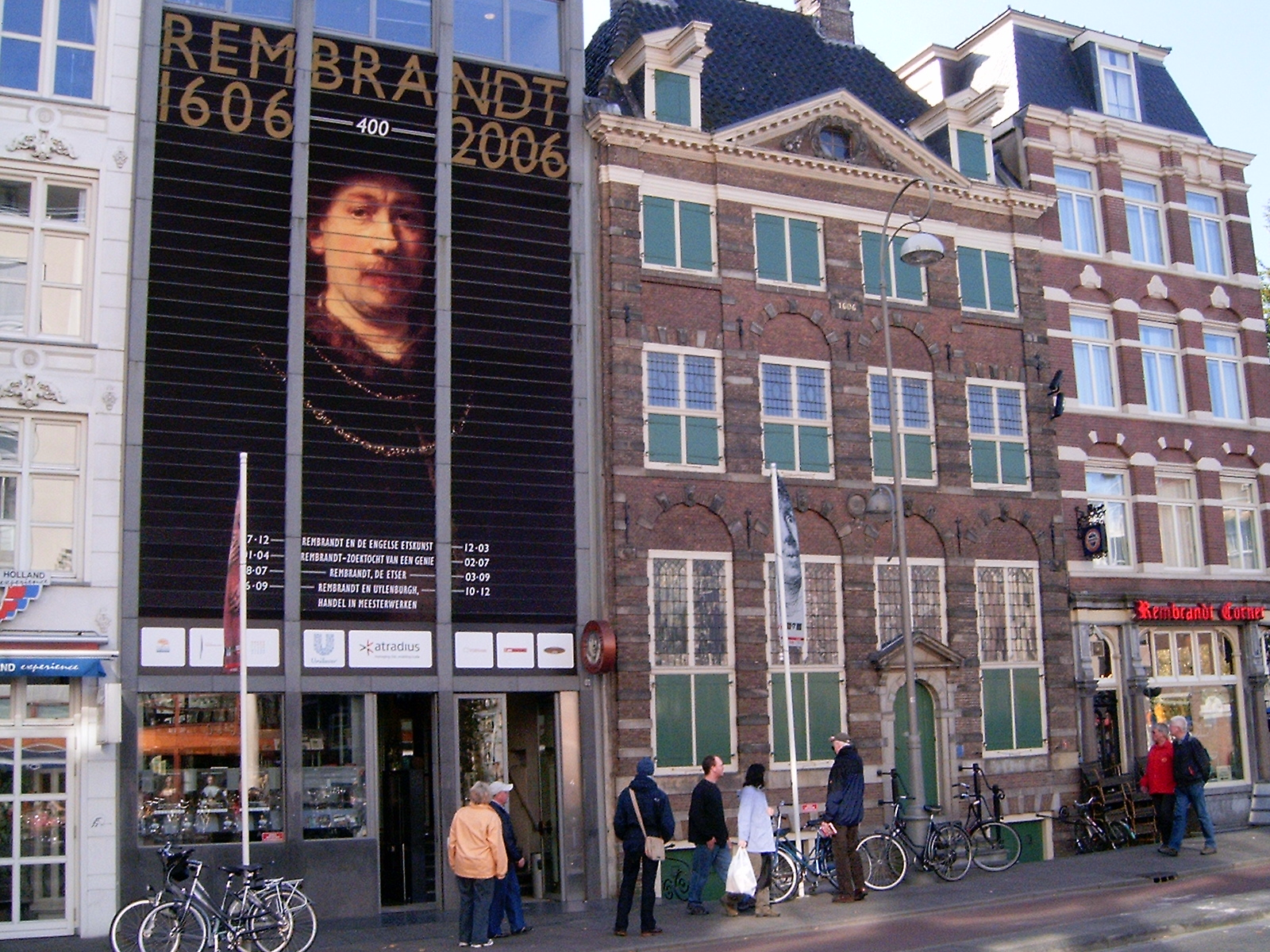
- Rembrandt House Museum in 2006

- Location of the museum in the centre of Amsterdam
- Established: 10 June 1911
- Location: Jodenbreestraat 4 Amsterdam, Netherlands
- Coordinates: 52°22′9.85″N 4°54′4.63″E
- Type: Biographical museum
- Collections: Pre-Rembrandtists; Rembrandt's etchings
- Visitors: 226,304 (2023)
- Director: Milou Halbesma
- Curators: Epco Runia, David de Witt, Leonore van Sloten, Nathalie Maciesza
- Public transit access: Waterlooplein/Nieuwmarkt; Tram: 9 14; Metro: 51 53 54
- Website: www.rembrandthuis.nl

The Rembrandt House Museum (Dutch: Museum Het Rembrandthuis) is a museum located in a former house in the Jodenbreestraat, in the center of Amsterdam. Between 1639 and 1658, the house was occupied by the Dutch painter Rembrandt van Rijn, who also had his studio and art dealership there. The museum now includes the house next door, which has the museum shop and more conventional gallery spaces.

The house was built around 1606 and was renovated around 1627, probably under the supervision of Jacob van Campen. It was then given an extra floor and a new facade with a triangular pediment. Rembrandt bought it on 5 January 1639 for thirteen thousand guilders. After his bankruptcy it was auctioned in 1658 and sold for eleven thousand guilders. In the following centuries it was used as a residence and was renovated several times.

At the beginning of the 20th century, the building was in poor condition, and on the occasion of the Rembrandt Year in 1906, it was purchased in 1907 by the municipality of Amsterdam, which donated it to the Rembrandthuis foundation. Between 1907 and 1911 the house was restored by Karel de Bazel. The museum was opened on 10 June 1911. Queen Wilhelmina and Prince Hendrik were the first visitors. The Rembrandt House Museum owes its foundation to an initiative by the painter Jozef Israëls.

Since 2008, the museum had around 200,000 visitors per year, with a record number of over 280,000 visitors in 2019.

== Rembrandt's house ==
The museum shows Rembrandt's living and working quarters, including his living room, art room and the studio where he created his masterpieces. The building was redesigned in the 20th century on the basis of the inventory that was drawn up during Rembrandt's bankruptcy in 1656. This gives the visitor an idea of Rembrandt's daily life, his studio practice and what a private house and artist's studio looked like in the 17th century. In Rembrandt's old house there are also works of art from the 17th century, including by Rembrandt's teacher Pieter Lastman and his pupils Ferdinand Bol and Govert Flinck.

== Collection ==
The Rembrandt House Museum owns an almost complete collection of etchings by Rembrandt, as well as some of his original copper plates. These are regularly displayed in the etching cabinet and in temporary exhibitions in the modern museum wing.

The museum has a good collection of paintings from the period, but the Rembrandt paintings are mostly from early in his career. Since Rembrandt used the house for his own collection of works by others, and as a gallery for his career as an art dealer, this is believed to reflect well its appearance while he lived there.

In 2019, material-technical research showed that two pots ('grapes') found in 1997 in Rembrandt's cesspool were in fact used by the artist. One of the pots contains remnants of quartz soil. This is a mixture of quartz and clay with which Rembrandt prepared his canvases before painting. Leonore van Sloten, curator of Museum Het Rembrandthuis, said about this in the newspaper Het Parool: "Rembrandt started using so-called quartz soil from the moment he lived in what is now the museum, and as far as we know is the only one who this did. A mixture of quartz and clay was probably convenient for him from a practical and financial point of view." The two pots are on display in the museum.

In 2021, The Rembrandt House Museum received a painting from Mr. and Mrs. Hoogsteder to support the museum during the Covid crisis. The new acquisition is the painting Shepherdess in a Landscape from c. 1641, made by Ferdinand Bol, one of Rembrandt's most famous pupils. The painting hangs in Rembrandt's former living room and bedroom.

In 2022, the museum purchased four contemporary works of art by Natasja Kensmil and Milan Gies. The museum also owns contemporary art by (amongst others) Marlene Dumas, Reinder Homan, Iriée Zamblé and Timothy Voges.

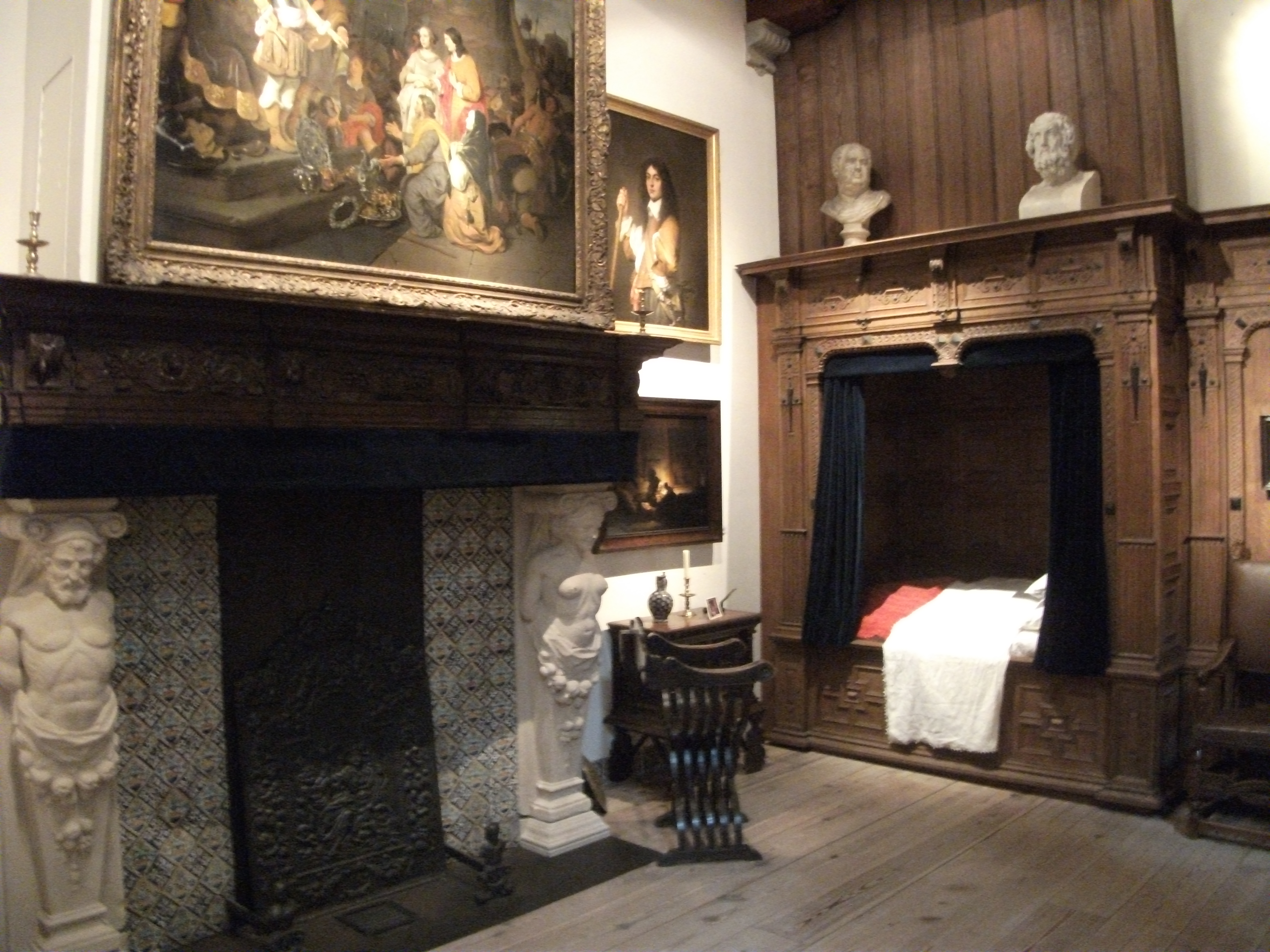
Bed-sitting room. The 17th-century bed did not belong to Rembrandt, but is similar to the original.

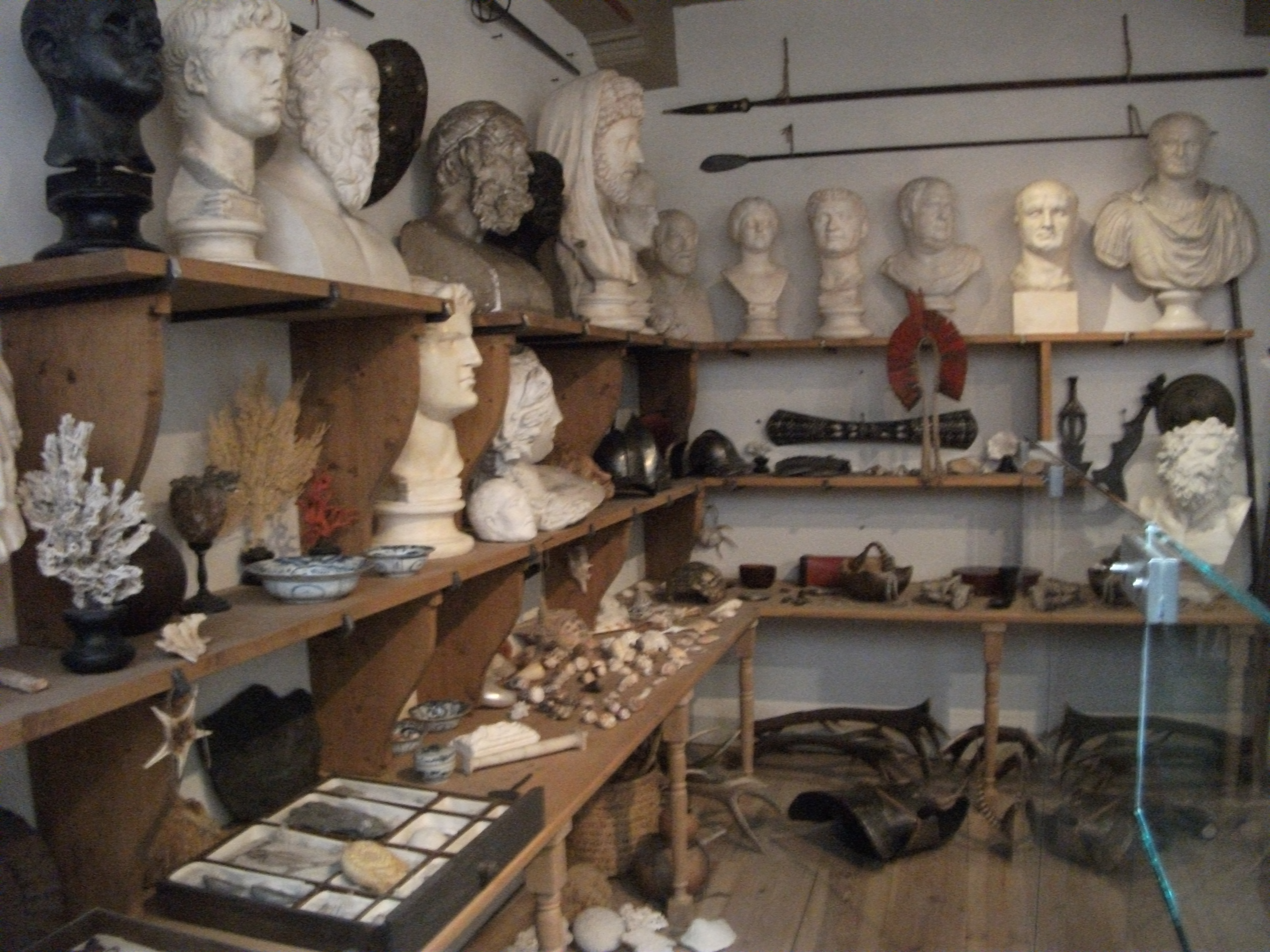
Rembrandt's collection room recreated

== Exhibitions ==
Year	Visitors	Year	Visitors
2008	221,888	2012	190,992
2009	182,528	2013	220,263
2010	200,265	2014	237,383
2011	200,450	2015	

The modern museum wing hosts temporary exhibitions throughout the year with works of art by Rembrandt, his contemporaries and his (contemporary) followers. During the national Rembrandt Year in 2019, The Rembrandt House Museum showed three exhibitions: Rembrandt's Social Network, Inspired by Rembrandt and Laboratory Rembrandt. Other high-profile exhibits were Peter Vos: Metamorphosis (2016), Rembrandt's Naked Truth (2016), Glenn Brown (2017), Govert Flinck and Ferdinand Bol (2017–2018), HERE. Black in Rembrandt's time (2020), Hansken, Rembrandt's Elephant (2021), RAW (2022), Framing Rembrandt (2023–2024), Directed by: Rembrandt (2024), Rembrandt & the World (2024), The Illusionist: Samuel van Hoogstraten (2025), Rembrandt & Amsterdam (2025), THUIS. The Feeling of Home in Contemporary Art (2025–2026) and Rembrandt & Life (2026).

The 2025 exhibition Rembrandt & Amsterdam marked the city's 750th anniversary, presenting the city through Rembrandt's etchings of its people and streets. Rembrandt & Life (2026) followed with over fifty etchings tracing human life from cradle to grave, closing with two paintings in a "treasure chamber": the fragmentary Anatomy Lesson of Dr Jan Deijman (1656), on loan from the Amsterdam Museum, and the oil sketch Joseph Interpreting His Dreams (1633), on long-term loan from the Rijksmuseum. Since 2023 the museum has also run an annual Rembrandt Open Studio residency, inviting contemporary artists to make new work in the house.

== See also ==
- List of single-artist museums
