= Nieuwmarkt =

Square in Amsterdam, Netherlands

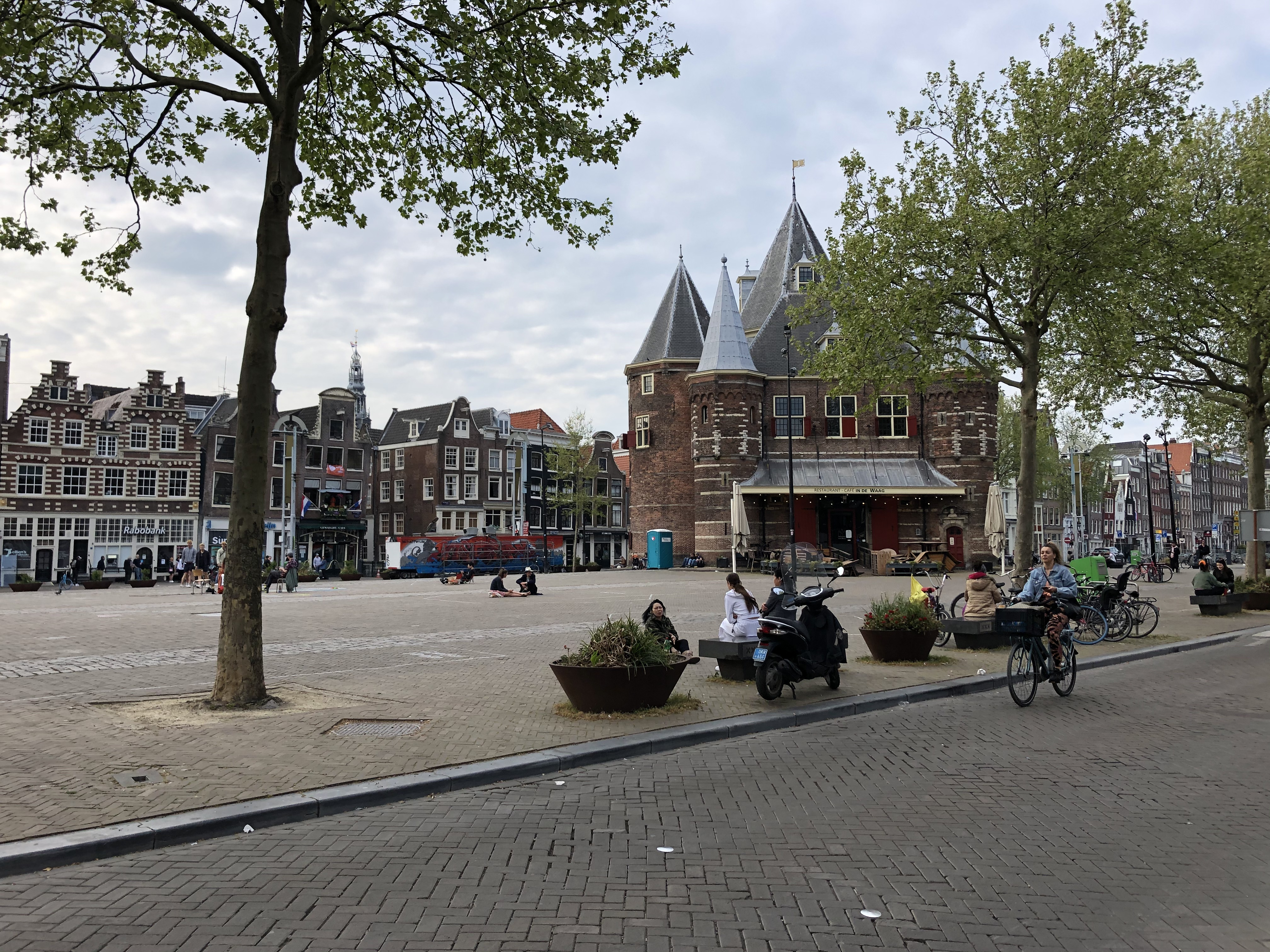
- The square with the Waag in 2020

- Location within Amsterdam
- Location: Centrum, Amsterdam, Netherlands
- Nearest metro station: Nieuwmarkt
- Coordinates: 52°22′21″N 4°54′02″E

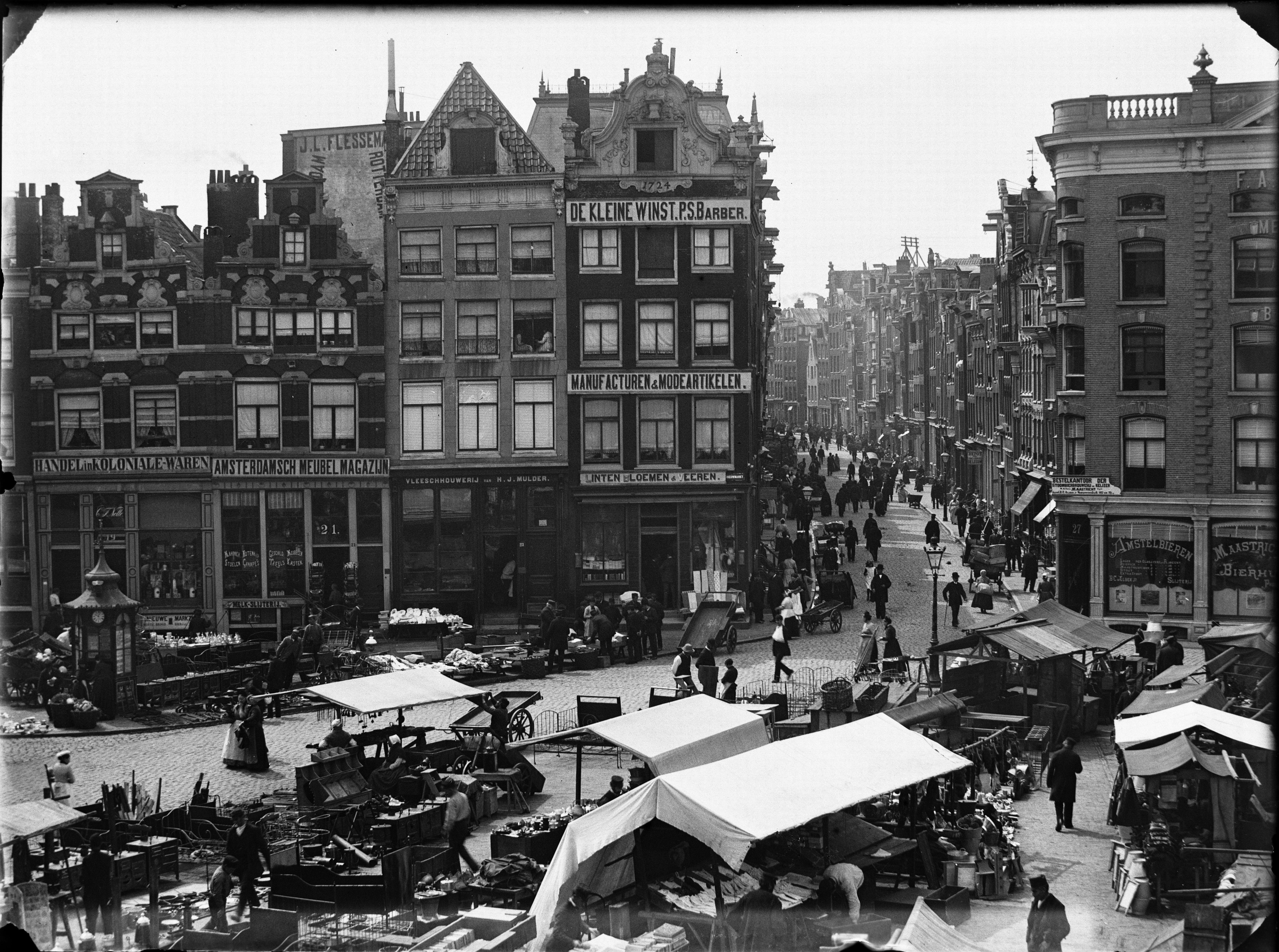
Nieuwmarkt in 1890

Nieuwmarkt (Dutch pronunciation: [ˈniuˌmɑr(ə)kt]; English: New Market) is a square in the centre of Amsterdam, Netherlands. The surrounding area is known as the Lastage neighborhood. It is situated in the borough of Amsterdam-Centrum.

The square is considered part of Amsterdam's Chinatown, next to the De Wallen (Red Light District). There are over 20 cafés and coffeeshops facing the square. There is a daily market on the square, as well as an organic food market on Saturdays and a market for antiques and books on Sundays in the summer months.

The Nieuwmarkt is dominated by a building known as the Waag, originally a gate in the medieval city walls but converted into a weighing house after the walls were demolished in the 17th century. The square was created when the canals around the Waag were filled in 1614, and was used as a marketplace (hence the name). In World War II the square was used by the Nazis as a collection point for Jews who had been rounded up to be sent to the concentration camps.

In the 1970s many buildings on and around the square were torn down to make way for a planned metro and four-lane highway, which was to run right through the Nieuwmarkt neighbourhood. This led to heavy rioting, known as the Nieuwmarkt Riots (Nieuwmarktrellen), in 1975 and, ultimately, abandonment of the highway plans. The metro, however, was constructed, and Nieuwmarkt is now a station on the Amsterdam metro (subway) system.
