= Vijzelgracht =

Canal in Amsterdam

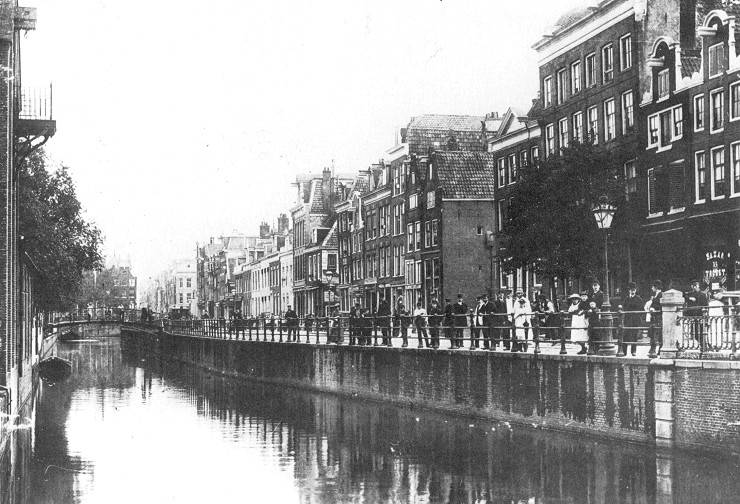
- The Vijzelgracht around 1930, shortly before being filled in 1933

- Location within Amsterdam
- Location: Amsterdam
- Postal code: 1017
- Coordinates: 52.360833°N 4.891111°E
- North end: Lijnbaansgracht
- To: Prinsengracht

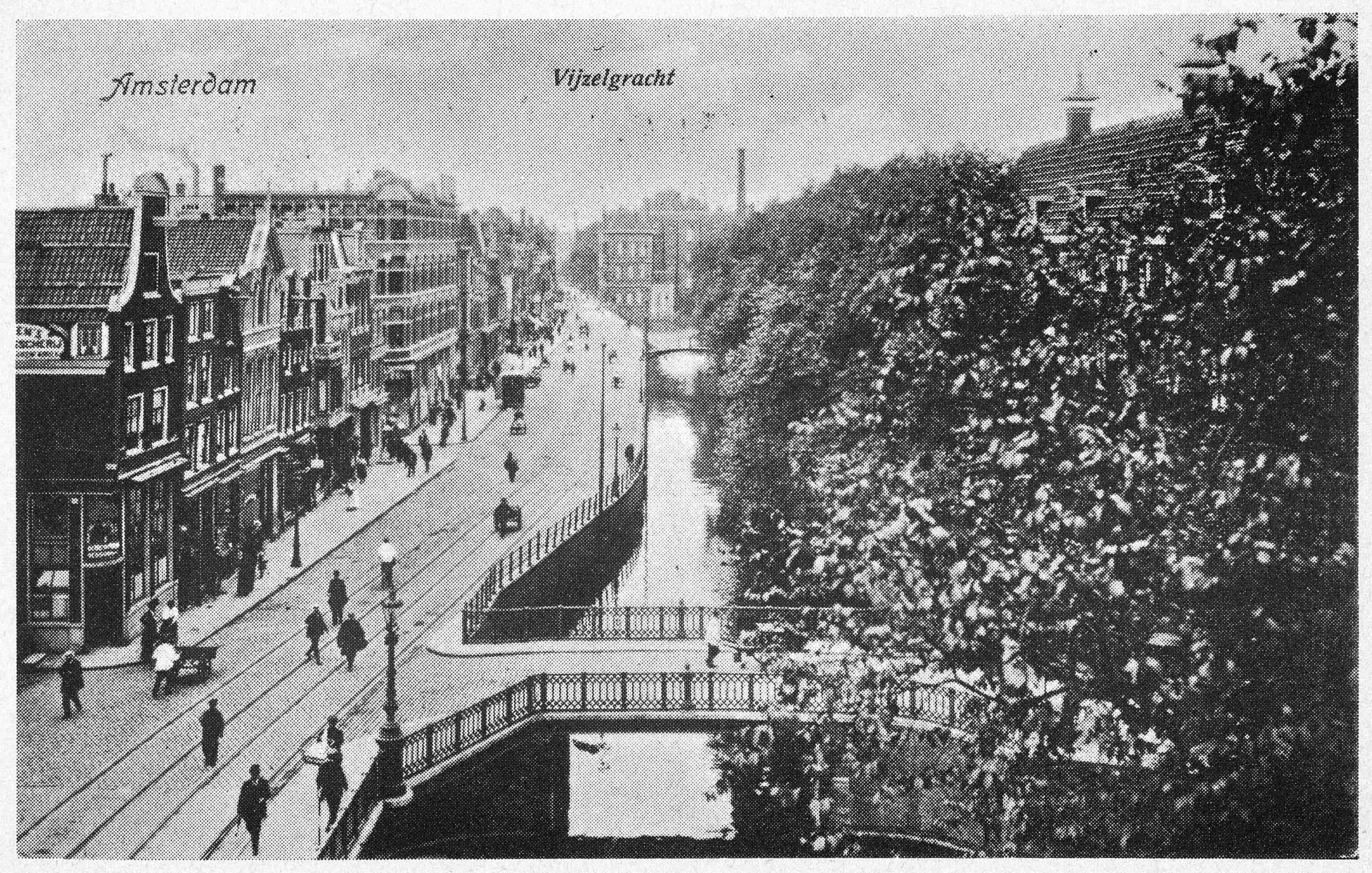
The Vijzelgracht from the Prinsengracht, circa 1900, with two missing bridges

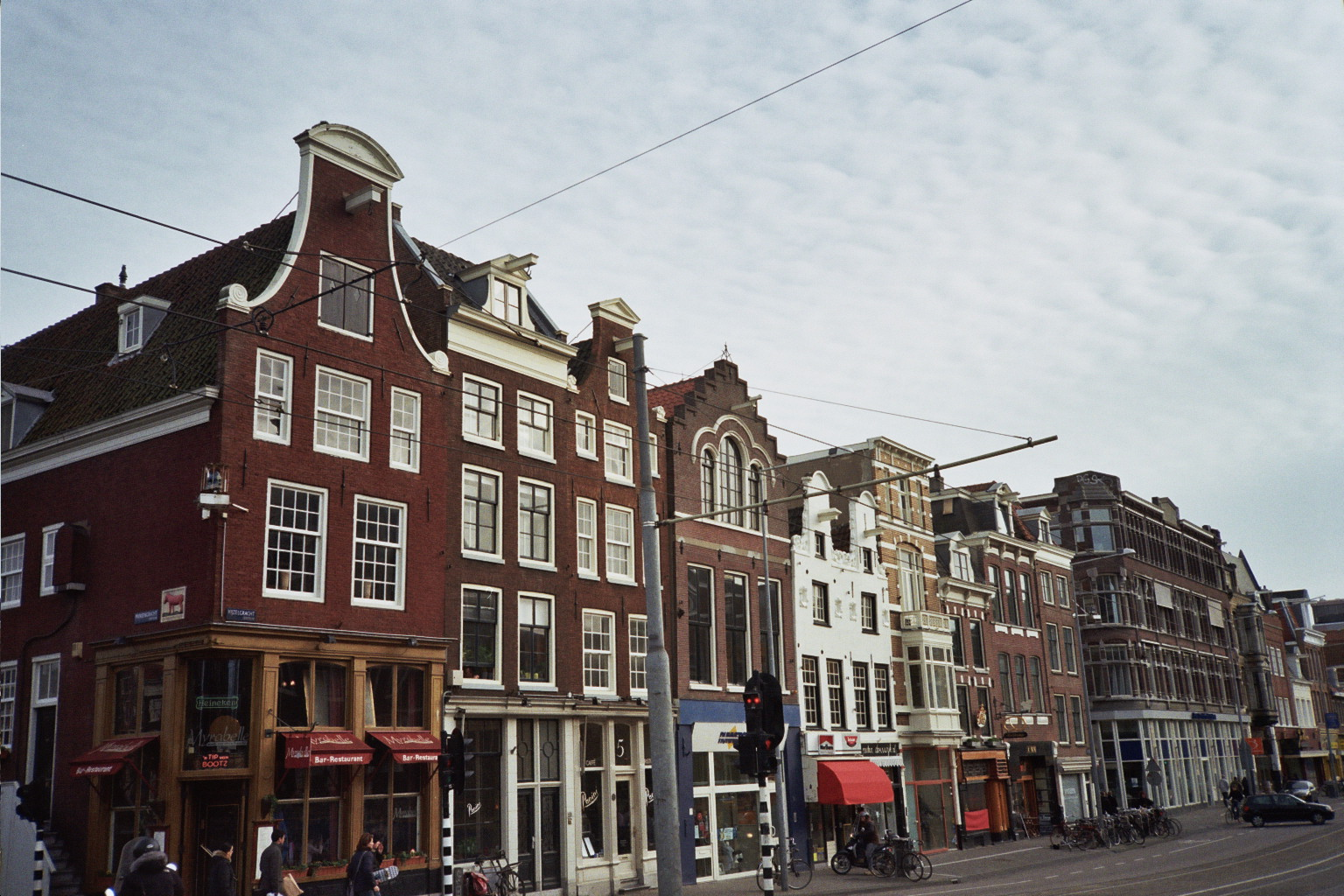
Properties on Vijzelgracht 1, 3, 5, etc. seen from the Prinsengracht

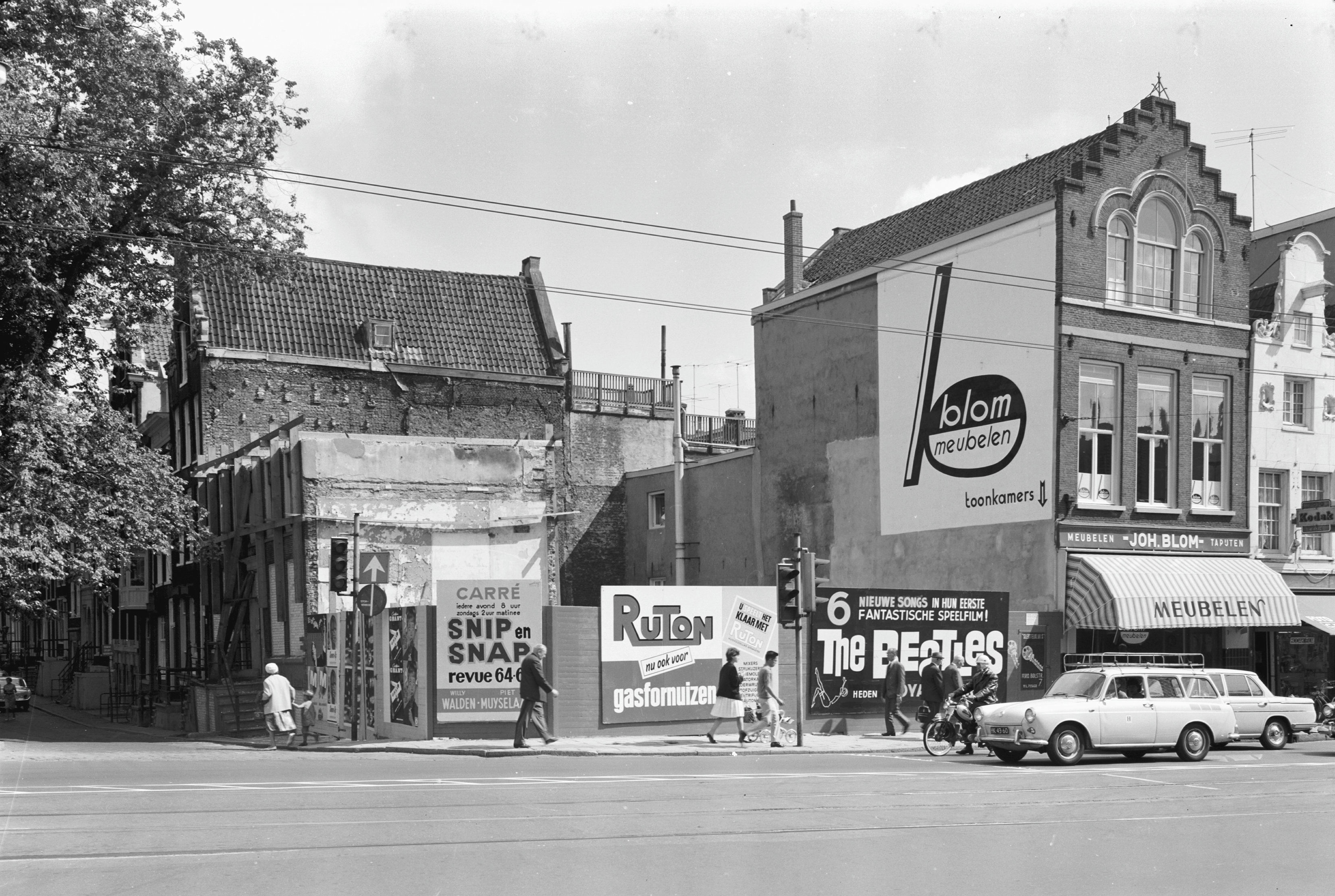
The same corner in 1964, after demolition of the original buildings and before rebuilding in the old state

The Vijzelgracht is a street and former canal in Amsterdam. The Vijzelgracht is adjacent to the Grachtengordel (canal belt) and is an extension of one of the most important city radii for public transport and normal traffic. This through route leads via Vijzelstraat, Rokin, Dam Square and Damrak to Central Station. To the south of Vijzelgracht, the Nieuwe Vijzelstraat connects to Weteringschans.

== History ==
The Vijzelgracht dates from the time of the major expansion of Amsterdam in 1658. A 1737 map of Amsterdam by Gerrit de Broen shows the canal starting from the Baan Graft (Lijnbaansgracht) just east of the Molen de Weetering (Wetering Mill) on the city wall ramparts. The short canal ran north to Prince Graft (Prinsengracht). The street to the east of the canal (Vijzelstraat) continued north to the Cingel (Singel) just past the point where the Amstel split into the Singel and the Rokin. The canal and street are most likely named for the 17th-century residents Cornelis and Jan Vijselaar, although the name was only made official in 1874.

The canal is shown on the 1662 map by Daniël Stalpaert, with some houses already built along the streets leading to the east and west. The area around the Vijzelsgracht in the 1670s was called "Noortse Bosch". Many of the small houses were built for wool combers, spinners and weavers. The city wanted to stimulate the textile industry, and made the land available to the Burgerweeshuis, Gasthuizen and Leprozenhuis. These charities built the houses and used the rent to feed and clothe their orphans and lepers. Weaver houses were also built in the adjacent Noorderstraatand Weteringbuurt, (formerly called 'Het Vlakke Veld'). In total, the neighborhood had more than 200 weaver houses at that time.

In the 17th century, on the corner with Vijzelgracht and Lijnbaansgracht, the "city street maker's yard" was surrounded by water. During the late 19th and the first half of the 20th century the buildings of the flour and bread factory "Holland" were located here. In 1933 it was decided to back-fill the canal.

Since 1883 horse trams have been driving through Vijzelstraat and Vijzelgracht. The electric tram appeared in 1904. Since then line 4 has been driving this route. Line 16 was added in 1913. Vijzelstraat was widened in 1917 and 1926, after which there was room for two new tram lines: line 24 in 1929 and a year later line 25. The route of line 4 was shifted to Utrechtsestraat in 1948. Since the lifting of tram line 25 in December 2013 and tram line 16 on July 22, 2018, only tram line 24 runs through the Nieuwe Vijzelstraat, Vijzelgracht and Vijzelstraat.

== Monuments ==
The Vijzelgracht has a number of national and municipal monuments. To mention are:

- At Vijzelgracht 2a there is the 17th-century Walloon orphanage designed by architect Adriaan Dortsman (1636–82). The orphanage was established on Vijzelgracht since 1683 and remained in use as such until 1967. Since 1971, the Maison Descartes and the Consulate of France have been based in the Orphanage.
- The monumental weaver houses, on Vijzelgracht from number 20, were built between August 1670 and March 1671. The design of the weaver houses is by architect Philips Vingboons (1607–78).
- The buildings are built according to a fixed pattern: a living cellar, a first floor, a kitchen at the back with basement and a first floor with a hood. The looms were on the first floor, the spinners worked in the basement. The corner houses were larger and served as a store or a pub.
- The monumental building Vijzelgracht 63 is of historical architectural importance because it incorporates different styles. The building was designed by architect D. van Oort Hzn. He also designed the municipal monument Vijzelgracht 49.
- The building at number 63 was restored in 2002 by Stadsherstel Amsterdam. The foundation was also replaced in connection with the construction of the Noord / Zuidlijn. There is a business space on the ground floor and there are houses on the higher floors.
- Both the office building at Vijzelgracht 50 / Lijnbaansgracht and the apartment building at the nearby Reguliersgracht / corner Falckstraat bear the name 'Het Noortse Bosch'.

== Bridges ==
The Vijzelgracht had a large number of bridges:

- Walenweeshuissluis (bridge 70), the bridge over the Prinsengracht from the Vijzelstraat (still there in 2017)
- Bridge on the southern quay of the Prinsengracht across the Vijzelgracht in front of Maison Descartes (disappeared)
- Bridges on the quays of the Vijzelgracht over the Nieuwe Looiersgracht (disappeared),
- Bridge 85, a footbridge at the Derde Weteringdwarsstraat (disappeared)
- Bridge on the quay of the Lijnbaansgracht over the Vijzelgracht (disappeared)
- Bridge 86 in the quay of the Vijzelgracht over the Lijnbaansgracht (still there in 2017)
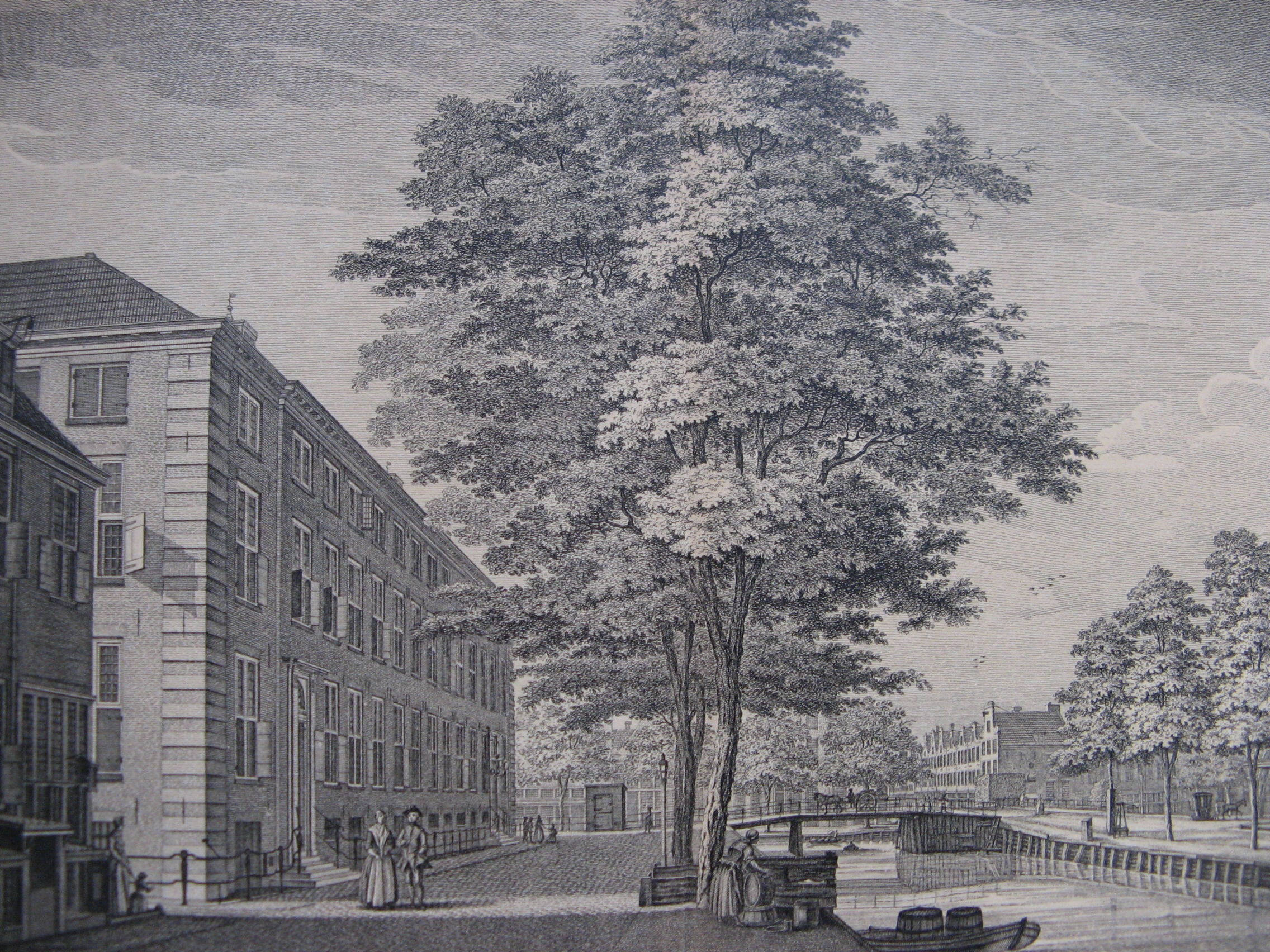
The Vijzelgracht and the Walen orphanage; circa 1780

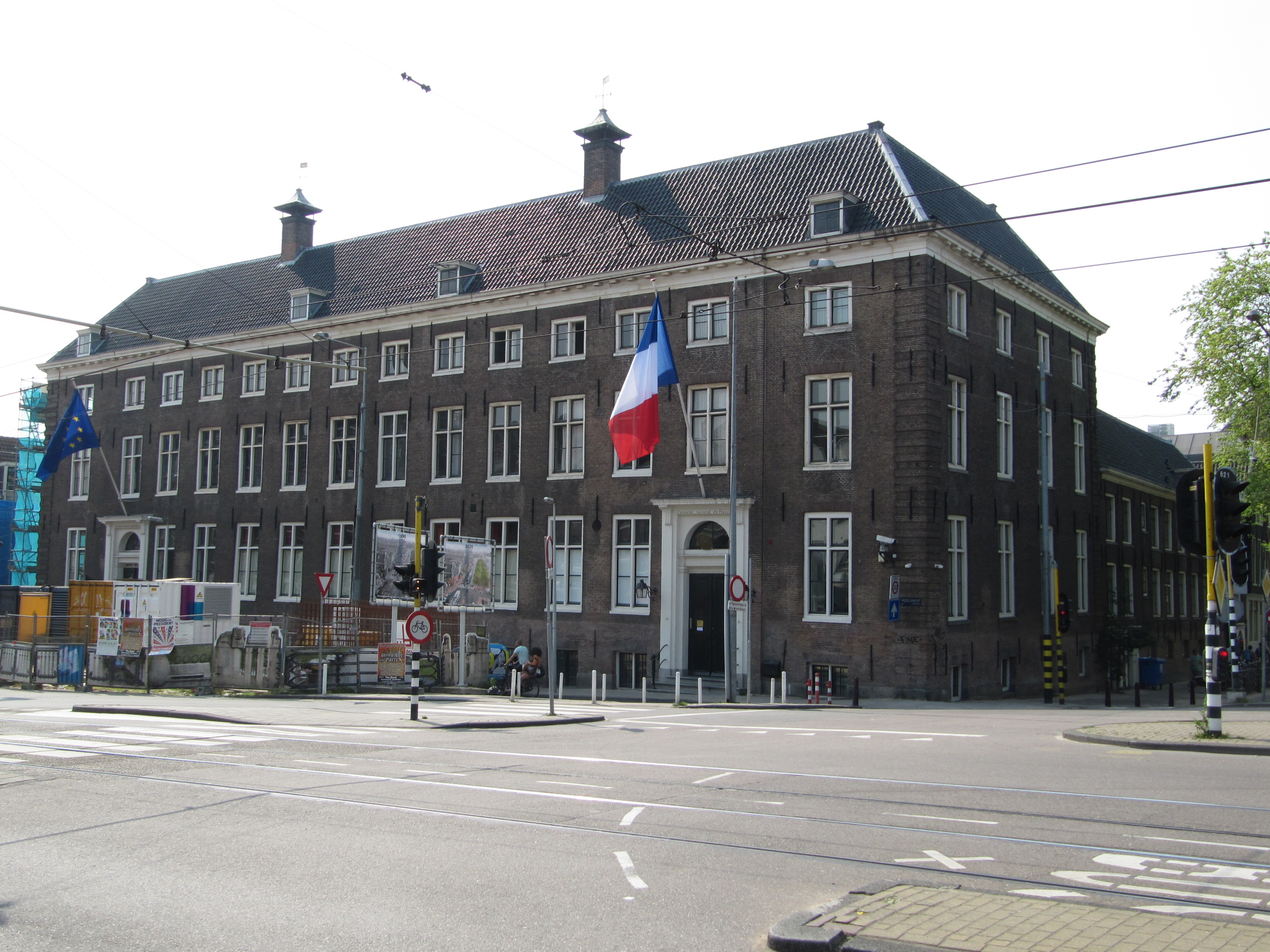
The Walen orphanage on the Vijzelgracht

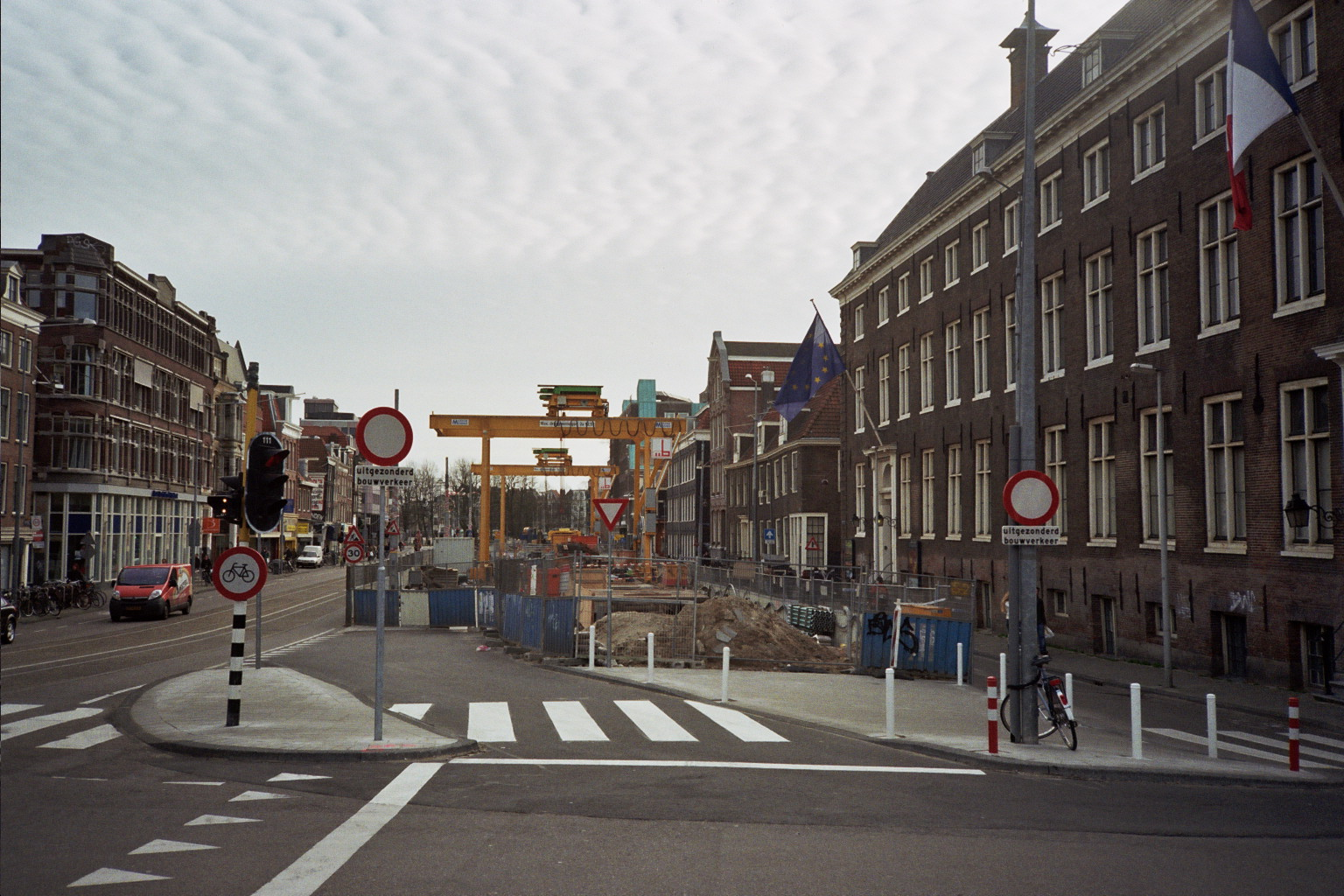
Work for the metro, on the right the Walen orphanage / 'Maison Descartes', corner Prinsengracht

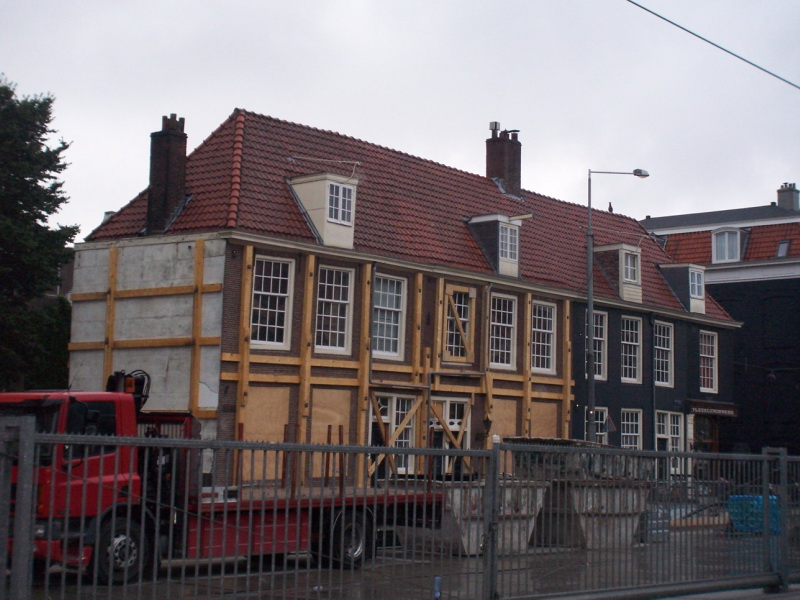
Sinked weaver houses on the Vijzelgracht in 2008.

== Construction of the North / South line ==
Work was carried out on the North / South metro line (Noord / Zuidlijn) between 2002 and 2018, and Vijzelgracht metro station is now located under Vijzelgracht. A number of residents of the Vijzelgracht suggested digging the canal again. The street was already open for construction of the station, it was argued, so the historic appearance of the canal could be restored immediately. The neighborhood committee "Vijzelgracht - Entree met Kracht" was set up by enthusiastic local residents. The Amsterdam-Centrum District Council also initially expressed a positive opinion on the return of the water. However, the Amsterdam City Council rejected the plan in April 2006, since it would be too expensive.

Construction of the Noord / Zuidlijn on the Vijzelgracht led to major problems. In October 2004, the first subsidence occurred near the Vijzelgracht when seven buildings sagged about 2.5 centimetres (0.98 in). On 19 June 2008, four monumental buildings (weaver houses) sagged 15 centimetres (5.9 in) due to a leak in the deep wall. The work was stopped on 23 June. Work on Vijzelgracht was resumed on 9 September 2008. The municipality and the project office had investigated and thought it was safe to continue working. However, the next day (10 September), buildings on Vijzelgracht began to sag again. This time, six buildings sagged as much as 23 centimetres (9.1 in) within a few hours. The cause was again a leak in a deep wall. The residents were accommodated in hotels.

In January 2009, a driver who supplied concrete for the sheet piles at Vijzelgracht station reported to the press that concrete had been used that was already hours past its shelf life. As a result, the quality of the concrete was poor and the walls brittle. In 2008, the Deltares research agency hired by the municipality of Amsterdam found 114 weak spots and a hole in the concrete sheet piles of the Vijzelgracht. According to Deltares, those weak spots were caused, among other things, by the use of bad and polluted concrete and poor reinforcement.

== See also ==
- List of streets in Amsterdam

== Sources ==
- Daniel Stalpaert (1662), Amstelodami veteris et novissimae urbis accuratissima delineatio
- Gerrit de Broen (1737), Amsterdam
- "Vijzelgracht en Uitbreiding van Amsterdam in de 17e Eeuw", IsGeschiedenis
