= Rokin metro station =

Metro station in Amsterdam, Netherlands

Rokin
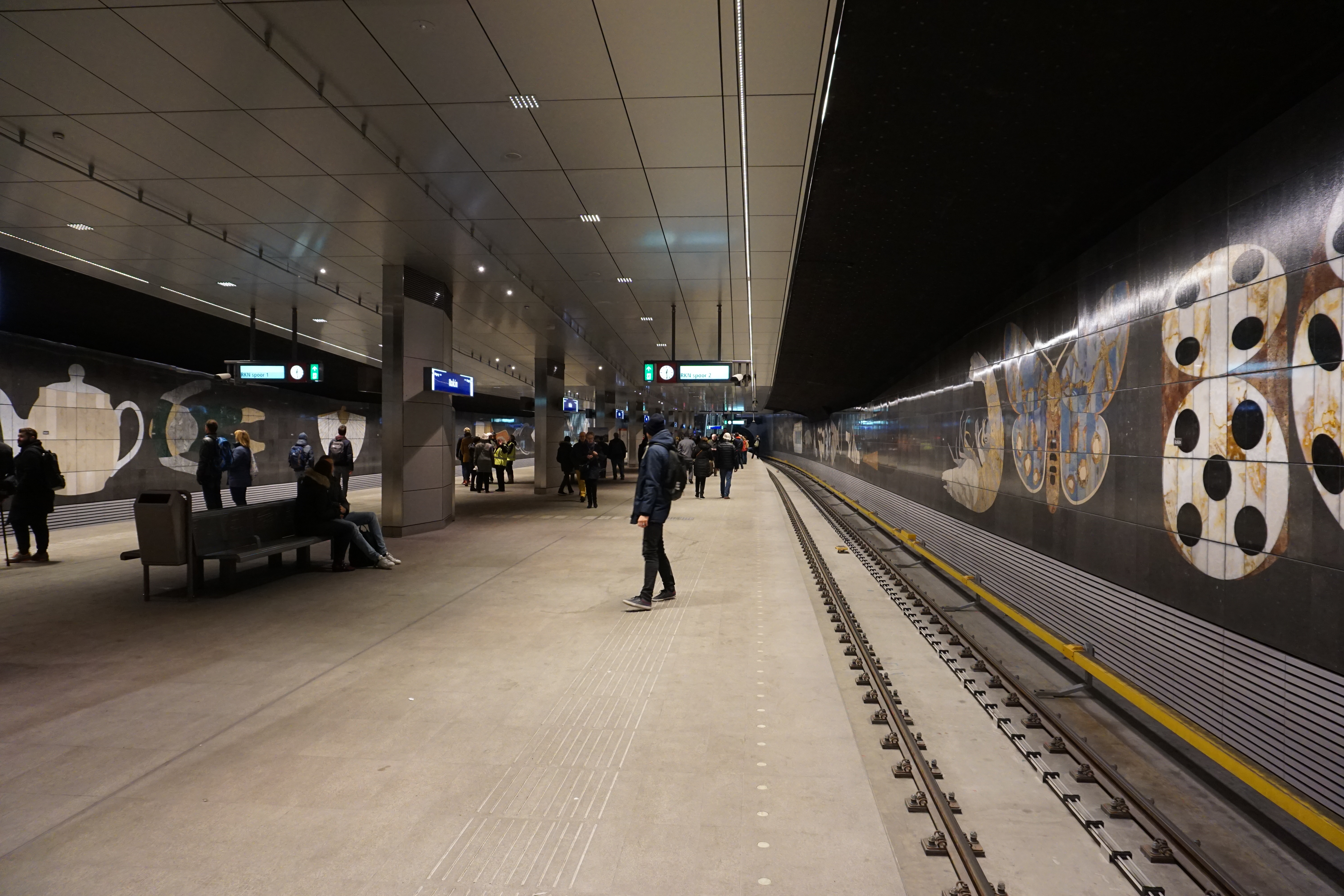
- Rokin metro station platforms

General information
- Location: Rokin, Amsterdam, Netherlands
- Coordinates: 52°22′16″N 4°53′34″E
- Owner: City of Amsterdam
- Operator: GVB
- Line: 52 (Metro)
- Platforms: 1 island platform
- Tracks: 2

Construction
- Structure type: Underground

Other information
- Station code: RKN
- Fare zone: 5700 (Centrum)

History
- Opened: 22 July 2018

Services
Preceding station	Amsterdam Metro	Following station
Centraal Station towards Noord	Line 52	Vijzelgracht towards Station Zuid
Preceding station	Amsterdam Tram	Following station
Dam towards Centraal Station	Line 4	Rembrandtplein towards Drentepark
Dam towards Centraal Station	Line 14	Rembrandtplein towards Flevopark
Location
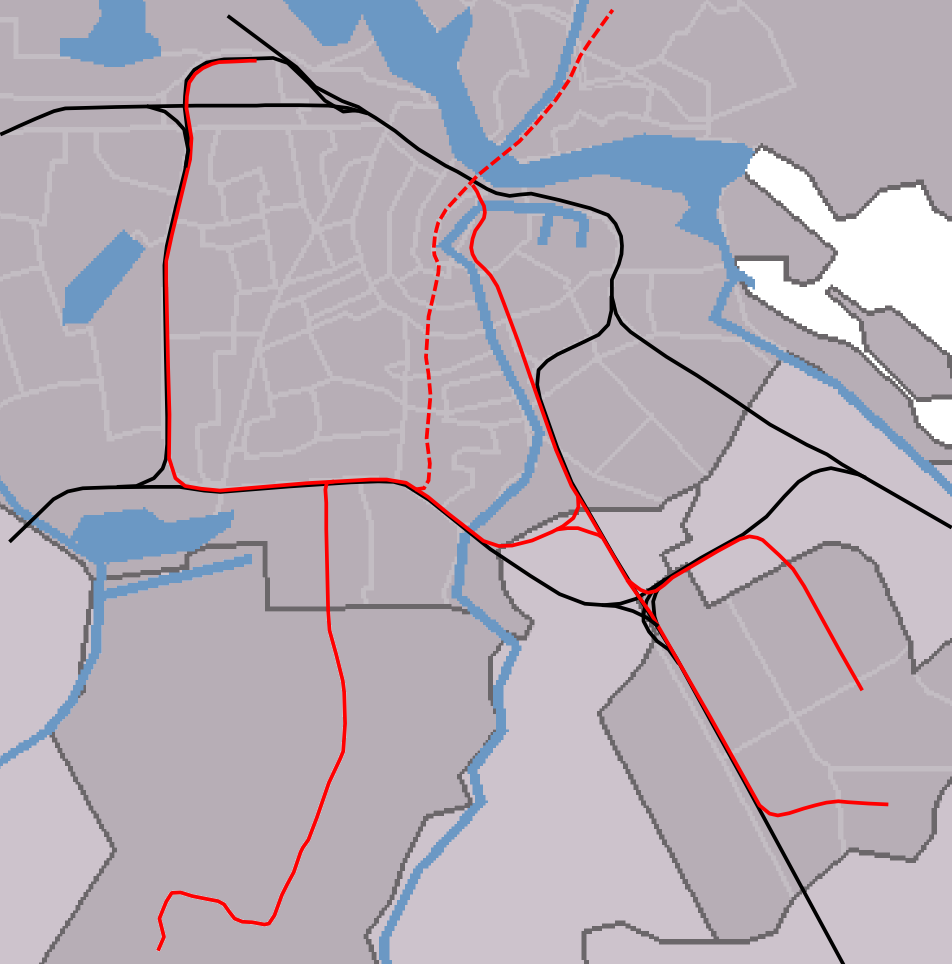
- Location within metro van Amsterdam

Rokin metro station is an Amsterdam Metro station on Line 52, the fifth and newest metro line in Amsterdam which connects the Amsterdam-Noord (north) borough to the Amsterdam-Zuid (south) via Amsterdam Centraal. It began service in July 2018 and is under the Rokin canal in Amsterdam, Netherlands.

Overground, this metro station serves as a connection to the tram lines 4, 14 and 24 as well as the night buses N85, N86, N87 & N88.

The station, designed by Benthem Crouwel Architekten, has an island platform 125 meters long and approximately 11.8 meters wide. There are two exits, one on the north side of Rokin, south of Dam Square, and the other one north of Spui. The station is handles approximately 30,000 passengers per day. The station is located at a depth of 21.5 meters below NAP. NOS reported on March 8, 2018, that "Travellers who take the metro at the Rokin first stand on the escalator for two and a half minutes before they reach the platform." Because of the great depth, the height difference to be bridged is so great that the platform can only be accessible by lift and escalators. Fixed stairs are not used here. On top of the station, there is an underground car park for 250 cars and an underground bicycle shed for 300 bicycles.

The station is also used for an exhibition of the archaeological objects found in the soil of Amsterdam during the construction of the metro line. Four artists were selected to create a design for this exhibition, in combination with a work of art on the platform level. In December 2013, a special committee of the municipality selected a work of art by the British-French artist duo Daniel Dewar and Grégory Gicquel for this station. The artwork consists of two long showcases between the escalators in which various archaeological finds are exhibited. Enlarged images of these finds can be found on both walls along the tracks in mosaic form. These mosaics are constructed from: ceramics, coloured glass and stone.

== Tram Services ==
These services are operated by GVB

- 4 Centraal Station - Dam - Rembrandtplein - De Pijp - Rivierenbuurt - Europaplein - Station RAI
- 14 Centraal Station - Dam - Rembrandtplein - Waterlooplein - Artis - Indische Buurt - Flevopark
- 24 Centraal Station - Dam - Weteringcircuit - De Pijp - Oud-Zuid - Olympisch Stadion - VU
