= Vijzelgracht metro station =

Station on the North–South Line of the Amsterdam Metro

Vijzelgracht
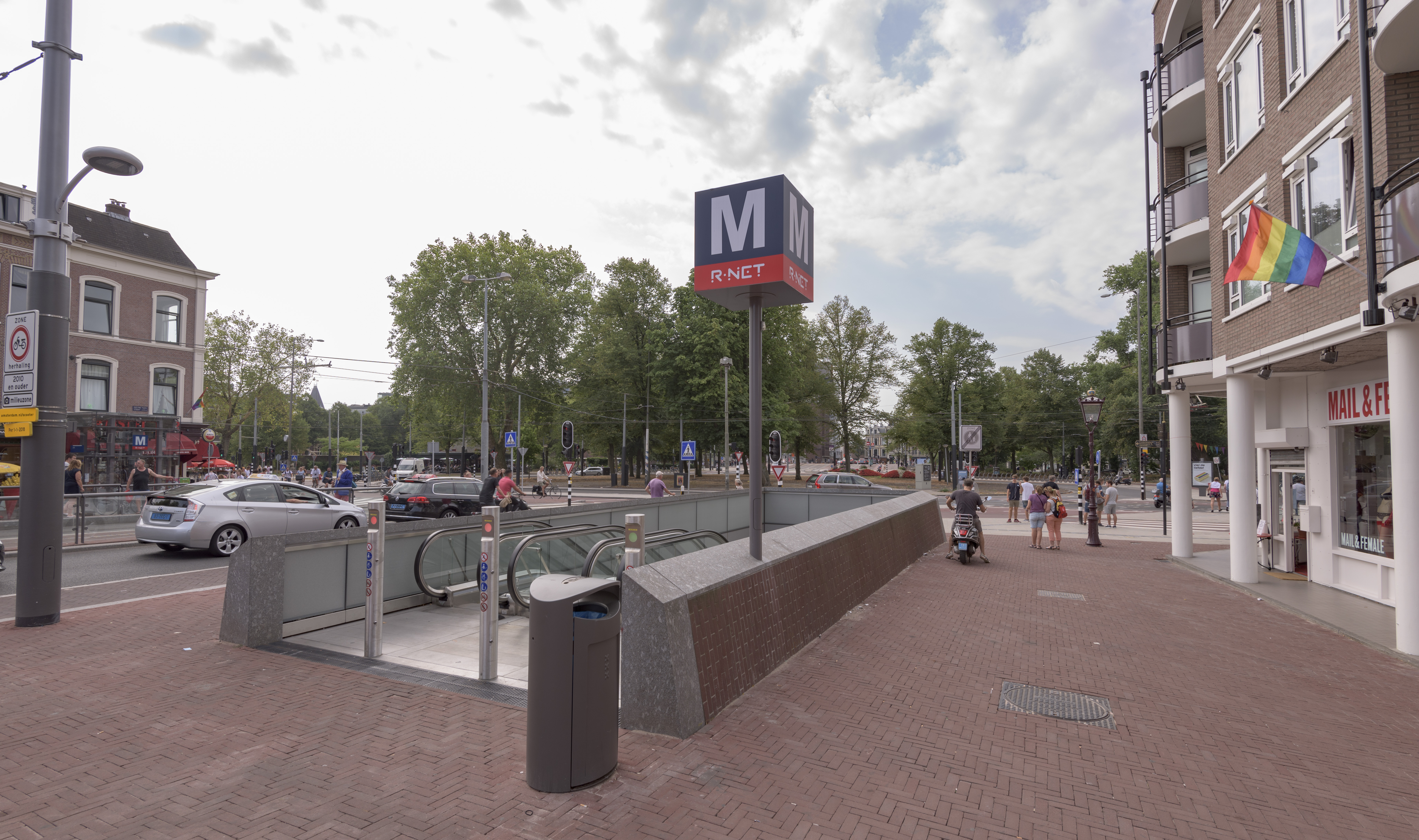
- Vijzelgracht metro station main entrance

General information
- Location: Weteringschans, Amsterdam, Netherlands
- Coordinates: 52°21′39″N 4°53′28″E
- Owner: City of Amsterdam
- Operator: GVB
- Line: 52 (Metro)
- Platforms: 1 island platform
- Tracks: 2

Construction
- Structure type: Underground

Other information
- Station code: VZT
- Fare zone: 5700 (Centrum)

History
- Opened: 22 July 2018

Services
Preceding station	Amsterdam Metro	Following station
Rokin towards Noord	Line 52	De Pijp towards Station Zuid
Preceding station	Amsterdam Tram	Following station
Muntplein towards Centraal Station	Line 14	Weteringcircuit towards Flevopark
Rijksmuseum towards Muiderpoortstation	Line 1	Frederiksplein towards Osdorp de Aker
Rijksmuseum towards Azartplein	Line 7	Frederiksplein towards Slotermeer
Rijksmuseum towards Diemen Sniep	Line 19	Frederiksplein towards Station Sloterdijk
Rijksmuseum towards Frederiksplein	Line 24	Frederiksplein towards De Boelelaan/VU
Location
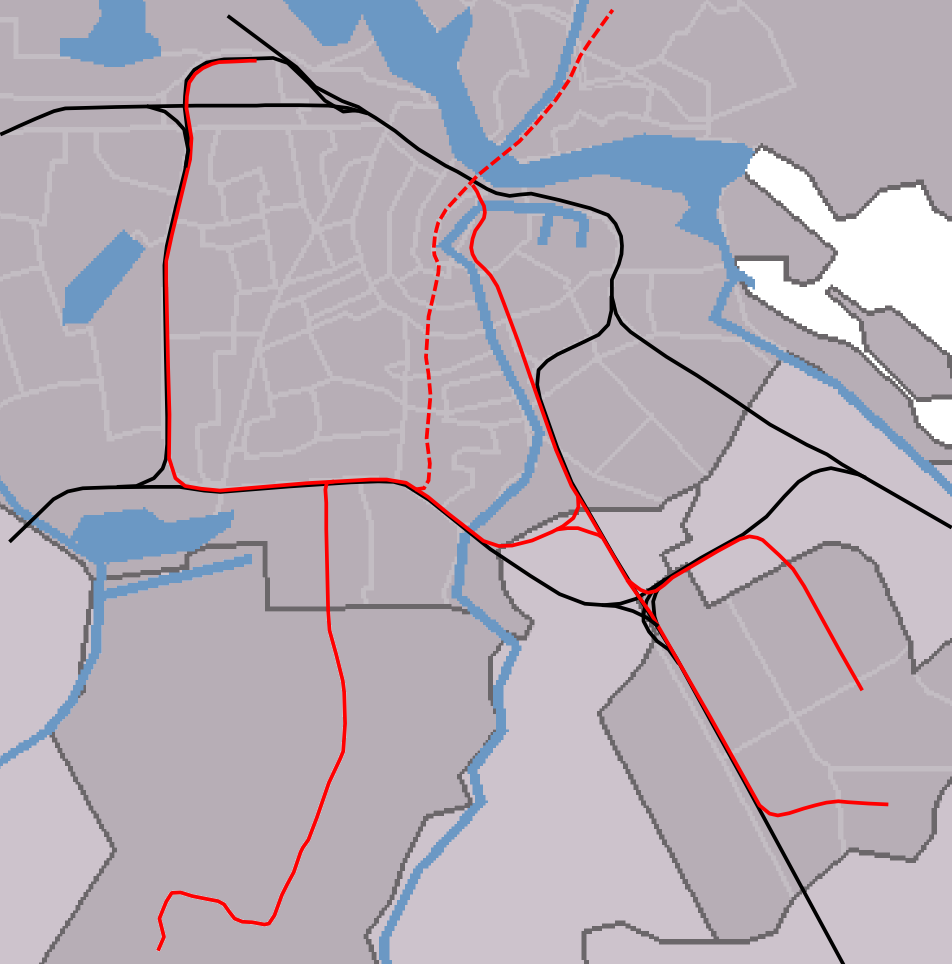
- Location within metro van Amsterdam

Vijzelgracht metro station (Dutch: Station Vijzelgracht) is a station on the Route 52 (North–South Line) of the Amsterdam Metro in Amsterdam, Netherlands. It was opened on 22 July 2018.

Vijzelgracht is an underground station situated in the Weteringschans neighbourhood of the Amsterdam-Centrum borough. The station, designed by Benthem Crouwel Architects, is situated beneath the Vijzelstraat between Prinsengracht and Weteringschans in the former Vijzelgracht canal that was dammed in 1933. The station has a 125-metre-long island platform, approximately 9 metres wide. There are two entrances, the north entrance near the Maison Descartes and the south entrance near Weteringplantsoen. The south entrance also serves the tram lines 1, 7, 19 (east–west) and 24 (north–south). The station lies 26 metres below street level and is expected to handle a number of 22,000 passengers and passengers per day.

The platform is accessible by both lift and escalator. The station is future-proofed for a possible parking structure which would be located at the south entrance. It is also future-proofed for a long-proposed East–West metro line that would be built 11 metres below street level under either the Singelgracht or Weteringschans, with the line running over the North–South tunnel and under the south ticket hall.

== History ==
=== Construction problems ===
Vijzelgracht station was beset with construction issues affecting nearby structures. On 19 June 2008, four historic buildings on the Vijzelstraat subsided 15 cm and its residents evacuated due to a breach in a tunnel wall, causing water to enter the tunnel, eroding the pilings that supported the buildings, with work stopped on 23 June. Work resumed on 9 September 2008, with the municipal government and the project bureau doing testing and assuring local residents that issues had been mitigated. However, on 10 September, additional buildings began subsiding again, this time 23 centimetres, again caused by water leaks in the tunnel.

In January 2009 a whistleblower, a concrete delivery driver, spoke to the press about the use of old concrete that resulted in cast walls that were brittle and of poor quality. Testing was ordered by the municipal government and conducted by the research firm Deltares, which found 114 weak points and a hole in the concrete sheet pilings used in the Vijzelgracht project. According to the firm, these weak spots were mostly caused by the "use of bad and contaminated concrete and poor reinforcement".

=== Ramses Shaffy naming proposal ===
In 2011, a proposal was made to name the station after Dutch actor and singer Ramses Shaffy, a longtime resident of the Vijzelgracht neighbourhood. The municipal government decided to retain the Vijzelgracht name under the policy of naming stations after their locations. However, the city invited artists to create a work of art dedicated to Shaffy in the metro station. On 23 February 2013, Liesbeth List announced on the Dutch television programme "Opium" that a portrait of Ramses Shaffy, interwoven with map lines of the Metro, was designed at the metro station, designed by Dutch artist Marjan Laaper.

== Gallery ==
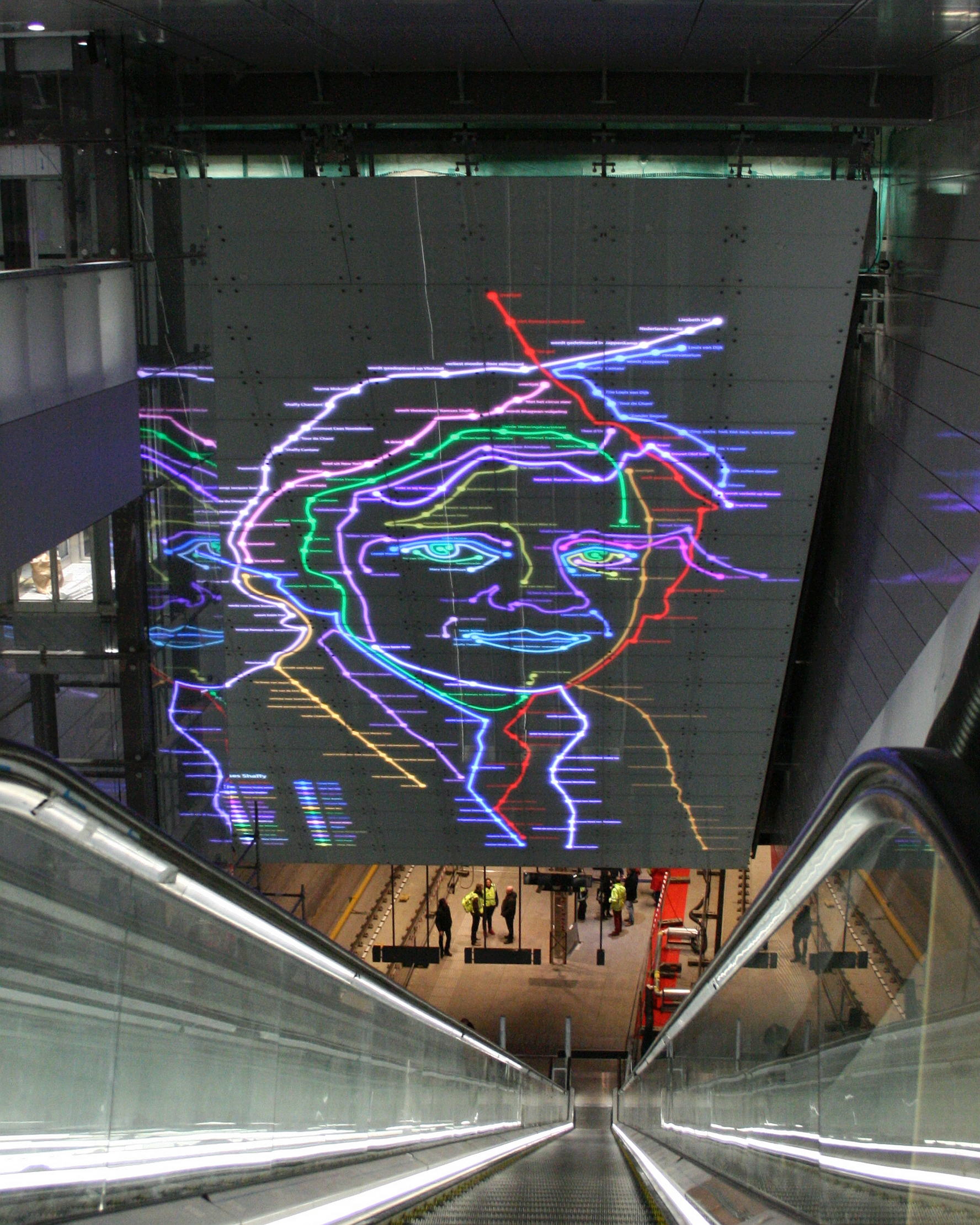
Artwork depicting Ramses Shaffy over the southern escalators

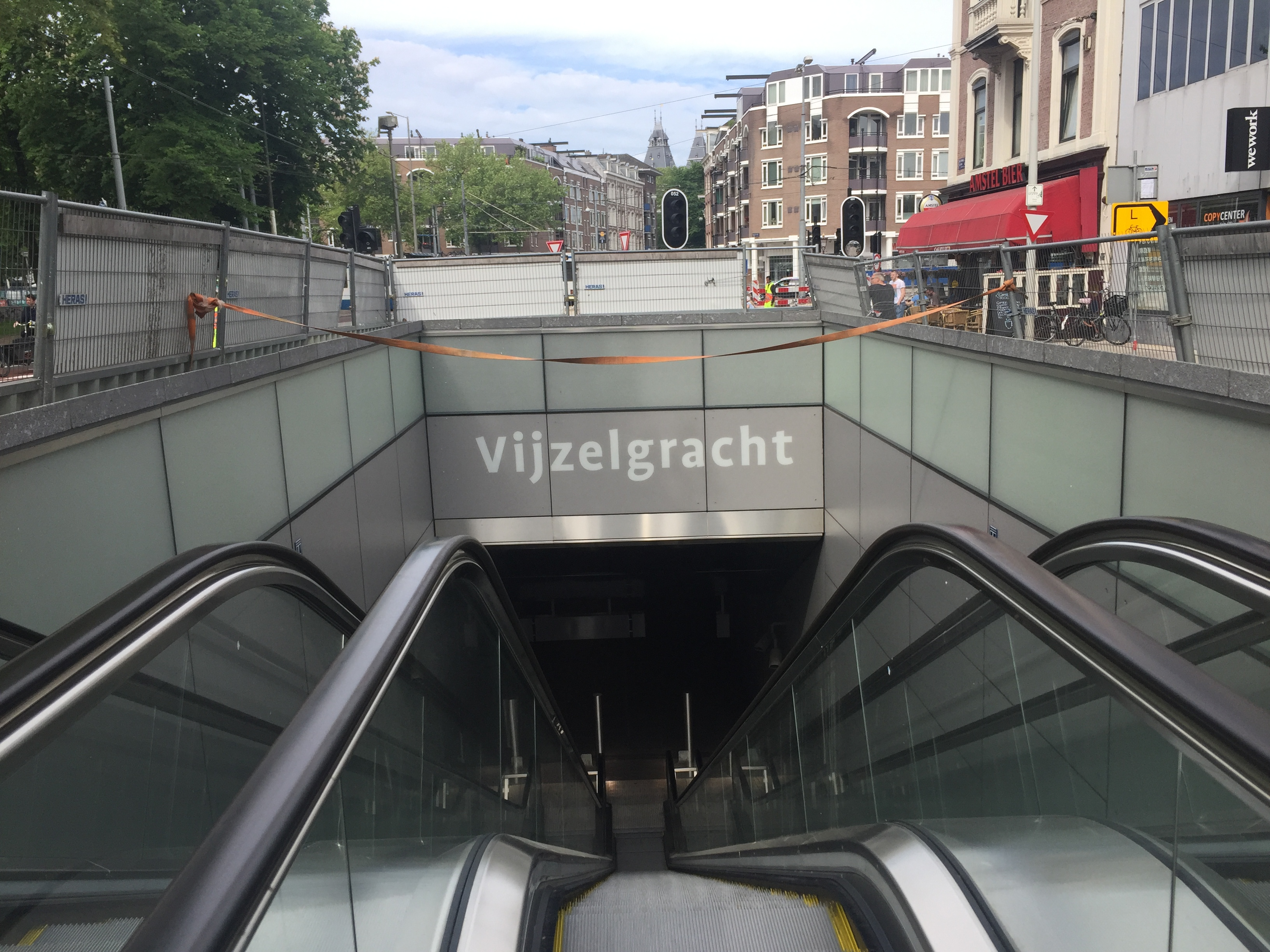
Vijzelgracht entrance, May 2018

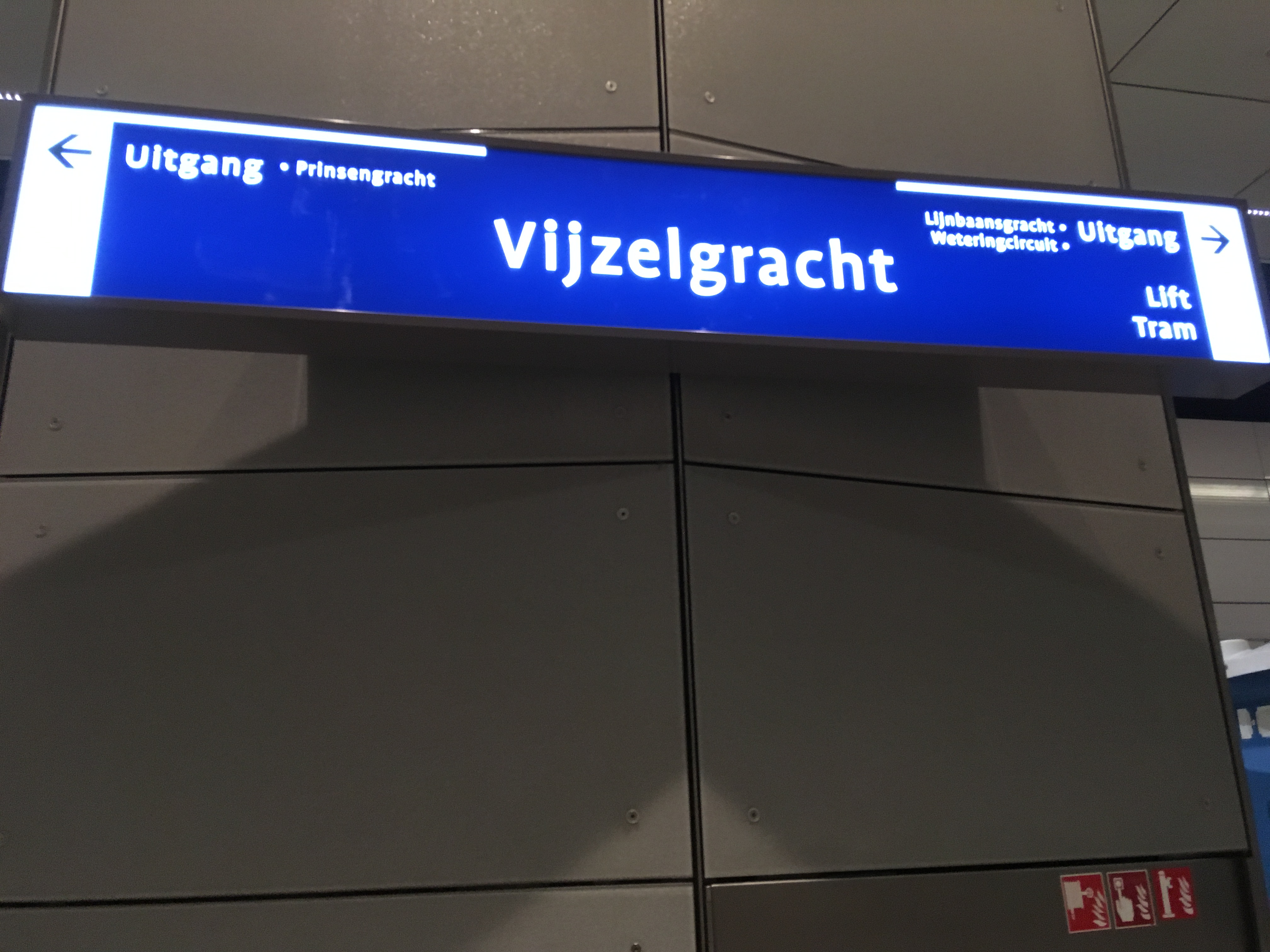
Vijzelgracht station signage

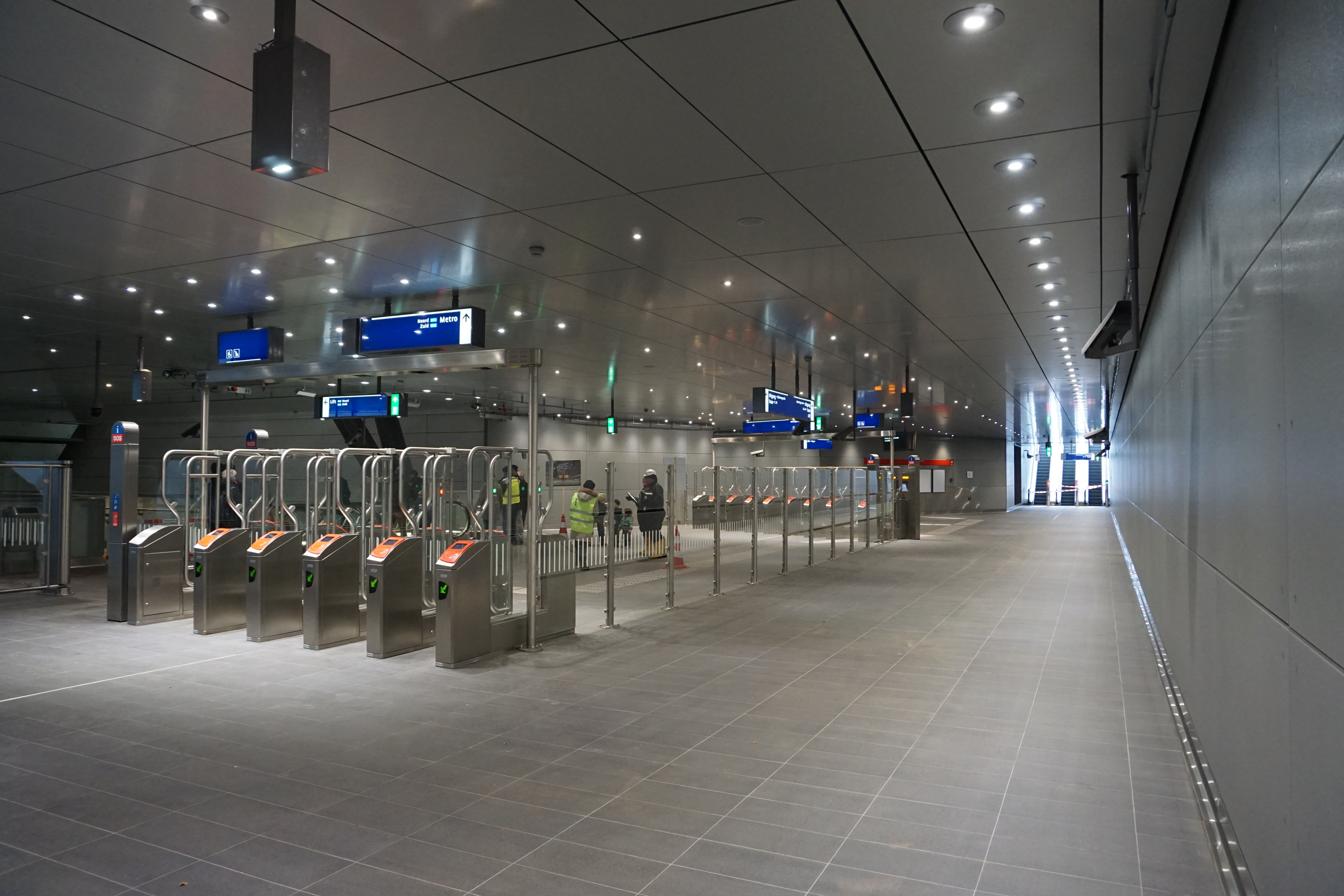
Vijzelgracht station, south ticket hall, January 2018

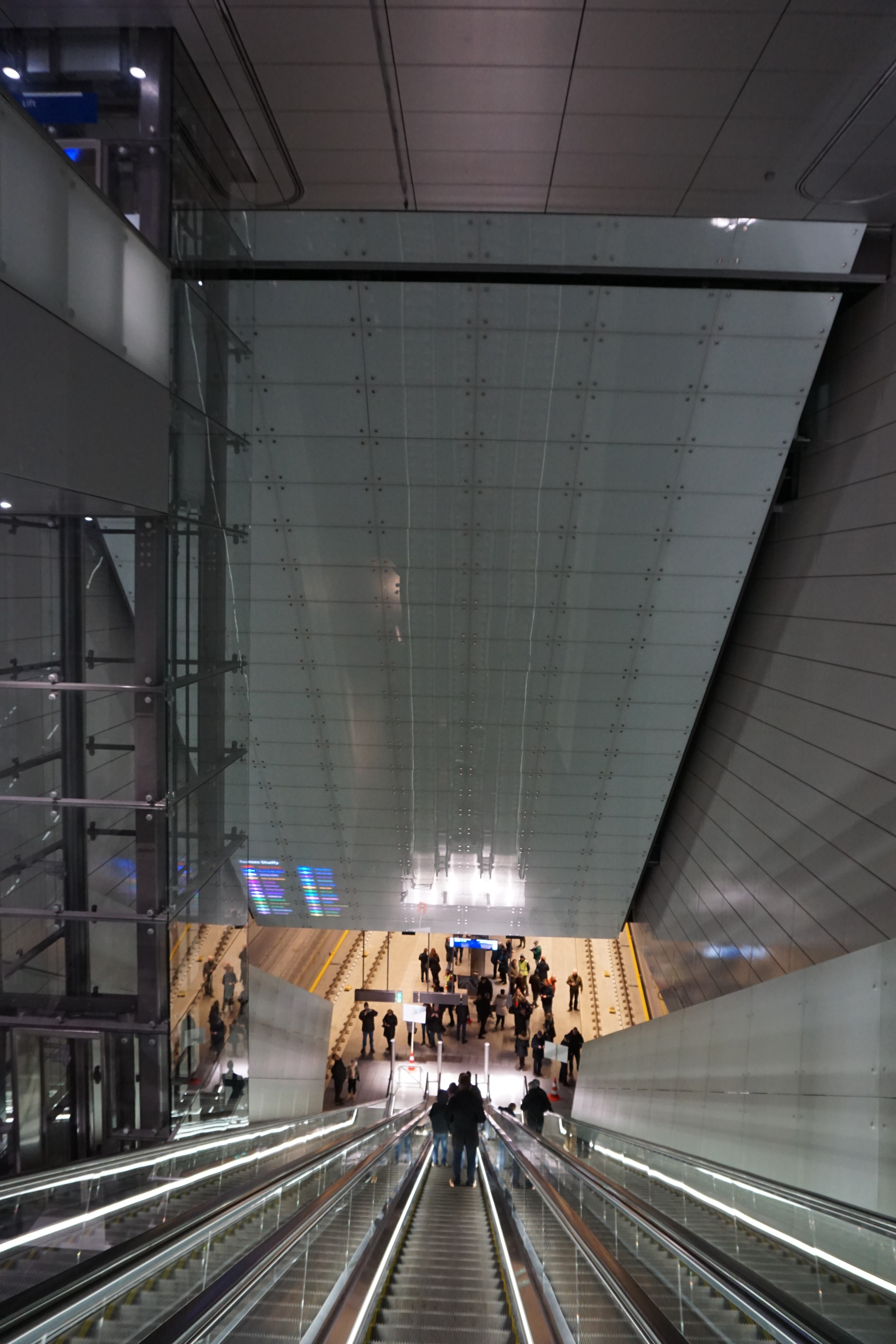
Vijzelgracht station, south-end escalators, January 2018

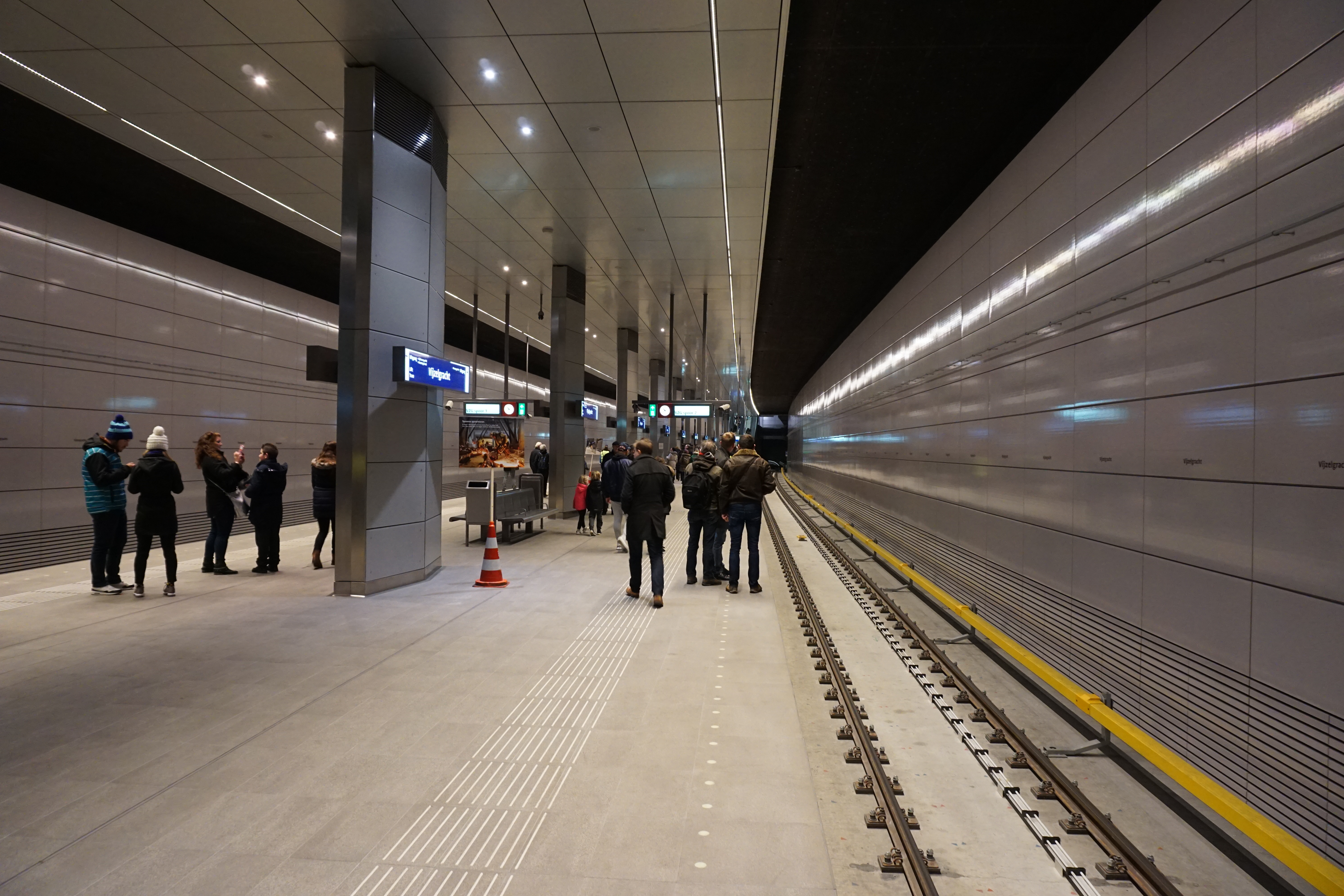
Vijzelgracht station, platform, January 2018

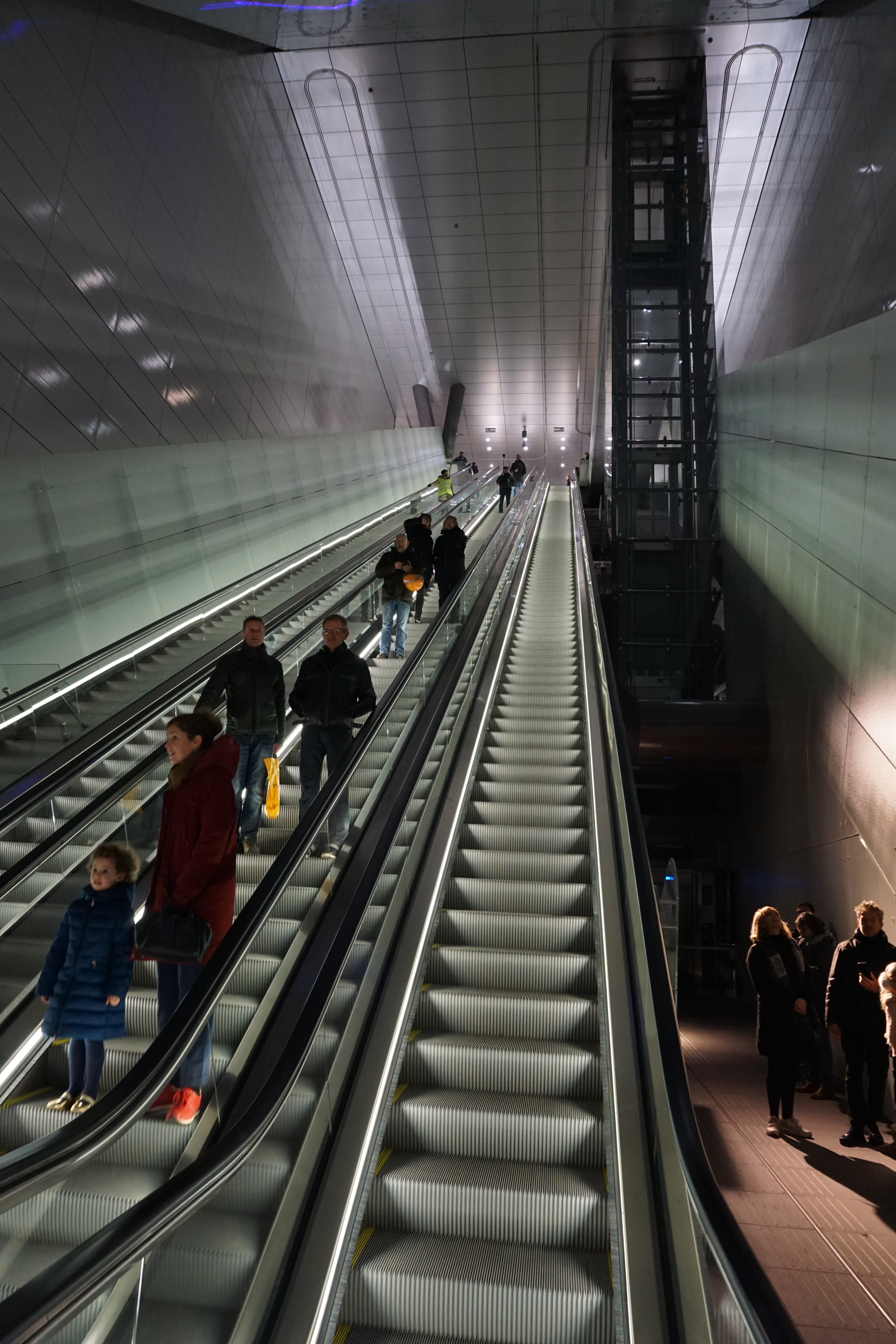
Vijzelgracht station, south-end mezzanine escalators; at 47 metres, it is longest in the Benelux nations, January 2018

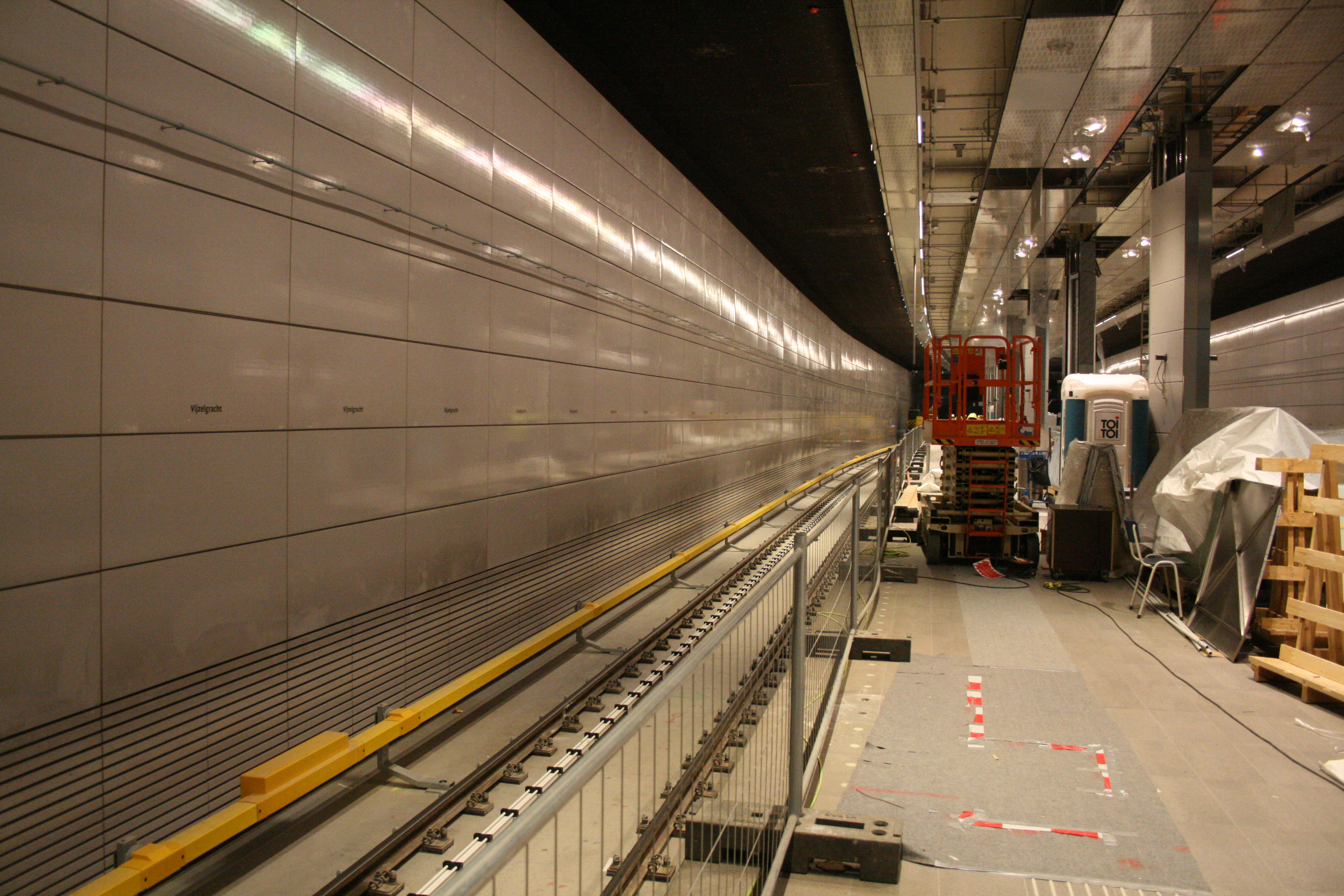
Vijzelgracht station, platform, December 2016

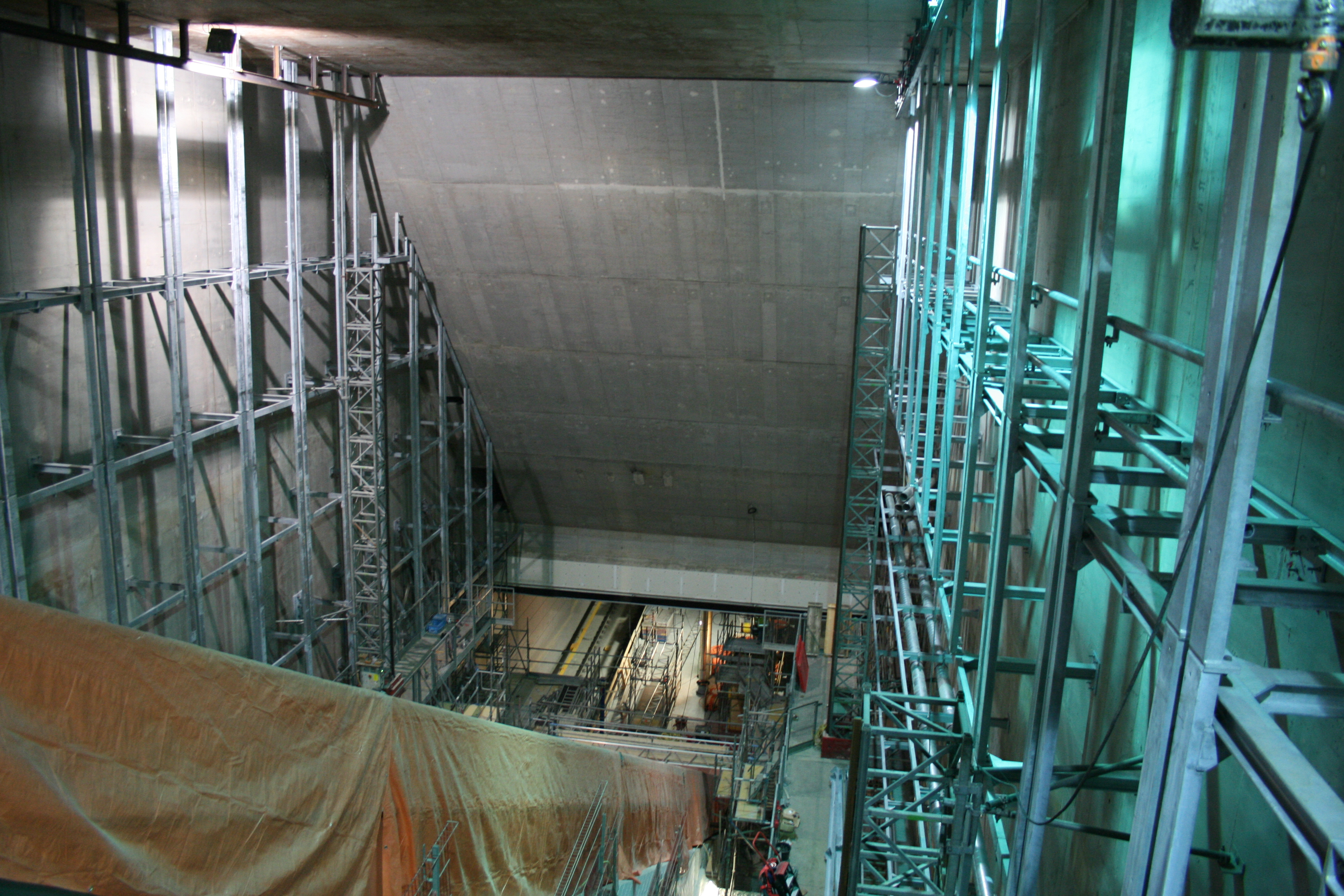
Vijzelgracht station, view of the platform from the northern entrance, December 2015

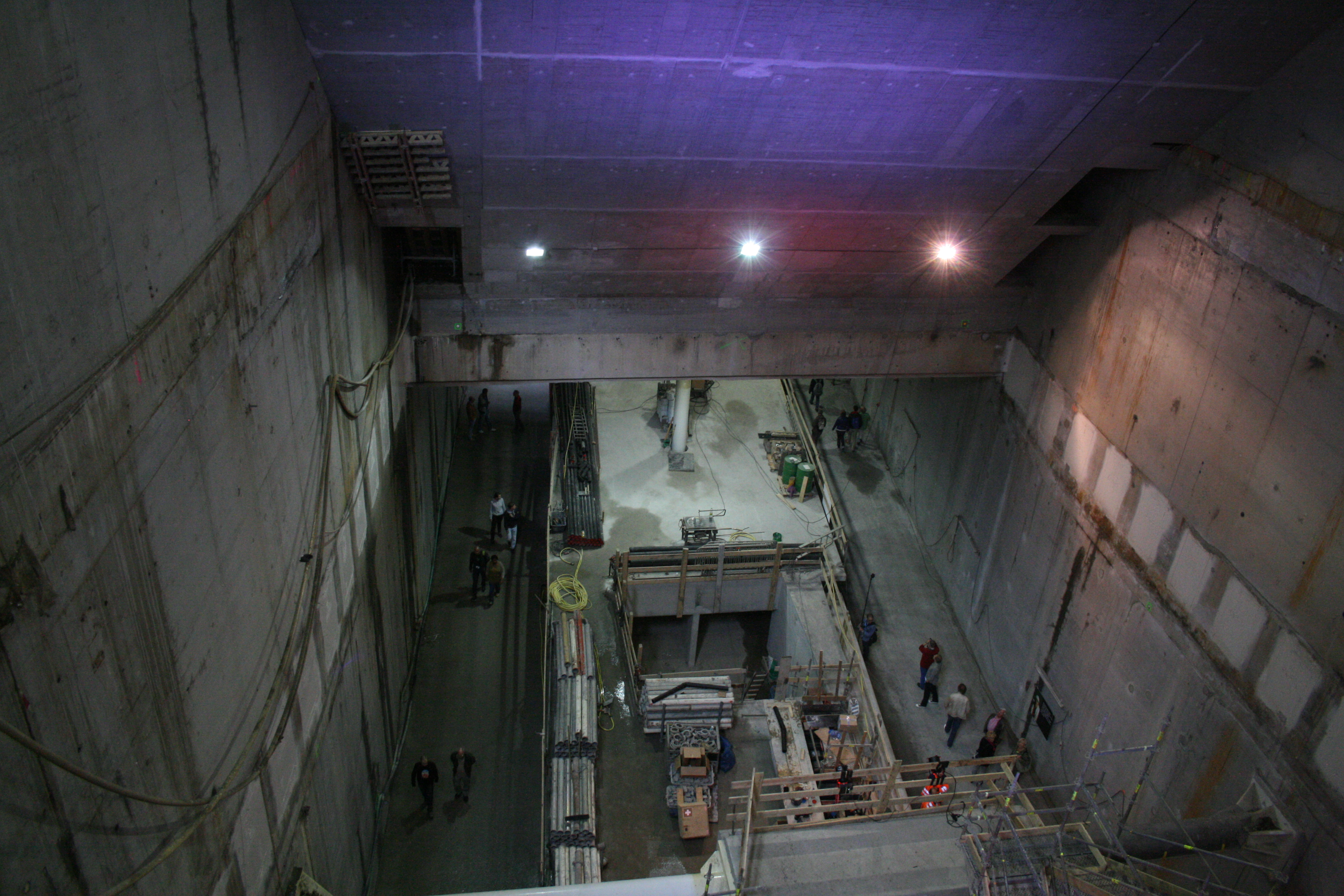
Vijzelgracht station, view of the platform from the southern entrance, May 2014

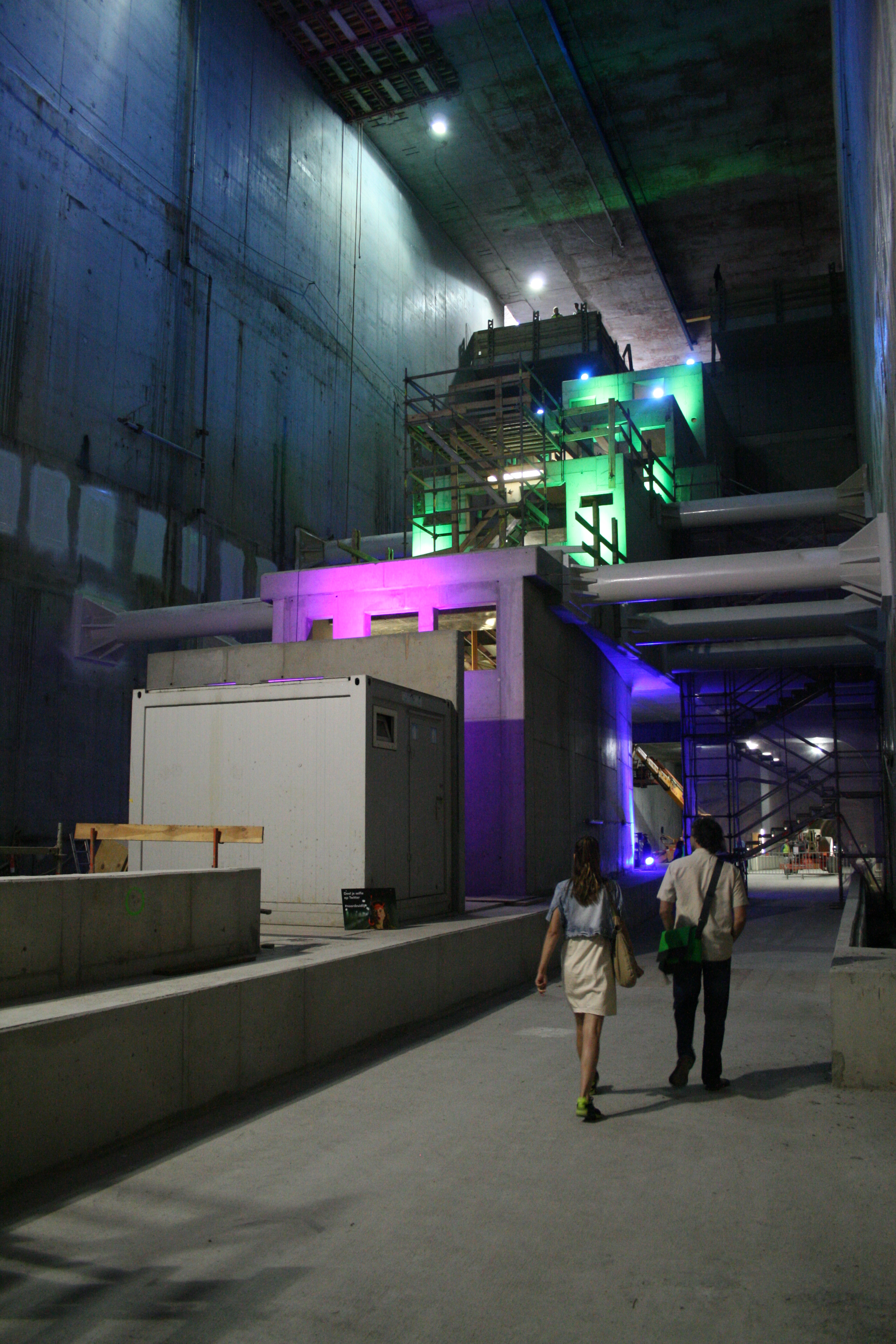
Northern station entrance, as seen from the trackbed, May 2014

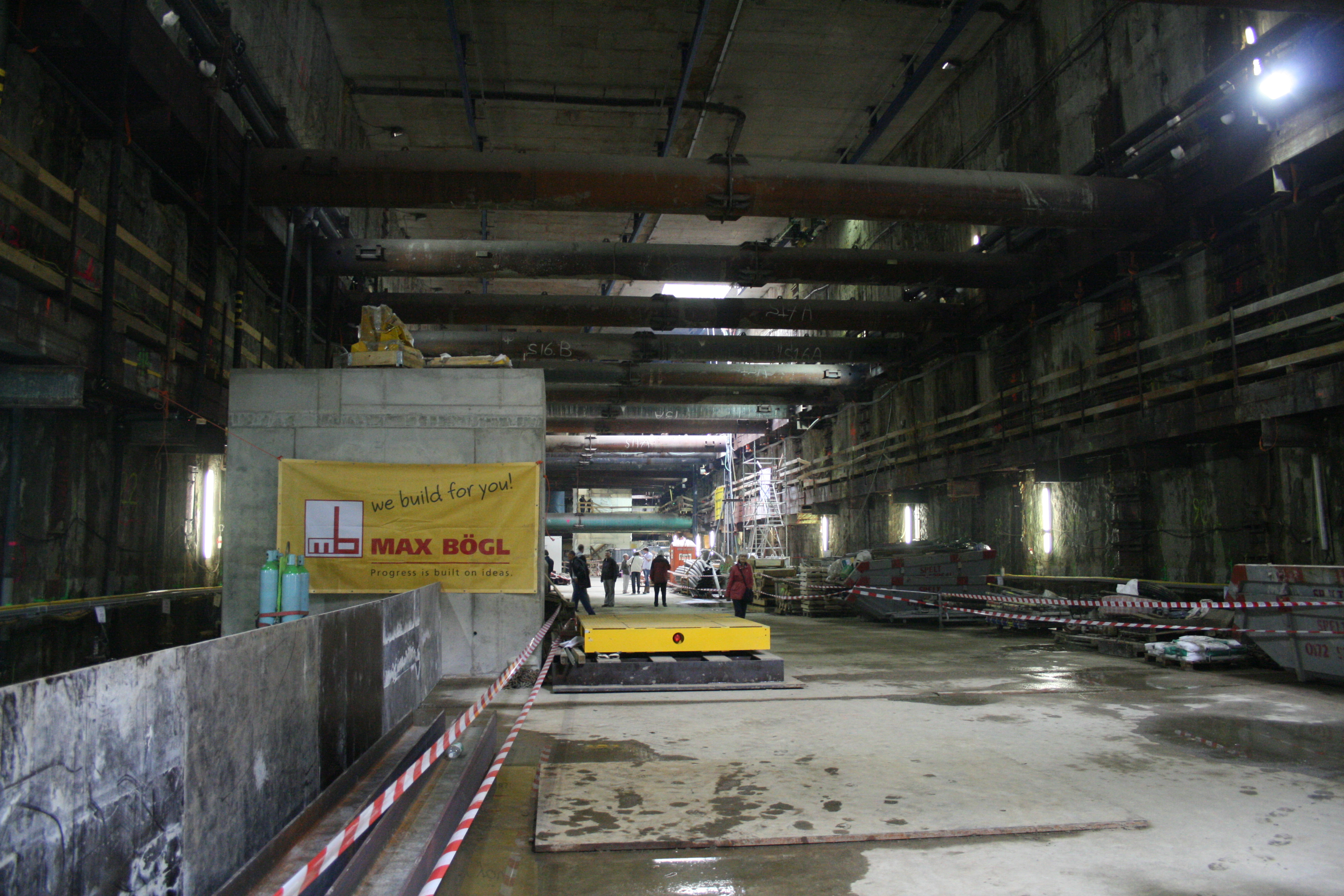
Platform-level station box, May 2011

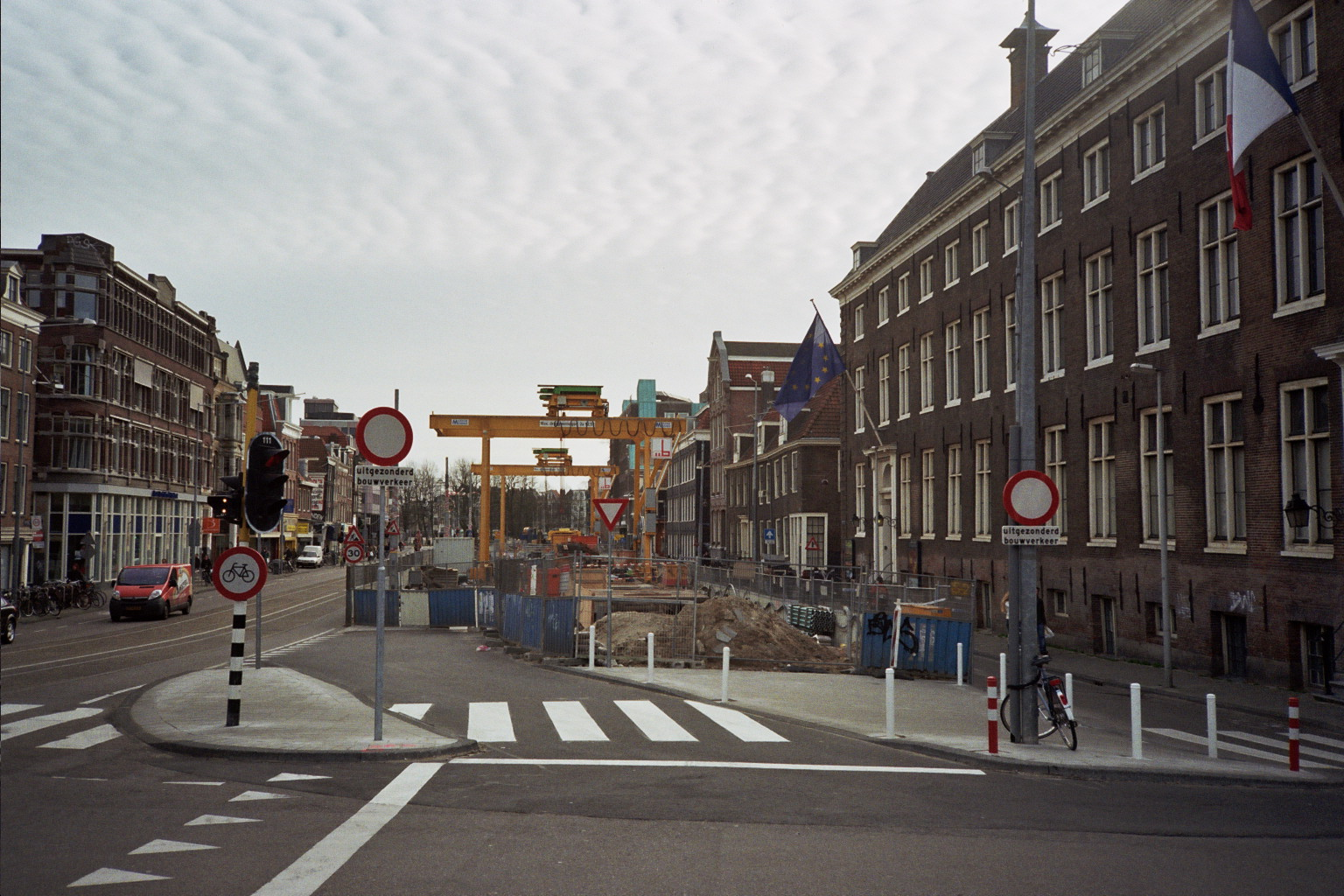
Station entrance under construction; at right is the Walloon Orphanage/Maison Descartes

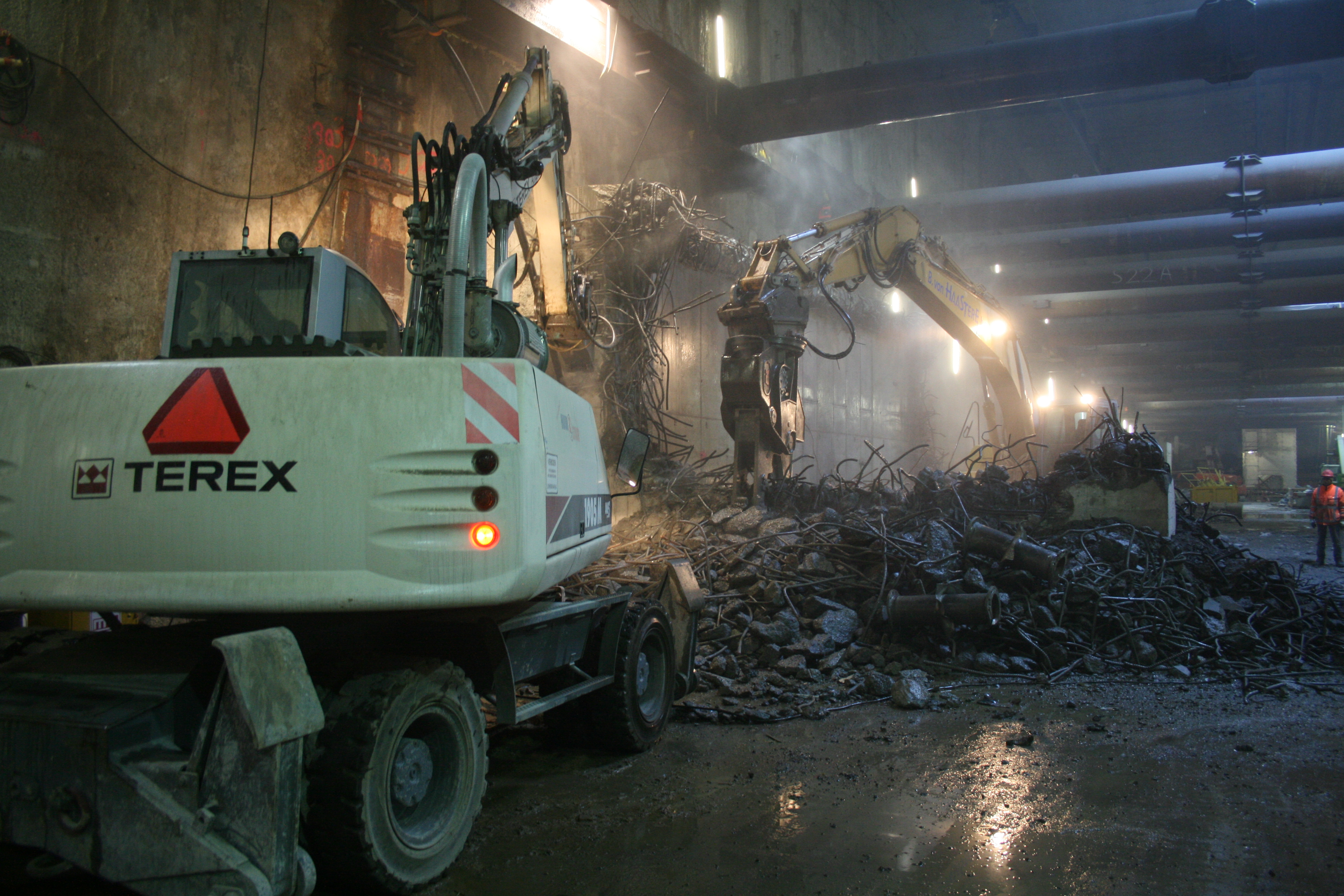
Excavation and demolition, February 2012

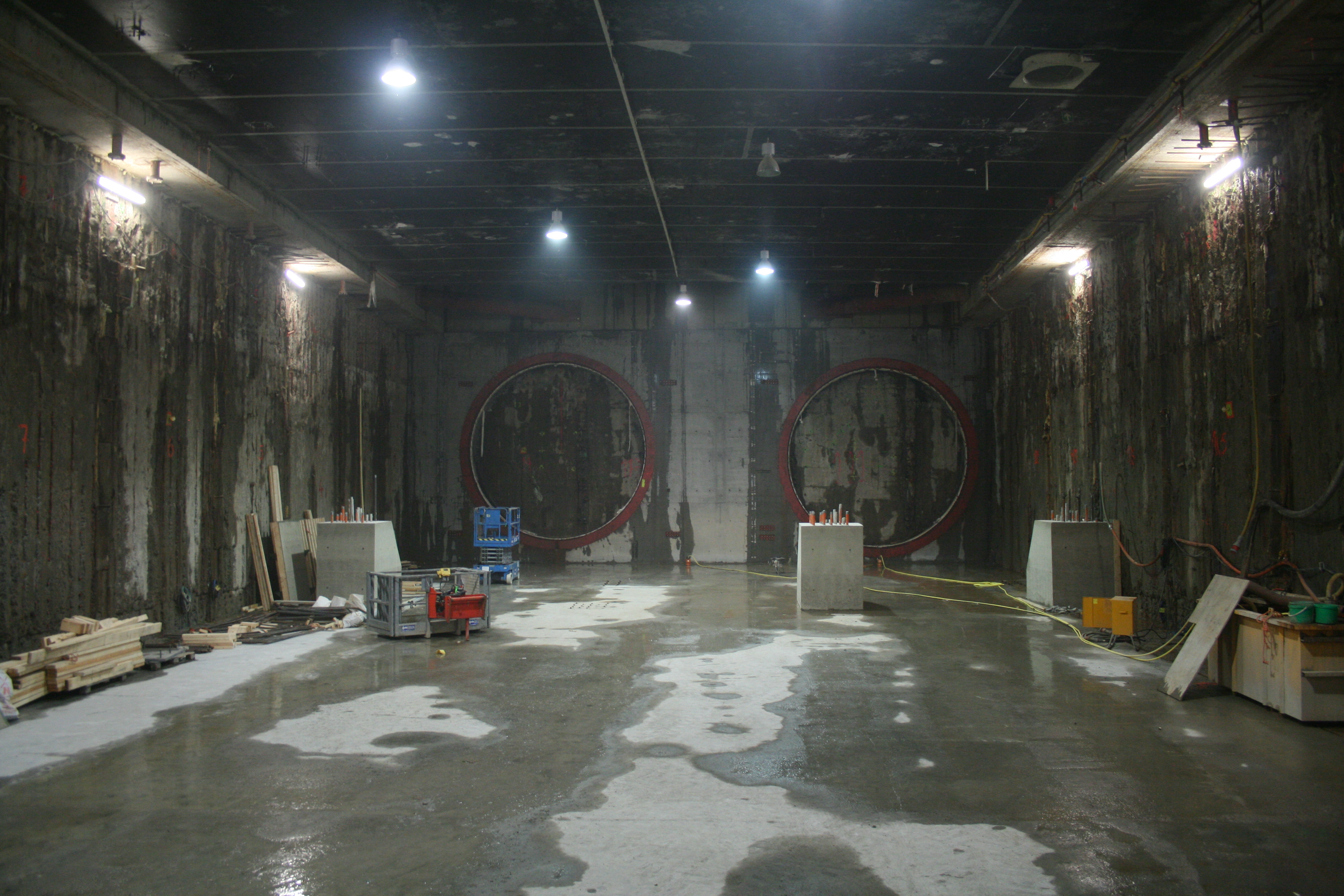
Southern end of the station box, before the TBM breakthrough, February 2012
