= Rokin =

Canal in Amsterdam

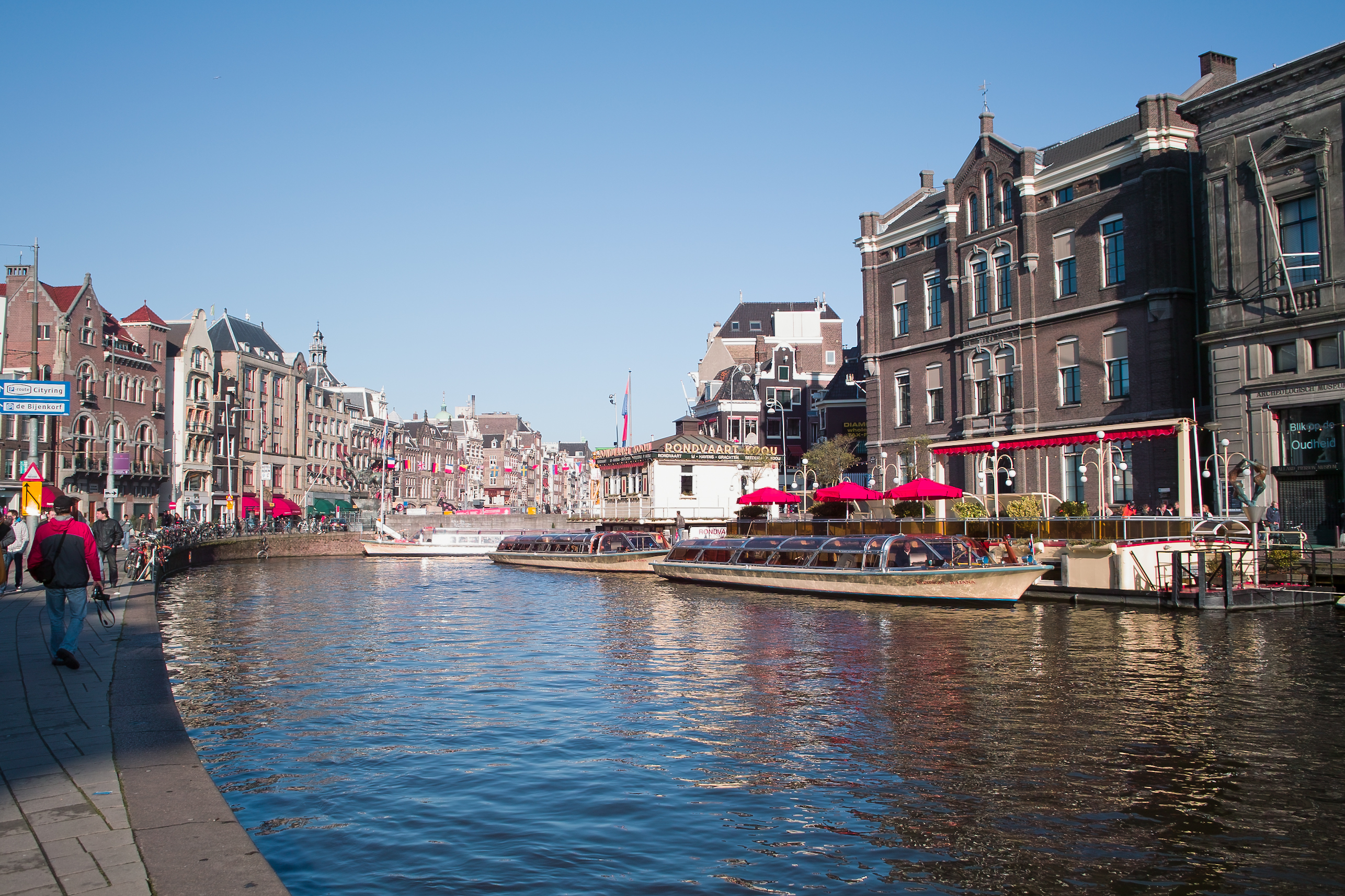
- Rokin in 2009
- Interactive map of Rokin
- Location: Amsterdam
- Postal code: 1012
- Coordinates: 52.368282°N 4.892788°E
- South end: Muntplein square
- To: Dam Square

The Rokin is a canal and major street in the centre of Amsterdam. The street runs from Muntplein square to Dam square. The Rokin canal used to run from Muntplein square to Dam Square, but in 1936, the part between Spui square and Dam Square was filled in. Canal boats are now moored on the remaining part of the water, from the Amstel to Grimburgwal.

== History ==
Originally the Rokin was a section of the river Amstel, and was known then as Ruck-in (from 'inrukken', which means 'to withdraw', as some of the houses on the Amstel had to be shortened to construct the quays there in the 16th century).

Amsterdam's first commodities exchange was built in 1608-1609 at the corner of the Rokin and Dam Square. The commodities exchange, designed by Hendrick de Keyser, played a key part in the economic success of the city during the Dutch Golden Age. The building was demolished in 1835.

During the construction of the metro North-South line, Line 52, archeologists dug down to a depth of approximately 20 metres on the Rokin. The archeological finds in what used to be the Amstel river are expected to shed new light on the history of Amsterdam and on the landscape and environment of the area in the millennia that preceded the founding of the city.

The Mirakelkolom, which normally stands on the Rokin, was temporarily removed during the construction of the metro line. The Mirakelkolom is a stone column made up of remnants of the Heilige Stede (Nieuwezijds Kapel), a chapel built to commemorate the 1345 Mirakel van Amsterdam (Miracle of the Host). The chapel was demolished in 1908.

A fire in the Rokin on May 9, 1977, claimed 33 deaths.

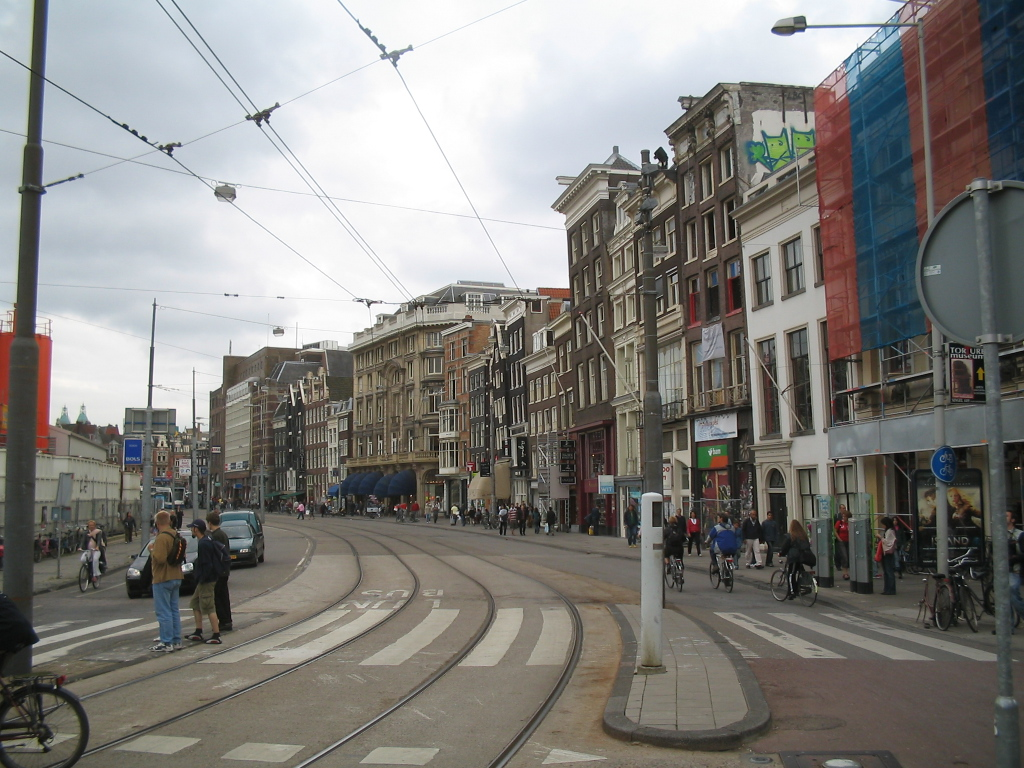
The Rokin in 2005, with construction on the North-South line underway.

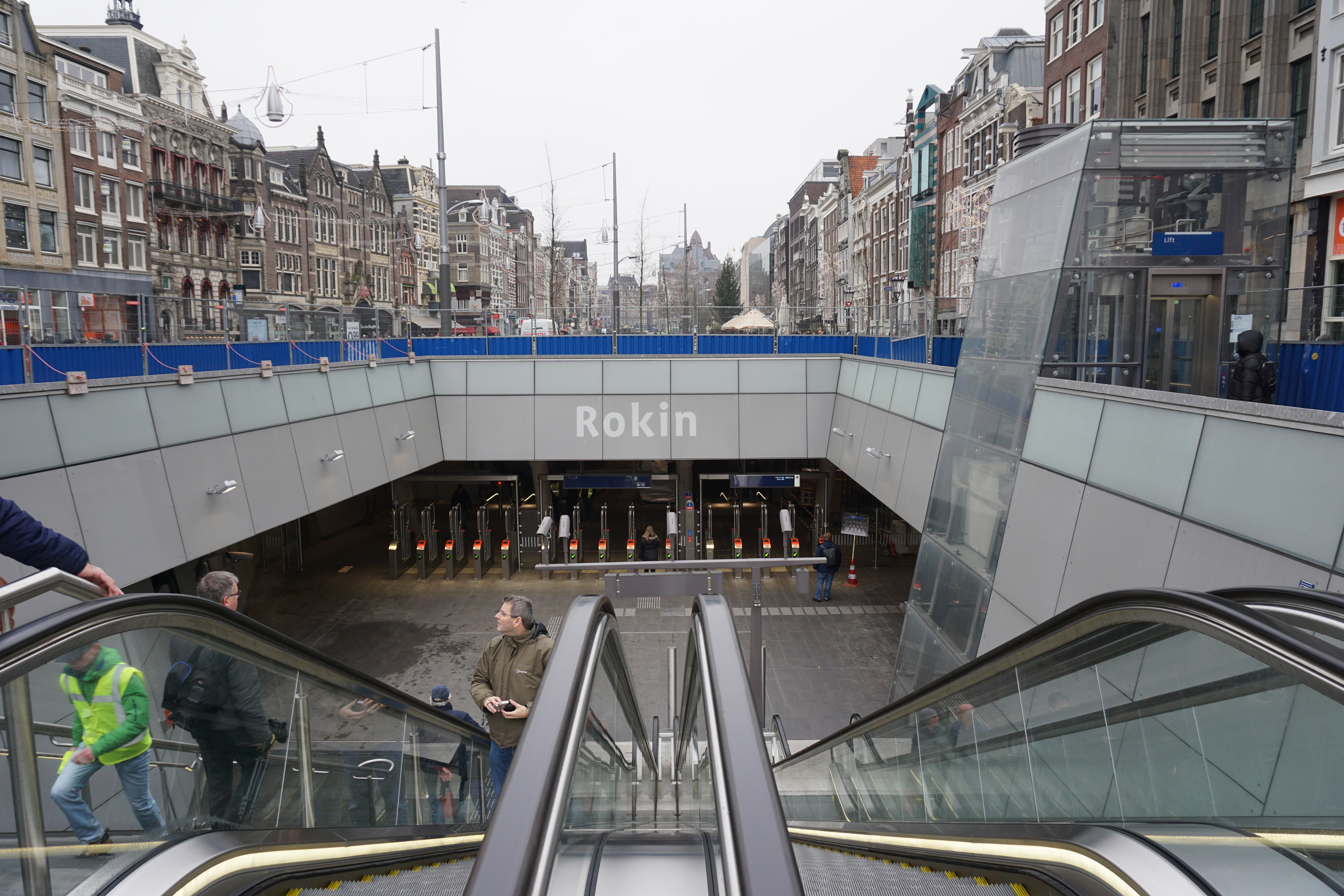
Entrance to Rokin metro station.

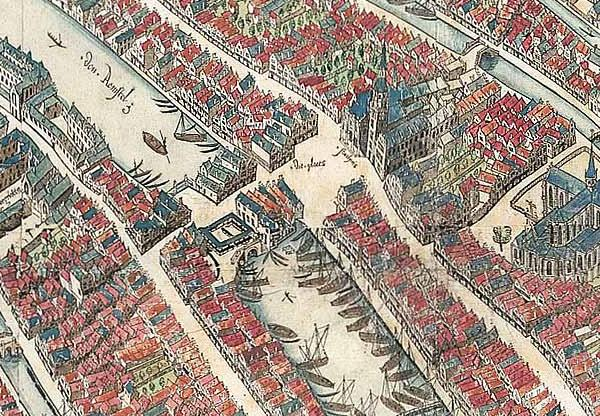
Amsterdam in 1544, with Dam square in the centre and the Rokin in the top left. In 1936, the Rokin was filled in from Dam square to Spui square.

== Notable buildings ==
- Arti et Amicitiae, an artists' society and art gallery at the corner of Rokin and Spui, constructed in 1841 and designed in part by Berlage.
- The former offices of The Marine Insurance Company Limited at Rokin 69, a Jugendstil building from 1901 designed by Gerrit van Arkel.
- Tobacco shop Hajenius at Rokin 92-96, royal purveyor of cigars and other tobacco goods since 1826. Both the building from 1914 and the richly decorated interior were designed by the brothers van Gendt, sons of the prominent 19th century architect Adolf Leonard van Gendt.
- The Allard Pierson Museum for antiquities, on the Oude Turfmarkt, in the former headquarters of the Nederlandsche Bank, the Dutch central bank.
- Magazijn De Gouden Bril, the oldest remaining optician in the Netherlands, at Rokin 72. There is a statue of a monkey with binoculars on the rooftop.
- The house of Pieter Janszoon Sweelinck, son of composer and organ player Jan Pieterszoon Sweelinck, at Rokin 145, built in 1642/1643 under the direction of Philips Vingboons, with a splendid example of a raised neck-gable at the top of the building.
- Hotel de l'Europe, at the corner of the Nieuwe Doelenstraat and the Rokin, an imposing building from 1895/96.

== Transport ==
Rokin metro station on Route 52 of the Amsterdam Metro opened in July 2018. The Rokin is also served by tramway lines 4, 14 and 24.

== See also ==
- List of streets in Amsterdam
