= Spui (Amsterdam) =

Square in Amsterdam, Netherlands

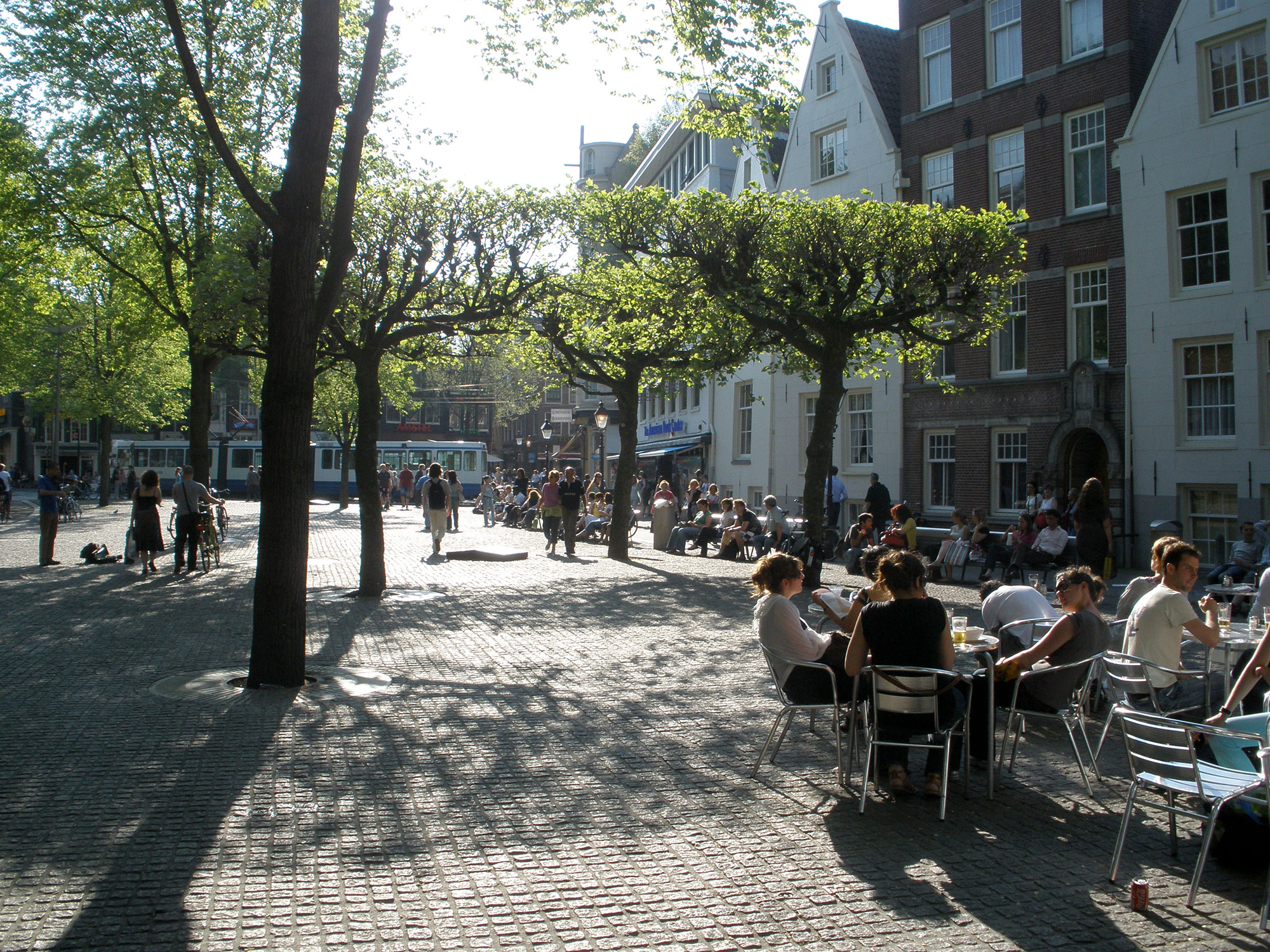
- Spui in 2008

- Location within Amsterdam
- Location: Amsterdam, Netherlands
- Nearest metro station: Rokin
- Coordinates: 52°22′07″N 4°53′22″E

The Spui (Dutch pronunciation: [spœy]. In Old Dutch written as Spuy) is a square in the centre of Amsterdam, the capital of the Netherlands.

The Spui was originally a body of water that formed the southern limit of the city until the 1420s, when the Singel canal was dug as an outer moat around the city. A spui is a lockable water discharge. The word is related to the Dutch verbs spuiten and spuwen, cognates of the English word spewing. Spui could therefore be translated as Spew. In 1882 the Spui was filled in and became the square that we know today. In 1996 the square was renovated and is now largely car-free.

The Spui is hosts a weekly book market on Fridays and a variety of bookstores on or near the square, including two shops dedicated to English-language literature (the American Book Center relocated to the Spui in October 2006). There is also a weekly Sunday art market.

The Spui provides entry to the Begijnhof, a medieval courtyard.

Tram lines 1 and 2 stop at Spui on Nieuwezijds Voorburgwal and tram lines 4, 14 and 24 and stop at the southern entrance of the Rokin metro station located just across Spui.

== Works of art ==
A small statue, Het Lieverdje ("The Little Darling"), stands on the square. The statue represents the youth of Amsterdam, always playing pranks yet with a heart of gold. He was a gift to the city from a cigarette company in 1960. In the 1960s, the Provo counterculture movement held weekly gatherings around the statue.

Also located at the Spui is the work of Lawrence Weiner, Een vertaling van de ene taal in de andere (A Translation from one language to another), three pairs of two stones placed against each other, located at different places of the square. Each pair presents the sentence in Dutch on one side, and on the other side in English, Arabic and Surinaams respectively.

== Notable buildings ==
- The Maagdenhuis (1780), the headquarters of the University of Amsterdam.
- Arti et Amicitiae (1841), an artists' society and art gallery at the corner of Rokin and Spui, designed in part by Berlage.
- Gebouw Helios (1895–96) at Spui 15-19, in Art Nouveau style. The design by Gerrit van Arkel won third prize in the architects' competition at the 1900 World's Fair in Paris.
- The Oude Lutherse Kerk (1632–1633), the Old Lutheran Church, across the Singel canal.
- Spui 10 (1891-1892), a former department store building built in eclectic style designed by Eduard Cuypers
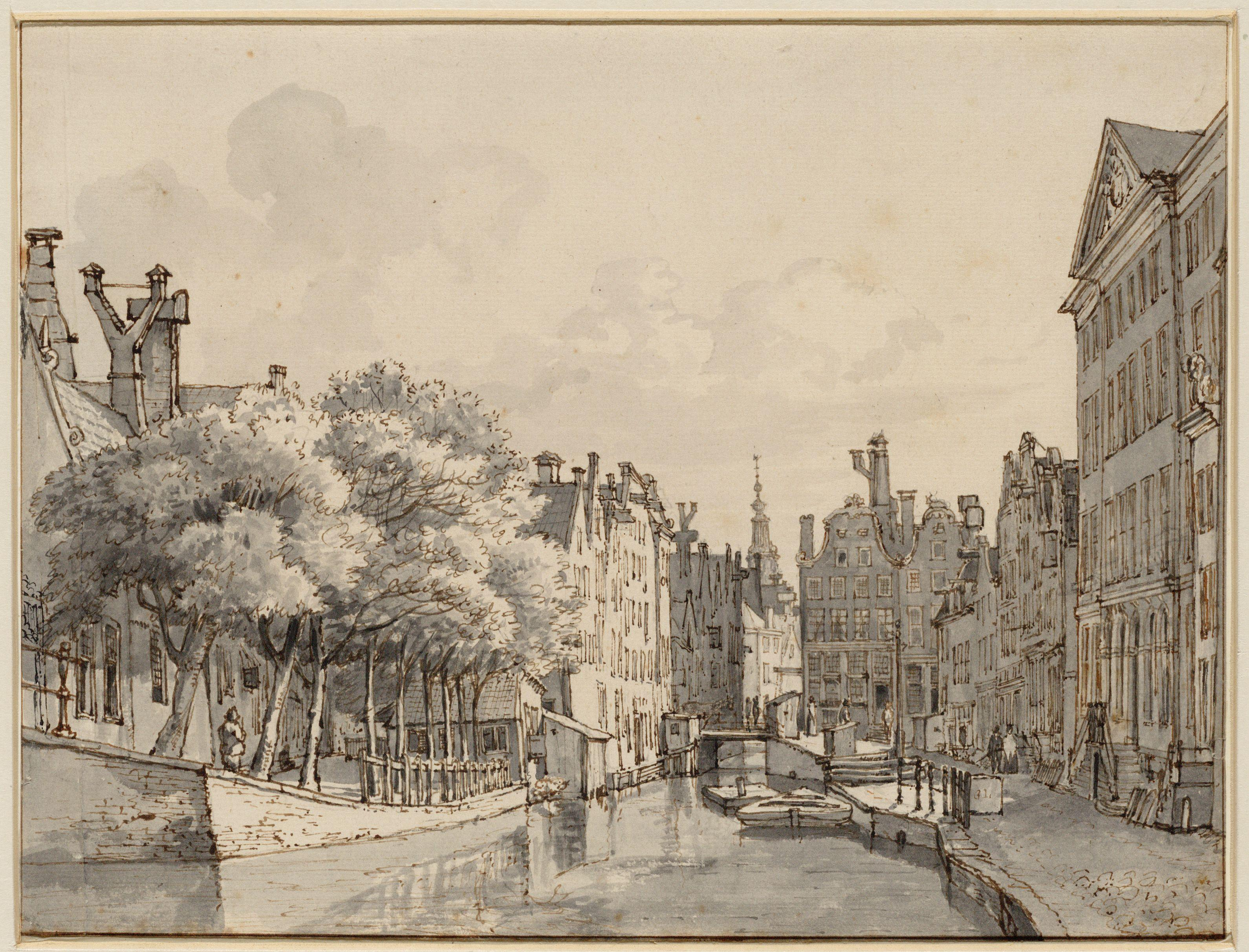
Spui in 1817 by Gerrit Lamberts (1776-1850)

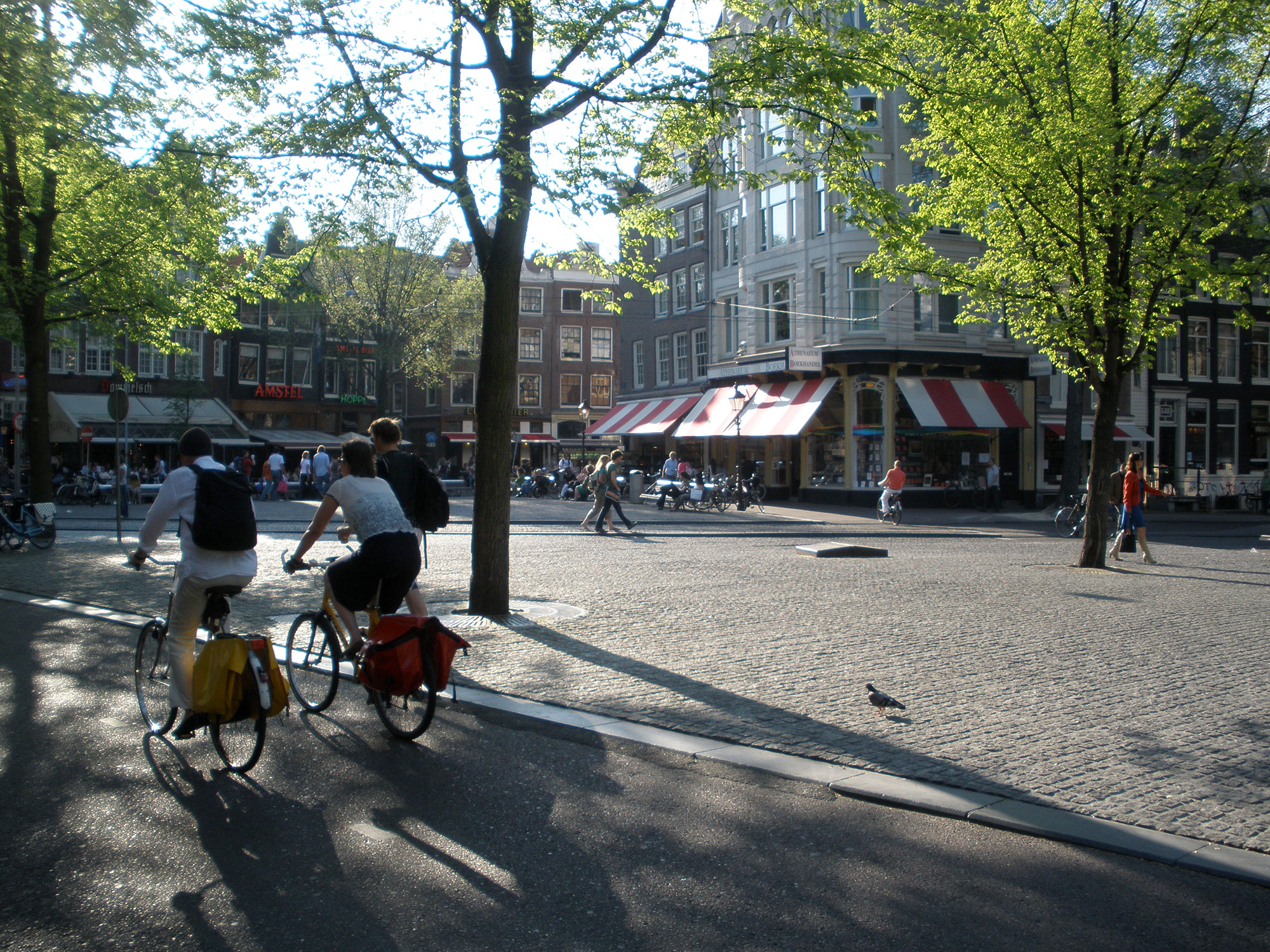

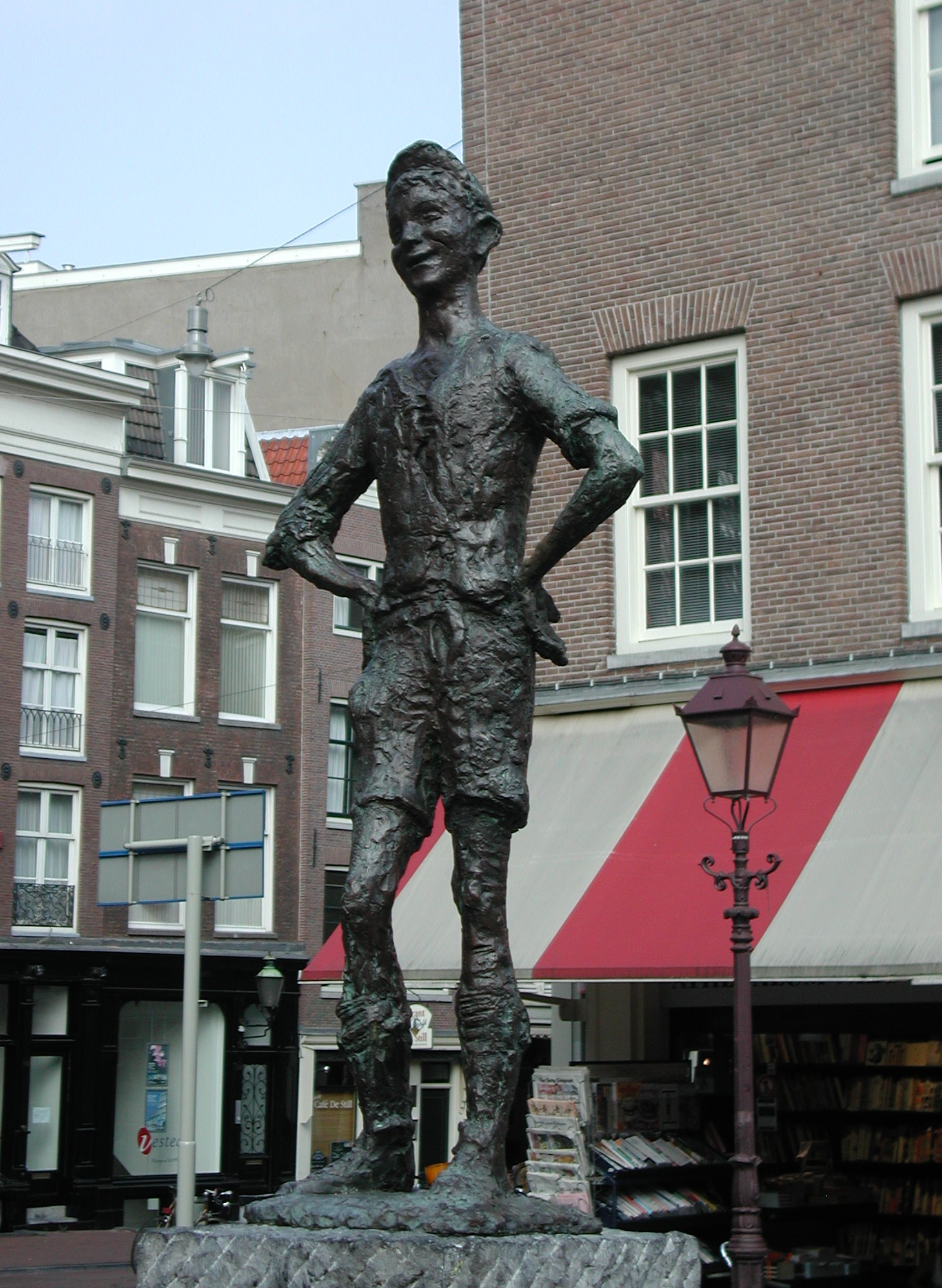
The statue Het Lieverdje

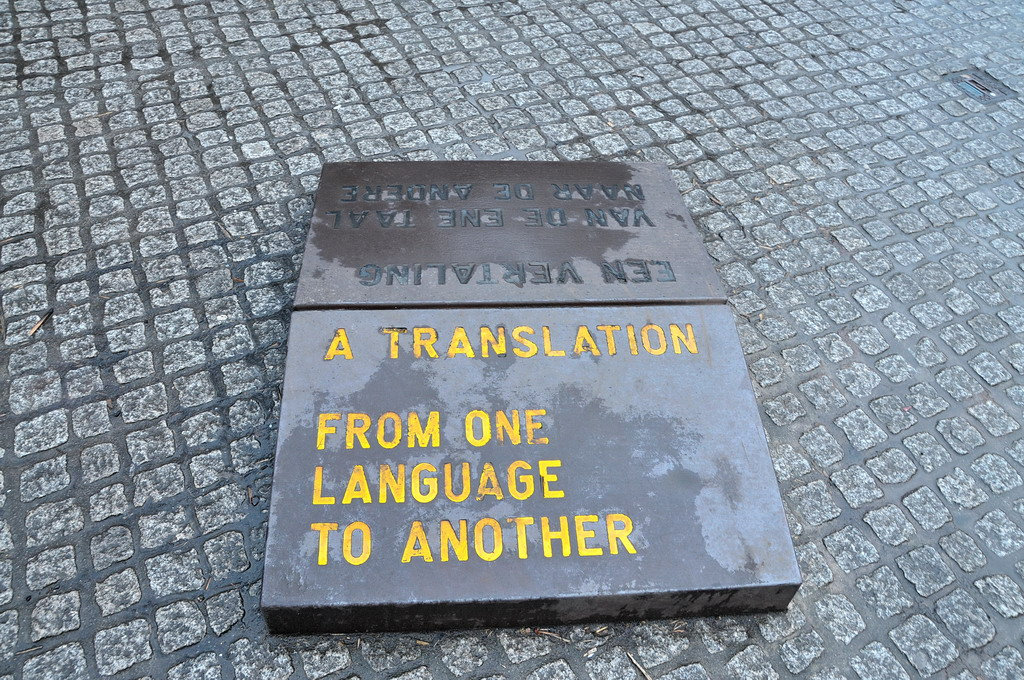
The English/Dutch piece of Een vertaling van de ene taal in de andere

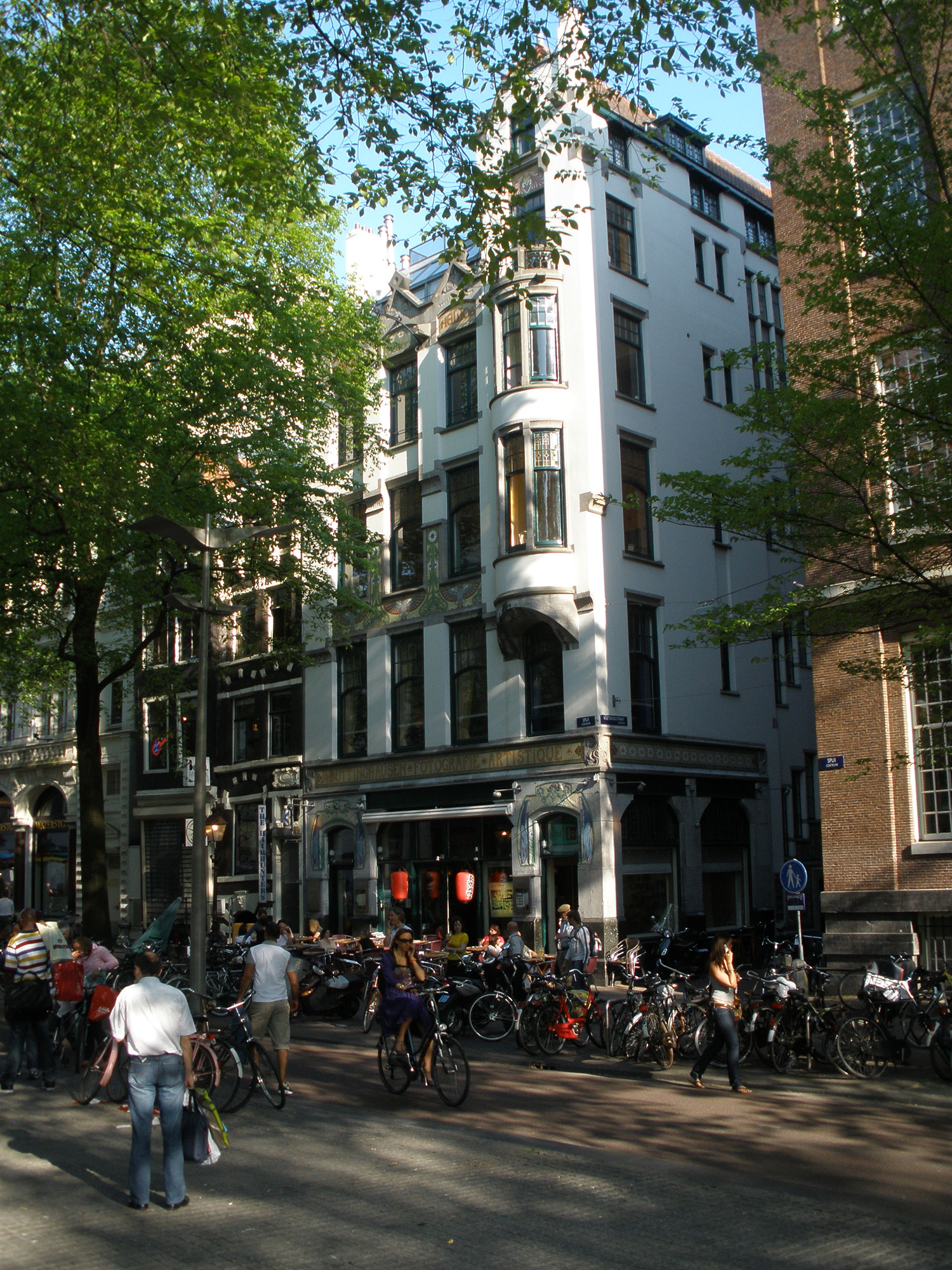
The Helios building

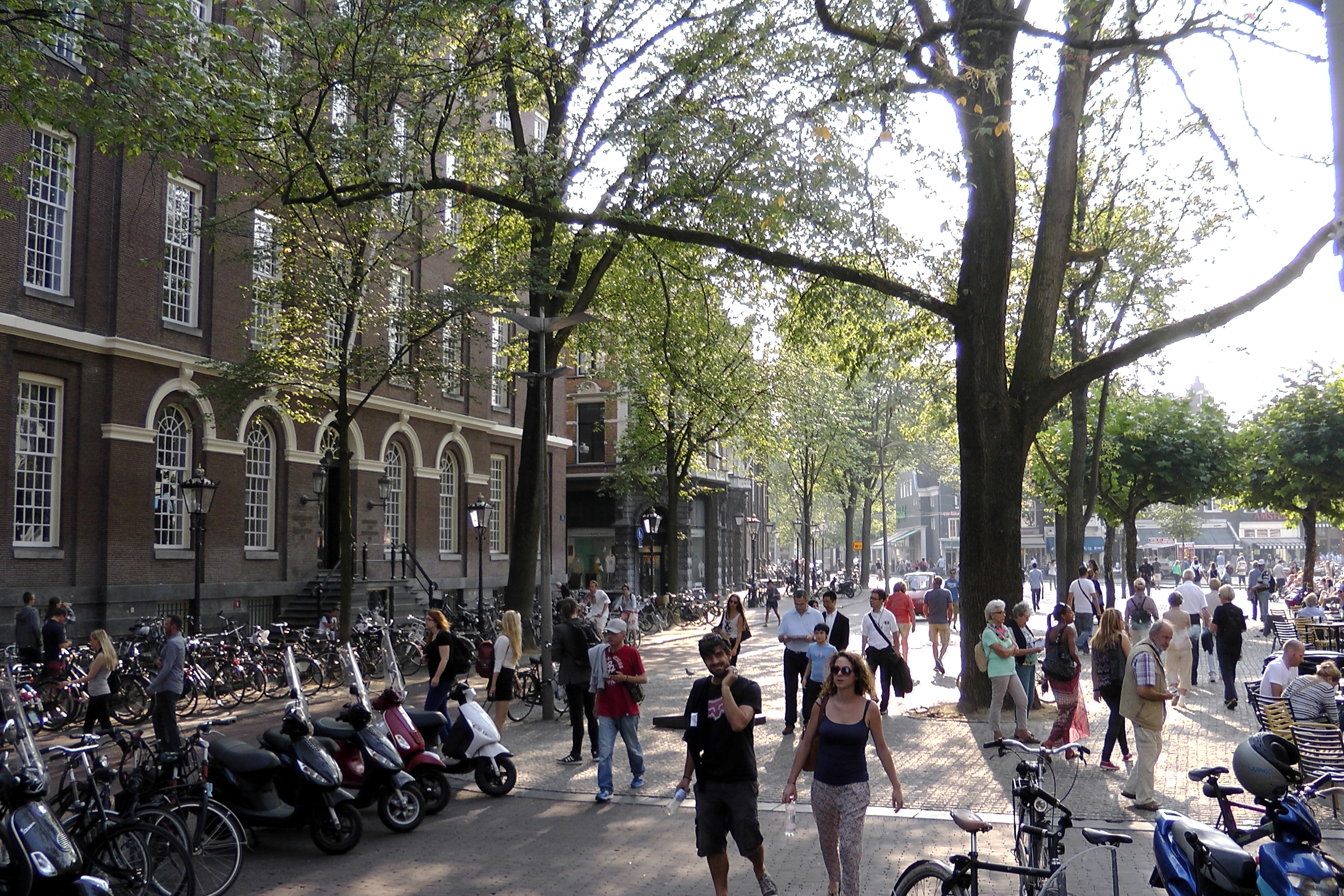
Spui in the centre of Amsterdam, summer 2013

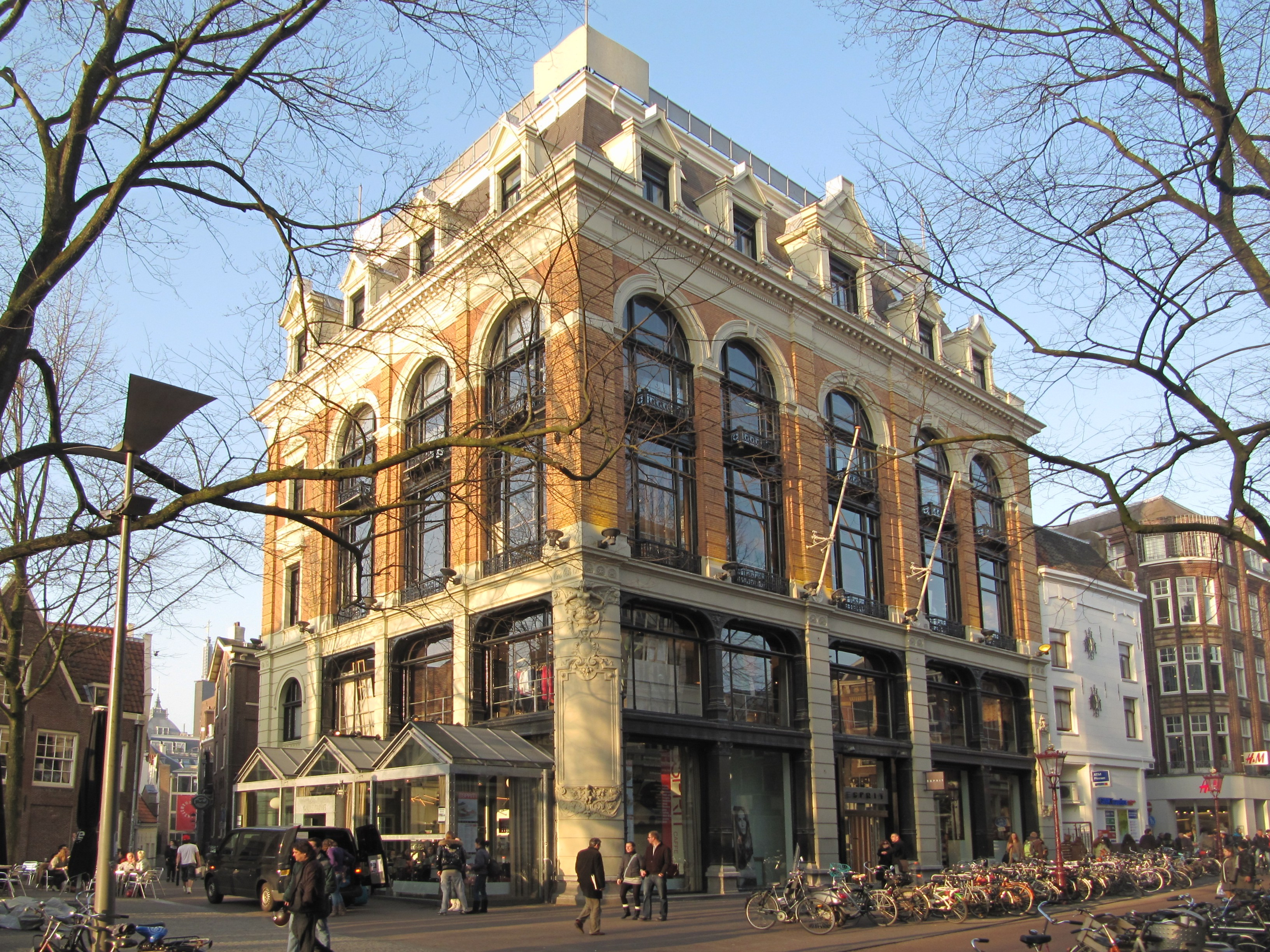
Spui 10
