= Pieter Oosterhuis =

Dutch photographer

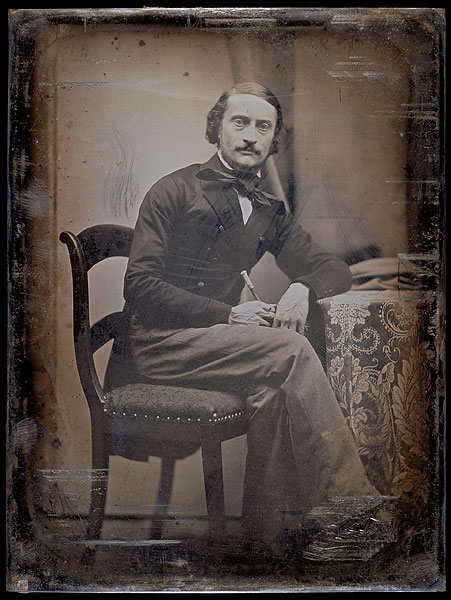
Self-portrait of Oosterhuis c. 1860.

Pieter Haatje Pieterszoon Oosterhuis (20 January 1816–6 August 1885) was a Dutch painter and photographer, one of the photography pioneers in the Netherlands.

Oosterhuis was born on 20 January 1816 in Groningen. His father, Haatje Pieters Oosterhuis, was a painter, his mother's name was Grietje Schuit. The family lived in Amsterdam.

In 1851, he opened his first studio in Amsterdam. Between 1860 and 1870, he took many photographs of the city which now count among the earliest Amsterdam photographs. He also made stereoscopic pairs of photos. After 1860, Oosterhuis also got tasks to photograph transport communications, including railways, bridges, and canals.

Oosterhuis died in Amsterdam in 1885. His son Gustaaf Oosterhuis took over the studio.

In 2021, an 1868 photograph by Oosterhuis (Railway bridge over River Lek, Culemborg) was included in the Netherlands Photo Museum's permanent exhibition Gallery of Honour of Dutch Photography, consisting of 99 photographs.

== Gallery ==
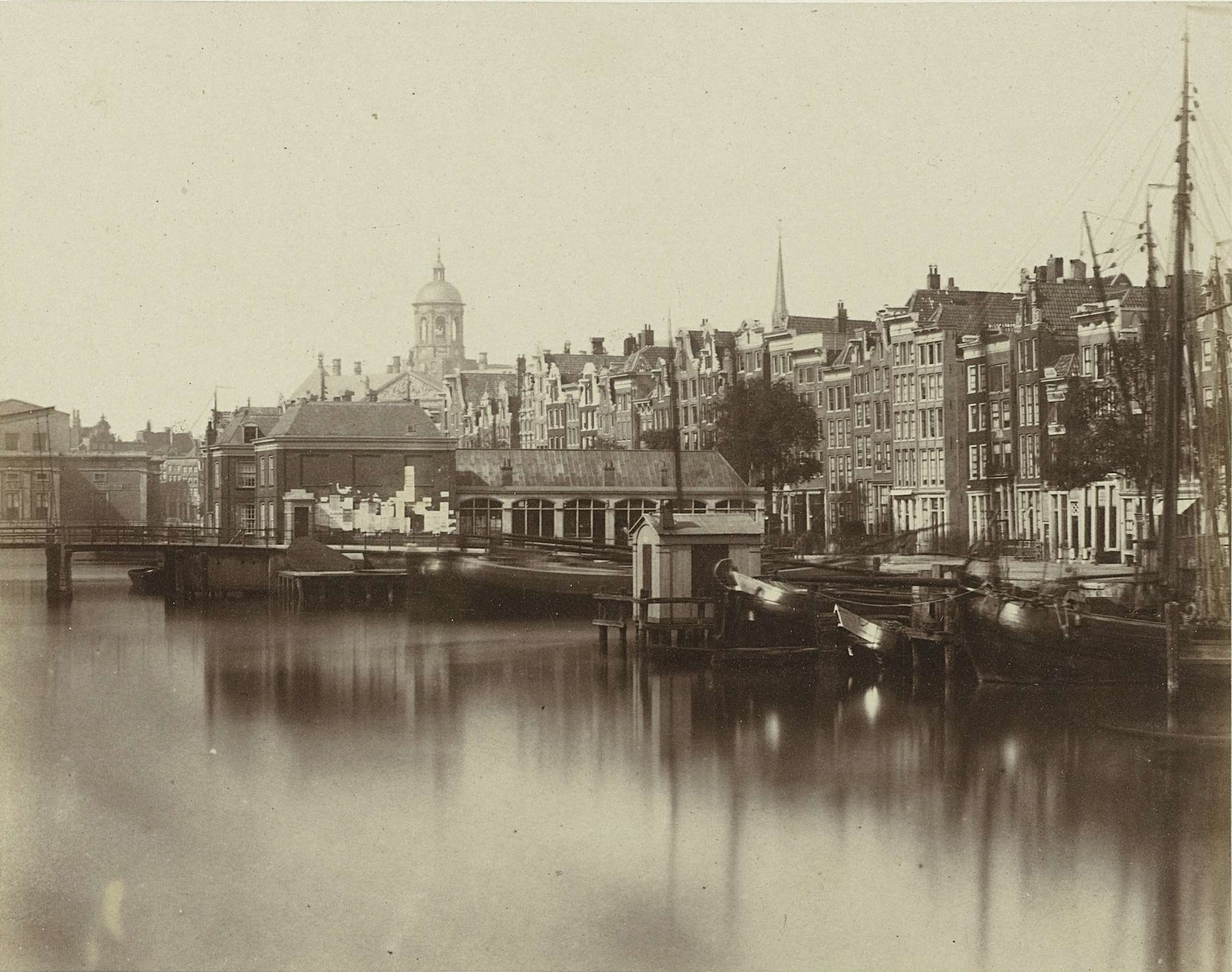
Damrak with Korenbeurs, Amsterdam, c. 1860

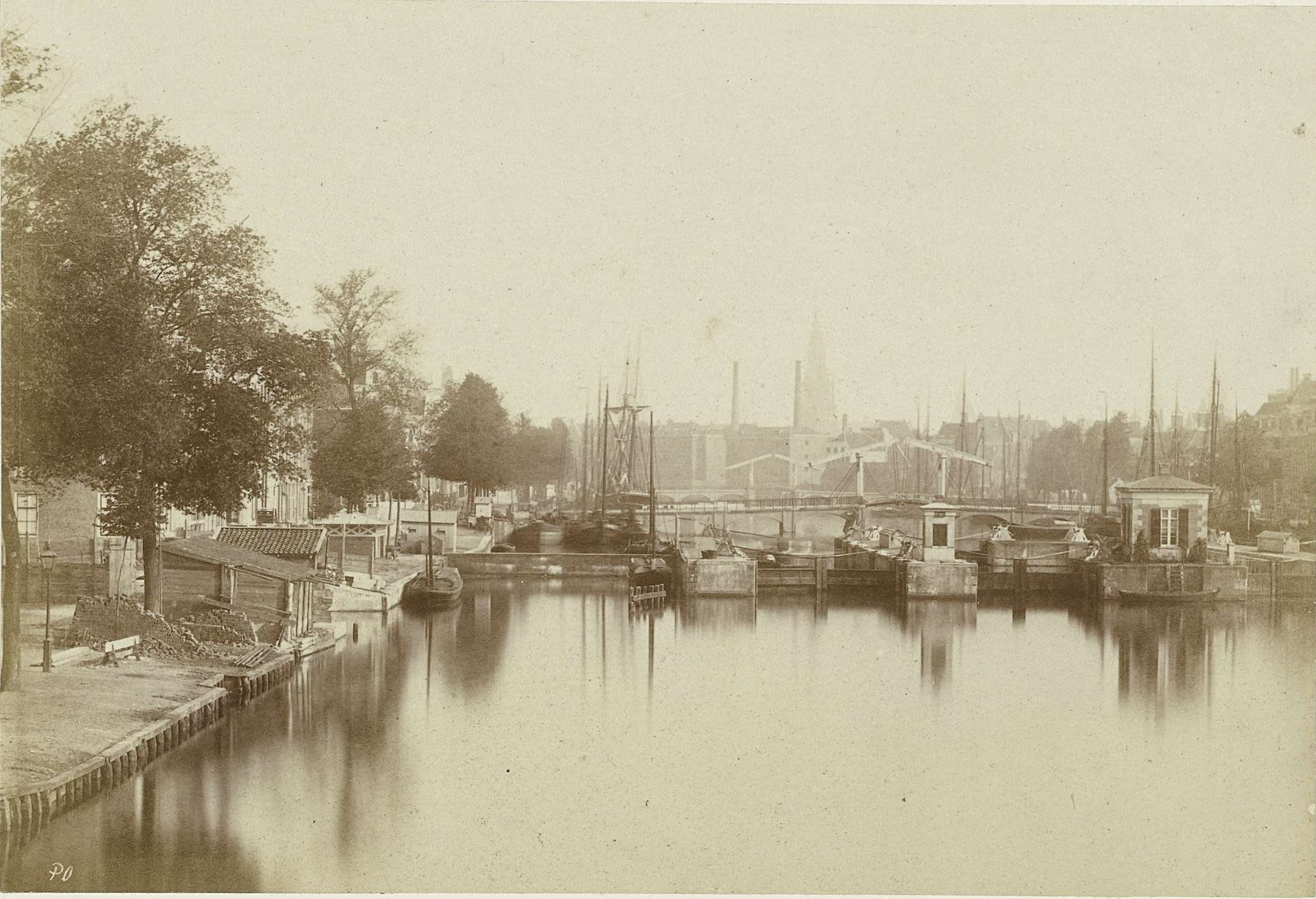
c. 1860

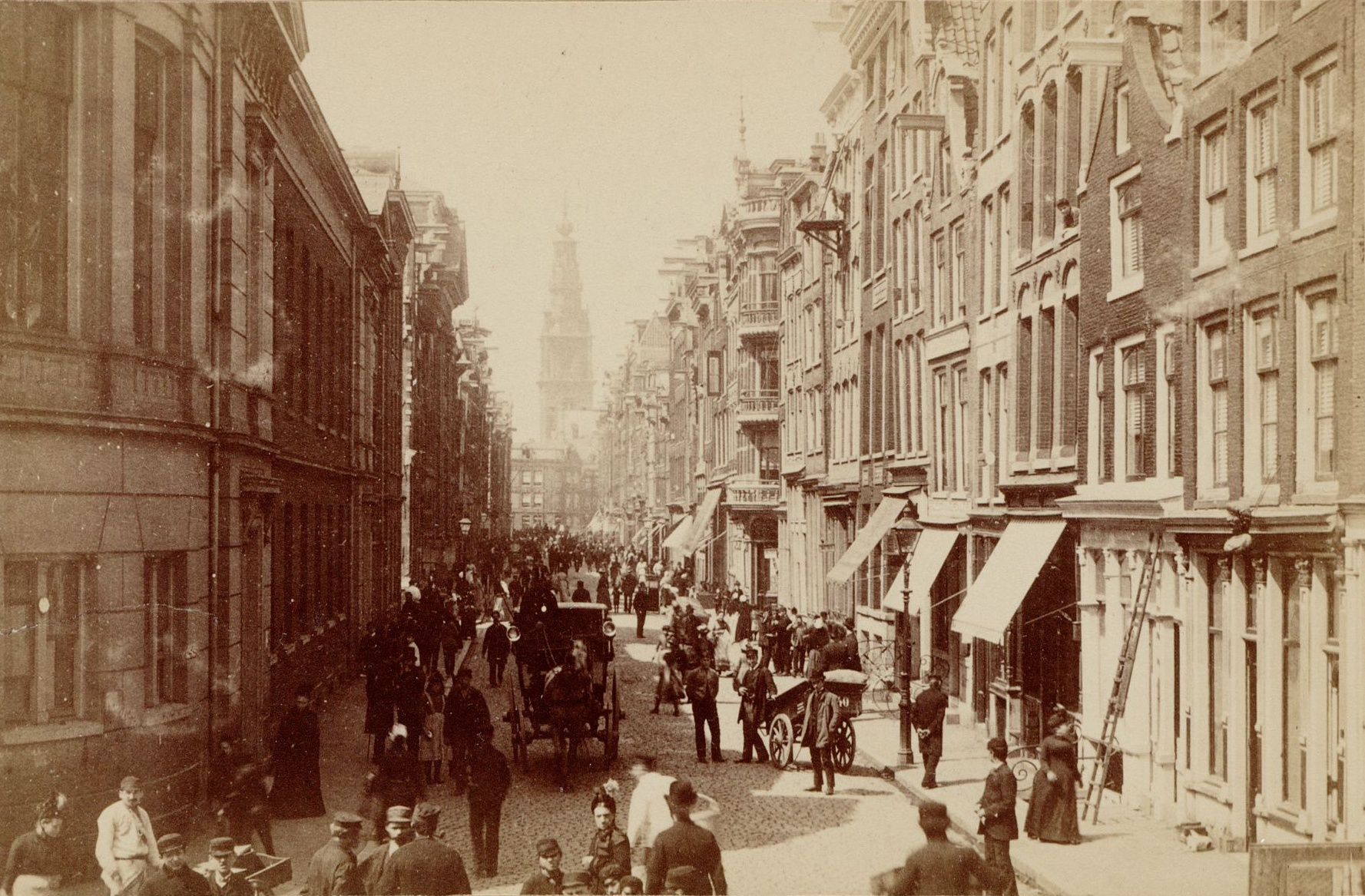
c. 1884

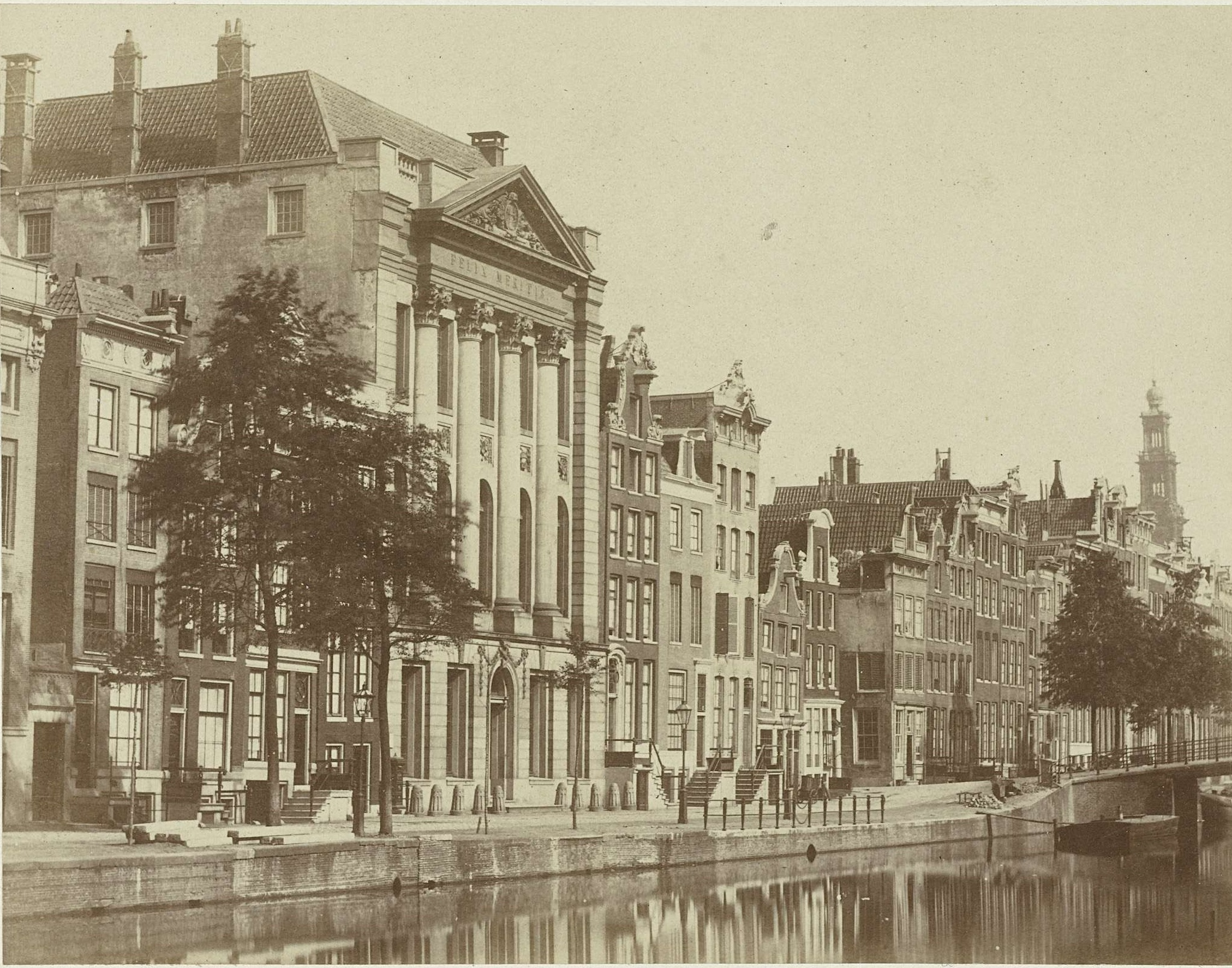
c. 1860
