= Royal Palace of Amsterdam =

Palace on Dam Square in the centre of Amsterdam, Netherlands

- Koninklijk Paleis van Amsterdam; Paleis op de Dam
- The Royal Palace of Amsterdam in 2026
- Interactive fullscreen map
- Former names: Stadhuis op de Dam

General information
- Architectural style: Dutch Baroque architecture
- Location: Amsterdam, Netherlands, Nieuwezijds Voorburg 147
- Coordinates: 52°22′23″N 4°53′29″E
- Current tenants: King Willem-Alexander
- Construction started: 1648
- Completed: 1665
- Inaugurated: 20 July 1655
- Cost: ƒ 8.5 million
- Owner: Kingdom of the Netherlands

Technical details
- Floor area: 22,031 square metres (237,140 sq ft)

Design and construction
- Architects: Jacob van Campen, Daniël Stalpaert
- Other designers: Artus Quellinus, Govert Flinck, Jacob Jordaens, Jan Lievens, Ferdinand Bol

The Royal Palace of Amsterdam in Amsterdam (Dutch: Koninklijk Paleis van Amsterdam or Paleis op de Dam) is one of three palaces in the Netherlands which are at the disposal of the monarch by Act of Parliament. It is situated on the west side of Dam Square in the centre of Amsterdam, opposite the War Memorial and next to the Nieuwe Kerk.

The palace was originally built in the mid-seventeenth century as the new city hall for the city of Amsterdam, and only became a royal palace in 1808 when the Netherlands were part of the First French Republic and First Empire under Napoleon Bonaparte.

== History ==
=== City hall ===
The old city hall was next to the Wisselbank, which in turn faced the weigh house next to the landing wharves along Damrak, which at that time would have been busy with ships. The fire on 7 July 1652 was most disastrous for the treasury of coins in the old city hall, the coins being eagerly "saved" by the helpful populace. Comparison of details of city maps before and after the fire show how construction was altered to clear buildings unaffected by the fire for an entire city block in order to create a safe buffer from other buildings and reduce the chances of fire ever again.

The current palace building was commissioned by Burgemeester Nicolaes Tulp as a large-scale construction project for a new stadhuis (city hall), even before the old one burned down in 1652. It was completed in 1656 and became an international attraction for foreign visitors and the works of art installed in various public rooms were recorded and copied by various artists.

The new stadhuis (City hall) was opened on 29 July 1655 by Cornelis de Graeff, the Burgemeester (Burgomaster or Mayor) of Amsterdam. De Graeff's son, Jacob de Graeff, laid the foundation for this along with three other children. The main architect was Jacob van Campen, who took control of the construction project in 1648. It was built on 13,659 wooden piles.

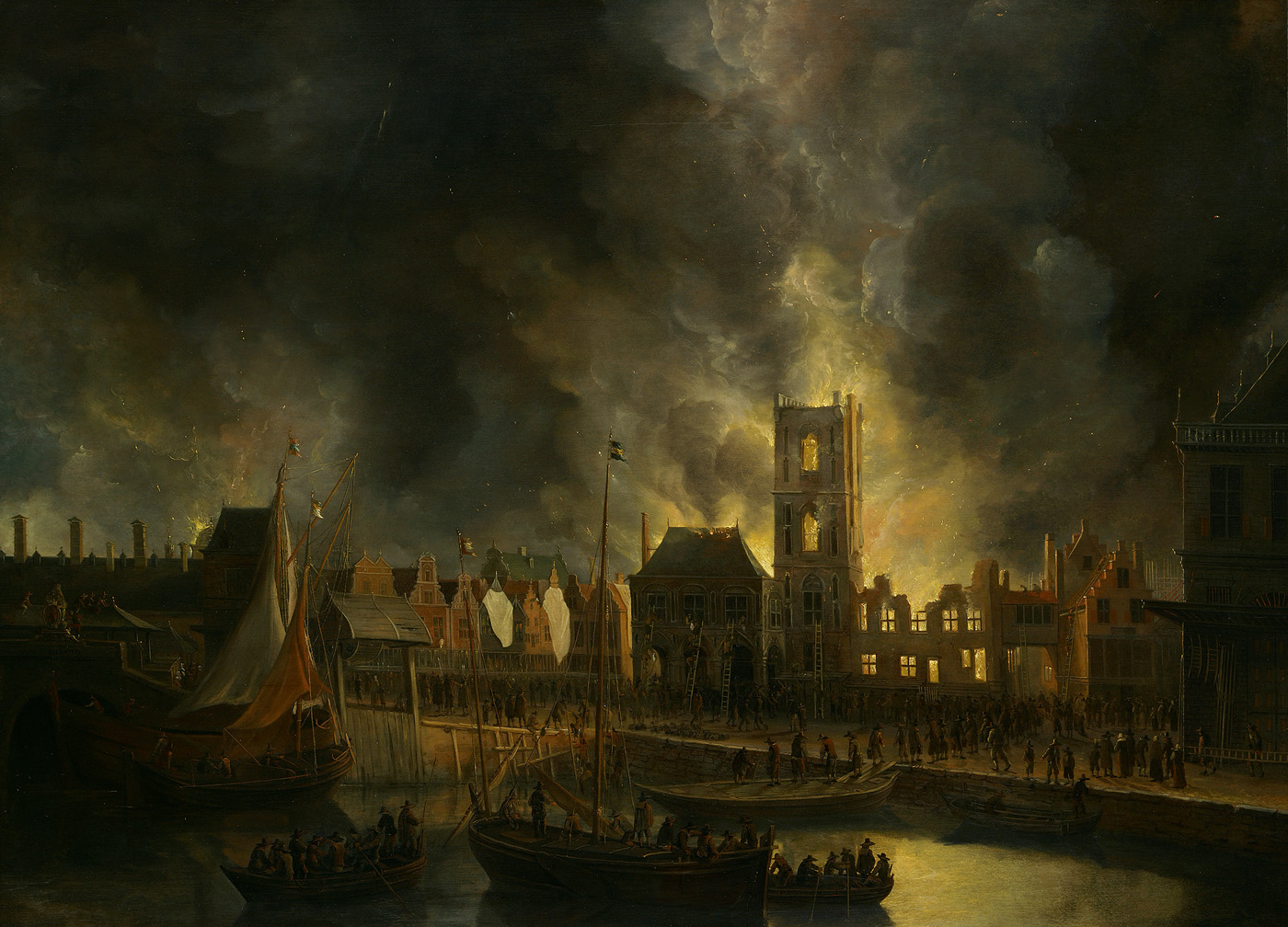
The fire in the old stadhuis (city hall),1652-1666, by Jan Abrahamsz Beerstraaten

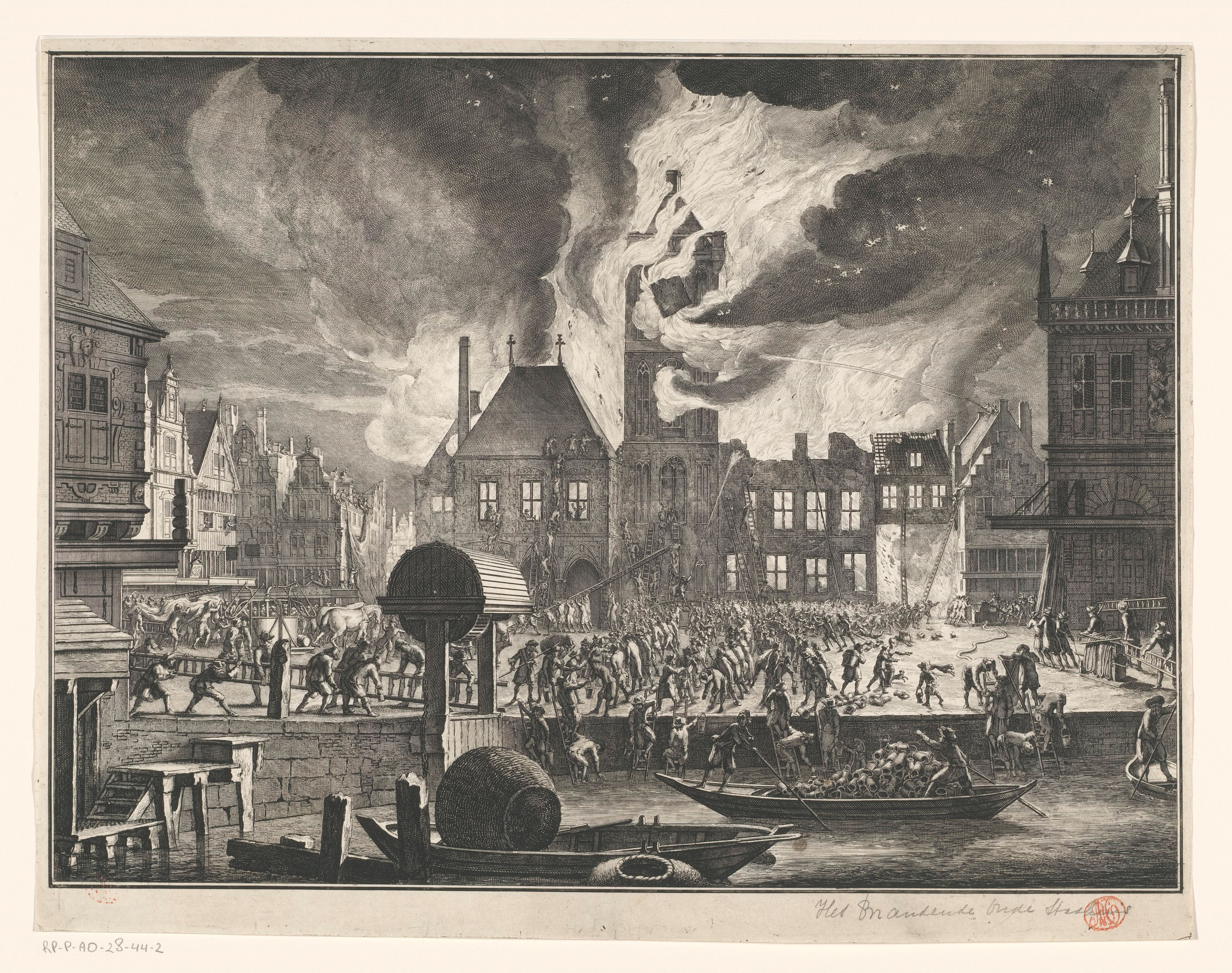
Print of the townsfolk gathering water to douse the flames, 1652-1690, by Jan van der Heyden

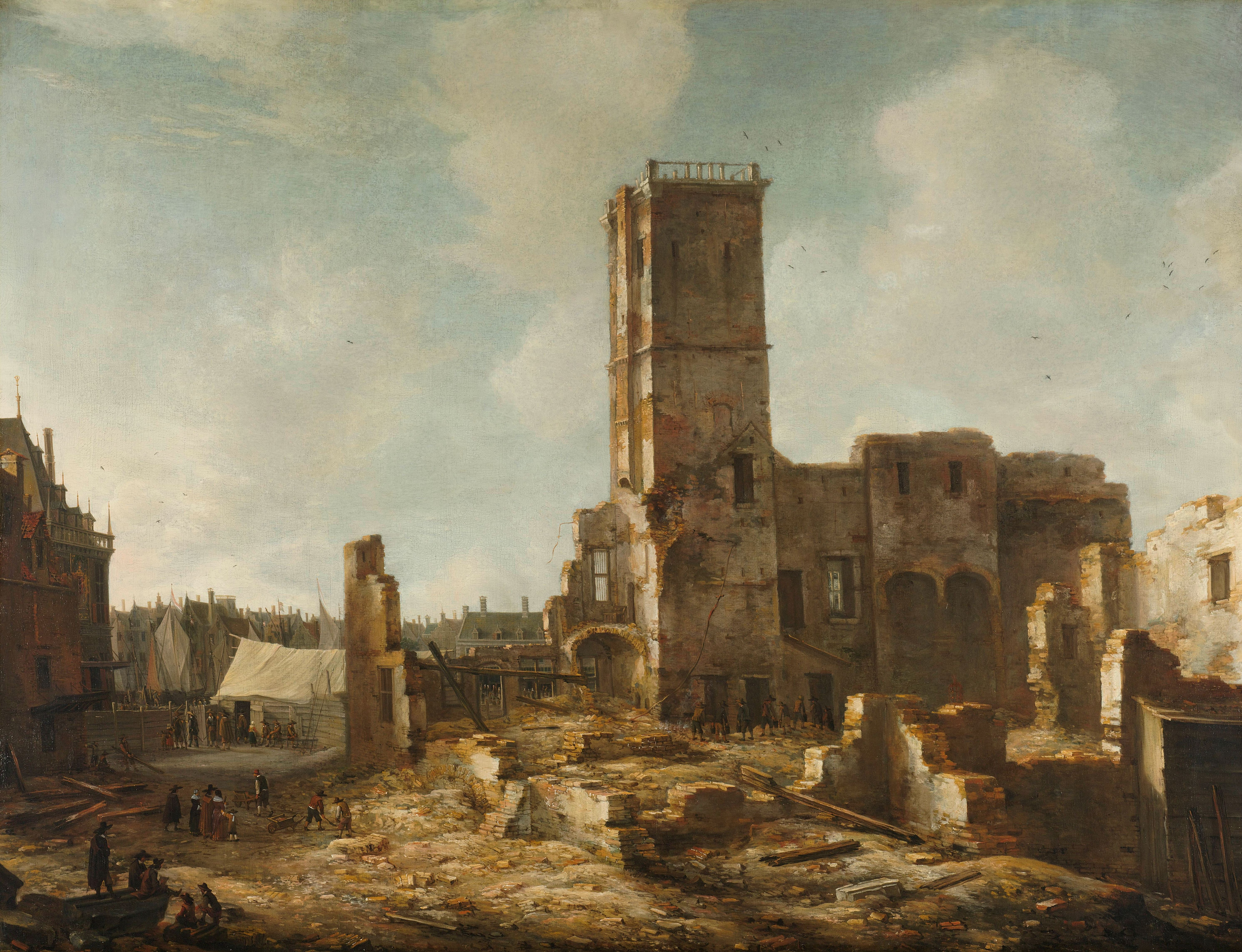
The ruins of the old city hall,1652-1666, by Jan Abrahamsz Beerstraaten
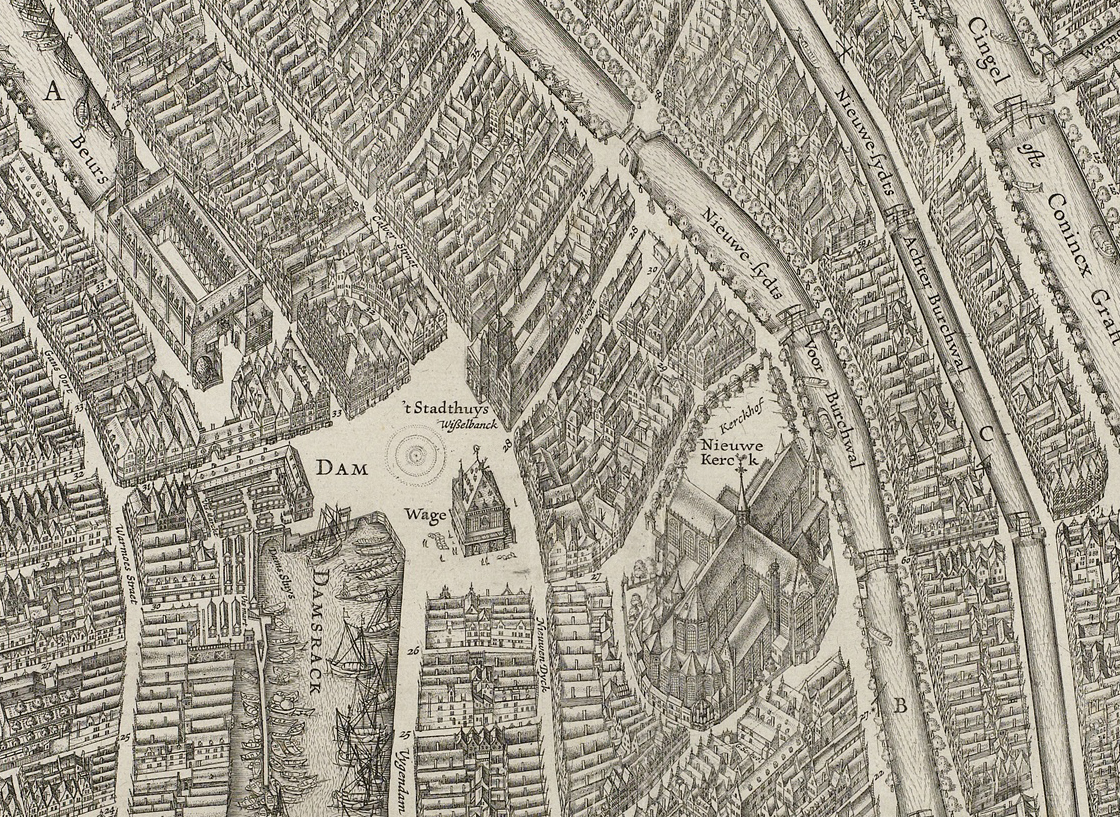
Detail of 1625 map by Balthasar Florisz. van Berckenrode

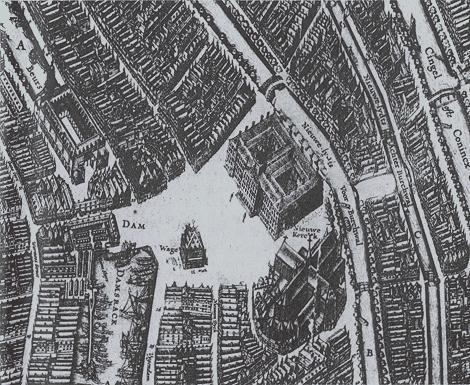
Detail of 1648 map by Balthasar Florisz. van Berckenrode

=== Palace museum and Royal Palace ===
After the patriot revolution which swept the House of Orange from power a decade earlier, the new Batavian Republic was forced to accept Louis Bonaparte as its new monarch in 1806, with the title King Louis I of Holland (Dutch: Koning Lodewijk I van Holland). The Batavian Republic was abolished at this time, in March 1806, being replaced by the Kingdom of Holland.

After initially holding his court at The Hague and Utrecht, King Louis I moved to Amsterdam in 1808 and the city hall was turned into his royal palace. Louis converted the public rooms of the city hall into a national museum under the direction of Cornelis Apostool. The collection of the national museum had been formed by Alexander Gogel in The Hague after the contents of the Prince Willem V Gallery had been shipped to the Louvre in 1795. This 'National Art Gallery' collection was first shown in Huis ten Bosch from 1800. That museum, already an attraction for its Oranjezaal, exhibited around 200 paintings and historic objects from the collections of the Dutch stadtholders.

In 1805, this National Art Gallery moved to the still-empty Prince Willem V Gallery, on the Buitenhof. In 1806, on the orders of the new monarch, King Louis, the collection moved to the royal palace building in 1808. The motivation was to secure the collection from being abducted once again to the Louvre. Prominent paintings of national importance owned by Amsterdam, such as The Night Watch by Rembrandt, became part of the collection and in 1809, the museum opened its doors to the public. To improve the view from the palace, King Louis ordered the deconstruction of the old weigh house in 1808, which had already been partially replaced in its function by the Waag before the fire of 1652. By the 19th century, most boat traffic to the Damrak was no longer for goods but for people.

After the fall of Napoleon and the creation of the Kingdom of the Netherlands in 1815, it became a palace of the Dutch Royal House. The public floors still function as a museum and are open to the public most days of the year.

Today, the palace complex is used by the monarch for entertaining and official functions during state visits and other official receptions, such as New Year receptions. The award ceremonies of the Erasmus Prize, of the Silver Carnation, of the Royal Awards for Modern Painting, and of the Prince Claus Awards are also held in the Royal Palace. It was made a property of the Kingdom of the Netherlands in 1936. The balcony of the Royal Palace was used during the investiture of Queen Beatrix in 1980, where her mother, Juliana, announced the new queen to the people. In 2013 Beatrix herself abdicated and, on the same balcony, she announced the new king, her son Willem-Alexander.

The palace was renovated from 2005 until June 2009, during which, among other things, asbestos was removed. The palace has been open again to visitors since 14 June 2009.

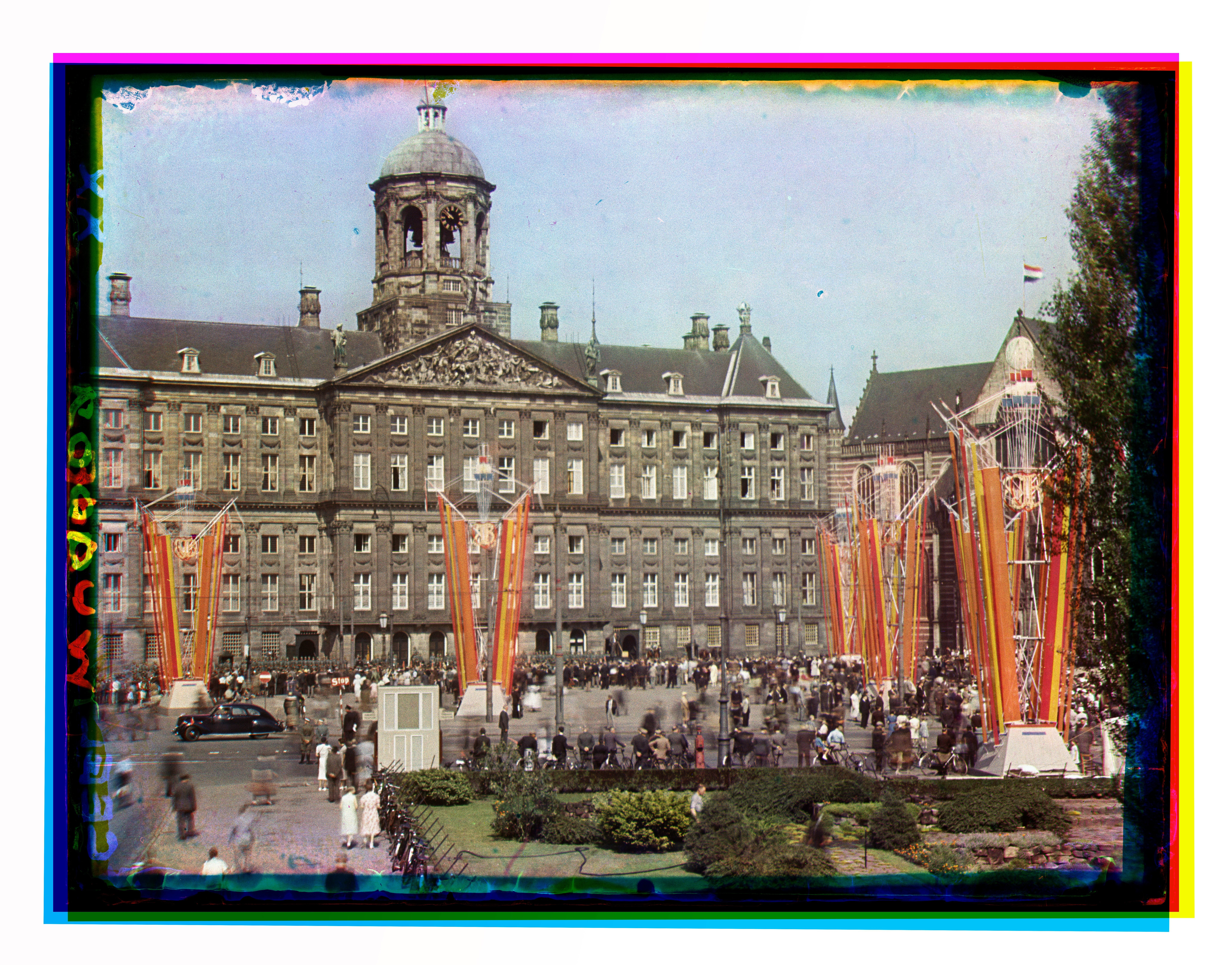
The Royal Palace of Amsterdam in 1937

== Notable features ==
The sandstone of yellowish hue has darkened considerably in the course of time. Astride the rear of the building is a 6-metre-tall statue of Atlas carrying the Globe on his shoulders.

As the building was designed as a city hall, it lacks a grand entrance, which is a rather common feature of most royal palaces.

== Gallery ==
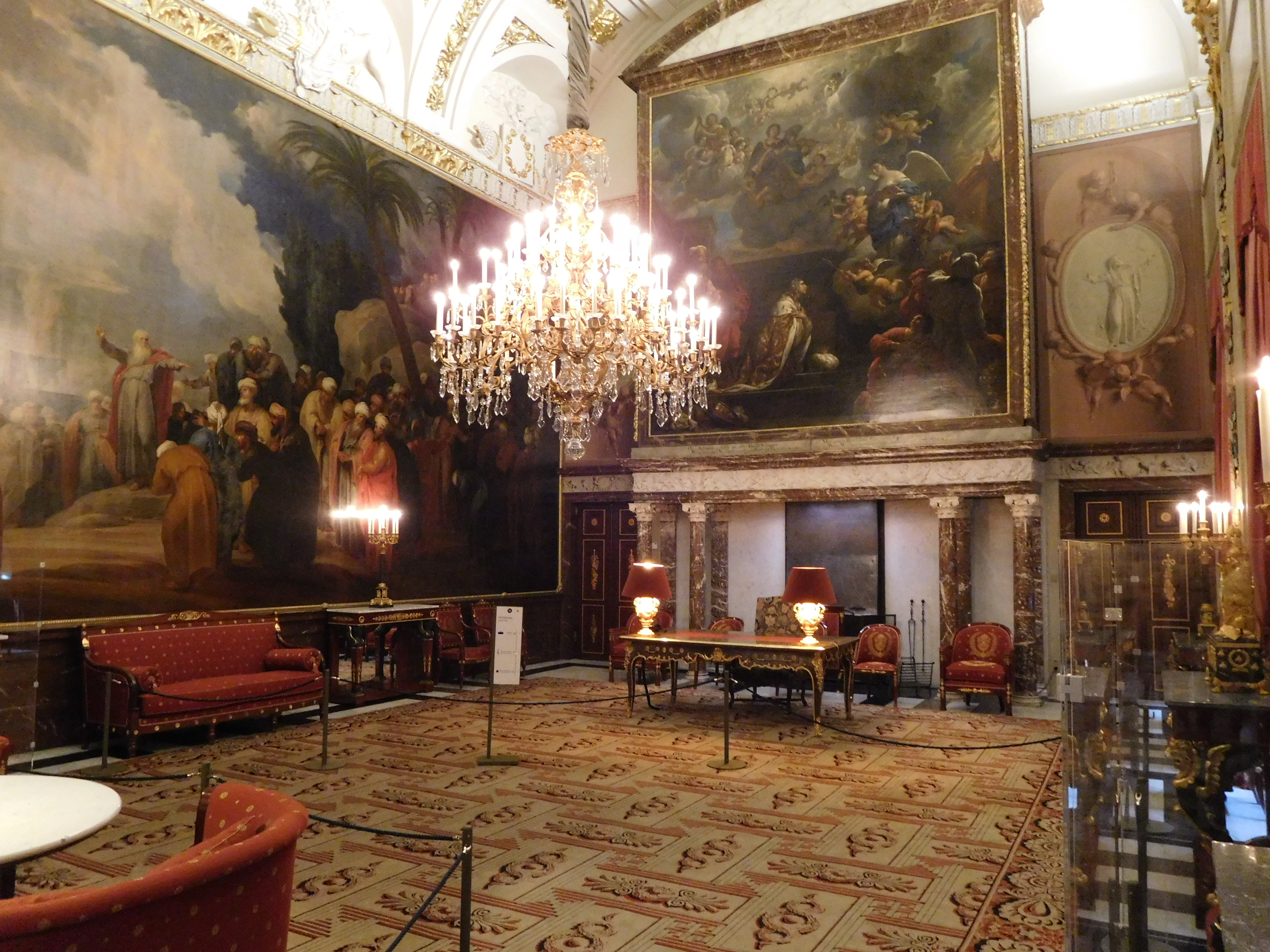
Moses Room

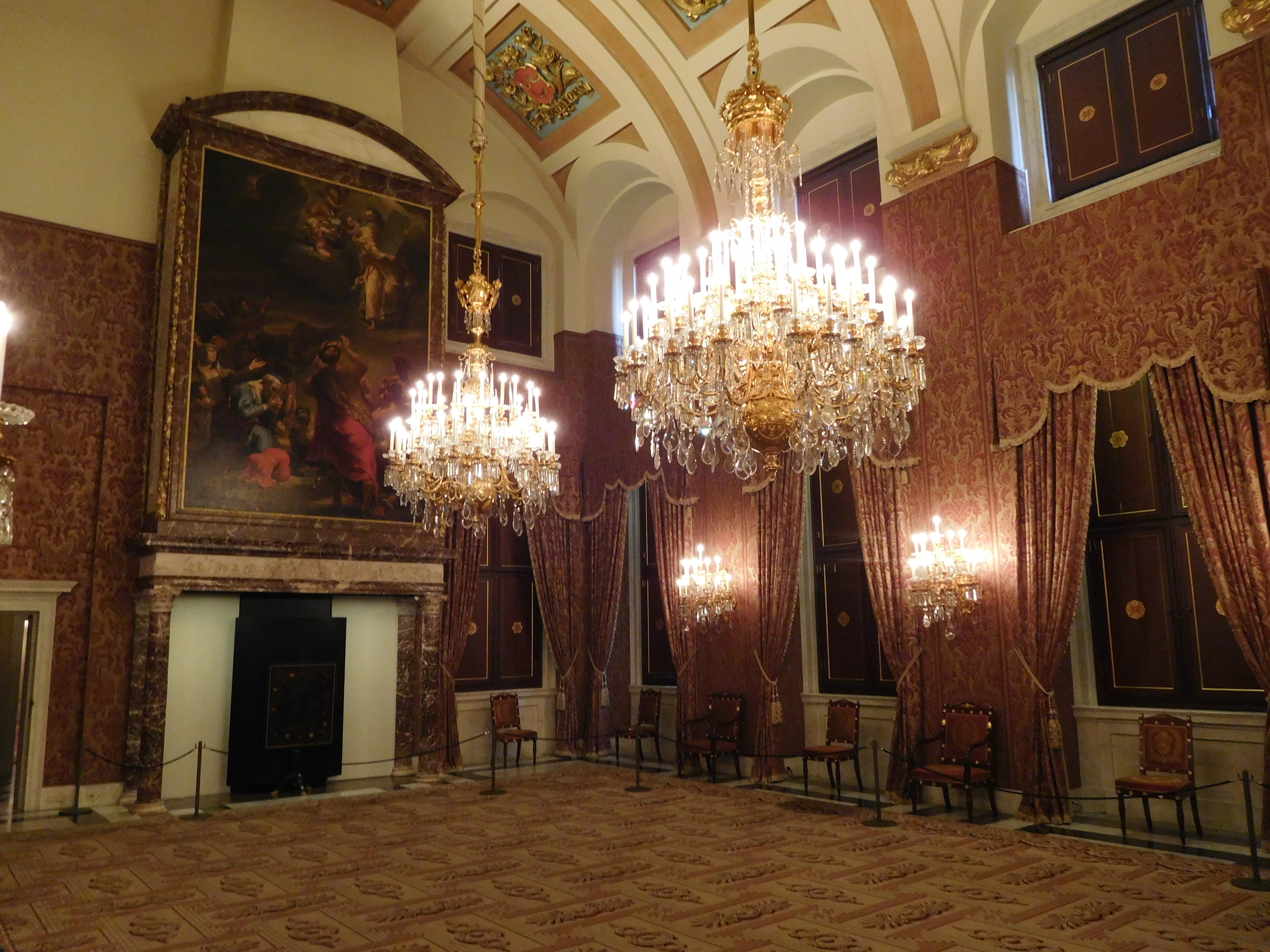
Schepen Room

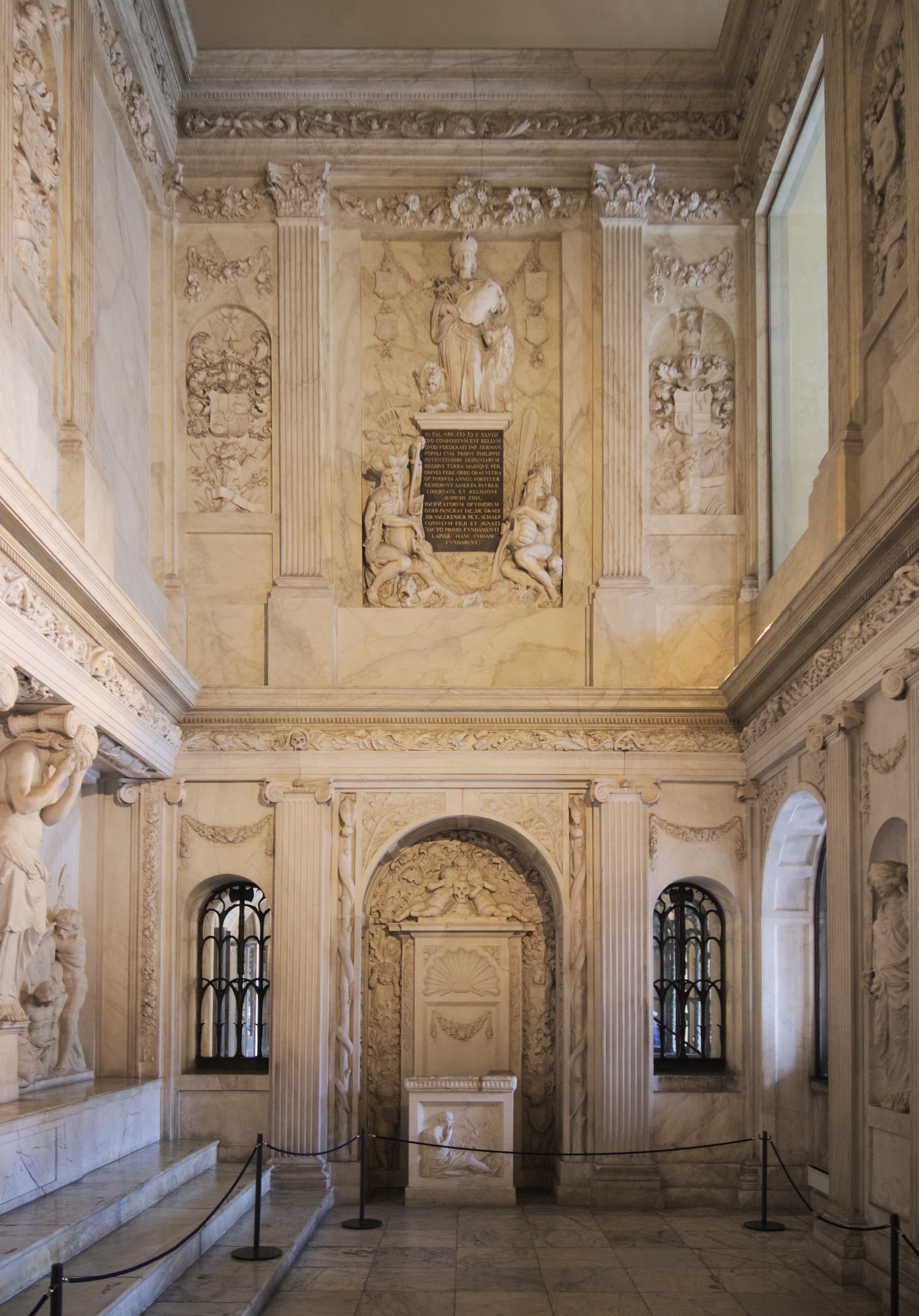
Vierschaar

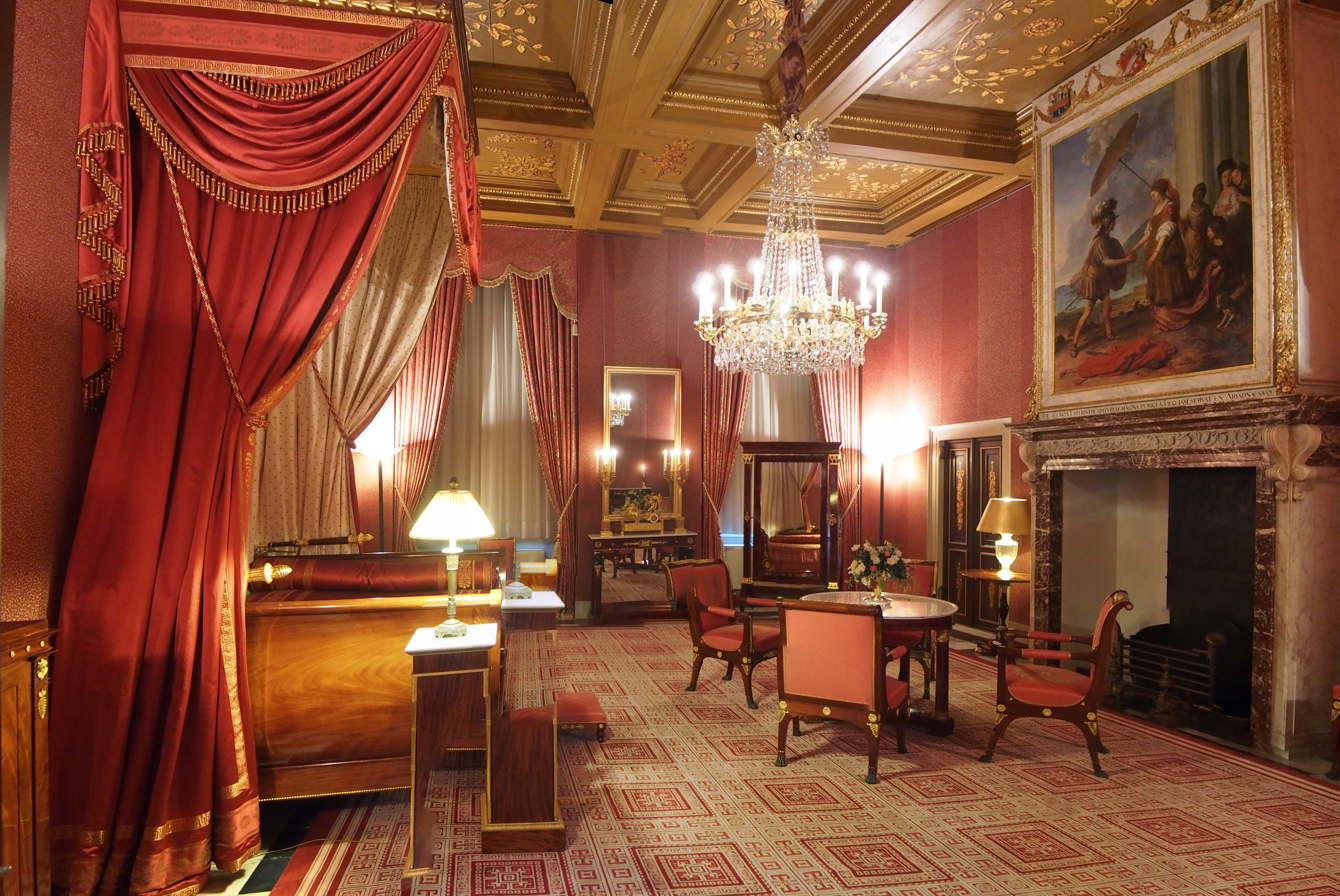
Bedroom of King Louis Bonaparte

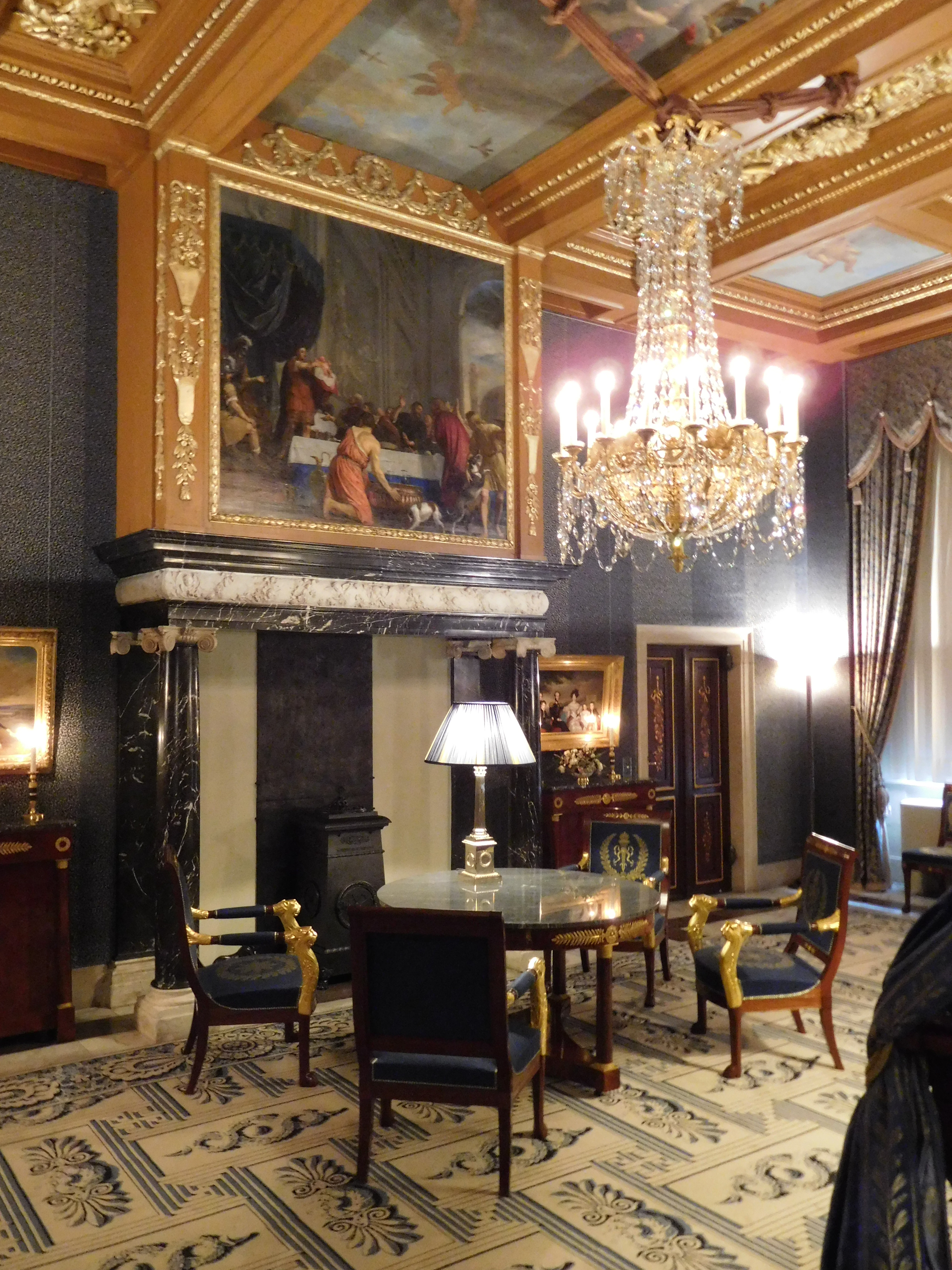
A sitting room

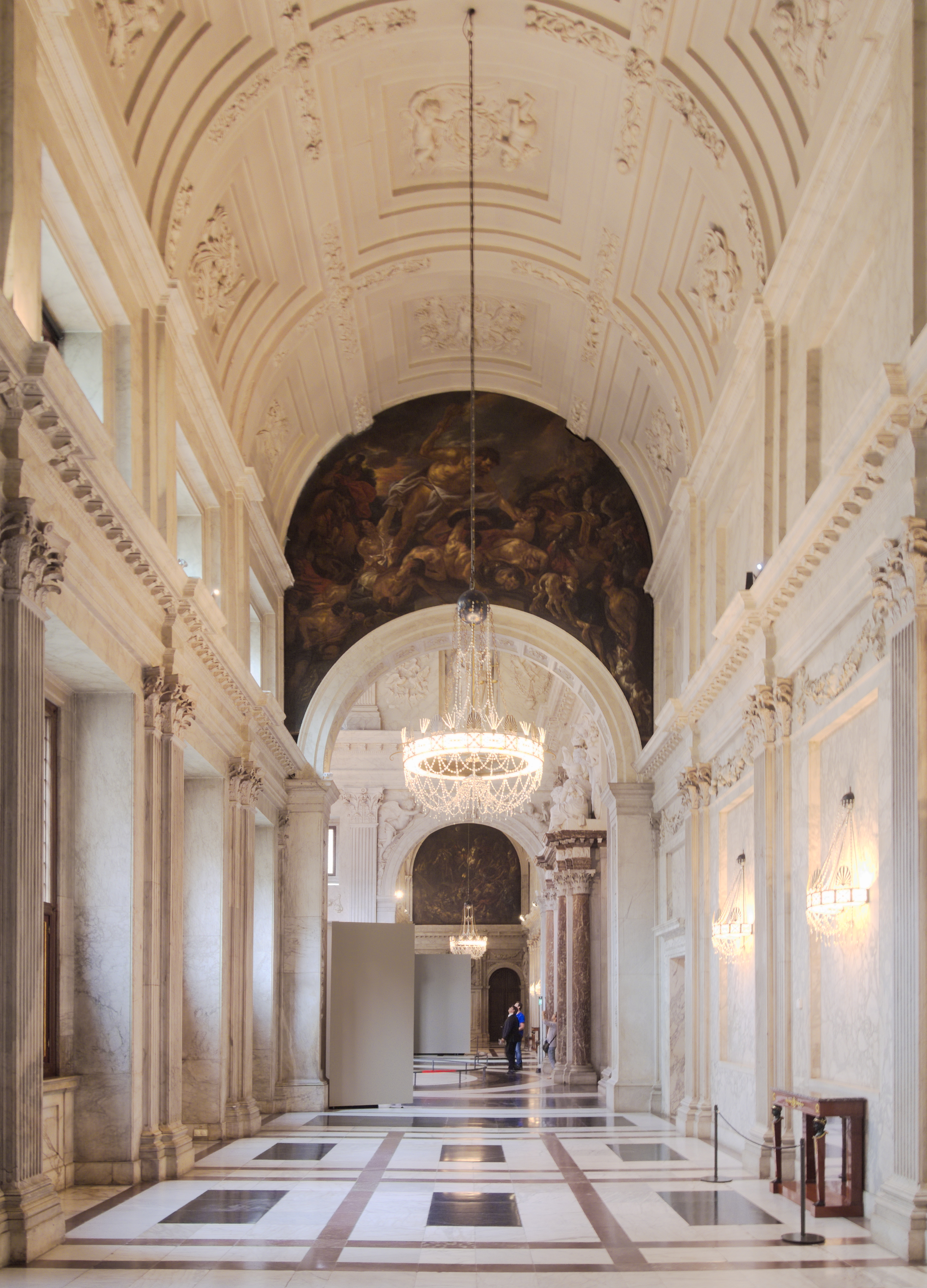
Main hallway

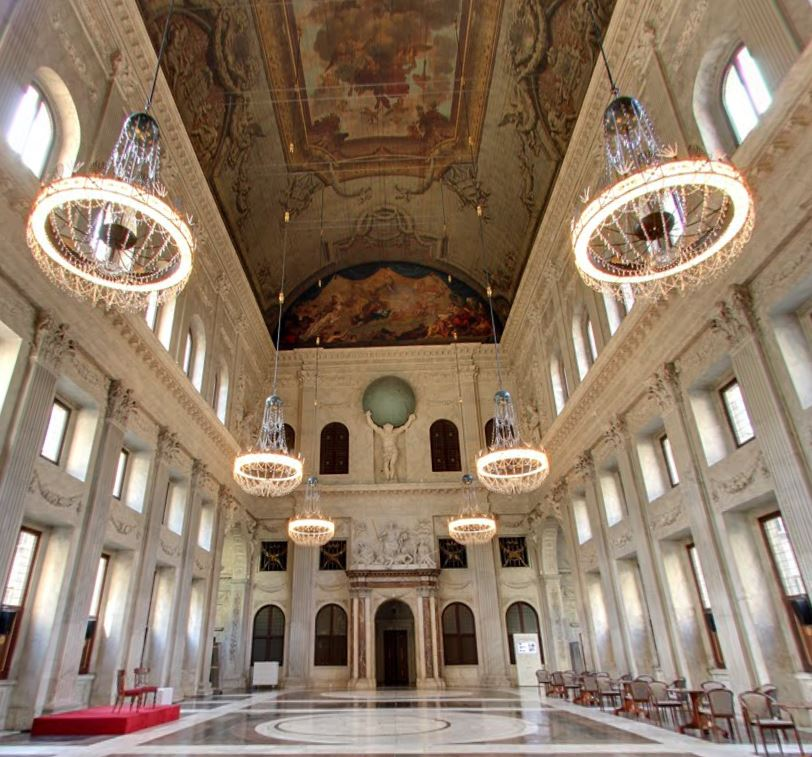
The central hall of the palace

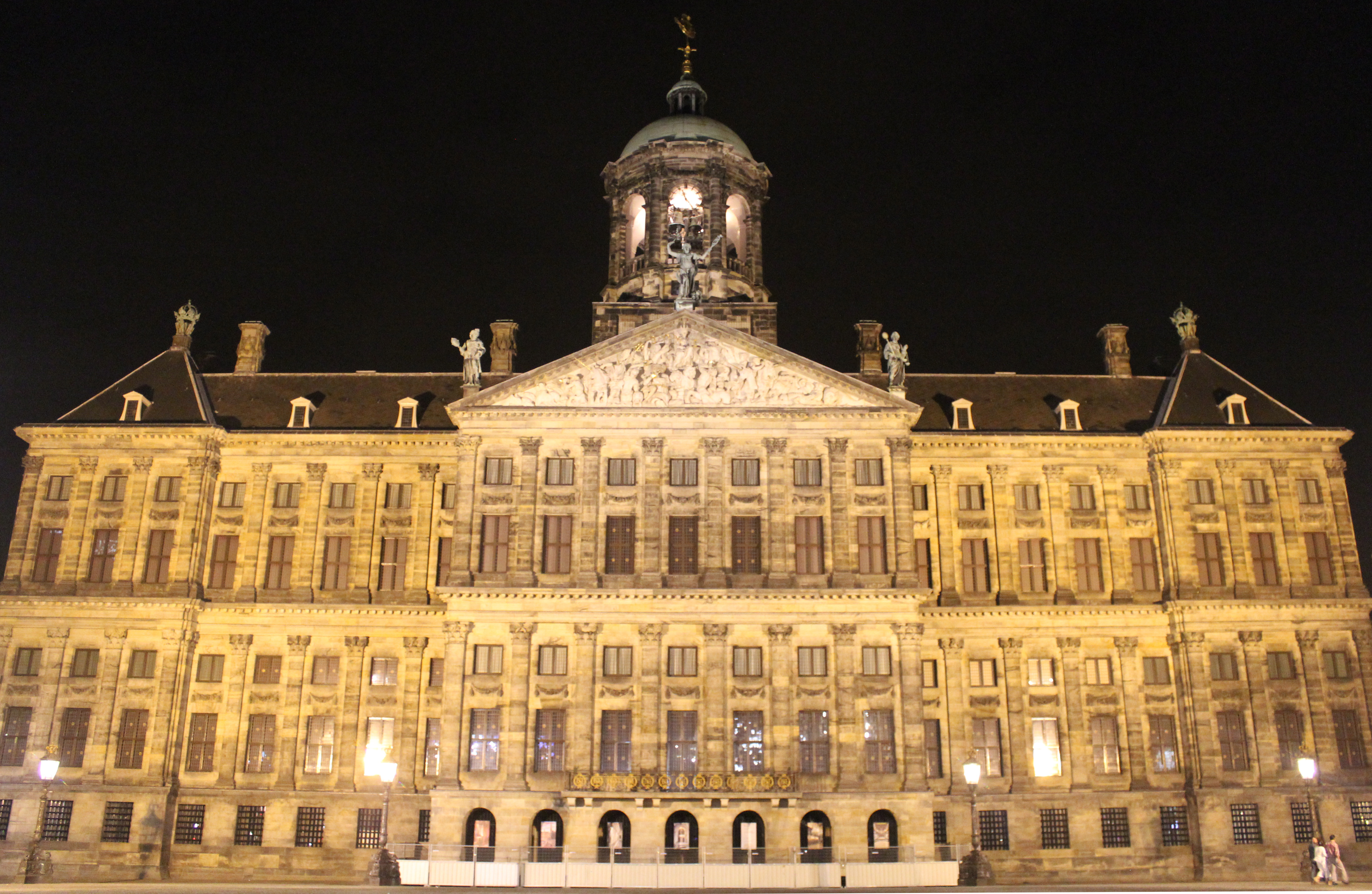
Front side
