= Madame Tussauds Amsterdam =

Wax museum in the Netherlands

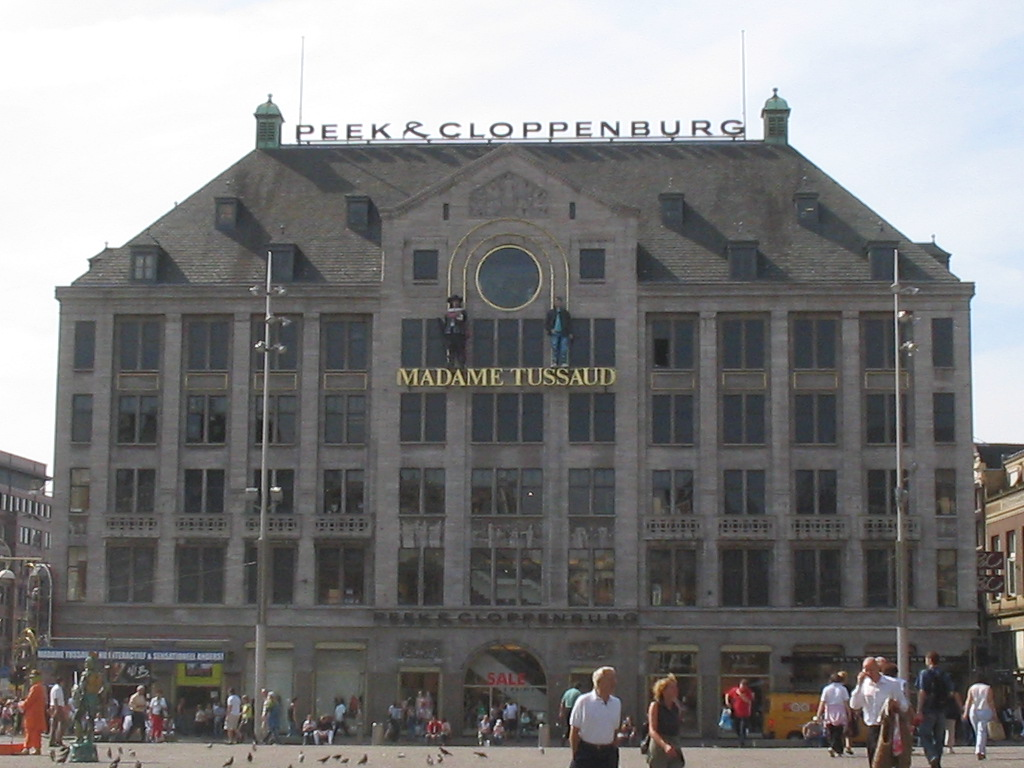
- The front façade of Madame Tussauds Amsterdam
- Established: 19 February 1970
- Location: Dam Square, near the Royal Palace of Amsterdam
- Coordinates: 52°22′21″N 4°53′33″E
- Type: Wax museum
- Founder: Josephine Tussaud
- Owner: The Tussauds Group
- Website: www.madametussauds.com/amsterdam

Madame Tussauds Amsterdam is a wax museum situated in Amsterdam, the capital city of the Netherlands. It is located in the centre of the city on Dam Square, near the Royal Palace of Amsterdam. Founded in 1970, it was the first Madame Tussauds that was opened in mainland Europe as well as being the first foreign branch of the British institution. The collection of Madame Tussauds Amsterdam consists of a collection of wax figures of famous celebrities in different categories such as the Golden Age of Dutch history, music, sport and film.

== History ==
Building

The building that houses Madame Tussauds Amsterdam was designed by the Dutch architect A.J. Joling, in the Um 1800 style, and was constructed between 1914 and 1917. On April 11, 1917, it opened its doors as the second Peek & Cloppenburg store in the Netherlands. Eighty four years later the building was designated as a rijksmonument.

Museum

The idea to establish a wax museum in Amsterdam came from Josephine Tussaud (1900–1985), businesswoman and great-great-granddaughter of Madame Tussauds founder Marie Tussaud. These museum was founded on February 19, 1970, under the name of Madame Tussauds Amsterdam by The Tussauds Group. Approximately one year later, the museum first opened its doors at the main commercial street Kalverstraat becoming the first Madame Tussauds Wax Museum outside the United Kingdom. Twenty years after it first opened its doors to the public in 1991, Madame Tussauds Amsterdam moved into the upper floors of the building of the international chain of clothing stores Peek & Cloppenburg at the Dam Square. The following twenty years the museum was modernised in January 2012, and since then it includes interactive themes.

== Collection ==
Madame Tussaud's Amsterdam has a collection of life-size statues, divided into categories. Here some examples:

- Personalities of the royal family: Lady Diana, William of Orange, the Dutch king Willem-Alexander, the Dutch queen consort Máxima, the former Dutch Queen Wilhelmina, among others.
- World (political) leaders: the Dalai Lama, Mahatma Gandhi, Nelson Mandela, Barack Obama, Nicolas Sarkozy, among others.
- Personalities of cinema: Angelina Jolie, Brad Pitt, Sean Connery, Charlie Chaplin, Marilyn Monroe, Nicolas Cage, Jennifer Lopez, George Clooney, Hannibal Lecter, among others.
- Personalities in the music industry: Elvis Presley, Bob Marley, Michael Jackson, Madonna, Robbie Williams, Christina Aguilera, Lady Gaga, Beyoncé, Adele, Justin Bieber, Taylor Swift, Ariana Grande, Armin van Buuren, Tiësto, Hardwell, Afrojack, Martin Garrix among others.
- Personalities in art, science and culture: Albert Einstein, Pablo Picasso, Salvador Dalí, Leonardo da Vinci, Vincent van Gogh, Rembrandt, among others.
- Fashion personalities: Naomi Campbell, Nikkie de Jager, among others
- Sports personalities: David Beckham, Wayne Rooney, Lionel Messi, Jutta Leerdam among others.
- Marvel superheroes: the Avengers (Captain America, Iron Man, Thor, Hulk), Spider-Man, among others.
- Influencer Enzo Knol
