= Korenbeurs =

Korenbeurs may refer to:

- Korenbeurs (Amsterdam), a 17th-century commodity market in Amsterdam
- Korenbeurs (Groningen), a neoclassical building in Groningen
