= Dam Square =

Town square in Amsterdam

- Dam Square, 2026

- Location within Amsterdam
- Native name: Dam (Dutch)
- Location: Centrum, Amsterdam, Netherlands
- Postal code: 1012 JS/NP
- Nearest metro station: Rokin
- Coordinates: 52°22′23″N 4°53′34″E
- North: Nieuwendijk, Damrak, Warmoesstraat
- East: Damstraat
- South: Kalverstraat, Rokin, Nes (nl)
- West: Mozes en Aäronstraat, Paleisstraat

Construction
- Inauguration: 1275; 751 years ago

Dam Square, also known as the Dam (Dutch pronunciation: [dɑm]), is a town square in Amsterdam, the capital (Note: Amsterdam is the constitutional capital, while the government and the royal family are seated in The Hague) and most populous city of the Netherlands. Its notable buildings and frequent events make it one of the best-known and most important locations in the city and the country.

== Location and description ==
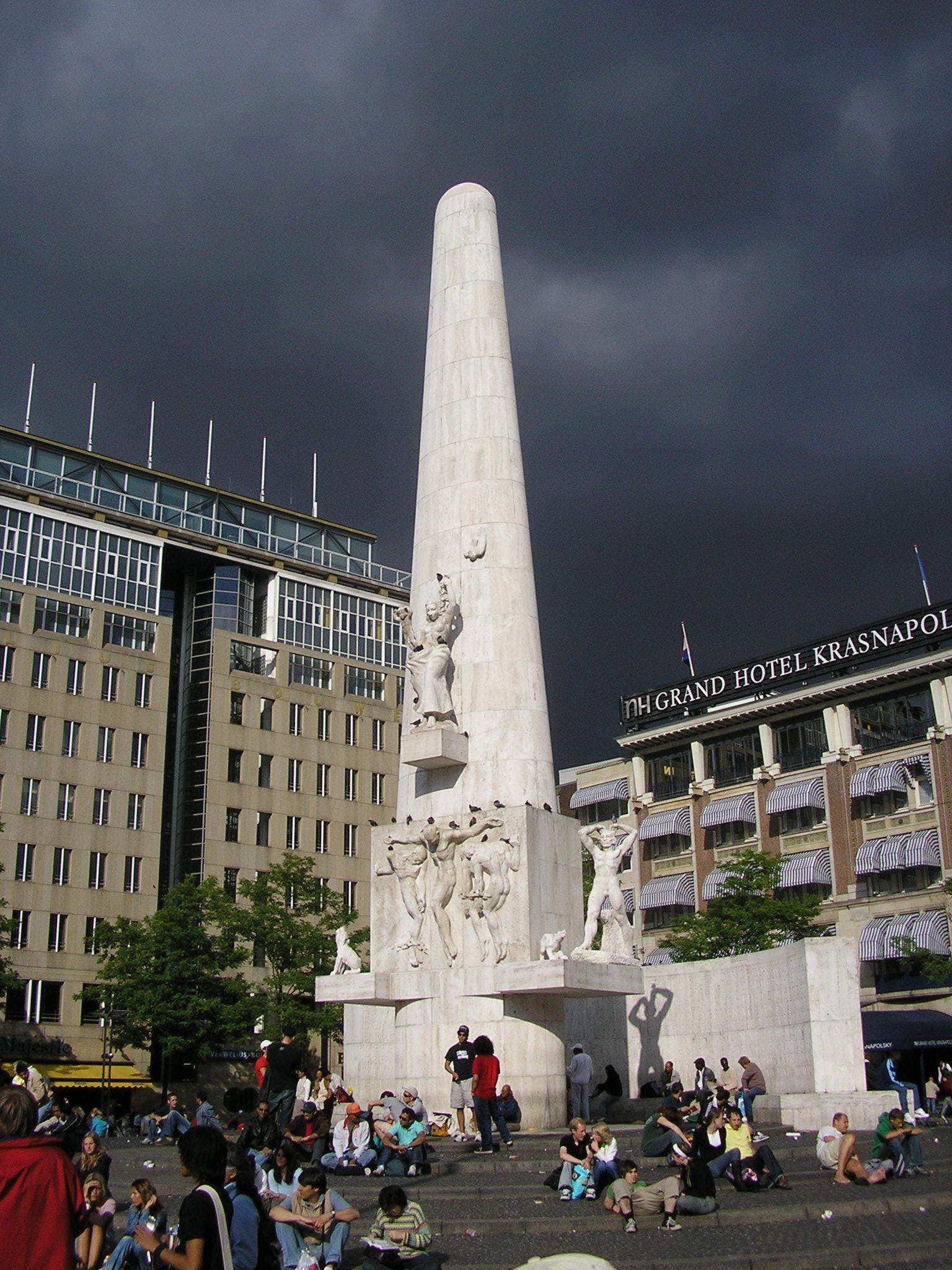
National Monument, with the Hotel Krasnapolsky on the right

Dam Square lies in the historical center of Amsterdam, approximately 750 metres (2,500 ft) south of the main transportation hub, Centraal Station, at the original location of the dam in the river Amstel. It is roughly rectangular in shape, stretching about 200 metres (650 ft) from west to east and about 100 metres (350 ft) from north to south. It links the streets Rokin and Damrak, which run along the original course of the Amstel River from Muntplein (Mint Square) and the Munttoren (Mint Tower) towards Centraal Station.The Dam also marks the endpoint of the other well-traveled streets Nieuwendijk, Kalverstraat and Damstraat. A short distance beyond the northeast corner lies the main red-light district: De Wallen.

On the west end of the square is the neoclassical Royal Palace, which served as the city hall from 1655 until its conversion to a royal residence in 1808. Beside it are the 15th-century Gothic Nieuwe Kerk (New Church) and the Madame Tussauds Amsterdam Wax Museum. The National Monument, a white stone pillar designed by J.J.P. Oud and erected in 1956 to memorialize the victims of World War II, dominates the opposite side of the square. Also overlooking the plaza are the NH Grand Hotel Krasnapolsky and the upscale department store De Bijenkorf. These various attractions have turned the Dam into a tourist zone.

== History ==
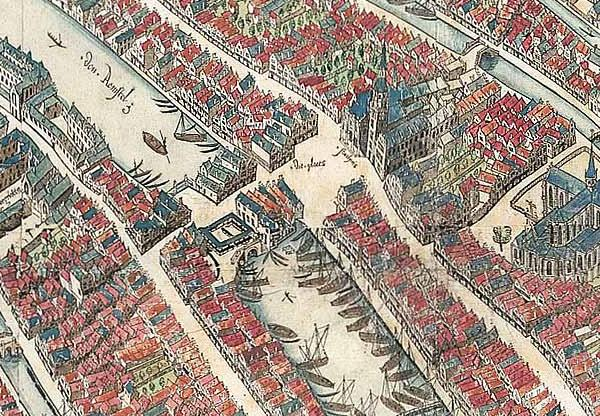
The Dam in 1544, as an actual dam in the river Amstel. View faces roughly southwest. On the right hand side are the old stadhuis (town hall) and the Nieuwe Kerk.

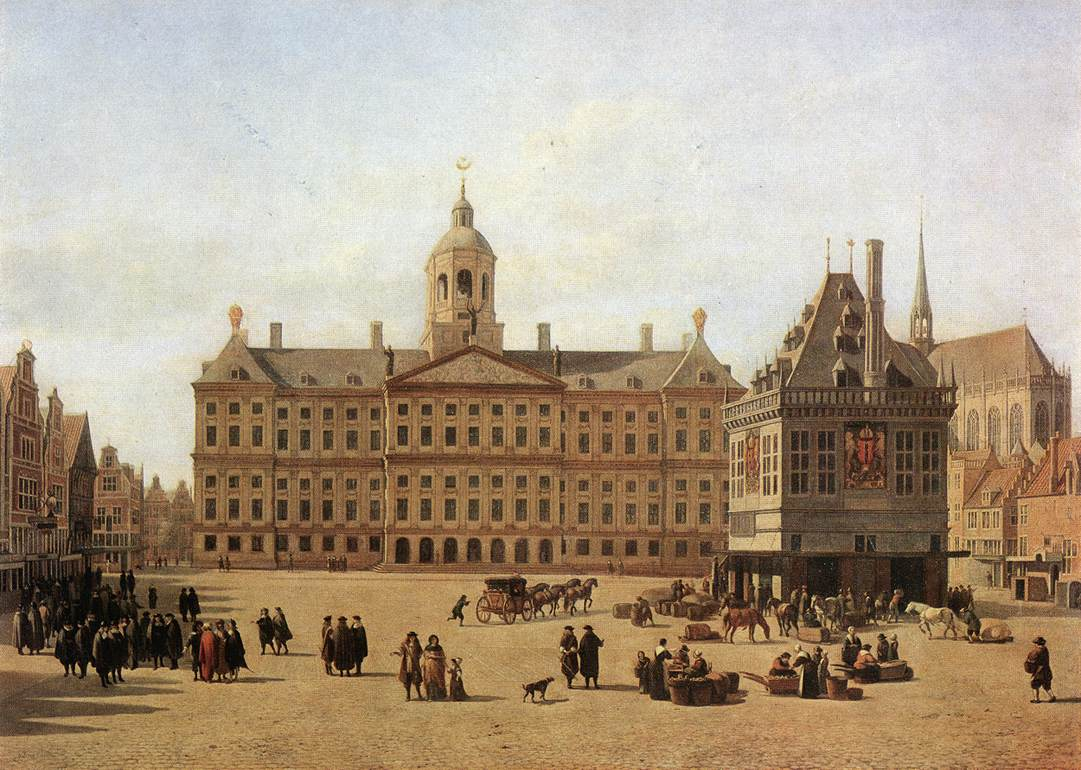
The Dam with the weigh house, late 1600s by Gerrit Berckheyde

The Dam derives its name from its original function: a dam on the Amstel River, hence also the name of the city of Amsterdam. Built in approximately 1270, the dam formed the first connection between the settlements on the sides of the river. The dam was originally built with a discharge sluice to allow control of the water level of the newly dammed river, but would soon be rebuilt with locks which also permitted navigation between the dammed river and the new harbor, the Damrak. The settlement first appeared in a document from 1275, concerning a road toll granted by the count of Holland Floris V to the residents apud Amestelledamme 'at the dam in the Amstel' or 'at the dam of Amstelland'.

As the dam was gradually built up it became wide enough for a town square, which remained the core of the town developing around it. Dam Square as it exists today grew out of what was originally two squares: the actual dam, called Middeldam, on which was located a large fish market (vismarkt) where ships moored at the dam to load and unload goods; and Plaetse, an adjacent plaza to the west. The area became a centre not only of commercial activity but also of the government, as the site of Amsterdam's stadhuis (town hall).

As a market square, the Dam had a weigh house that can be seen in some old paintings. It was demolished in 1808 by order of Louis Bonaparte who, upon taking up residence in the newly converted Royal Palace, complained that his view was obstructed.

The Damrak, or the former mouth of the Amstel River, was partially filled in the 19th century; since then, the Dam square has been surrounded by land on all sides. The new land made room for the Beurs van Zocher, a stock exchange that was built in 1837. After the stock trade moved to the Beurs van Berlage in 1903, the Zocher building was demolished. In its place, De Bijenkorf department store has stood since 1914.

In 1856, a war memorial named De Eendracht (The Unity) was unveiled inside the square before King William III. A stone column with a female statue on top, the monument acquired the nickname "Naatje of the Dam". It was taken down in 1914.

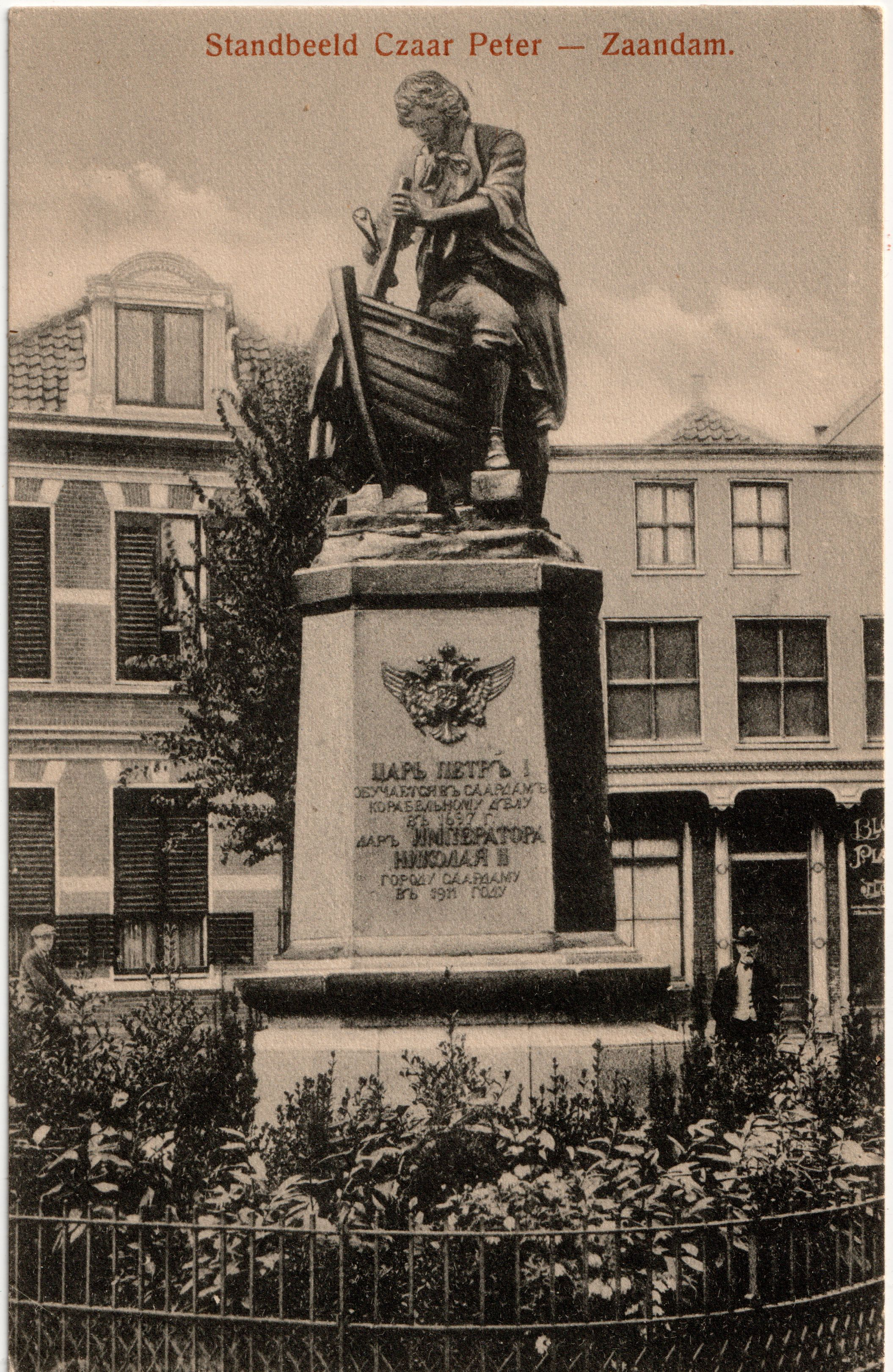
Peter I monument in Dam Square, Zaandam, early 20th century

=== Dam Square shooting, 1945 ===
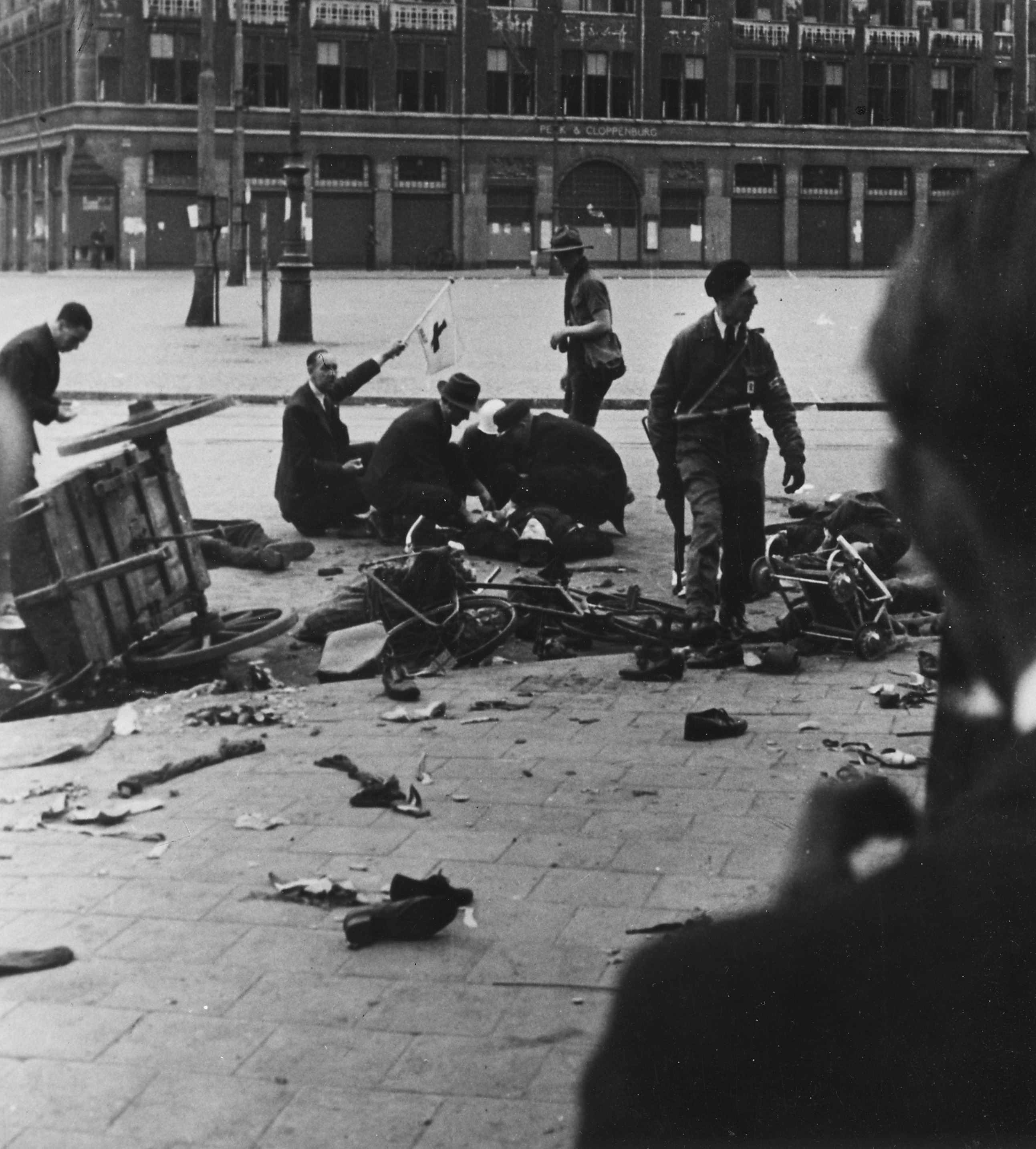
Dam Square just after the shooting, 1945

During World War II, the Netherlands were occupied by Nazi Germany. On 7 May 1945, two days after German capitulation, thousands of Dutch people were waiting for Canadian troops to arrive on the Dam square in Amsterdam. In the Grote Club, on the corner of Kalverstraat and Paleisstraat, members of the German Kriegsmarine watched as the crowd below their balcony grew and people danced and cheered. The Germans then placed a machine gun on the balcony and started shooting into the crowds. The motives behind the shooting have remained unclear; the Germans were drunk and possibly angered because contrary to previous agreement Dutch police had arrested members of the German military.

The shooting finally came to an end after a member of the Dutch resistance climbed into the tower of the royal palace and started shooting onto the balcony and into the club. At that moment, a German officer together with a Resistance commander found their way into the club and convinced the men to surrender. At the brink of peace, 120 people were badly injured and 22 pronounced dead. In 2013, evidence was brought to light that suggested the number may have been higher: possibly 33 people died, and there were 10 more unconfirmed possible victims.

=== Coronation riots, 1980 ===
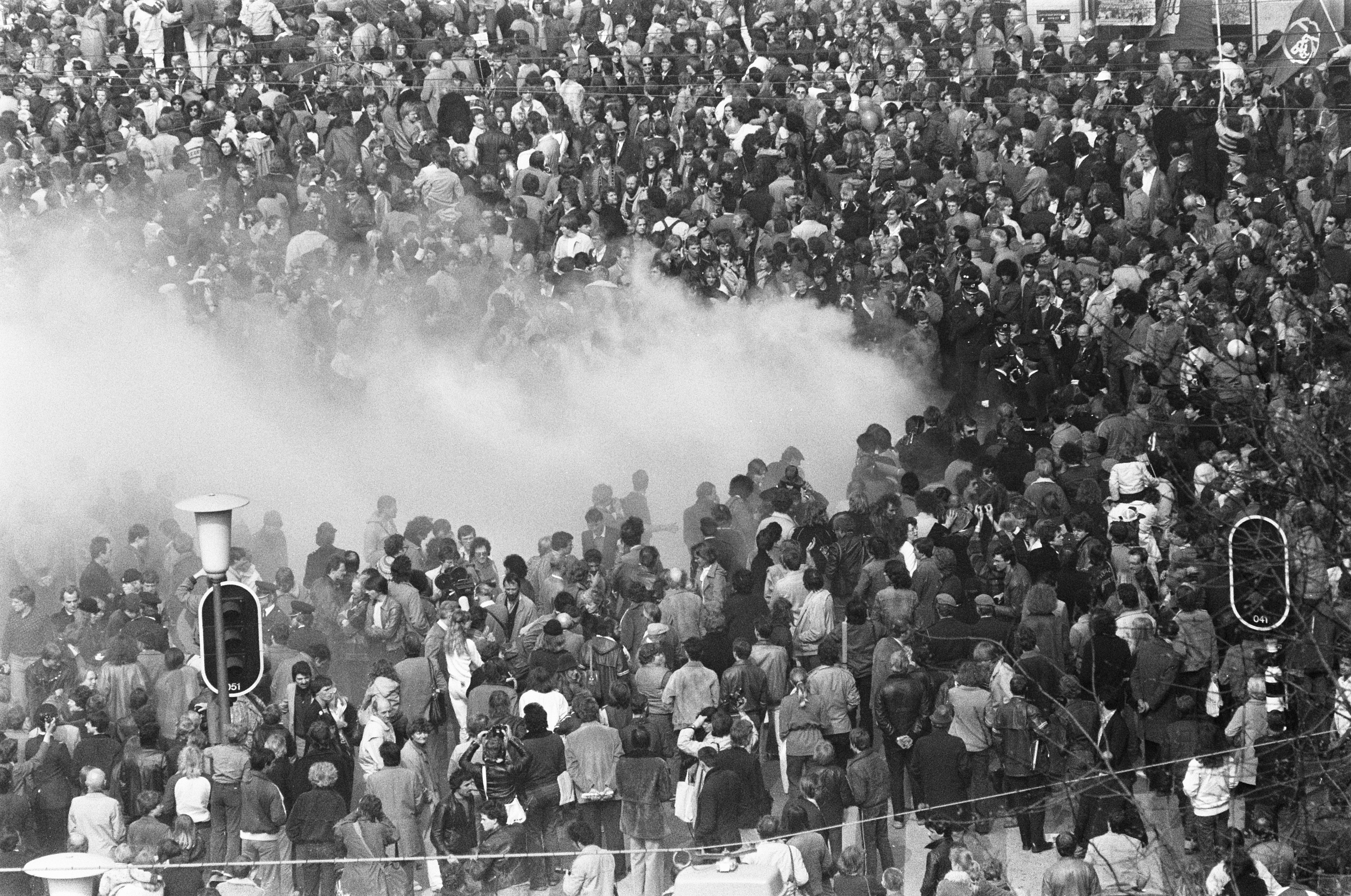
The Dam during the 1980 riots

Dam Square was the central scene of the largest post-war civil disturbance in the Netherlands during the Amsterdam coronation riots on 30 April 1980.

== Present ==
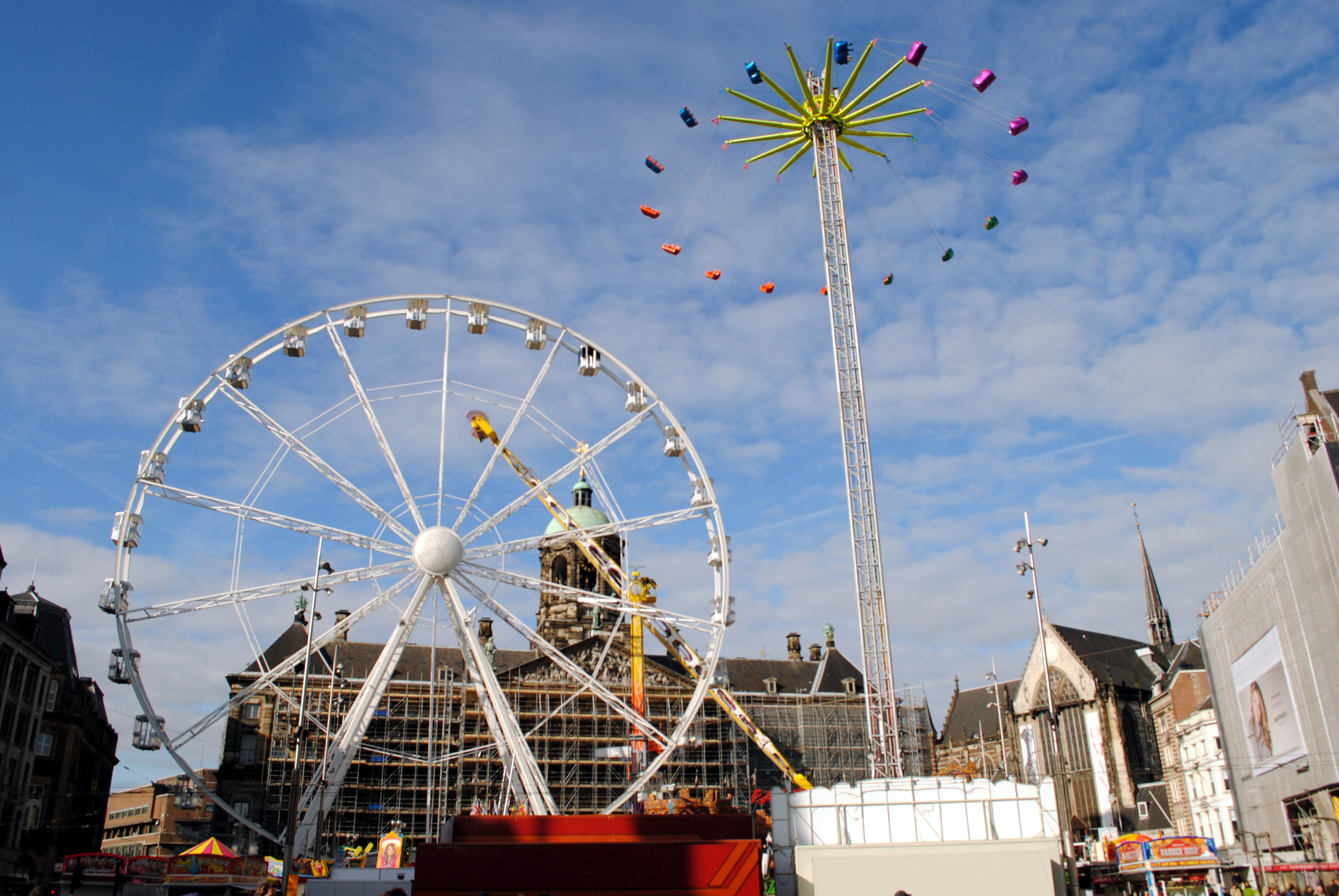
Several times a year there used to be a large funfair on Dam Square.

Several tram lines traverse the Dam and have stops there. In the time of the horse tram (end 19th century), the Dam was the most important tram hub of Amsterdam. After 1900, this function moved to the Central Station, at the other end of the Damrak.

Over the course of the 19th and 20th centuries, Amsterdam's main square became a "national" square well known to nearly everyone in the Netherlands. It has frequently been the location of demonstrations and events of all kinds, and a meeting place for many people. On 4 May every year, the Dutch celebrate National Memorial Day (Nationale Dodenherdenking), in observance of which the last addition to the square, the National Monument, was set up in 1956.

A funfair was held on Dam Square for several years.

On 6 December 2003, Bulgarian mobster Konstantin "Samokovetsa" Dimitrov was shot dead on Dam Square.

On 7 November 2024, a series of attacks occurred by fans of Maccabi Tel Aviv F.C. at Dam Square during their UEFA Europa League match against AFC Ajax.

On 27 March 2025, a 30-year old Ukrainian citizen from Donetsk used knives to attack a 67-year-old woman and a 69-year-old man with American nationality, a 26-year-old man with Polish nationality, a 73-year-old Belgian woman and a 19-year-old Dutch woman in the Sint Nicolaasstraat area in the vicinity of Dam Square.

On 3 April 2025, a 50-year-old man set himself on fire inside of his car, near the National Monument, causing a small explosion and injuring himself. No bystanders were injured.

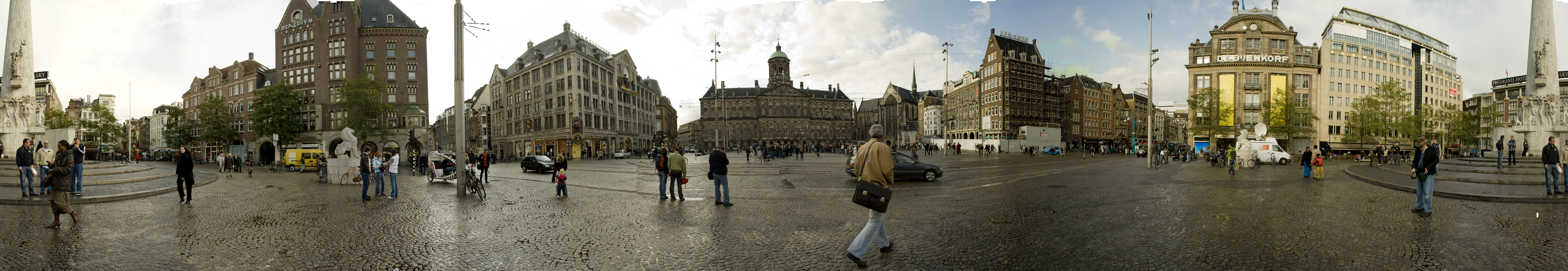
A 360-degree view of Dam Square in 2008

== See also ==
- van Dam
