= Korenbeurs (Amsterdam) =

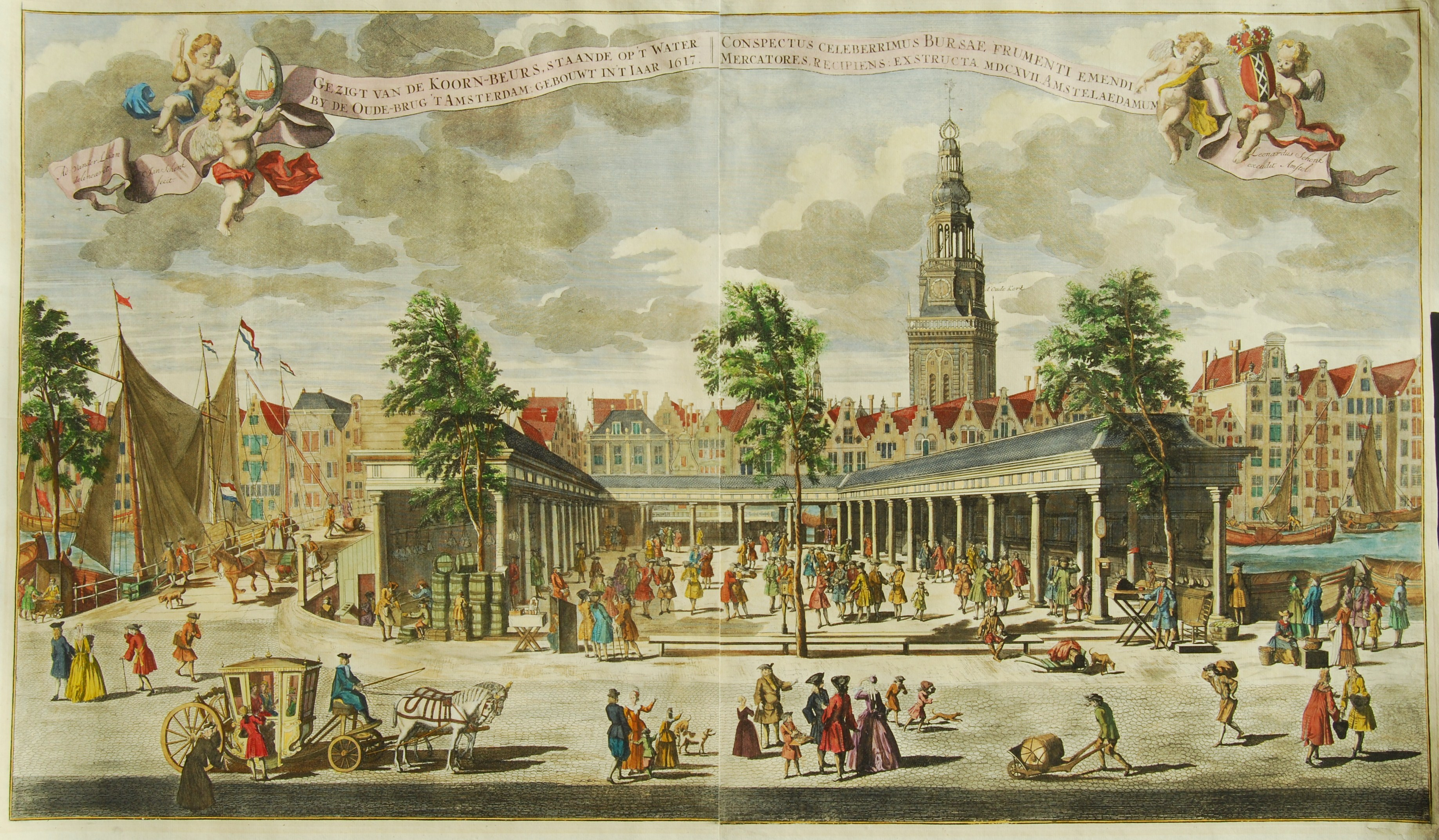
View of the Korenbeurs, standing on the Water by the Oude-Brug of Amsterdam, built in the year 1617. Engraving printed from two copper plates made between 1751 and 1766.

The Korenbeurs ("grain bourse") was a 17th-century commodity market in Amsterdam where grain was traded. The building stood on the banks of the Amstel, on the western side (Nieuwezijde) of the Damrak. It was directly south of the Oude Brug bridge, on a spot now occupied by the former stock and commodity exchange Beurs van Berlage.

== Trade ==
In the Korenbeurs, grain imported by ship from the Baltic region (primarily Poland, East Prussia and Livonia) was sold to traders from across Europe. This so-called moedernegotie ("mother of all trades") played a key part in the economic success of Amsterdam and the Dutch Republic during the Dutch Golden Age. Boxes placed against the walls of the Korenbeurs galleries contained samples of the grain on offer. Following a sale, the korenmeters ("grain measurers") and korenzetters ("grain placers") took care of dividing the shipment of grain into standard measurements set by the guilds.

The commodity market formed the centre of a number of buildings which were built in the first half of the 17th century to support the flourishing trade in grain and other goods which had made Amsterdam the focal point of European trade. On the eastern side (Oudezijde) of the Damrak, across from the Korenbeurs, the Accijnshuis was built in 1637/1638, replacing the earlier Stads-Excijns-Huis in the same location. In this building, which still exists today, customs duties were paid on the imported goods, such as grain, beer, peat, and coal. A small wooden house next to the Oude Brug bridge housed the korenmeters. This structure was replaced in 1620 by a new guildhall, the Korenmetershuisje, which still stands.

== Construction ==
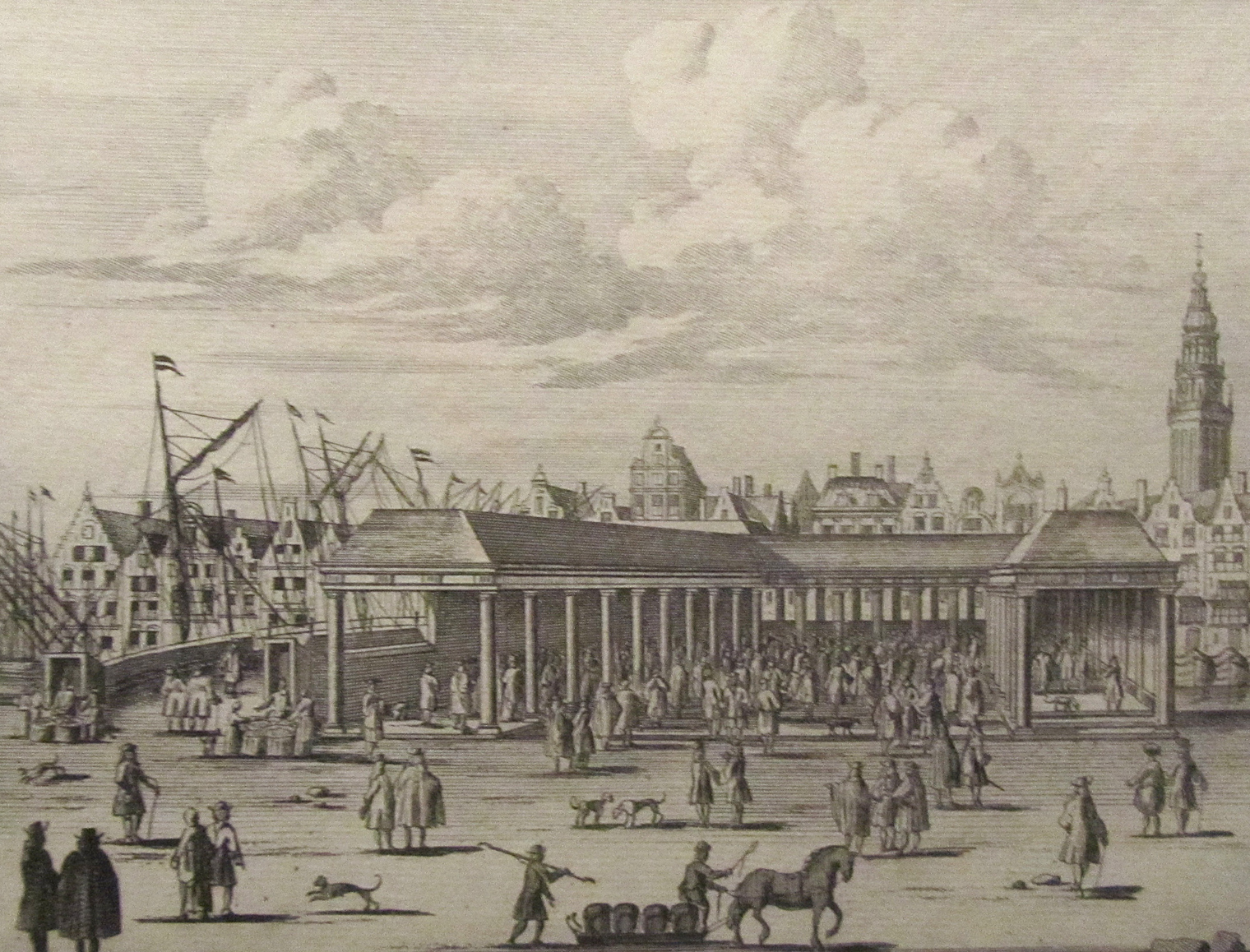
Drawing of the Korenbeurs dating to around 1732

The Korenbeurs was built in 1616/1617. The architect Hendrick de Keyser oversaw the construction of both the Korenbeurs and the earlier Koopmansbeurs exchange (completed in 1611) located nearby, on the Rokin. The Korenbeurs was a simple building consisting of a courtyard surrounded on three sides by a wooden gallery with pillars and a simple roof. The building had a single floor and no towers. The pillars were not connected by brick arches, as was common. Ships carrying grain could dock at the gallery along the water's edge. This part of the building partially overhung the river.

In 1768, the exchange was rebuilt in brick. The building remained standing until it was demolished in 1884, one year after the section of the Damrak between Papenbrugsteeg and Oude Brug was filled in.
