= National Monument (Amsterdam) =

Cenotaph in Netherlands

- Nationaal Monument
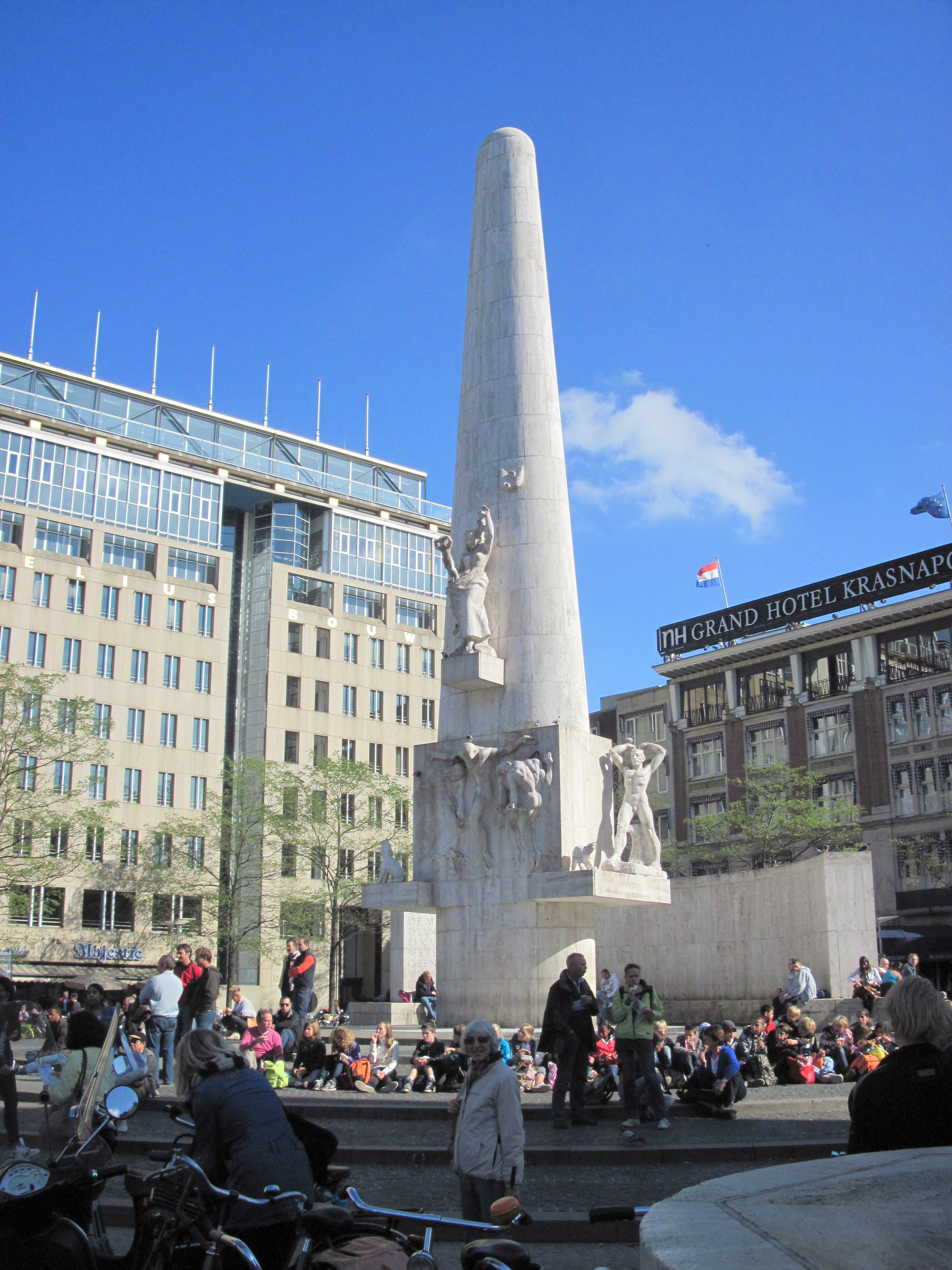
- The National Monument in 2010
- Interactive map of National Monument
- Location: Dam Square, Amsterdam, Netherlands
- Coordinates: 52°22′22″N 4°53′37″E
- Designer: Jacobus Oud
- Material: White travertine stone
- Height: 22 metres (72 ft)
- Beginning date: 1952
- Opening date: 4 May 1956
- Dedicated to: World War II memorial

The National Monument on Dam Square (Dutch: Nationaal Monument op de Dam) is a 1956 cenotaph in Amsterdam, Netherlands. A national Remembrance of the Dead ceremony is held at the monument every year on 4 May to commemorate the casualties of World War II and subsequent armed conflicts.

== History ==
Dam Square is the historic centre of the Dutch national capital of Amsterdam. Until 1914 another national monument stood on the Dam, De Eendracht or popularly Naatje van de Dam, commemorating the Ten Days' Campaign.

Shortly after the end of World War II in 1945, a liberty pole was erected on Dam Square. The Dutch government proposed that a permanent national World War II monument be placed there. While planning was ongoing, a temporary monument was erected on the Dam in 1947, designed by A. J. van de Steur and Auke Komter. It consisted of 11 urns with soil from World War II execution grounds and war cemeteries in each of the Dutch provinces. Three years later, a twelfth urn was added with soil from the Dutch East Indies, now Indonesia.

Footage from 1954 showing the construction of the monument

Footage from 1956 showing the construction of the monument

Meanwhile, a private initiative to erect a World War II monument had started. John Rädecker was commissioned to design the monument, and his designs were exhibited in 1946 at the Stedelijk Museum. Mayor Arnold Jan d'Ailly decided to consolidate the plans and build the privately funded monument on Dam Square, using Rädecker's designs. The architect Jacobus Oud was contracted to work together with Rädecker on the monument. The final design was approved by the Dutch government in 1952. Rädecker suffered from increasingly worsening health (he died four months before the monument was revealed), and his sons Han and Jan Willem Rädecker stepped in to complete the project.

The National Monument was finally revealed on 4 May 1956 by Queen Juliana of the Netherlands.

In the late 1960s and early 1970s, the National Monument, which dominates the eastern half of Dam Square, became a gathering place for hippies, who saw the monument as a symbol of liberty. Every night, a sizeable crowd of people slept around the monument in sleeping bags. On 24 August 1970, the municipal government banned Damslapen ("Dam sleeping"). This incited rioting on Dam Square which continued until the next day, when the square was cleared by off-duty marines. The hippies then relocated to the Vondelpark.

The monument has undergone two restorations, in 1965 and in 1997–1998. During the restoration in the 1990s, the entire monument was disassembled, and the brick interior of the central pillar was replaced with concrete. In 2007 a wheelchair ramp was added to the monument. On 14 August 2009, the monument gained rijksmonument status.

On 3 April 2025, a 50-year-old man set himself on fire inside of his car in a failed car bombing near the National Monument, causing a small explosion and injuring himself. No bystanders were injured.

== Design ==
The monument was designed by Dutch architect Jacobus Oud; the monument's sculptures are by John Rädecker and his sons Han and Jan Willem Rädecker. The reliefs are by the sculptor Paul Grégoire.

The central element of the monument is a concrete conical pillar 22 metres (72 ft) in height, covered entirely by white travertine stone. On the front of the pillar is a relief entitled De Vrede ("Peace"), consisting of four chained male figures, representing the suffering endured during the war. To either side of these central figures are two male sculptures representing members of the Dutch resistance, the left figure symbolizing the resistance by the intelligentsia and the right figure symbolizing the resistance by the working classes. Weeping dogs are at their feet, representing suffering and loyalty. Above the central relief is a sculpture of a woman with a child in her arms and doves flying around her, representing victory, peace, and new life. A relief of the back side of the pillar shows doves ascending into the sky, symbolizing the liberation.

The monument is placed on a series of concentric rings, forming steps up to the monument. In front of the monument, on either side, are two sculptures of lions on circular pedestals, symbolizing the Netherlands. A semicircular wall surrounds the back side of the monument. The wall contains eleven urns with soil from World War II execution grounds and war cemeteries in each of the Dutch provinces. and a twelfth urn with soil from the Dutch East Indies, present-day Indonesia.

=== Inscription ===
The pillar carries an inscription in Latin:

Hic ubi cor patriae monumentum cordibus intus
quod gestant cives spectet ad astra dei.

(freely translated: "Here, where the heart of the fatherland is, may this monument, which citizens carry in their heart, gaze at God's stars")

The wall behind the pillar also carries a Dutch-language inscription, a text by the poet Adriaan Roland Holst. On the back side of the wall is an inscription of a verse of Dutch poetry by Anthonie Donker, a pseudonym of Nico Donkersloot.

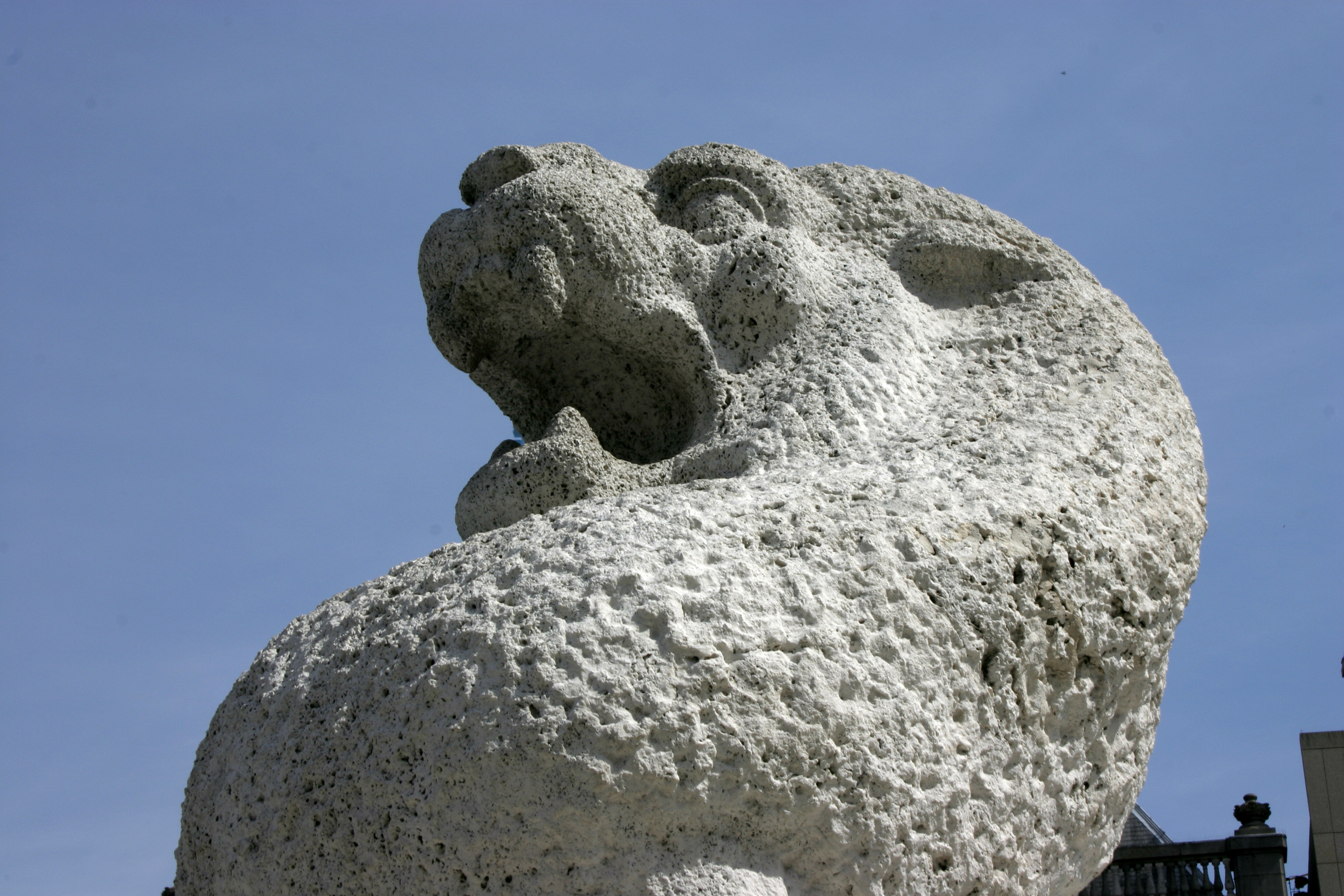
One of the two lion sculptures at the National Monument

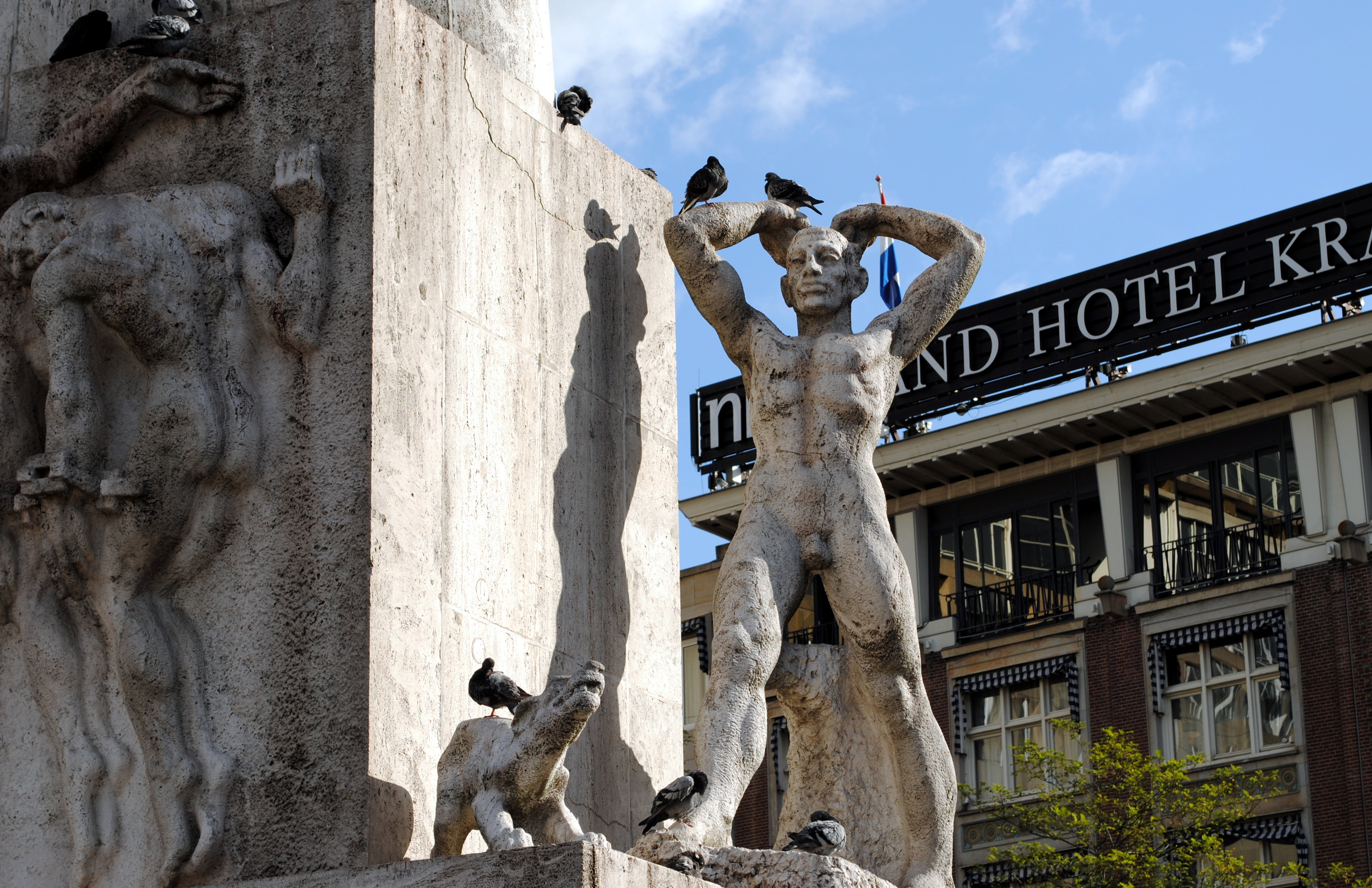
The right-hand figure, symbolizing the resistance of the working classes

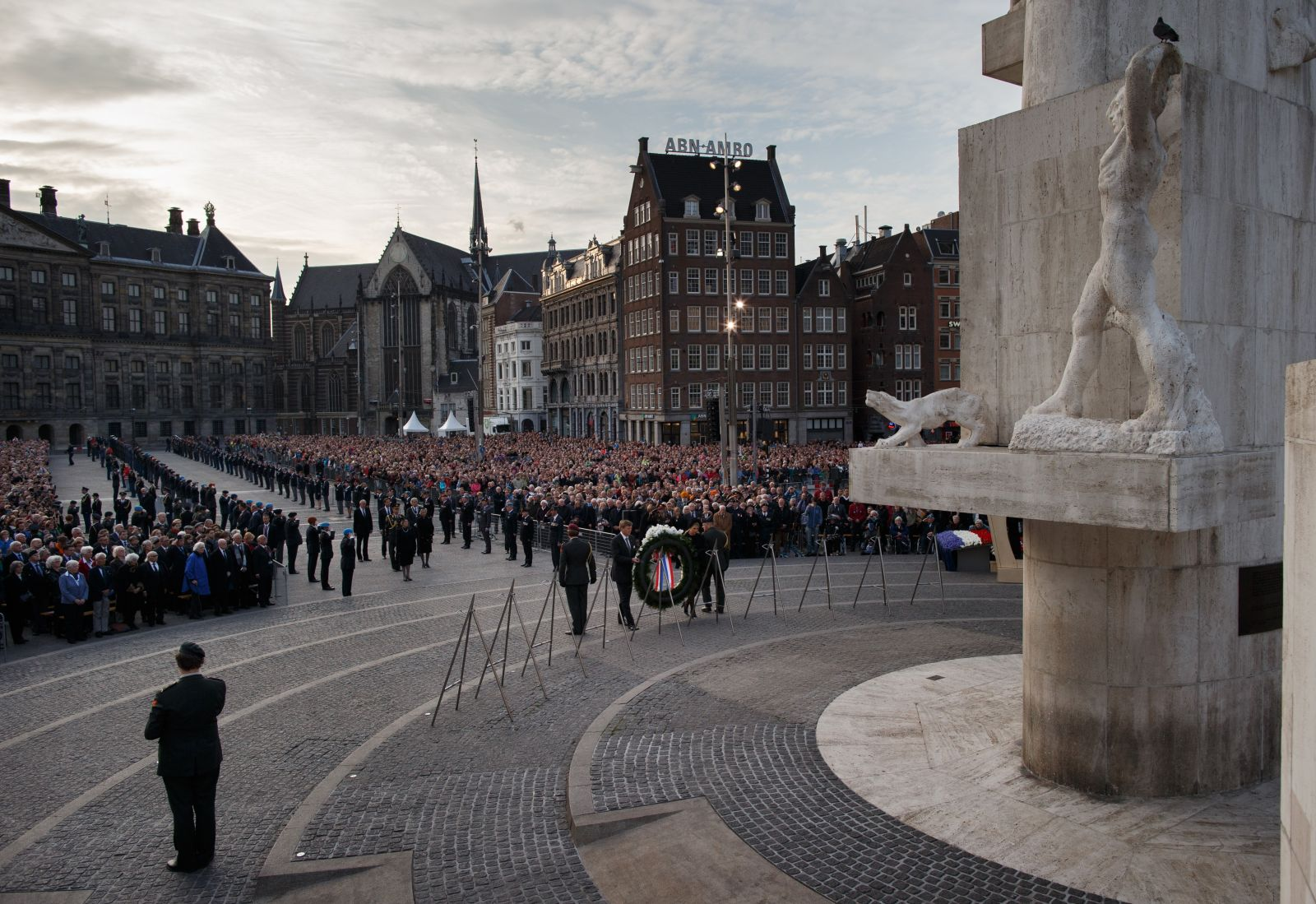
Remembrance of the Dead commemoration ceremony on 4 May 2014

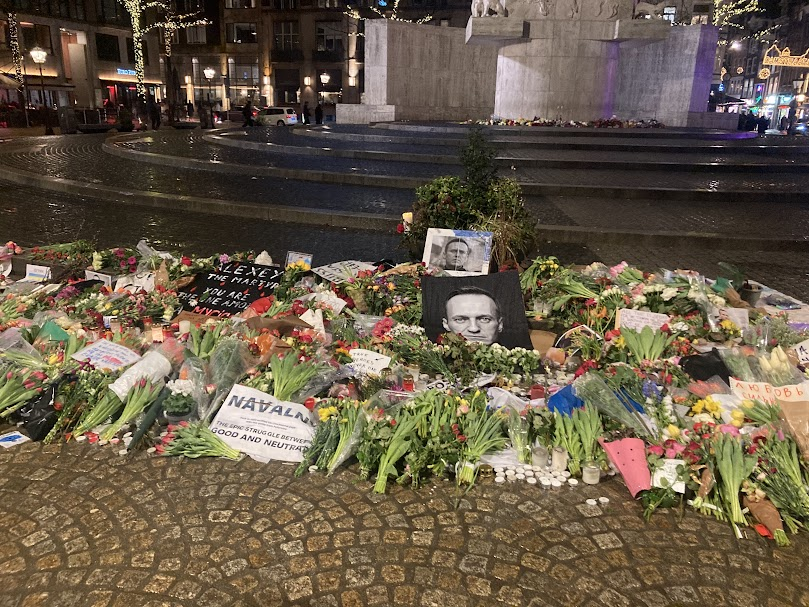
Flowers and messages left at the National Monument after the death of Alexei Navalny

== See also ==
- World War II memorials and cemeteries in the Netherlands
