= Damrak =

Avenue in Amsterdam between Centraal and Dam Square

Coordinates: 52°22′34″N 4°53′50″E

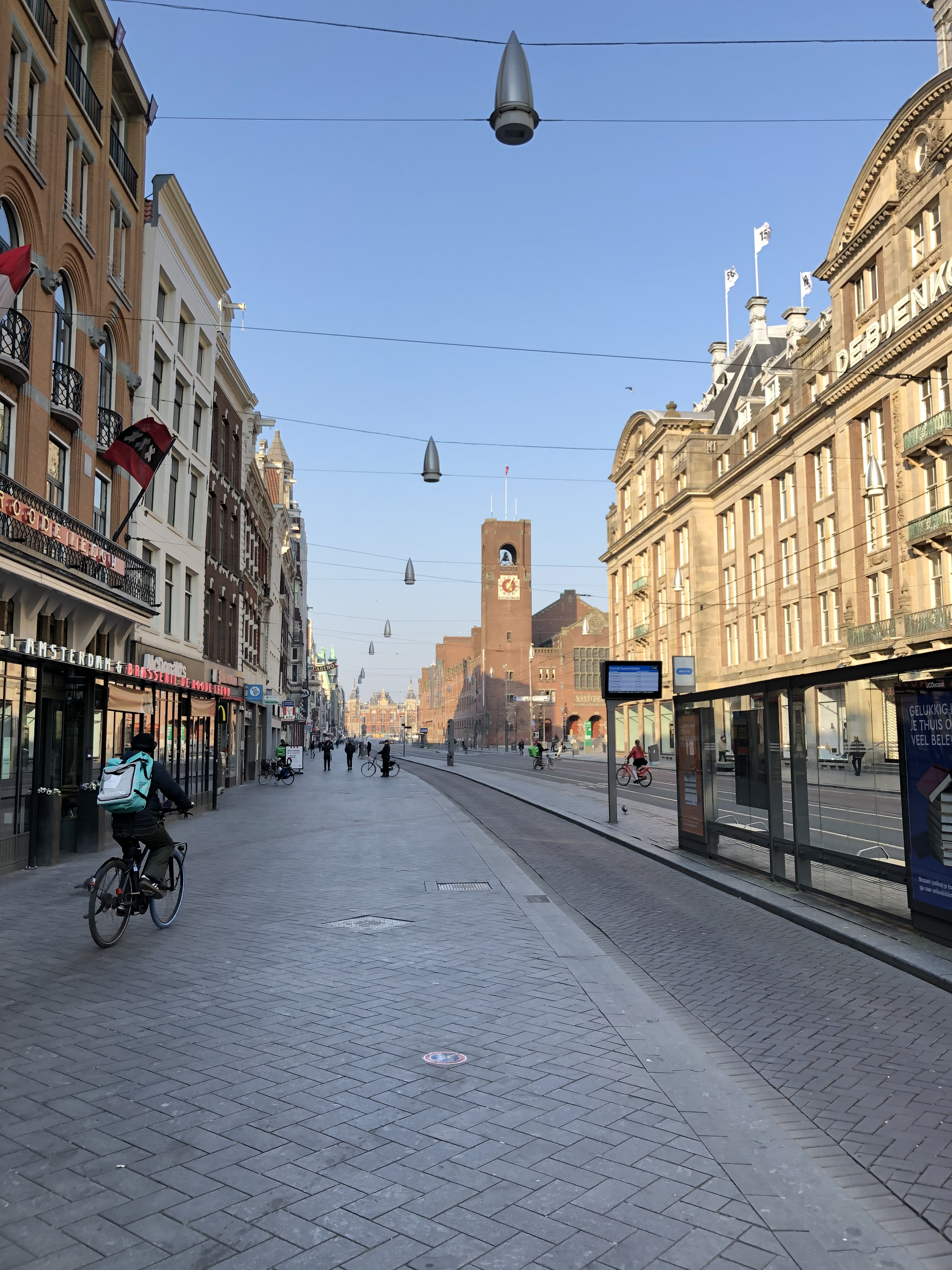
Damrak seen from the Dam. Right is the Bijenkorf and the tower of the Beurs van Berlage

The Damrak is an avenue and partially filled in canal at the centre of Amsterdam, Netherlands, running between Amsterdam Centraal in the north and Dam Square in the south. It is the main street where people arriving at the station enter the centre of the city. Also, it is one of the two GVB tram routes from the station into the centre, with lines 4, 9, 16, and 25 running down it. It is also on the route of the North/South Line (Amsterdam metro line) being constructed between the existing metro station at Centraal Station and the new Rokin station.

The street was located on a rak (reach), a straight part of the Amstel river near a dam; hence the name. In the 19th century, a section of it was filled in.

== Stock exchange ==
Because of the former stock exchange building, the monumental Beurs van Berlage, and several other buildings related to financial activities erected there in the early 20th century, the term "Damrak" has come to be a synonym for the Amsterdam Stock Exchange in the same way "Wall Street" is synonymous with the New York Stock Exchange and NASDAQ. The Beurs van Berlage now serves as a concert and exhibition hall. Today, the area is known for its restaurants, bars, and tourist shops. Its canals serve as a busy area for canal boats, as well.

== Gallery ==
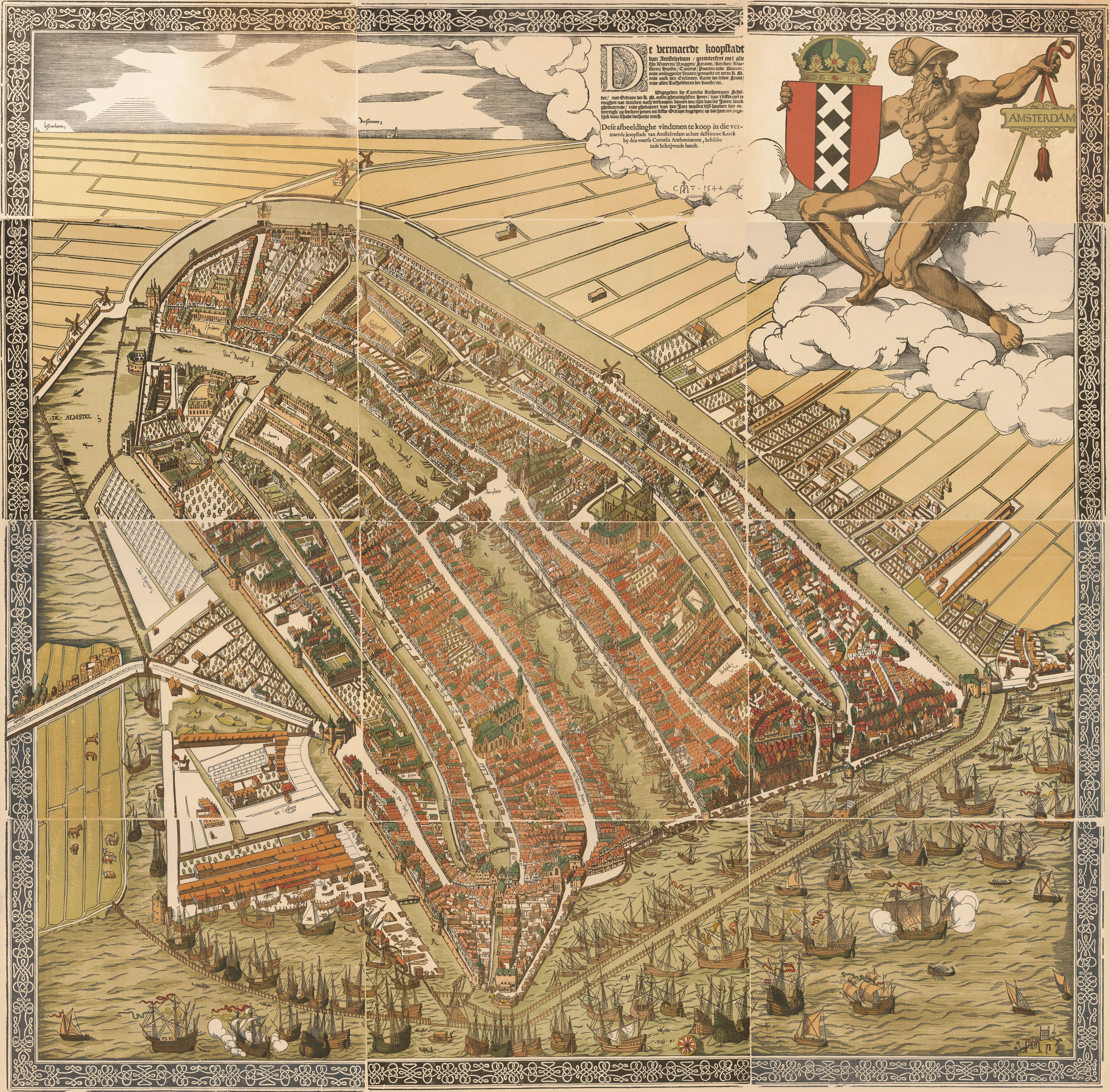
A birdseye view of Amsterdam circa 1544, looking south. The Damrak is the waterway at the center.

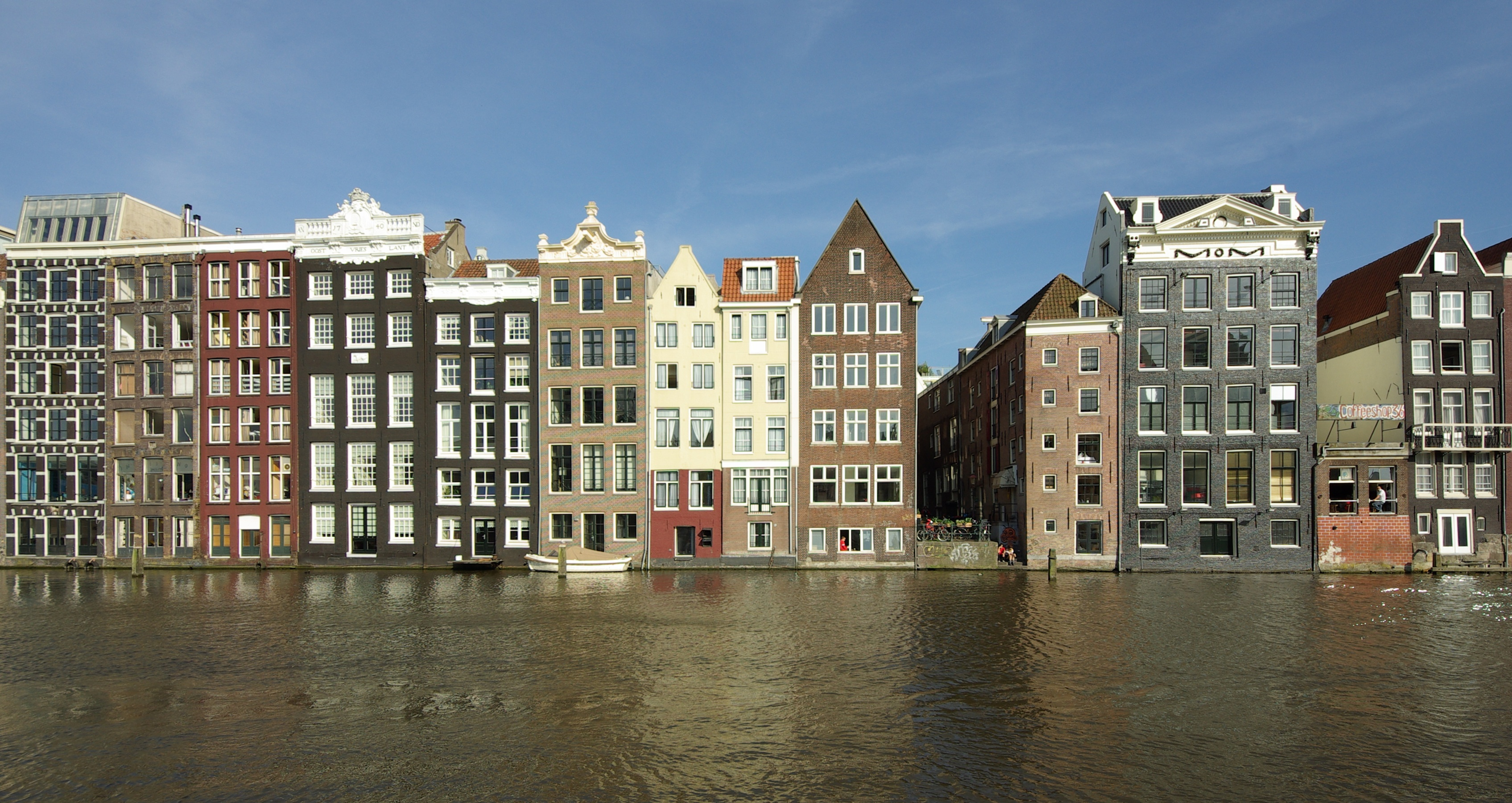
On the east side of the Damrak, the houses are located directly on the water, 2011

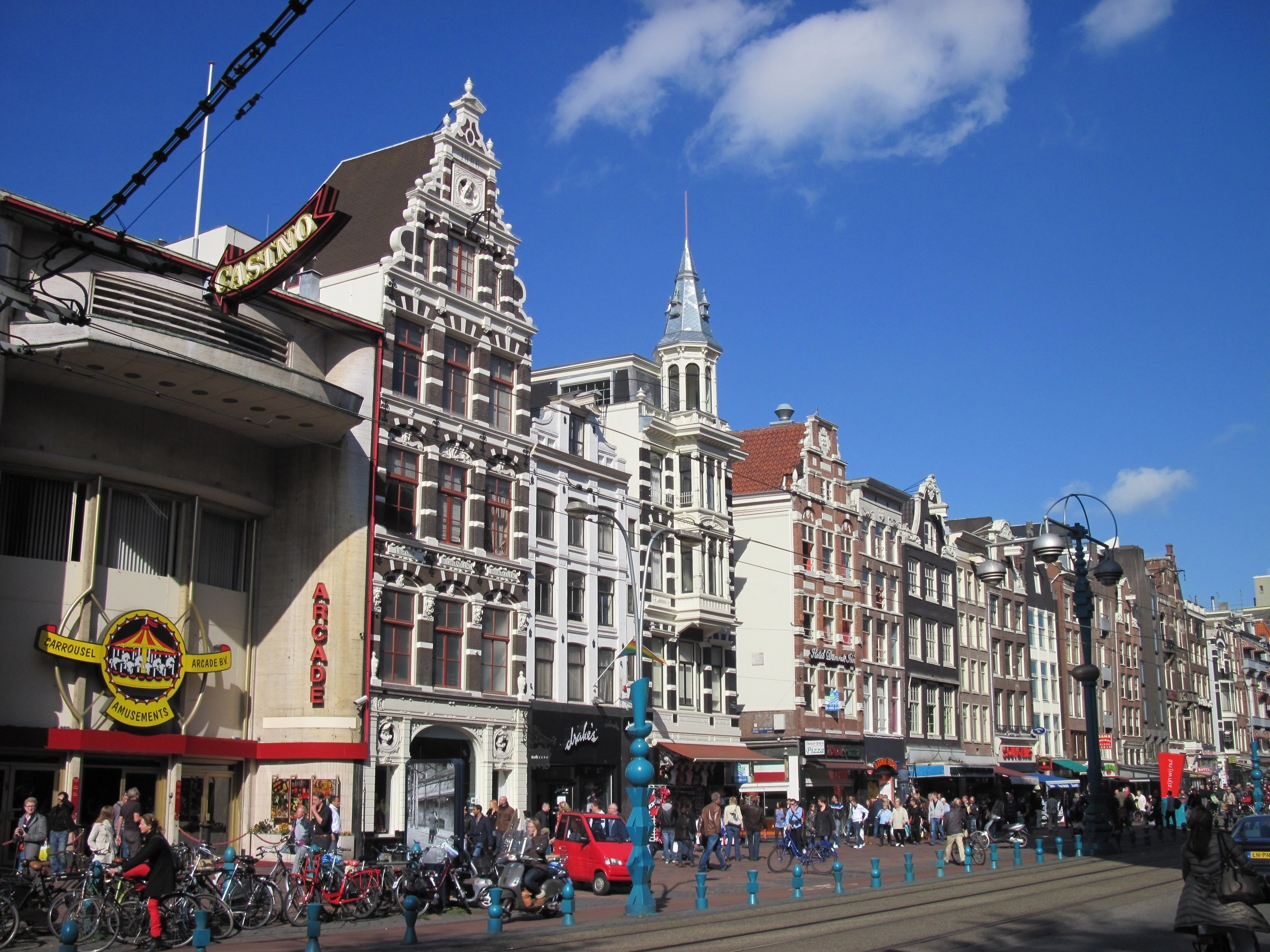
Typical architecture of the Damrak.

== See also ==
- List of streets in Amsterdam
