= M5 (Amsterdam Metro) =

Six-car electric multiple units

Alstom Metropolis M5
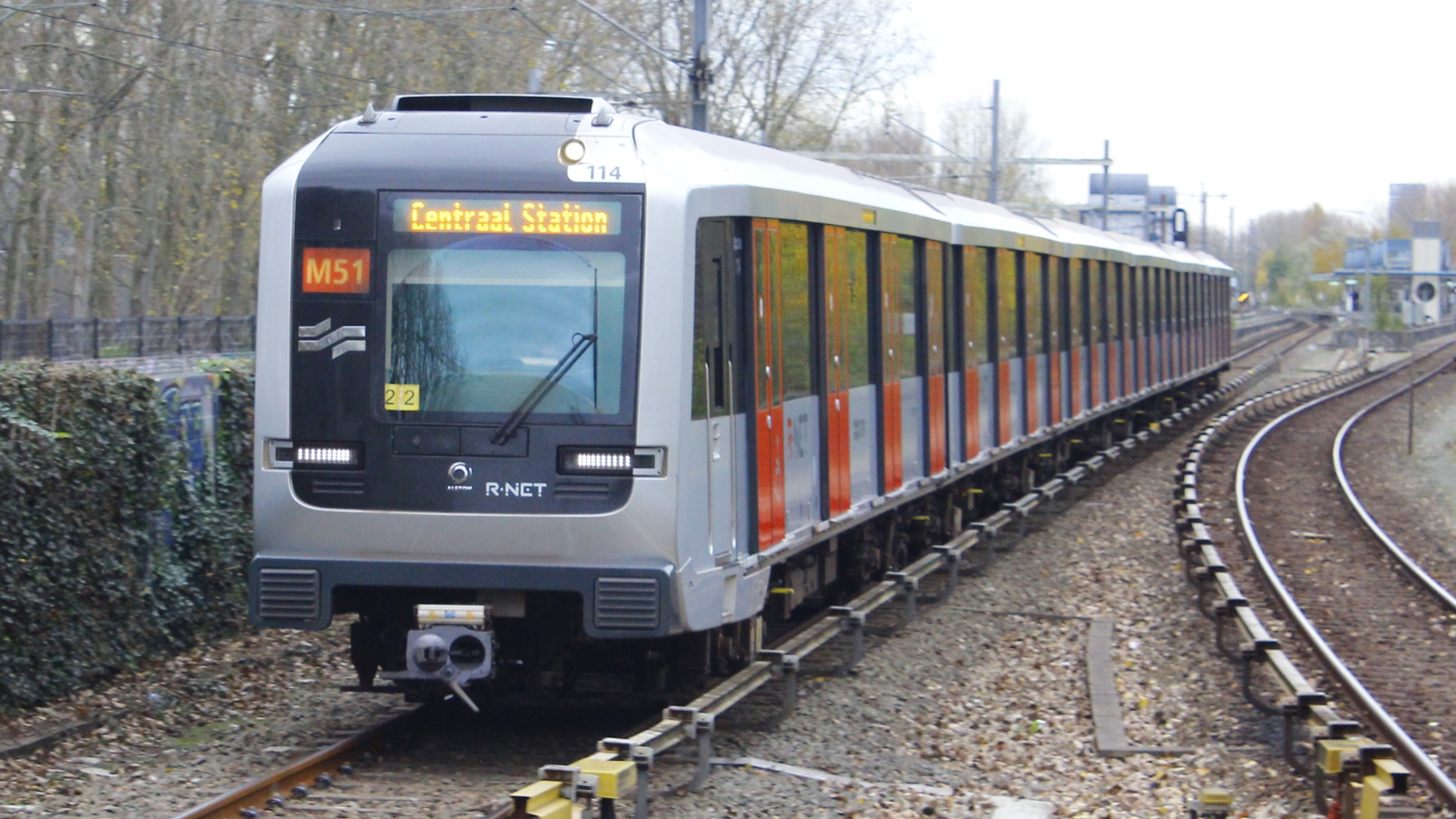
- A M5 trainset near Heemstedestraat Station, 2022
- Stock type: Electric multiple unit
- Manufacturer: Alstom
- Built at: Katowice, Poland
- Family name: Alstom Metropolis
- Replaced: M1/M2/M3 · S1/S2
- Constructed: 2011–2015
- Entered service: 24 June 2013
- Number in service: 28 trainsets
- Formation: 6 cars per trainset
- Design code: Tc–M1–M2 – M2–M1–Tc
- Fleet numbers: 107–162
- Capacity: 174 (seated); 786 (standing)
- Operator: Amsterdam Metro
- Lines served: 50 Line 50; 51 Line 51; 52 Line 52; 53 Line 53; 54 Line 54

Specifications
- Train length: 116.2 m (381 ft 3 in)
- Car length: End cars: 20.296 m (66 ft 7.1 in); Intermediate cars: 18.890 m (61 ft 11.7 in)
- Width: 3.005 m (9 ft 10.3 in)
- Height: 3.77 m (12 ft 4 in)
- Floor height: 1.1 m (3 ft 7 in)
- Doors: 24 doors per side
- Wheel diameter: New: 840 mm (33 in); Worn: 760 mm (30 in)
- Maximum speed: 90 km/h (56 mph)
- Weight: 190 t (420,000 lb)
- Traction system: Alstom ONIX IGBT–VVVF
- Traction motors: 16 × Alstom 4 ECA 2120
- Power output: 16 × 200 kW (270 hp); Total: 3,200 kW (4,300 hp)
- Acceleration: 1.2 m/s^{2} (4.3 km/(h⋅s))
- Electric systems: Third rail, 750 V DC
- Current collection: Contact shoe
- UIC classification: 2′2′+Bo′Bo′+Bo′Bo′+Bo′Bo′+Bo′Bo′+2′2′
- Track gauge: 1,435 mm (4 ft 8 1/2 in)

The Alstom Metropolis M5 is a fleet of 28 six-car electric multiple unit (EMU) trains for the Amsterdam Metro, delivered by the French manufacturer Alstom between 2012 and 2015. The trains are based on the Alstom Metropolis series, with variants in use by metro systems in various foreign cities such as Barcelona, Budapest, Santiago, and Shanghai. Although the trains are suitable for driverless operation, they are currently operated by drivers.

== History ==
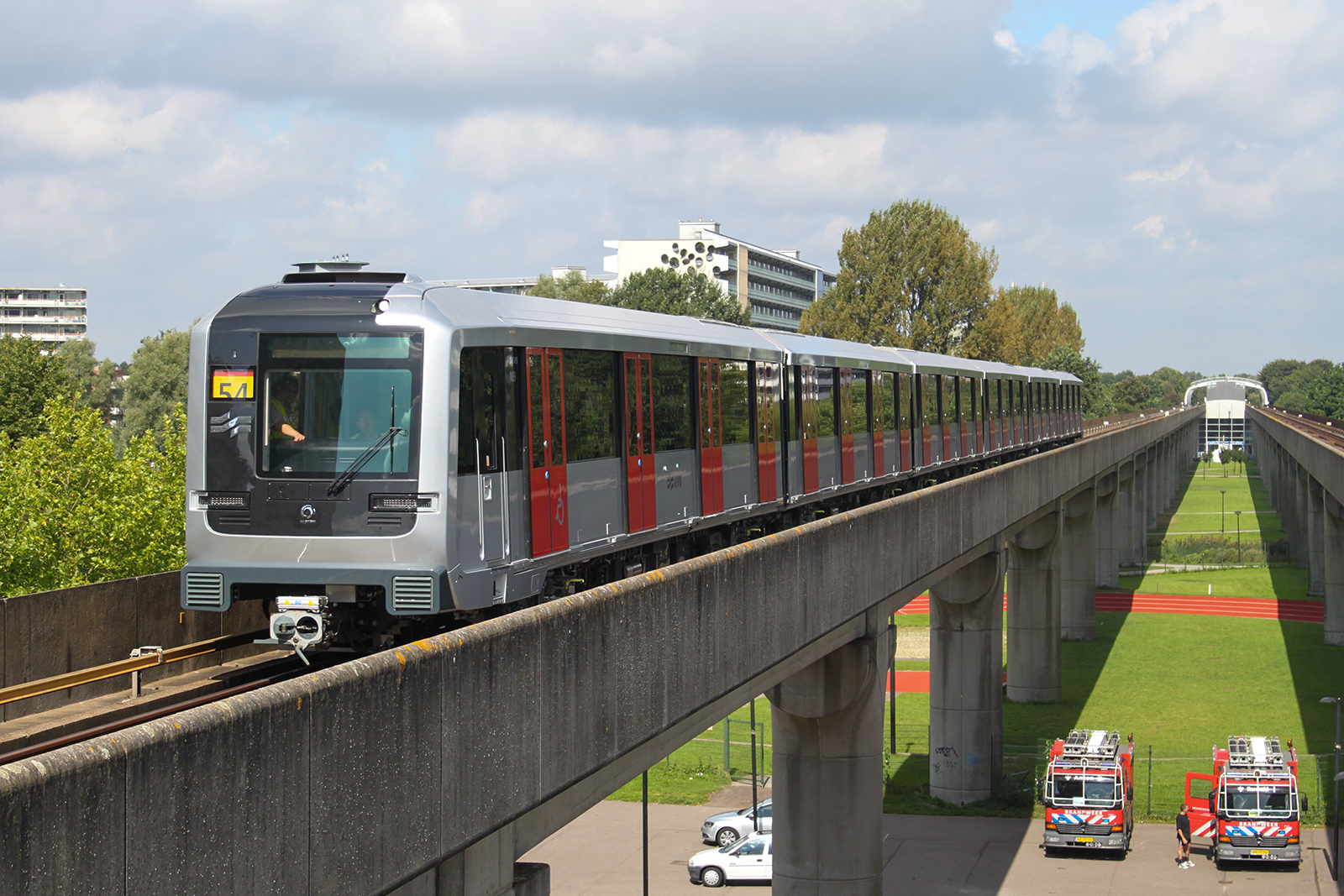
Trainsets 109–110 on a test ride in August 2012

The M5-series metro trains were initially ordered to expand the fleet and replace the aging M1/M2/M3 trains built by Linke-Hofmann-Busch between 1973 and 1980 for the East Line (Oostlijn). The initial order comprised 23 trainsets. For the north–south Line 52, which opened in 2018, five additional trainsets were procured under an option originally designated as the M6 series; all 28 trains are now designated as M5.

The first two trainsets were manufactured at Alstom's factory in Valenciennes, France, with the first unveiled on 24 November 2011. Its first half (three cars) arrived in the Amsterdam Metro's Diemen yard on 11 April 2012, followed shortly by the second half. The six cars were then assembled into a complete trainset for testing.

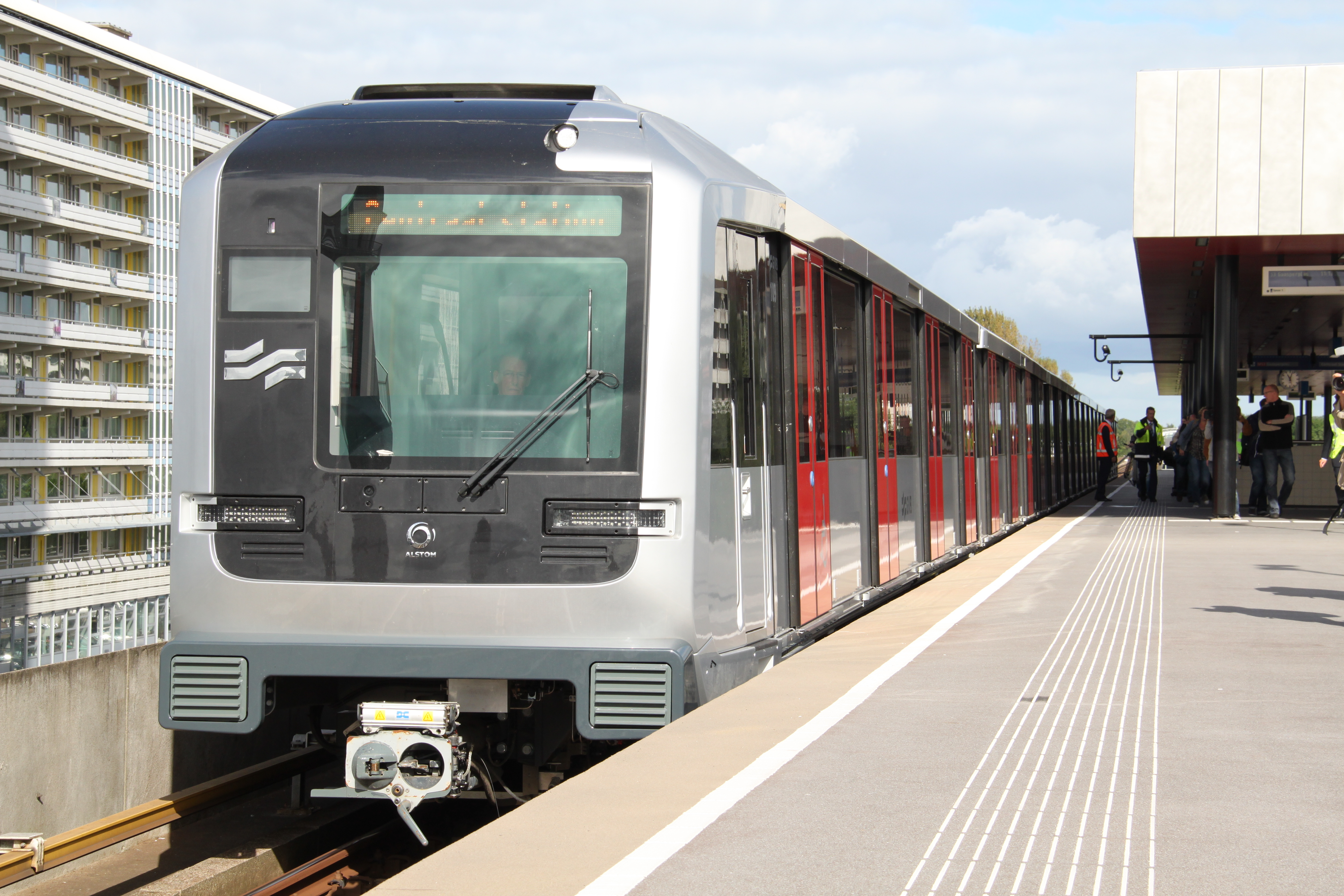
A M5 train during a trial run at Kraaiennest

The remainder of the fleet was produced at Alstom's facility in Katowice, Poland. Deliveries, planned for late 2012, were delayed until May 2013. The 23rd trainset arrived in the second quarter of 2015. The order cost approximately €200 million.

On 13 February 2013, Alstom confirmed an order for five extra trainsets, raising the total to 28. Twenty-five are deployed daily, with three reserved for maintenance.

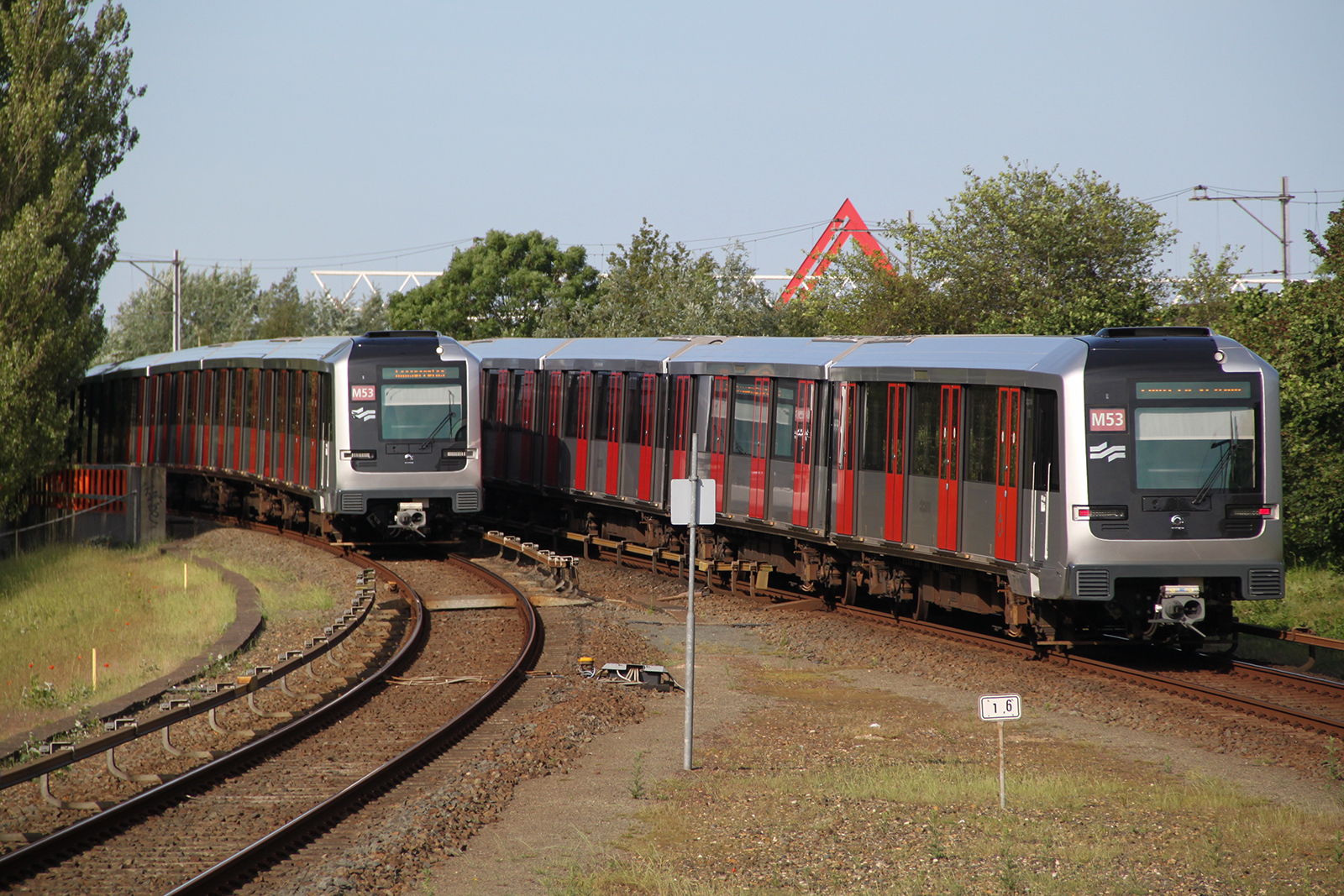
Two M5 trainsets in Venserpolder

Although the M5 was originally expected to enter service in December 2012, technical and software issues delayed service entry. The first trainset, numbered 109–110, was handed over to GVB on 2 May 2013 and scheduled to enter service on Line 50 later that month. However, problems with the Train-TV system during trial operations led to further postponements. On 20 June 2013, GVB announced that service would begin on 26 June, using a temporary solution that employed analog equipment from older trains while a permanent fix was under development. Additionally, at the East Line terminus at Amsterdam Centraal Station, it was discovered that the curved platform caused a significant gap between the platform and the front car’s wheelchair-accessible area. Initial attempts to bridge the gap using foam strips were unsuccessful. The issue was later resolved, and the M5 was able to enter service on Line 54 on 9 September 2013, followed by Line 53 in 2014.

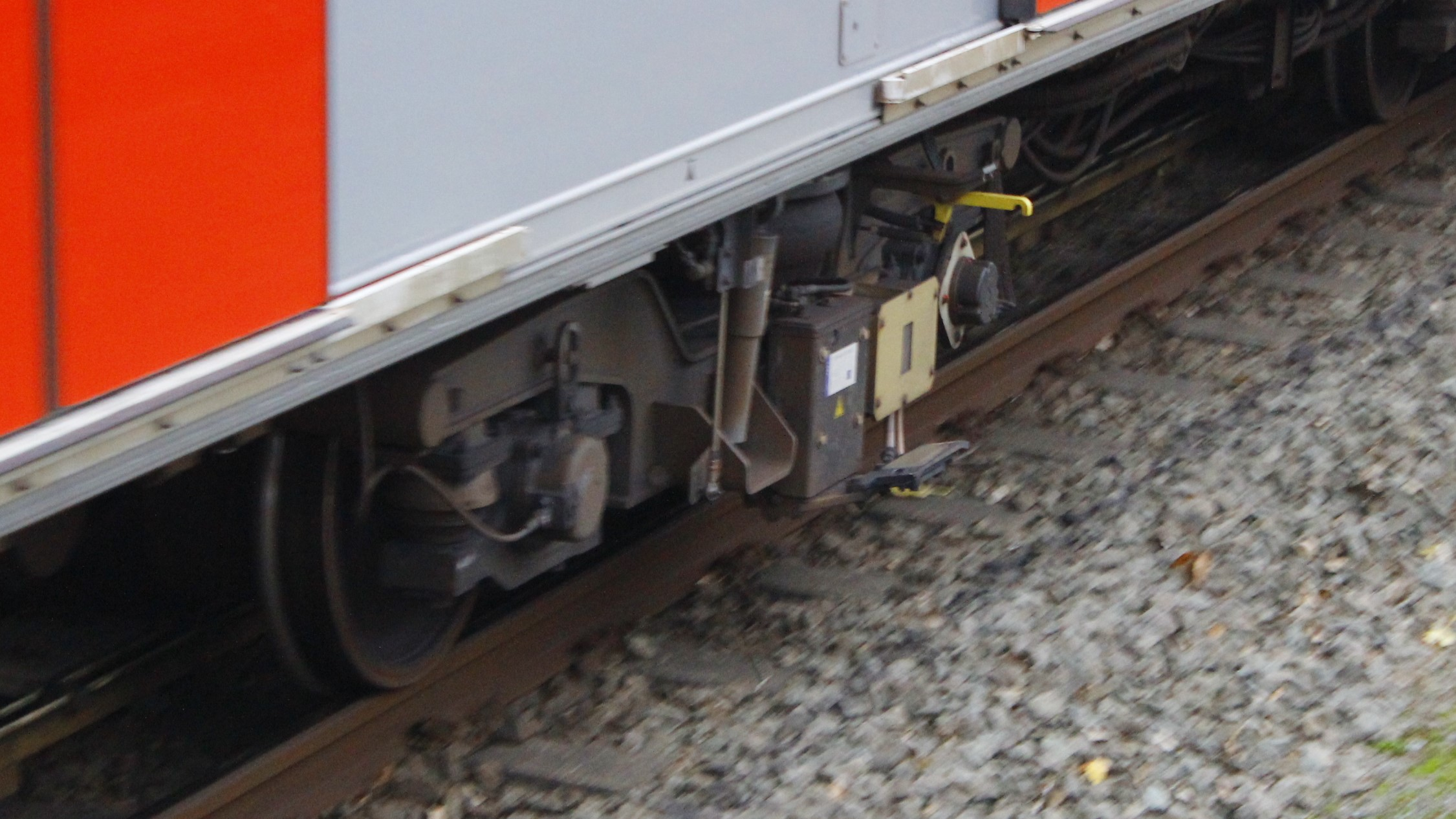
The contact shoe as used on the M5 train

The delivery of all 28 M5 trainsets was completed on 6 November 2015. With the opening of Line 52 in July 2018, M5 trains were introduced there as well. From 3 March 2019, the M5 series began serving Line 51, which had been rerouted from Zuid Station to Isolatorweg as a full metro service, replacing the former light rail operation to Amstelveen.

M5 trains have a total length of 116.2 metres (381 ft). After delivery of the trains began, it became clear to GVB that trains of this length provided too much capacity during off-peak hours and complicated maintenance as all six cars would have to be taken out of service simultaneously. Consequently, no further M5 units were ordered beyond the initial 28. Instead, the shorter three-car M7 series was introduced from 2021, featuring open gangways and a length of about 61 metres (200 ft). Two coupled M7 sets match an M5's capacity for peak times, while single units operate during quieter periods, improving flexibility and reducing overcapacity.

== Features ==
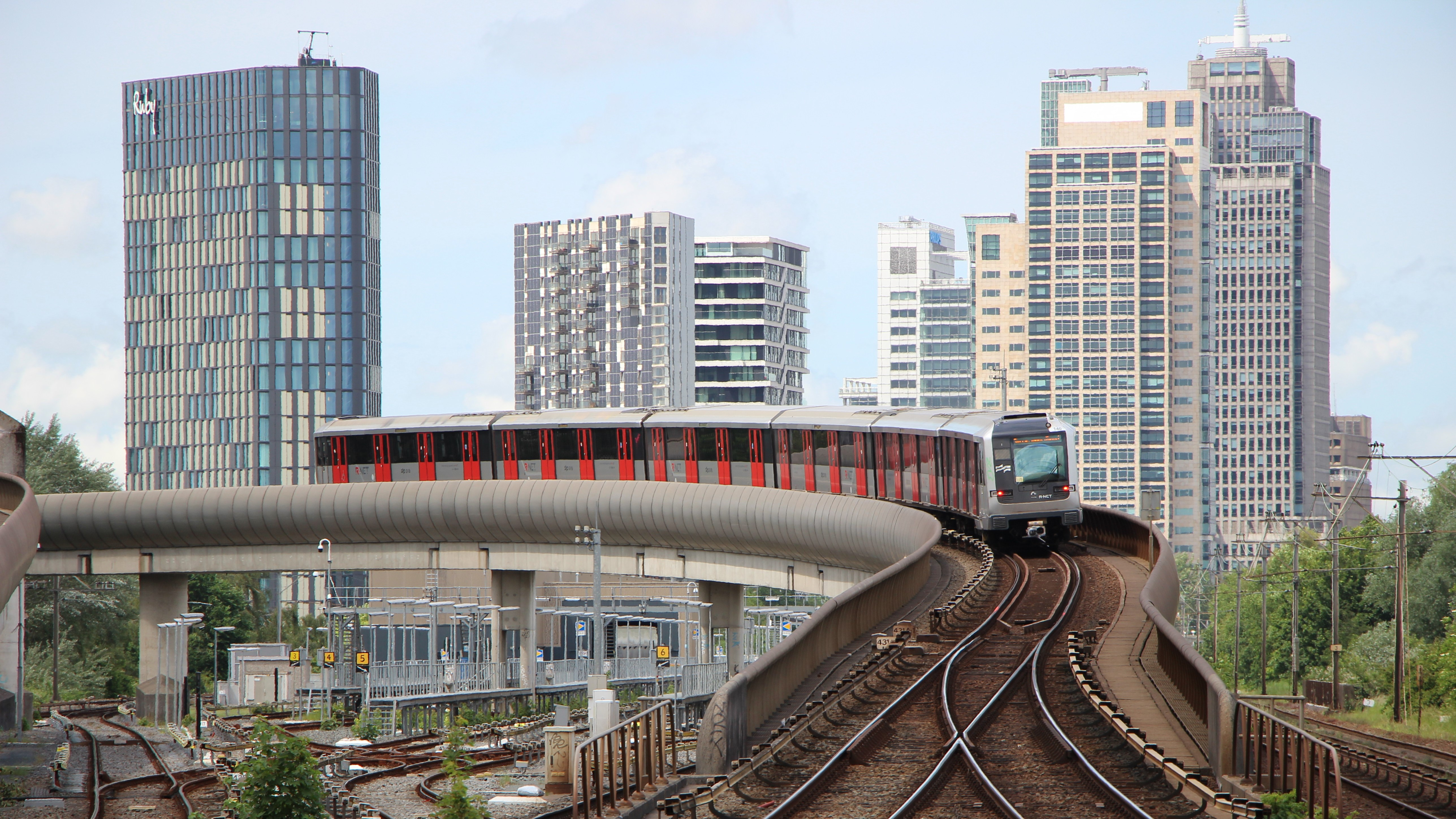
Trainset 139–140 on the viaduct between Van der Madeweg and Overamstel stations

Each six-car M5 trainset is 116.2 metres (381 ft 3 in) long and 3.005 metres (9 ft 10.3 in) wide, with 24 doors on each side and a maximum capacity of 960 passengers. Like the earlier M1/M2/M3 series trains, the M5 features hard bench seating. However, unlike its predecessors, most seats are arranged longitudinally (facing the aisle) to increase standing space. Transverse seating (facing the direction of travel) is limited to 18 seats—some of them foldable—located near the articulated sections and at wheelchair-accessible areas in the end cars.

The trainsets feature a fully walk-through design and are equipped with air conditioning. Interior lighting and headlights use LED technology. To accommodate the taller average height of passengers in the Netherlands, the doors were designed to be taller than those of standard Metropolis models.

The exterior design and colour scheme—silver-grey with red doors—draws inspiration from the original M1/M2/M3 series. In 2018, the fleet was updated with R-net branding.

The M5 is equipped with automatic train control and can operate semi-automatically at Grade of Automation 2 (GoA 2). At Noord station, it is capable of fully automatic turnarounds under GoA 4.

Trainsets are built as two three-car halves that are semi-permanently coupled, forming a fixed six-car unit with sequential car numbers (e.g., 107 and 108). However, in 2023, trainset halves 115 and 157 were paired together following severe damage to trainset halves 116 and 158. Trainset half 157 was subsequently renumbered to 116.

== Interior ==
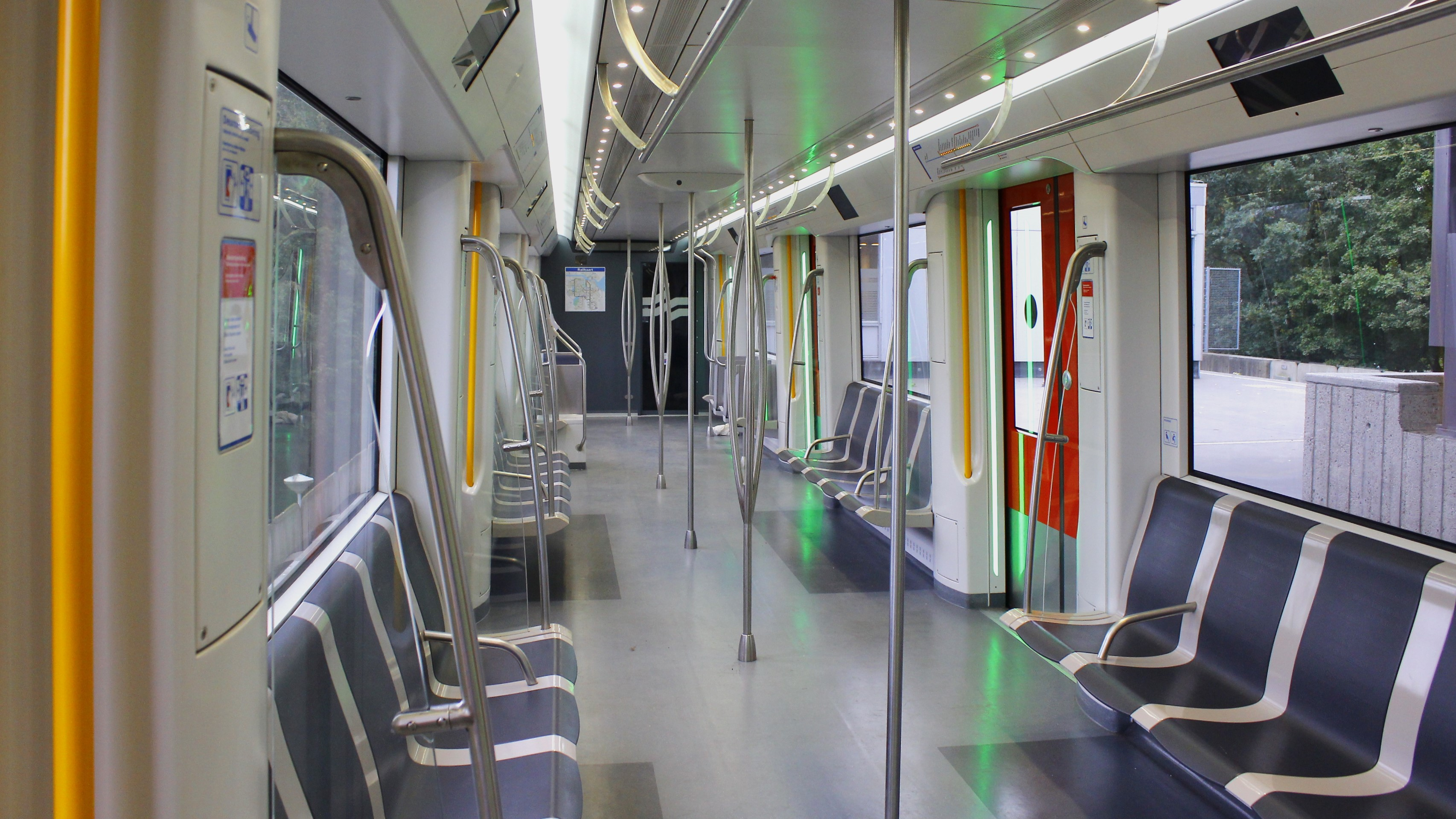
Interior view

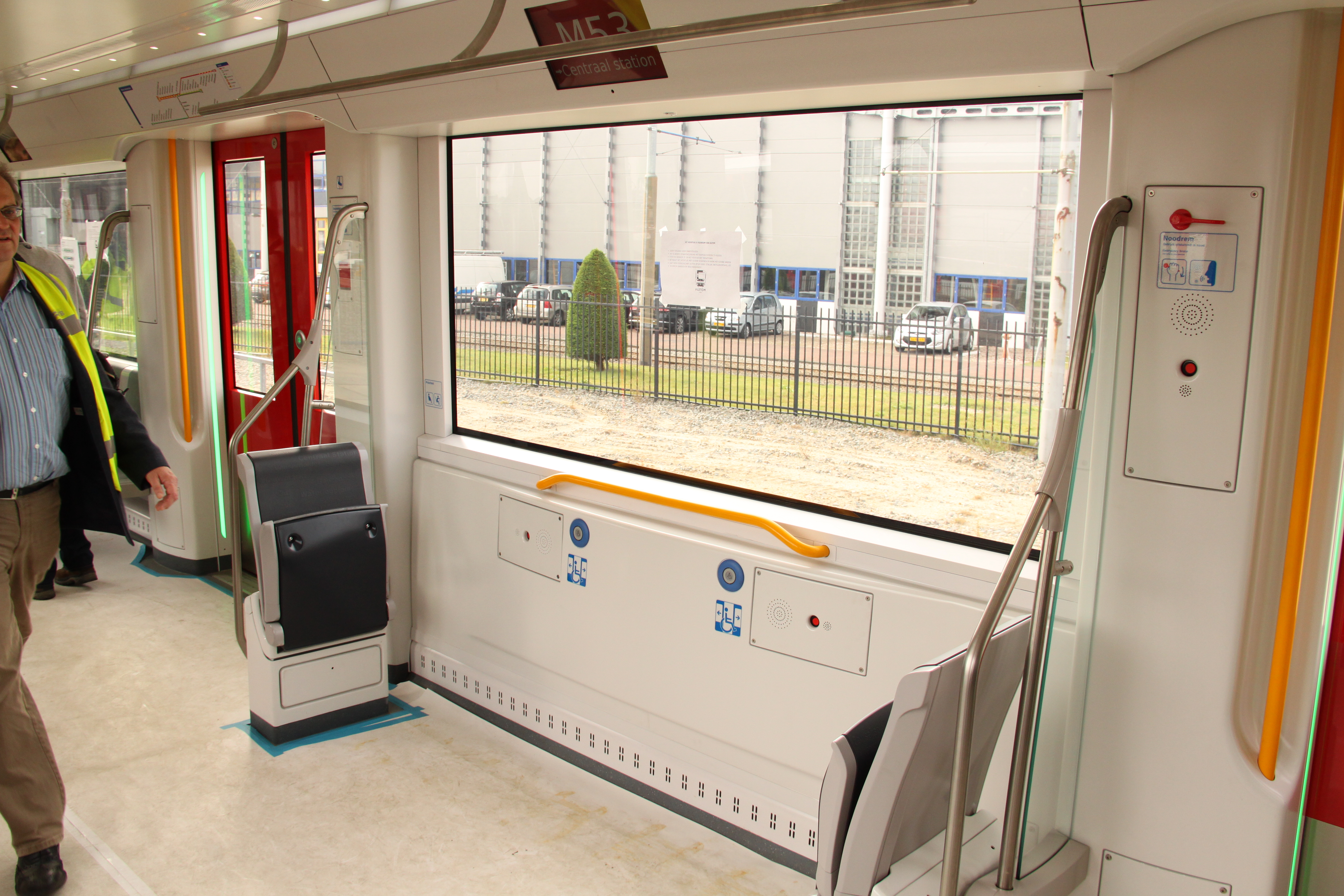
Wheelchair and stroller space

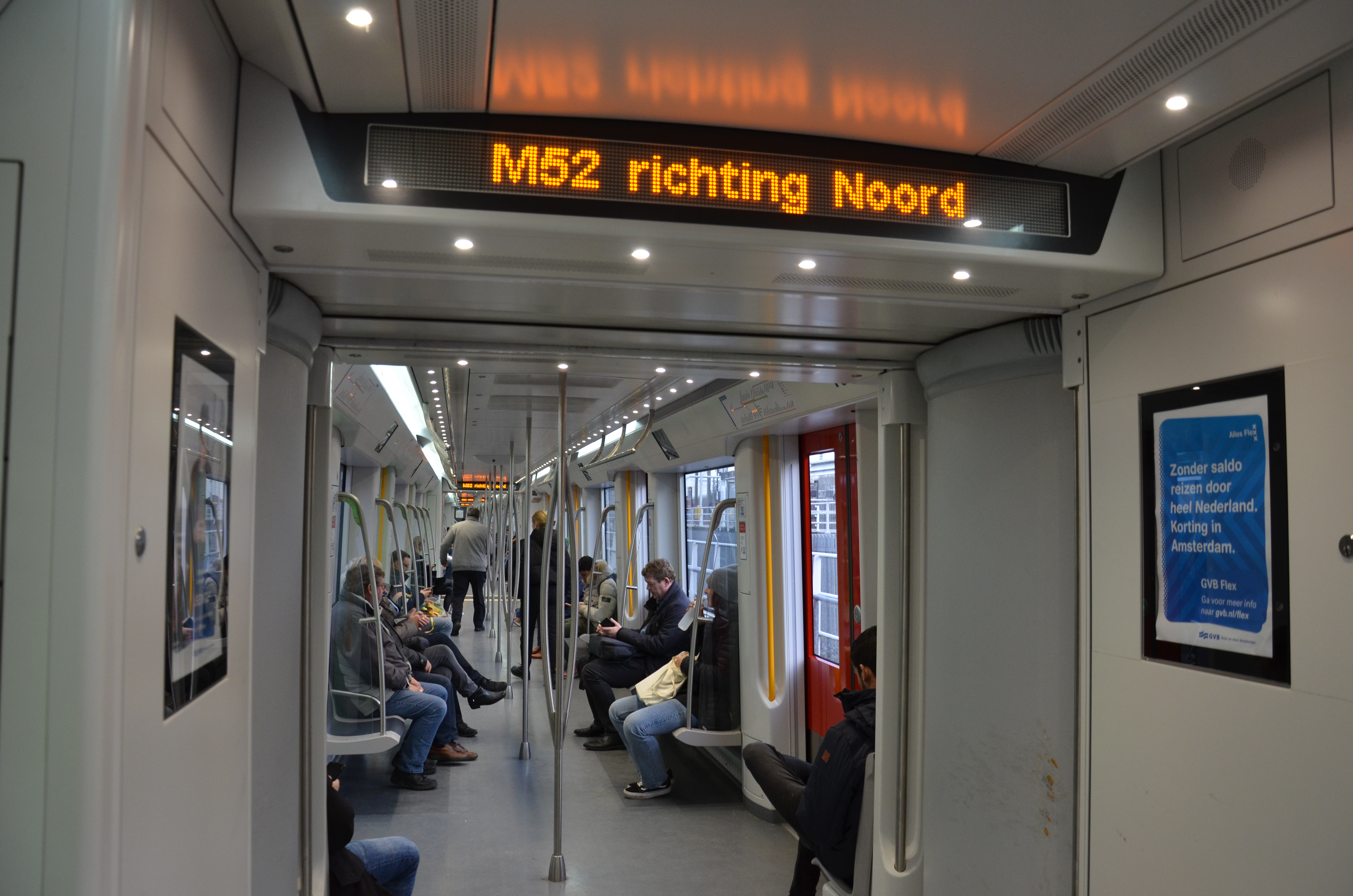
Open gangway connection

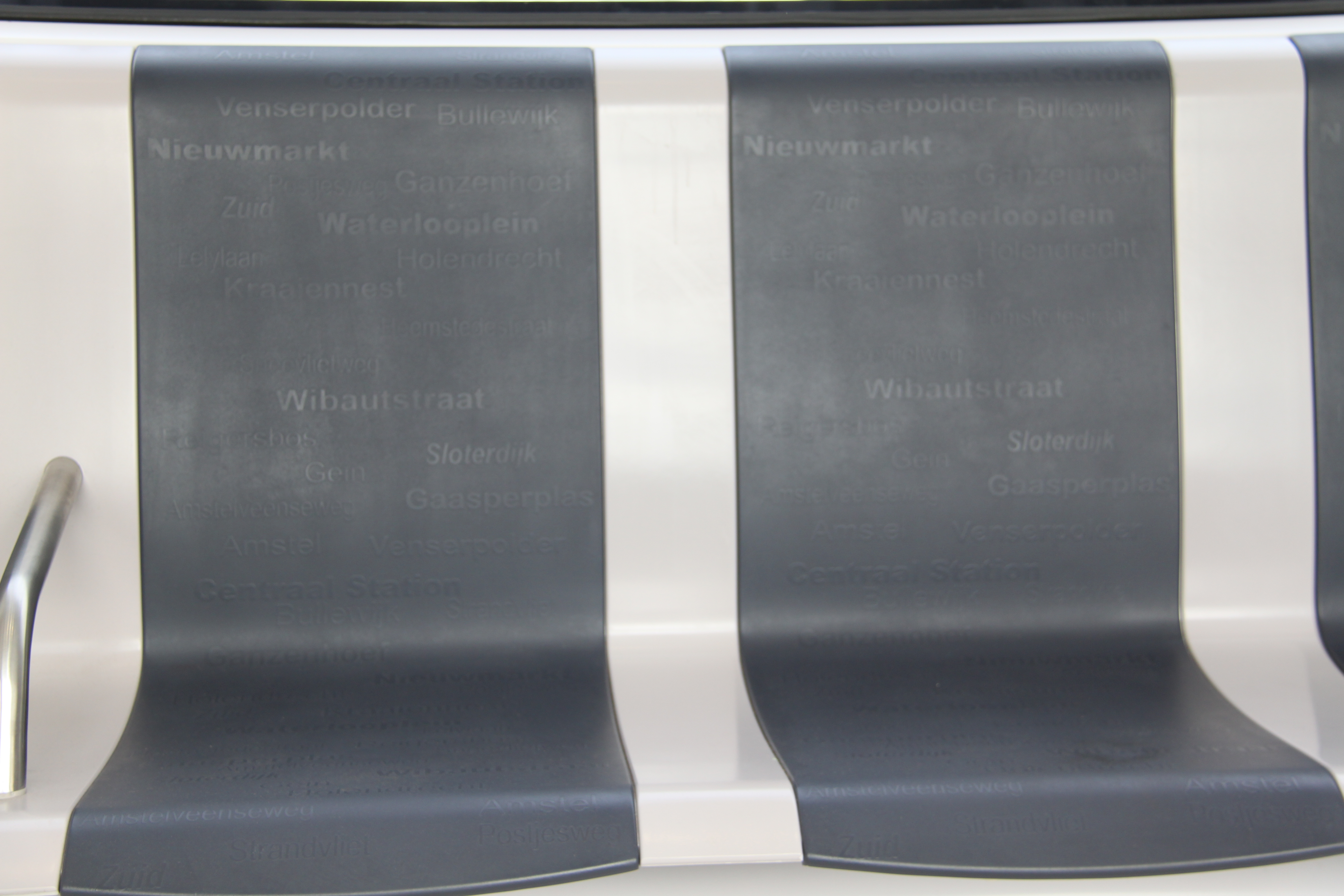
Seating bench

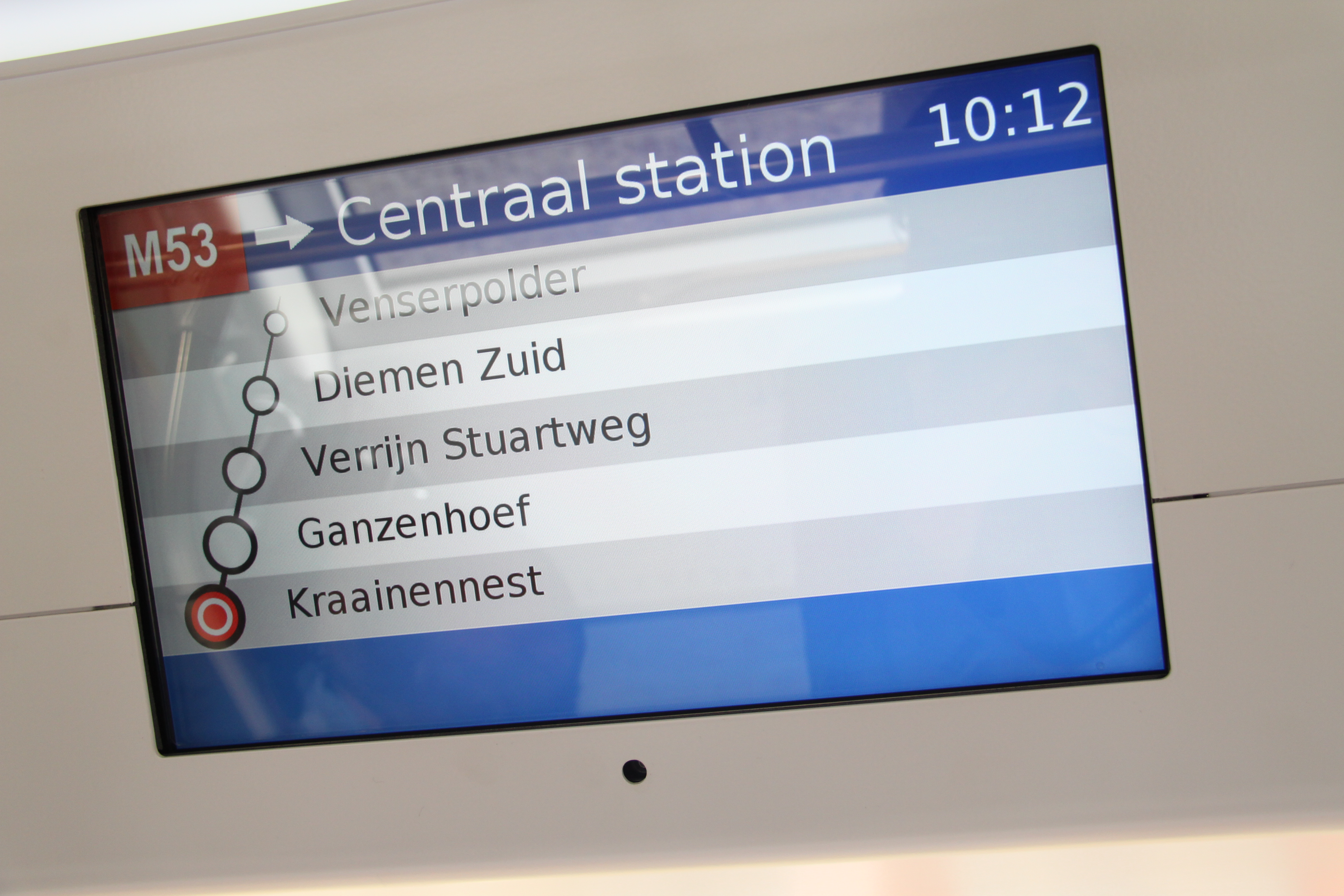
Passenger information screen

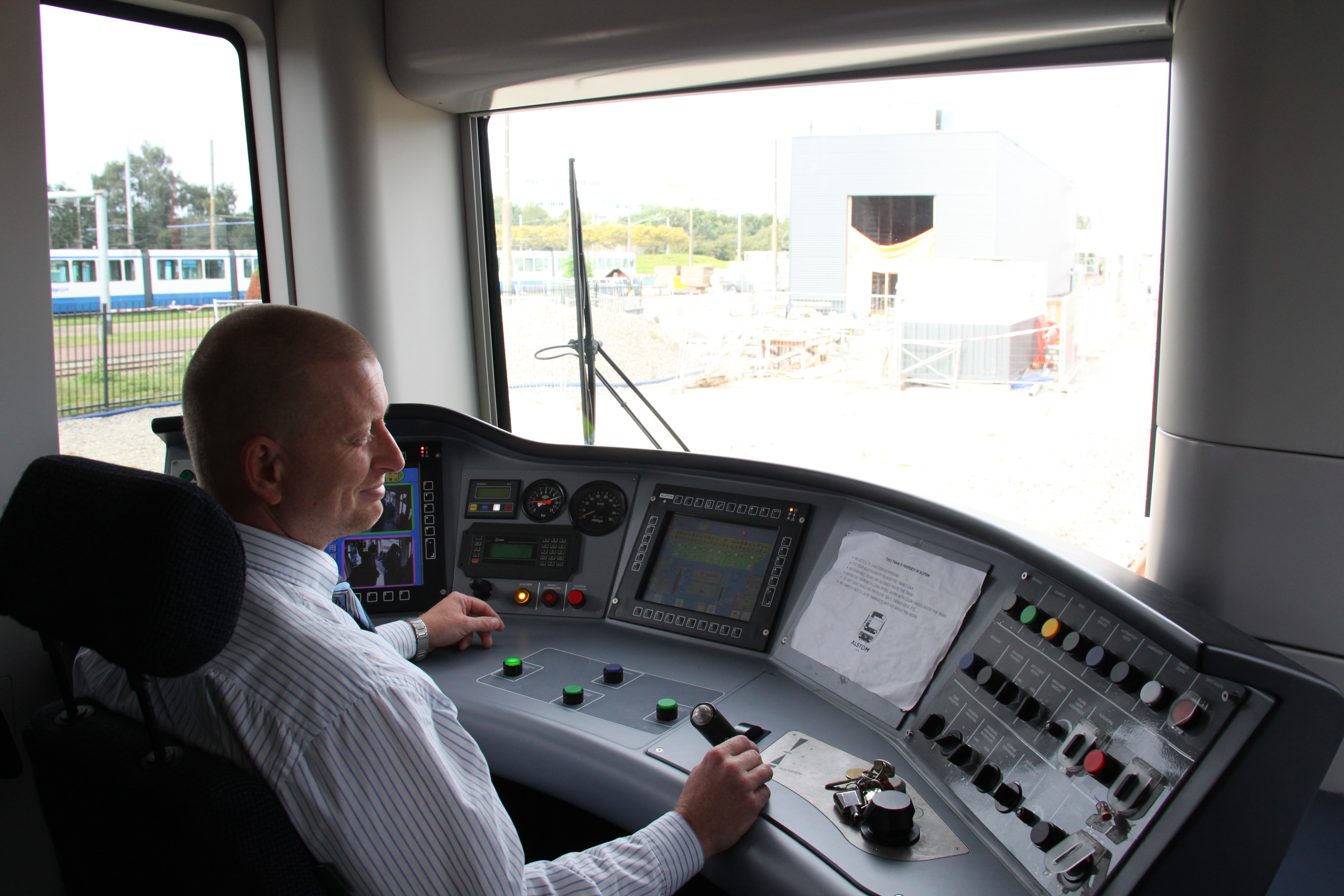
Driver's cab
