= M7 (Amsterdam Metro) =

CAF Inneo M7
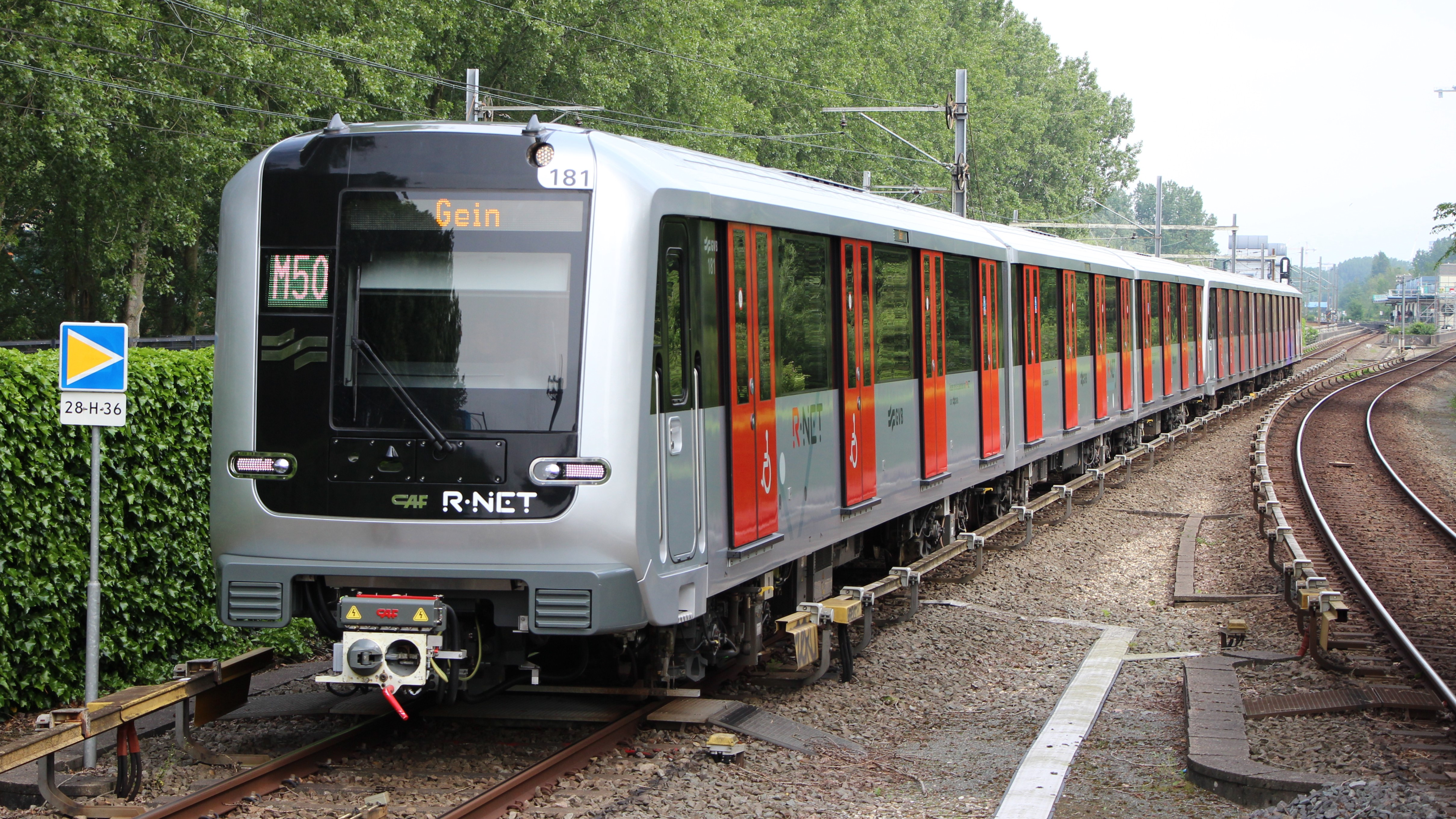
- A coupled M7 train at Heemstedestraat Station, May 2024
- Stock type: Electric multiple unit
- Manufacturer: CAF
- Family name: Inneo
- Replaced: M1/M2/M3 · S1/S2 · S3/M4
- Constructed: 2021–2024
- Entered service: 28 February 2023
- Number in service: 43 trainsets
- Formation: 3 cars per trainset
- Design code: TMc–M–TMc
- Fleet numbers: 163–205
- Capacity: 78 (seated); 402 (standing)
- Owners: Amsterdam Metro
- Operators: GVB
- Lines served: 50 Line 50; 53 Line 53; 54 Line 54

Specifications
- Train length: 59.6 m (195 ft 6 in)
- Width: 3.005 m (9 ft 10.3 in)
- Height: 3.8 m (12 ft 6 in)
- Floor height: 1.1 m (3 ft 7 in)
- Doors: 12 doors per side
- Wheel diameter: New: 850 mm (33 in); Worn: 760 mm (30 in)
- Maximum speed: 80 km/h (50 mph)
- Weight: 95 t (95,000 kg)
- Traction system: CAF IGBT-VVVF
- Transmission: CAF MIIRA AHM-355-7.44-1
- Acceleration: 1.2 m/s^{2} (4.3 km/(h⋅s))
- Deceleration: 1.3 m/s^{2} (4.7 km/(h⋅s))
- Electric system(s): Third rail, 750 V DC
- Current collection: Contact shoe
- UIC classification: 2′Bo′+Bo′Bo′+Bo′2′
- Track gauge: 1,435 mm (4 ft 8 1/2 in)

The CAF Inneo M7 is a series of electric multiple unit (EMU) trainsets used on the Amsterdam Metro network. The trains entered service on 28 February 2023 and are expected to remain in operation for at least 30 years.

Each M7 set consists of three carriages, with a total length of nearly 60 metres, roughly half the length of an M5 trainset. During peak hours, the M7 is typically operated in double formation to provide additional capacity, while single sets are used at other times to prevent overcapacity and facilitate more efficient maintenance.

The M7 currently operates on the East Line (Line 53 and Line 54) and the Ring Line (Line 50). Deployment on the North–South Line (Line 52) is not planned at this time.

CAF previously supplied the 37 S3/M4 trainsets used on the Ring Line in 1996, and in 2016 also won the contract to supply the 15G series trams for the Amsterdam Tram network.

== Description ==
=== Background ===
Several reasons led to the decision to buy new trains for the Amsterdam Metro:

- The S1/S2 series trains, metro/tram hybrid vehicles delivered between 1990 and 1994, needed to be replaced between 2021 and 2024;
- The S3/M4 series trains, metro/tram hybrid vehicles delivered in 1996 and 1997, are planned to be replaced by 2027;
- The number of passengers using the metro increased after the opening of Line 52 on 22 July 2018.

In 2012, as Amsterdam introduced its first M5 series trains—six-car units with open gangways and a total length of 116 metres (381 ft)—it became clear that such long trains could lead to overcapacity during off-peak hours and complicate maintenance, since all six carriages would need to be taken out of service at once. As a result, the city stopped further purchases after acquiring only 28 M5 trainsets. Instead, it chose to order the M7 series: shorter, three-car trains with open gangways and a total length of about 61 metres (200 ft). The M7 can operate in pairs during peak times to match the capacity of a single M5 train, while single sets can run during quieter periods, helping to avoid overcapacity and allowing for more flexible maintenance.

=== Purchase ===
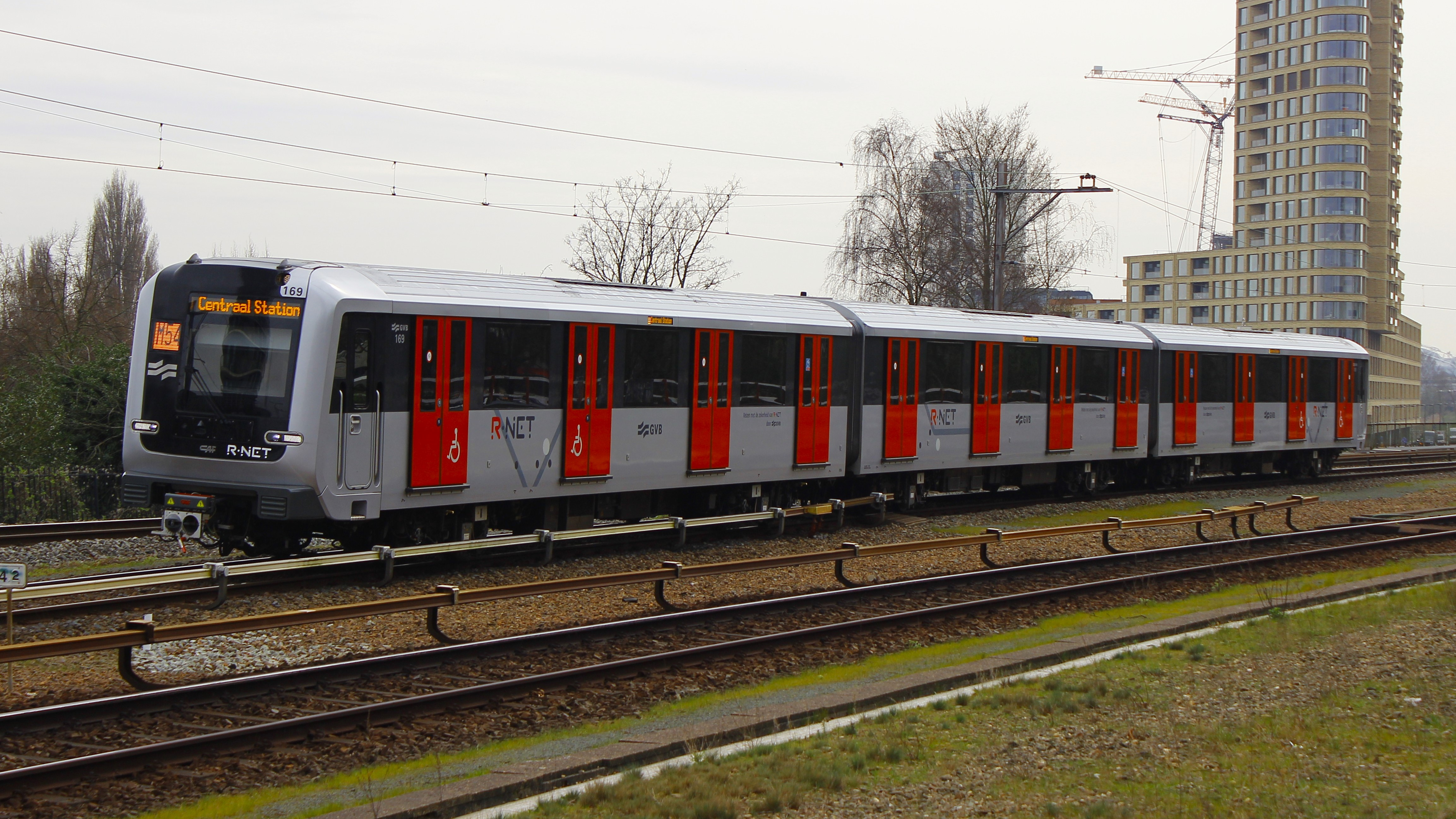
Set 169 arriving at Amstel station

In 2016, the Amsterdam regional transport authority and the GVB began planning for a new generation of metro trains by publishing a "Program of Requirements" that outlined the desired specifications.

The proposed design called for trains up to 61 metres (200 ft) long and 3 metres (9.8 ft) wide, with a capacity of approximately 450 passengers (including at least 75 seats), and the ability to operate in coupled formations. The trains were to feature a similar design and layout to the existing M5 series, whose styling references Amsterdam's earliest metro vehicles. At the time, planners estimated a need for 25 to 30 trainsets; this was finalized at 30 units in December 2016, and the procurement process formally began in January 2017.

Around the same time, the executive board of the regional transport authority requested a study into whether 80-metre-long (260 ft) trains might be a better fit for the system. An analysis by GVB suggested that longer trains could be more efficient under certain conditions. However, switching to the longer design at that stage would have caused delays, so the original 60-meter configuration was retained.

The supplier selection process concluded in April 2018, when GVB awarded the contract to Spanish manufacturer Construcciones y Auxiliar de Ferrocarriles (CAF). The €225 million order included 30 trainsets, with an option for up to 30 more.

Deliveries began with train No. 163, which arrived on 23 August 2021, and concluded with the delivery of train No. 192 on 28 November 2024.

Later, in July 2024, GVB confirmed plans to order between 11 and 13 additional trainsets by partially exercising its purchase option. The final number depends on the outcome of ongoing repairs to two damaged M5 units—if they can be restored, 11 new M7 trains will be ordered; otherwise, the total will be 13.

== Future ==
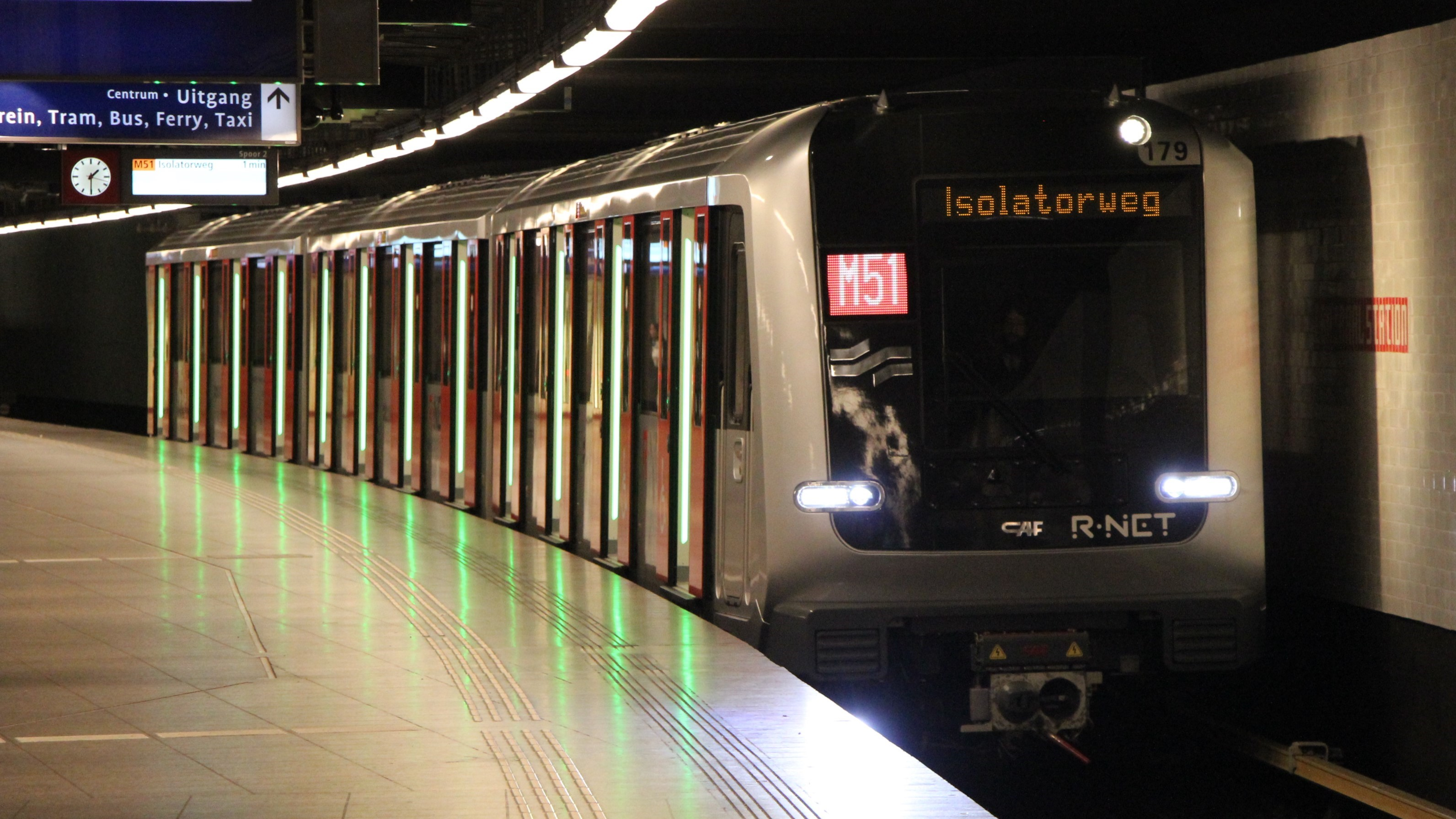
Set 179 on Line 51 bound for Isolatorweg at Amsterdam Centraal Station

The M7 series was required to support automatic train operation (ATO), a possible future upgrade to the Amsterdam Metro system.

In addition, the M7 must be compatible with platform screen doors. However, if platform screen doors are installed, these trains will no longer be able to run in coupled configurations on routes shared with M5 trains. This is because the offset at the coupling point would cause the doors of a coupled train to misalign with the position of the platform doors. Therefore, the procurement also took into account the possibility of future extensions, allowing these trains to be lengthened with additional carriages to a maximum length of 123 metres (404 ft).

In March 2018, it was discovered that incorrectly placed buffer stops at the East Line terminus at Amsterdam Centraal Station made it impossible for two coupled M7 trains to stop there until an adjustment could be made. Additionally, using coupled M7 trains on Line 52 is currently not possible due to the positioning of fire safety screens at Europaplein station.

== Gallery ==
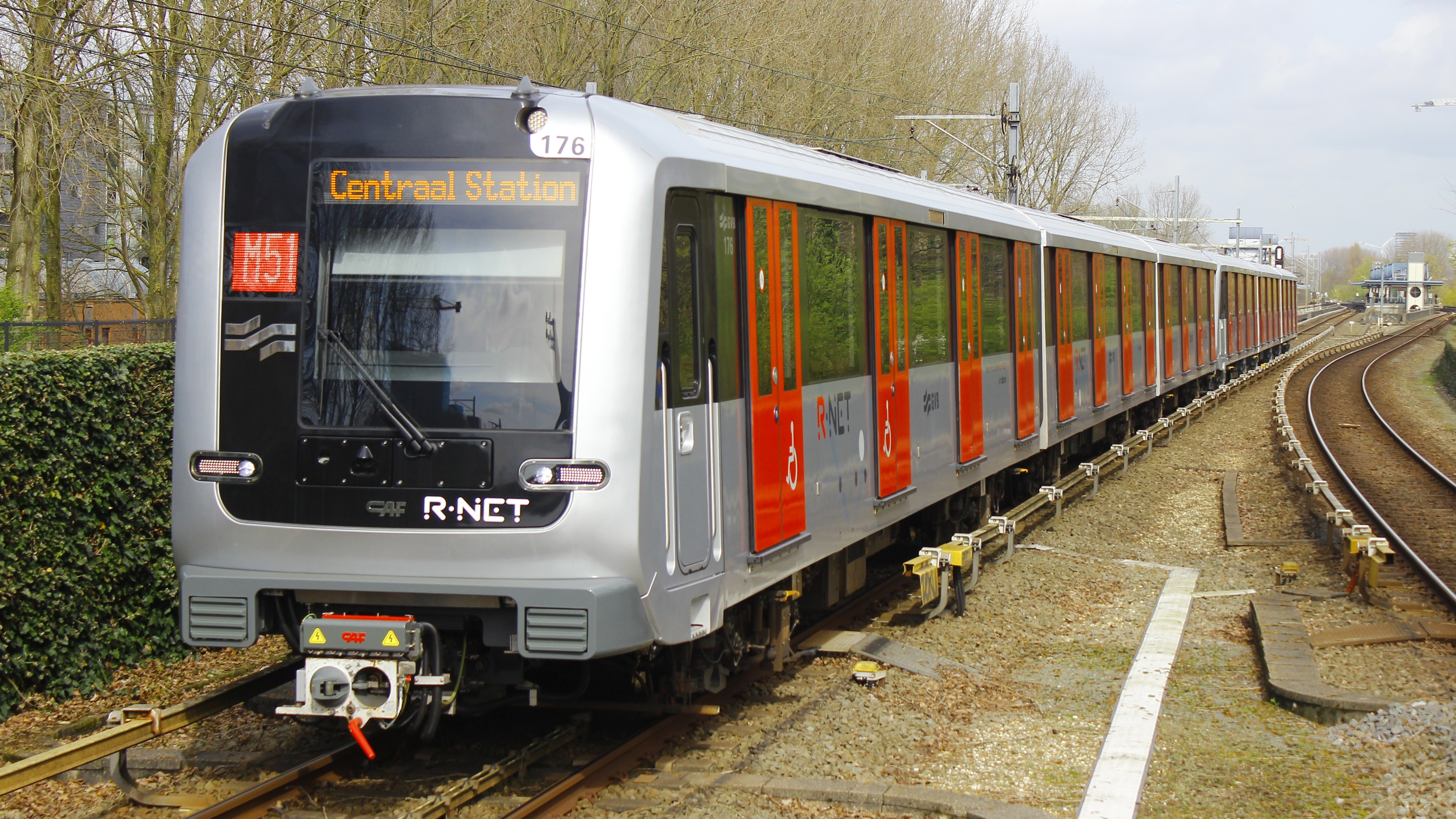
Two coupled M7 trainsets at Heemstedestraat

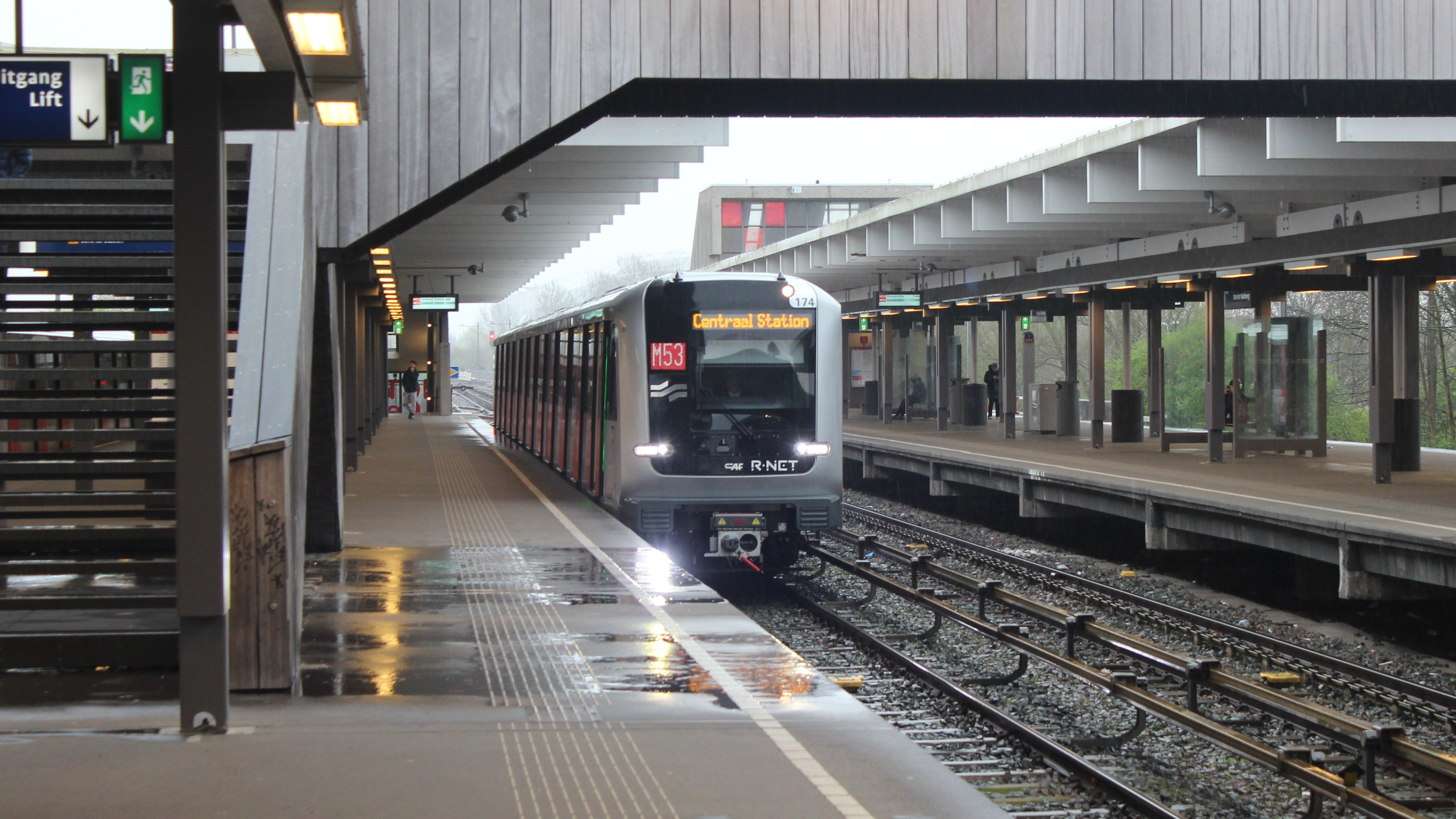
Set 174 at Van der Madeweg

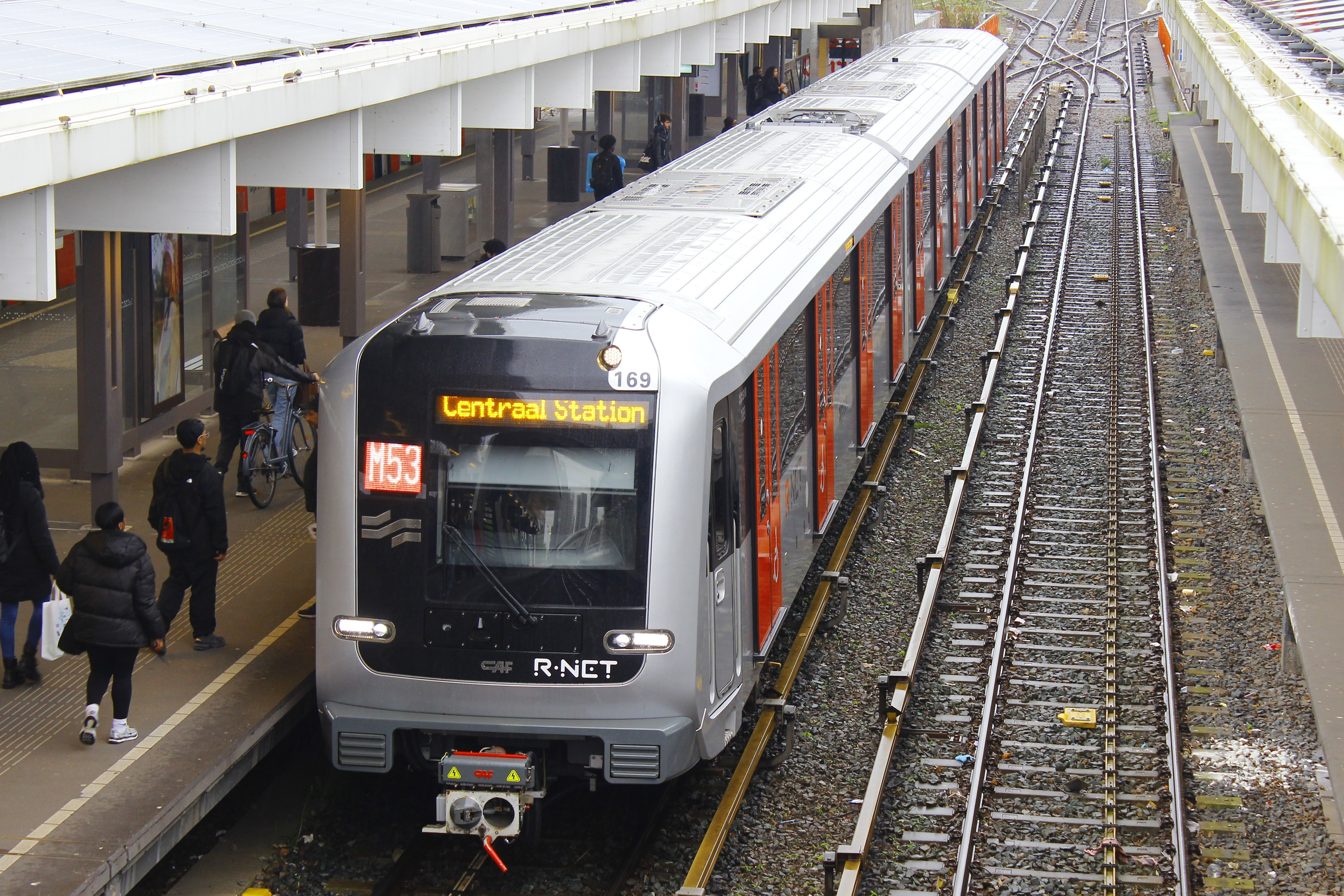
Set 169 at Van der Madeweg

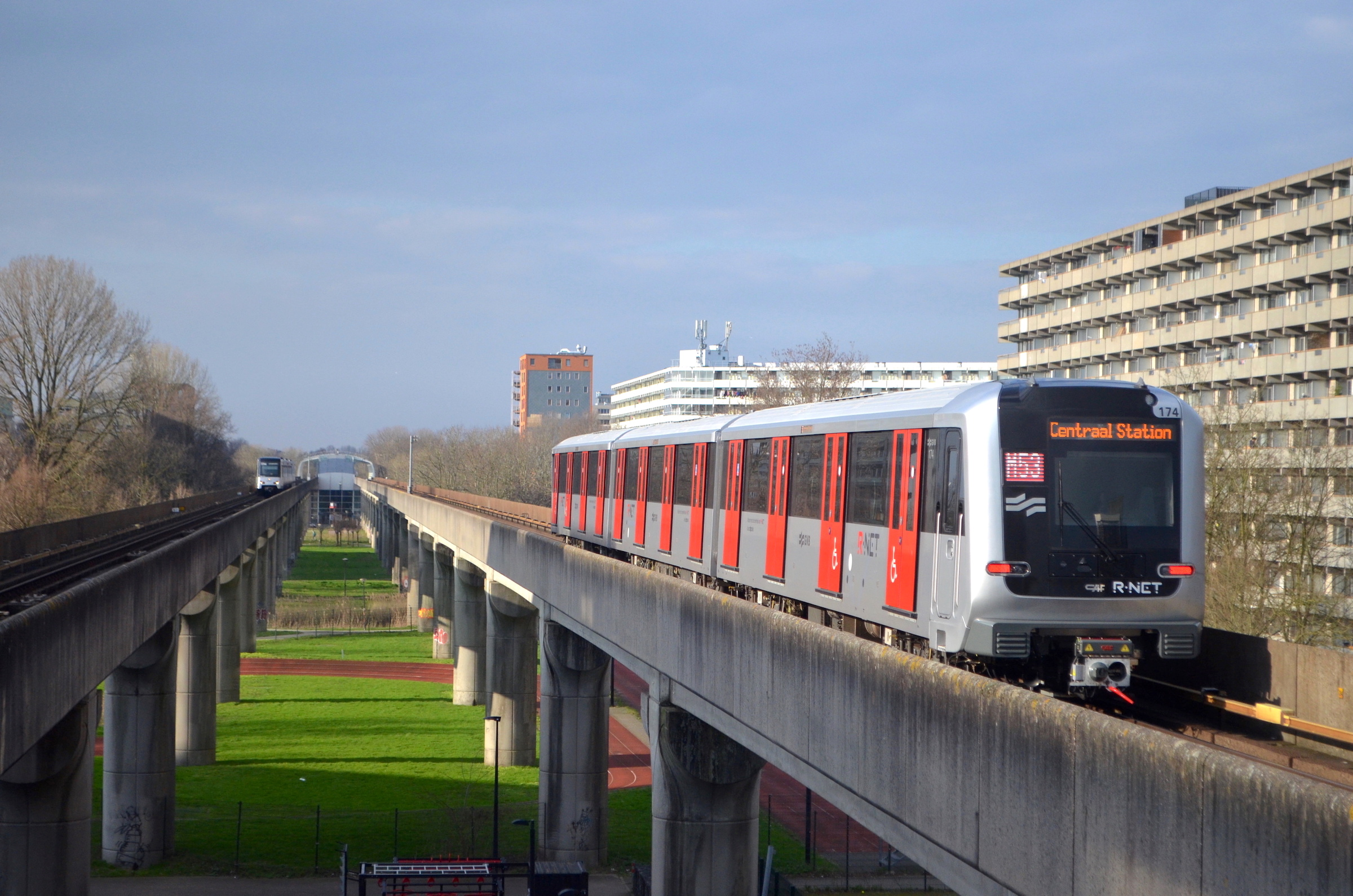
Set 174 on a viaduct at Kraaiennest
