= Henk Sneevlietweg metro station =

Metro station in Amsterdam

Henk Sneevlietweg
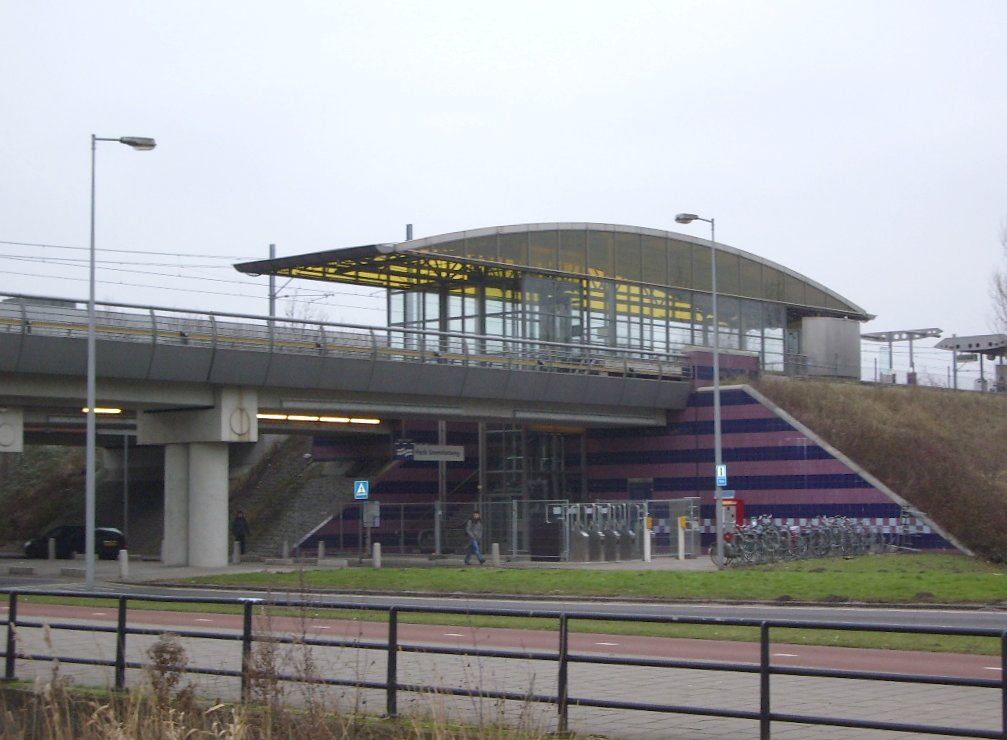

General information
- Location: Nieuw-West, Amsterdam; Netherlands
- Coordinates: 52°20′47″N 4°50′04″E
- Owner: GVB
- Platforms: 1 island platform
- Tracks: 2

Construction
- Structure type: Elevated

Other information
- Station code: HVW

History
- Opened: 28 May 1997; 29 years ago

Services
Preceding station	Amsterdam Metro	Following station
Amstelveenseweg towards Gein	Line 50	Heemstedestraat towards Isolatorweg
Amstelveenseweg towards Centraal Station	Line 51	Heemstedestraat towards Isolatorweg
Location
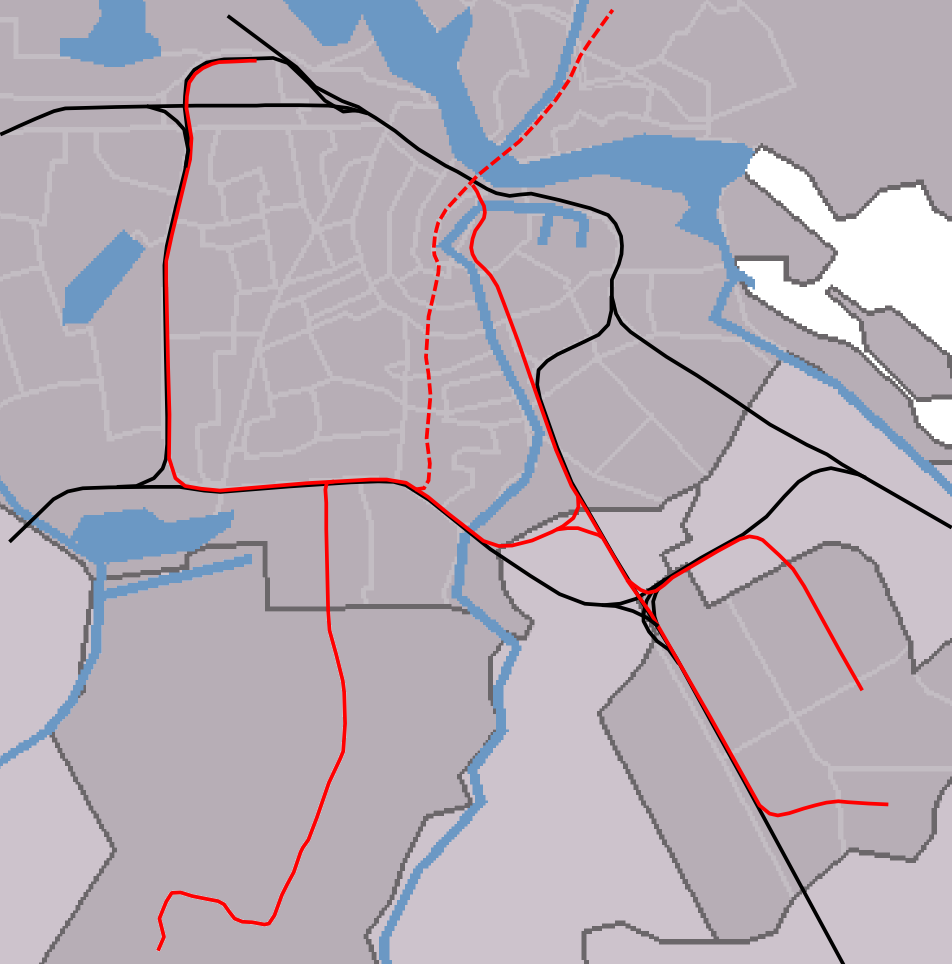
- Location within metro van Amsterdam

Henk Sneevlietweg is an Amsterdam Metro station in the south-west Amsterdam, Netherlands. The station opened in 1997 and is located in the suburb of Nieuw-West is served by line 50 and line 51. Henk Sneevlietweg opened on 28 May 1997.

The station is elevated above street level on a railway embankment. The station is named after the street on which its main entrance is located which, in turn, is named after Dutch politician Henk Sneevliet.

== Metro services ==
- 50 Isolatorweg - Sloterdijk - Lelylaan - Zuid - RAI - Duivendrecht - Bijlmer ArenA - Holendrecht - Gein
- 51 Isolatorweg - Sloterdijk - Lelylaan - Zuid - RAI - Amsterdam Amstel - Central Station

== Bus services ==
- 62 Station Lelylaan - Sloten - Hoofddorpplein - Haarlemmermeer - Stadionplein - VU - Zuid - Buitenveldert - RAI - Station Amstel
- 68 Henk Sneevlietweg - IBM - Riekerpolder
