= Amsterdam Lelylaan station =

Railway station in Amsterdam, Netherlands

Amsterdam Lelylaan
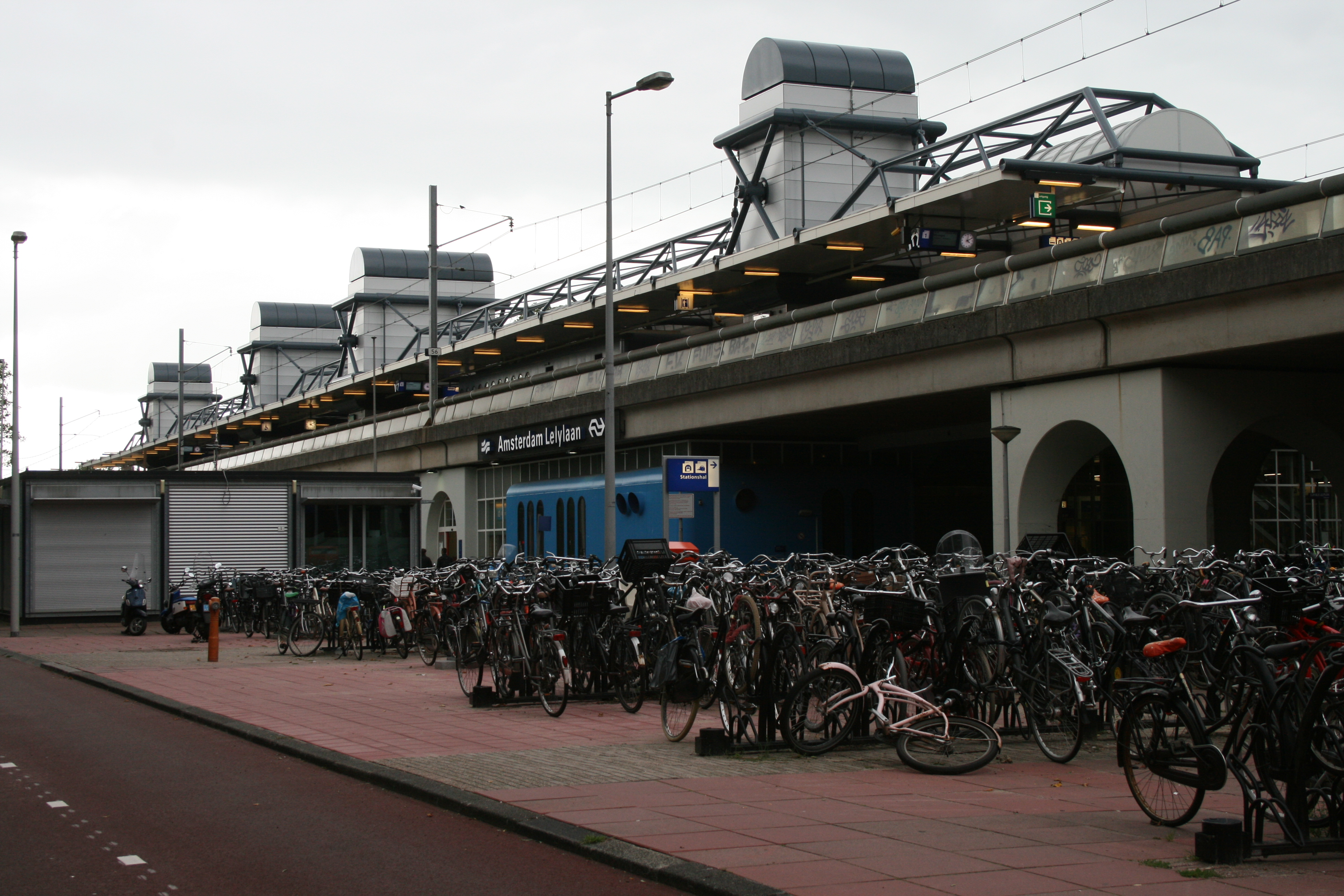
- West side of Amsterdam Lelylaan station

General information
- Location: Nieuw-West, Amsterdam; Netherlands
- Coordinates: 52°21′26″N 4°50′2″E
- Operator: Nederlandse Spoorwegen; Gemeente Vervoerbedrijf
- Lines: Amsterdam–Schiphol railway Metroline 50, Metroline 51
- Platforms: 2 (train); 2 Metro
- Connections: GVB Amsterdam Metro: 50, 51; GVB Amsterdam Tram: 1, 17; Connexxion: 195; GVB: 62, 63, 247

Other information
- Station code: Asdl

History
- Opened: 1 June 1986; 40 years ago

Services
| Preceding station | Nederlandse Spoorwegen | Following station |
|---|---|---|
| Schiphol Airport towards Hoofddorp | NS Sprinter 4100 | Amsterdam Sloterdijk towards Hoorn Kersenboogerd |
| Schiphol Airport towards Hoofddorp | NS Sprinter 8100 | Amsterdam Sloterdijk towards Amsterdam Centraal |
| Schiphol Airport towards Hoofddorp | NS Sprinter 8200 | Amsterdam Sloterdijk towards Amsterdam Centraal |
| Schiphol Airport towards Hoofddorp | NS Sprinter 8300 | Amsterdam Sloterdijk towards Amsterdam Centraal |
| Schiphol Airport towards Hoofddorp | NS Sprinter 8400 | Amsterdam Sloterdijk towards Amsterdam Centraal |
| Preceding station | Amsterdam Metro | Following station |
| Heemstedestraat towards Gein | Line 50 | Postjesweg towards Isolatorweg |
| Heemstedestraat towards Centraal Station | Line 51 | Postjesweg towards Isolatorweg |
Location
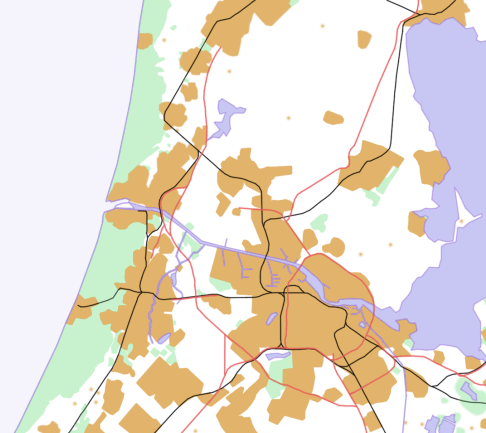
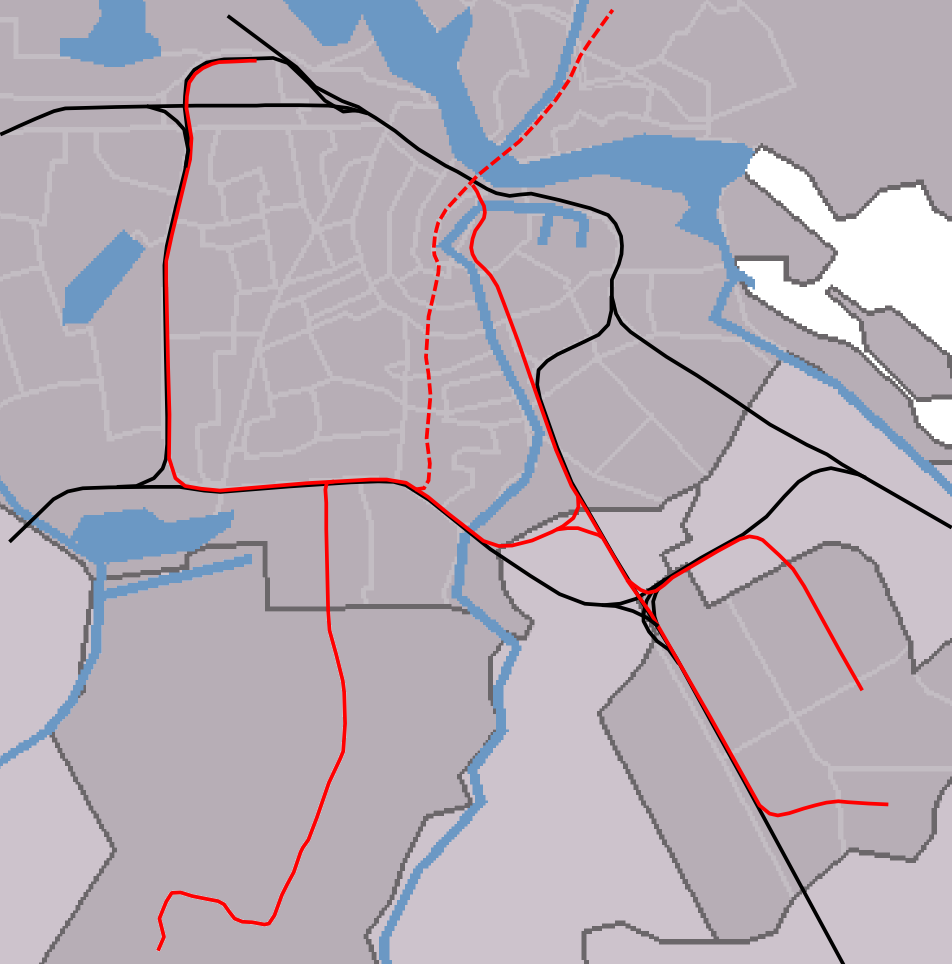
- Location within Northern Randstad Location within metro van Amsterdam Location within Netherlands

Amsterdam Lelylaan is a railway, metro, tram and bus station in west Amsterdam. It is served by trains of the Nederlandse Spoorwegen and metros of the GVB. The station opened on 1 June 1986. It is located on the Amsterdam-Schiphol railway, a few km south of Amsterdam Sloterdijk railway station. South of this station, trains turn west towards Schiphol railway station, while metros turn east towards Amsterdam Zuid railway station. The station is located in the Amsterdam borough of Slotervaart, on a long viaduct spanning three roads.

== History ==
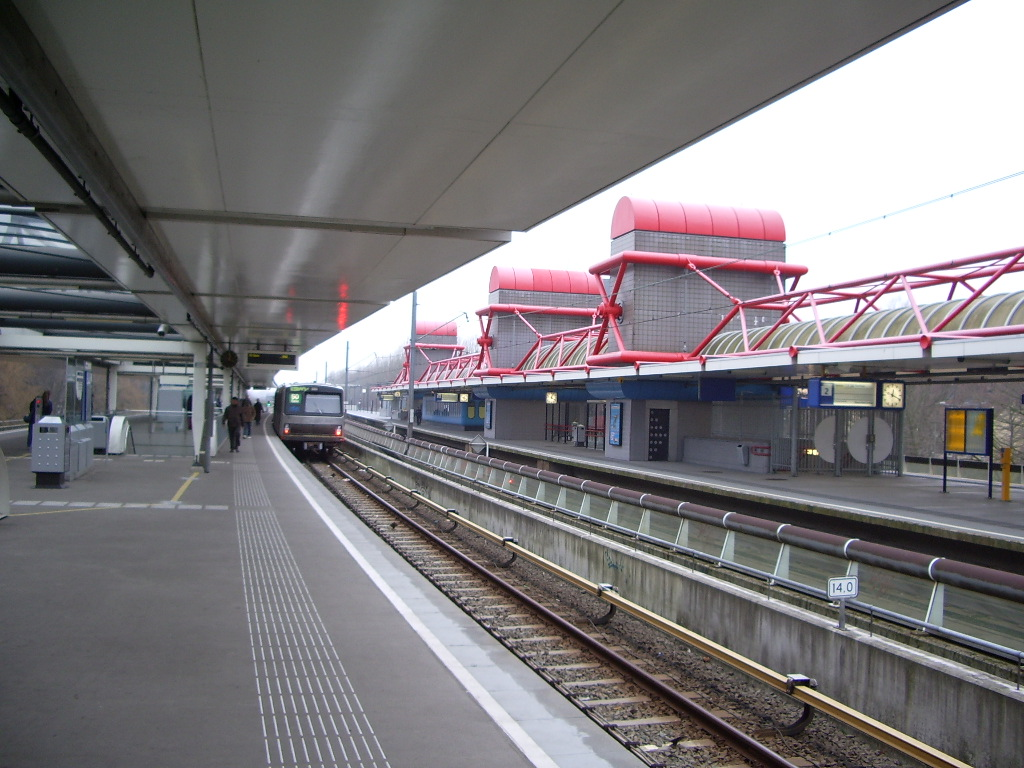
Platforms for Metro on the left and NS trains on the right

=== Construction ===
The station was built in 1986 when a link was constructed from Amsterdam Centraal to Schiphol Airport. The new line reduced journey time from Centraal Station and Schiphol to as little as 16 minutes. The other stations built on this line were Amsterdam Sloterdijk (rebuilt) and Amsterdam De Vlugtlaan. De Vlugtlaan was closed in May 2000 to enable construction of the Hemboog, which enabled direct connections to Zaandam and beyond since 2003.

=== Nederlandse Spoorwegen ===
For its first 10 years, Intercity trains called at Lelylaan station, providing direct services to places as far away as Brussels, Berlin and Leeuwarden. From 1996 to 2006, only stopping trains called at this station. In 2006 an intercity service Schiphol-Amsterdam Centraal-Lelystad was introduced, which also calls at Lelylaan. Since December 2016, only stopping trains call at the station once again.

=== GVB ===
The metro platform is an island platform, which has a direct link onto GVB tram lines 1 and 17. The main entrance is further south. In the early 2000s the stairs to the tram lines were closed off with fences to counter fare evasion, which was running high, with people running off the train and straight onto a tram. Early 2007 the gates were opened again, but only during daytime.

Until 1988 the only tram here had been the 1, but in that year the 17 was extended from Surinameplein to Osdorp. The two lines follow different routes into the city centre. In 1997 GVB opened its fourth metro line, the 50 (Isolatorweg - Gein).

The station is also served by a bus station.

== Train services ==
As of 15 December 2025, the following train services call at this station:

- Local Sprinter services Hoofddorp - Schiphol - Zaandam - Hoorn Kersenboogerd
- Local Sprinter services Hoofddorp - Schiphol - Amsterdam

== Tram services ==
The current tram situation has its origin in December 2001. The first tram in this area was in 1954, when line 1 ran to Slotermeer. It was extended in 1962. In 1988 line 17 was extended to Osdorp as well, after it used to terminate at Surinameplein 1 km east of Lelylaan. Line 1 terminated at Dijkgraafplein and line 17 terminated at the Osdorpplein, near Meer en Vaart. In 2001 the current service pattern came into operation.

| Tram Service | Operator | From | To | Via | Frequency |
|---|---|---|---|---|---|
| 1 | GVB | Muiderpoort station | Osdorp De Aker | Weesperplein, Leidseplein, Overtoom, Surinameplein, Station Lelylaan, Pieter Calandlaan (Osdorp) | Up to 10x per hour |
| 17 | GVB | Centraal Station | Osdorp Dijkgraafplein | Westermarkt, Busstation Elandsgracht, Kinkerstraat, Surinameplein, Station Lelylaan, Osdorpplein | Up to 10x per hour |

== Bus services ==
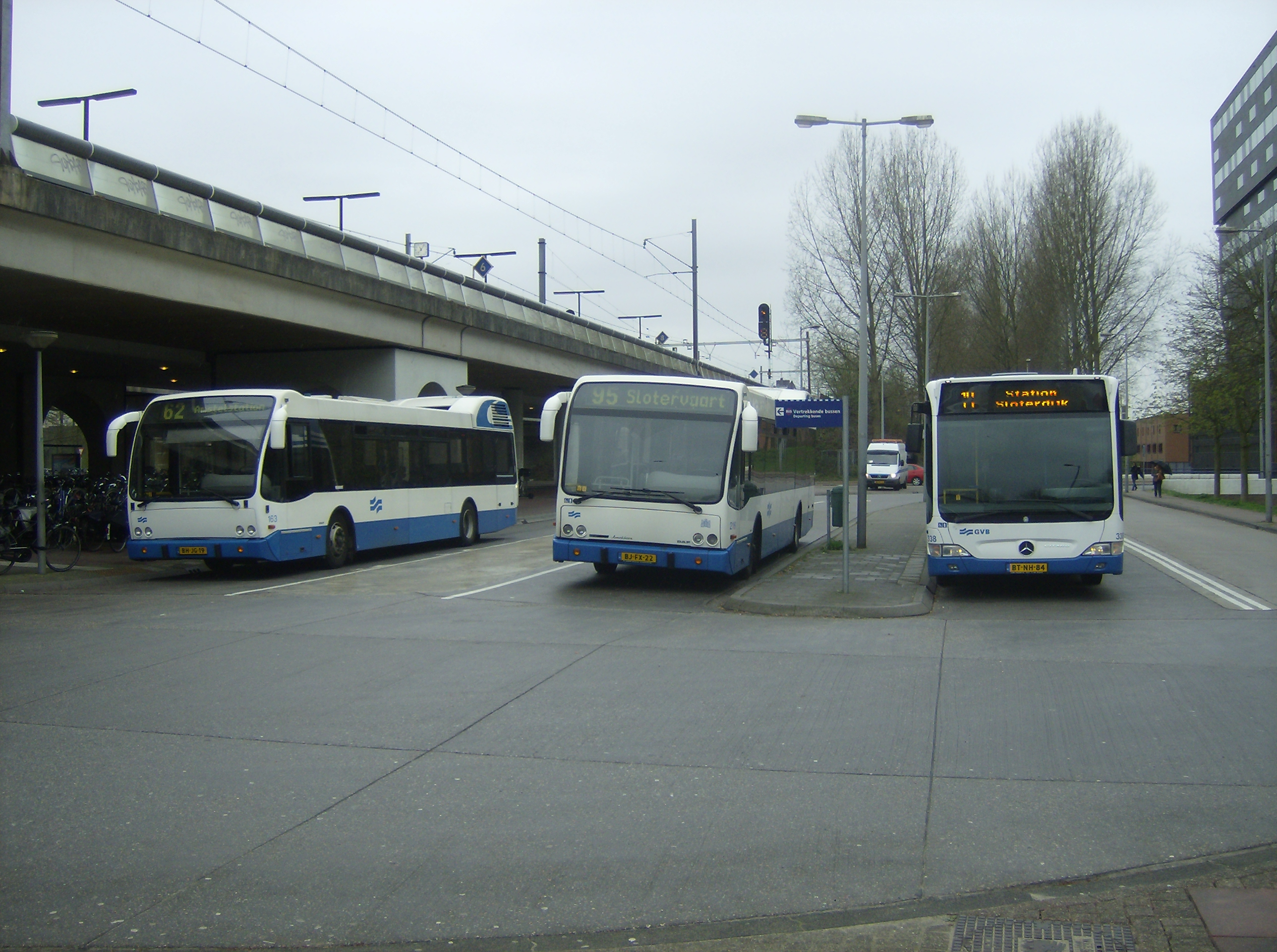
The former bus station

These services are operated by GVB.

- 62 Station Lelylaan - Slotervaart - Hoofddorpplein - Haarlemmermeer - Stadionplein - VU - Zuid - Buitenveldert - RAI - Station Amstel
- 63 Station Lelylaan - Slotervaart - Osdorpplein - Osdorper Ban - Osdorp de Aker
- 247 Bos en Lommer - Station Lelylaan - Schiphol Noord - Schiphol Zuid

This service is operated by Connexxion.

- 195 Station Lelylaan - Sloten - Badhoevedorp - Schiphol Noord
