= Line 50 (Amsterdam Metro) =

Metro line in Amsterdam, Netherlands

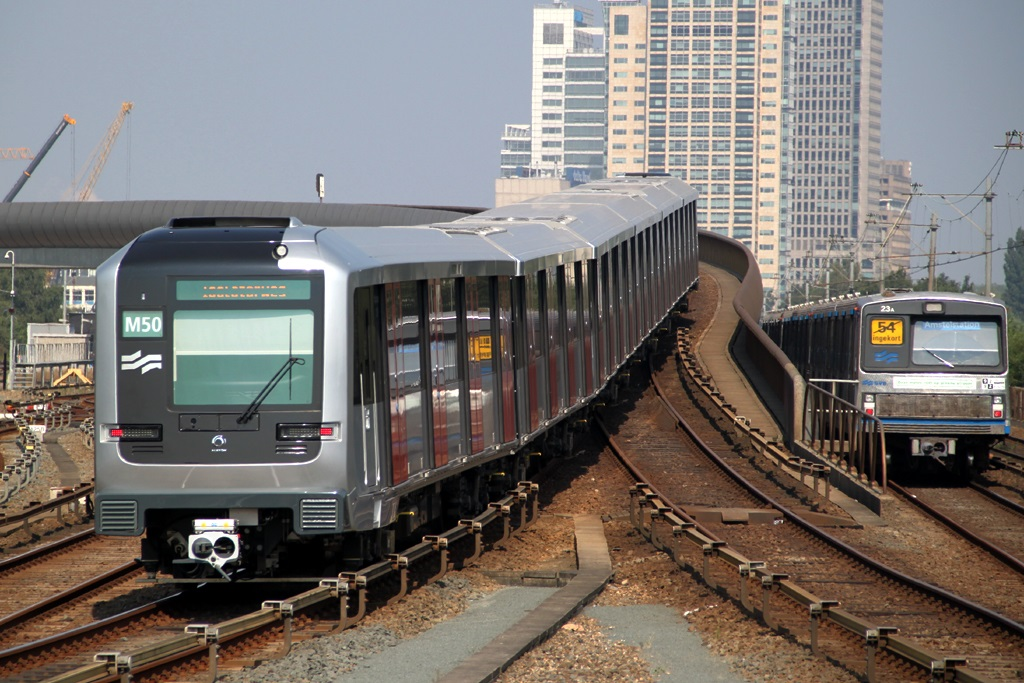
- A M5 series train on line 50, at the Spaklerweg viaduct

Overview
- Native name: Metrolijn 50 / Ringlijn
- Owner: Amsterdam Metro
- Locale: Amsterdam
- Termini: Isolatorweg; Gein
- Stations: 20
- Color on map: Green

Service
- Type: Rapid transit
- Operator(s): GVB
- Rolling stock: S3/M4; M5; M7

History
- Opened: 28 May 1997; 28 years ago

Technical
- Line length: 20.5 km (12.7 mi)
- Number of tracks: Double-track
- Track gauge: 1,435 mm (4 ft 8 1/2 in) standard gauge
- Electrification: Third rail, 750 V DC
- Operating speed: 70 km/h (43 mph)
Route map

Line 50 (Dutch: Metrolijn 50), also known as the Ring Line (Dutch: Ringlijn), is a line of the Amsterdam Metro system. It runs between Isolatorweg in the northwestern borough of Westpoort and Gein in the southeastern neighborhood of Gaasperdam. Despite its tangential route, the line is referred to as the Ring Line because it follows the embankment of the Ringspoorbaan (lit. 'ring railway') between Sloterdijk and the Rozenoordbrug over the Amstel.

== Service ==
Train frequency
Time period	Frequency
Rush hour and daytime	10 minutes
Early morning (before 07:00), evenings (after 20:00), and weekends (before 10:00)	15 minutes
Evenings (until 20:00) and weekends (after 10:00)	12 minutes
Midsummer rush hour and daytime	12 minutes
Midsummer early morning, evenings, and weekends	15 minutes

In principle, 3 coupled sets operate on line 50 from Monday to Friday (also in the evenings) and 2 coupled sets on Saturdays and Sundays. Until November 1998, single sets operated on Sundays and all evenings. Around 2000, 4 coupled sets were scheduled for a short time, but due to a shortage of rolling stock, these were soon discontinued. In the period 2013–2015, the CAF sets were partially replaced and the LHB rolling stock completely replaced by the M5 rolling stock, which has a much larger capacity than 3 CAF sets. M7 rolling stock has also been in service since 2023. From 3 March 2019 to mid-March 2024, the S1/S2 light rail rolling stock also operated.

=== Station list ===
Line	Transfers	Borough
Isolatorweg	51 Line 51	Westpoort
Sloterdijk	51 Line 51; Amsterdam–Haarlem–Rotterdam railway; Den Helder–Amsterdam railway; Amsterdam–Schiphol railway	Westpoort
De Vlugtlaan	51 Line 51	Nieuw-West
Jan van Galenstraat	51 Line 51	Nieuw-West
Postjesweg	51 Line 51	Nieuw-West
Lelylaan	51 Line 51; Amsterdam–Schiphol railway	Nieuw-West
Heemstedestraat	51 Line 51	Nieuw-West
Henk Sneevlietweg	51 Line 51	Nieuw-West
Amstelveenseweg	51 Line 51	Zuid
Zuid	51 Line 51; 52 Line 52; Weesp–Leiden railway	Zuid
RAI	51 Line 51; Weesp–Leiden Line	Zuid
Overamstel	51 Line 51	Oost
Van der Madeweg	53 Line 53; 54 Line 54	Ouder-Amstel
Duivendrecht	54 Line 54; Amsterdam–Arnhem railway; Weesp–Leiden railway	Ouder-Amstel
Strandvliet	54 Line 54	Zuidoost
Bijlmer ArenA	54 Line 54; Amsterdam–Arnhem railway	Zuidoost
Bullewijk	54 Line 54	Zuidoost
Holendrecht	54 Line 54; Amsterdam–Arnhem railway	Zuidoost
Reigersbos	54 Line 54	Zuidoost
Gein	54 Line 54	Zuidoost

== History ==
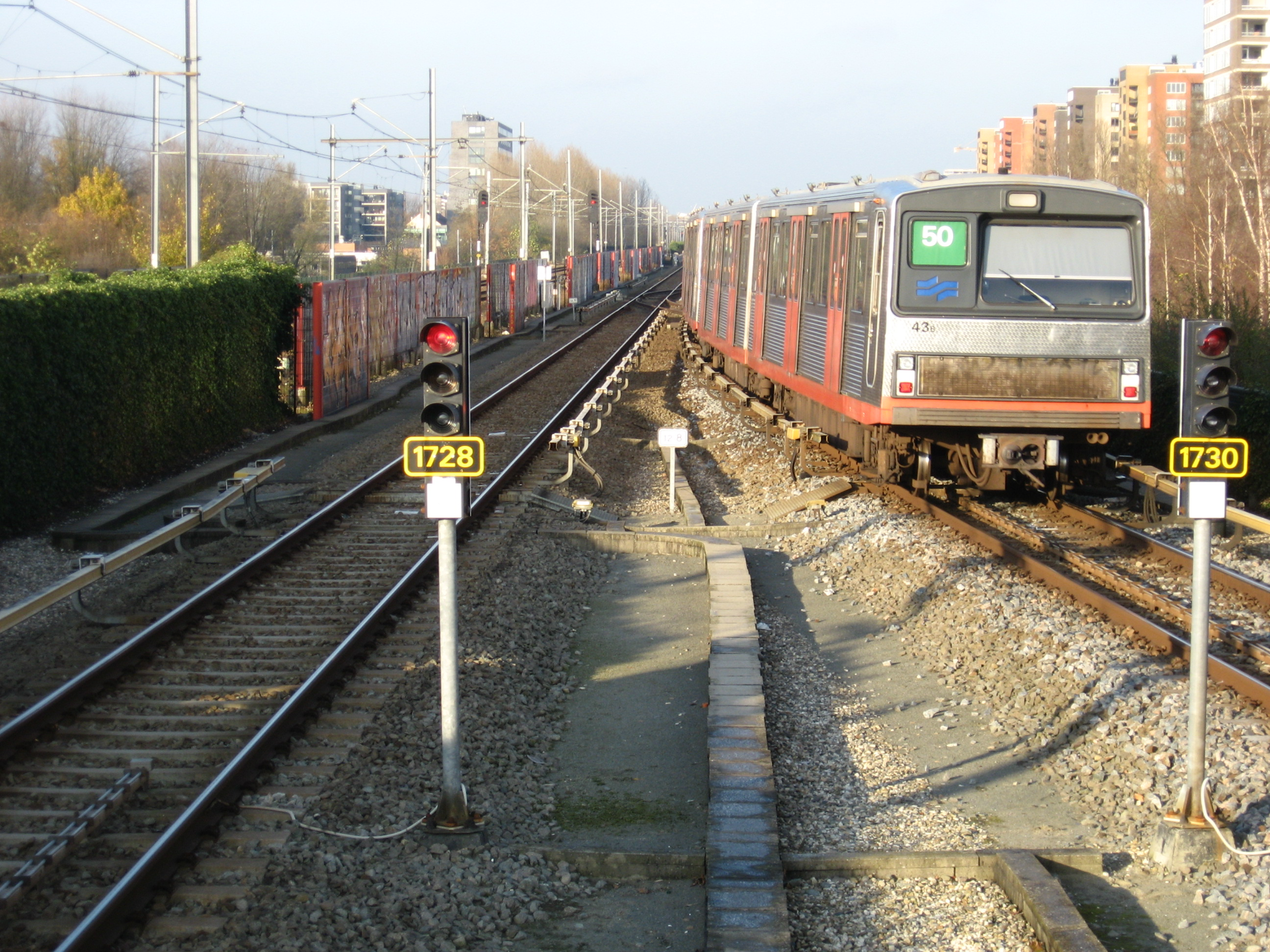
A former M1 series EMU near the Heemstedestraat station, 2008

The construction was decided upon by the Amsterdam city council in 1992. For political reasons, the line was initially called the "ring rapid tram"; since the Nieuwmarkt riots in 1975, the term "metro" had been more or less taboo in Amsterdam politics. Construction of the line began in 1992. Originally, the section between Zuid station and Sloterdijk was to be equipped with overhead lines, but this was later abandoned and the entire line was given a third rail.

Initially, the GVB did not have high expectations of transport outside peak hours and even considered not operating the line in the evenings and on Sundays if the government would not guarantee the operating deficit. In the end, this did happen. The line was officially opened by Minister Jorritsma on 28 May 1997 and was put into use for passenger transport on 1 June. Due to problems with the rolling stock and security, only a limited fifteen-minute service could initially be operated, but despite this, bus line 48, which was replaced by line 50, was discontinued. After the summer, the frequency was increased to a ten-minute service and the full service could only be operated with the winter service.

The route starts at Isolatorweg station. To the east of the station is a four-track tail track. This was expanded in 2014 to a large marshalling yard where minor maintenance can also be carried out on metro vehicles. Some of these extra tracks were laid on either side of the metro station. From Sloterdijk, the line runs north–south parallel to the western branch of the Ringspoorbaan. After Henk Sneevlietweg station, the route bends almost perpendicularly to the east, and then runs west–east parallel to the southern branch of the Ringspoorbaan and the Ringweg-Zuid (A10). Zuid station is reached via Amstelveenseweg station. After this, the line follows the route of metro/light rail line 51, which opened in 1990 (since March 2019 metro line 51, which runs from Isolatorweg together with line 50) to beyond Overamstel station.

Via two single-track viaducts, which were awarded the Concrete Prize in 1995, the line connects to the existing line 54 at Van der Madeweg station in a south-easterly direction to Gein station. Contrary to what the name suggests, there is therefore no ring at all. It is actually a tangential line. There are plans to extend the route beyond Isolatorweg, but the form is still undecided. Initially, the line was to be extended to Amsterdam Centraal station in 2005, which would close the ring. The plans were then postponed until 2010. In the Amsterdam Public Transport Vision 2007-2020 it was announced that there are several options after the extension to the Houthavens: instead of the previously planned extension to Amsterdam Centraal, preference would be given to extending via a tunnel under the IJ to Noorderpark station, part of the North/South Line. Amsterdam had its hands full with the latter line, and it is unlikely that the extension of the Ring Line will commence in the short term.

== Features ==
As a tangential metro line passing through the Amsterdam urban area, this line crosses many radial transport routes between the city center and the suburbs. Additionally, it runs parallel to the western and southern ring railway and the railway to Utrecht. As a result, the line has numerous transfer points to other metros, trains, and trams at locations such as Sloterdijk, Lelylaan, Zuid, and RAI.

Between Van der Madeweg and Gein, the line follows the important radial axis ArenA–Amsterdam UMC. This gives the line many significant stops, including Van der Madeweg, Duivendrecht, Bijlmer ArenA, and Holendrecht. Even at slightly less prominent stops in Amsterdam Nieuw-West, there are often connecting tram or bus lines.

The line also passes by several key office districts, hospitals, and other complexes such as the RAI, Vrije Universiteit, and the ArenA area. Until 2019, when line 51 also started operating on this route, it was the only metro line connecting Sloterdijk to the Zuidas. These features help explain why the line is used more frequently than initially expected. The decline in ridership on bus lines that served this connection before 1997 also played a role in this shift.

== Gallery ==
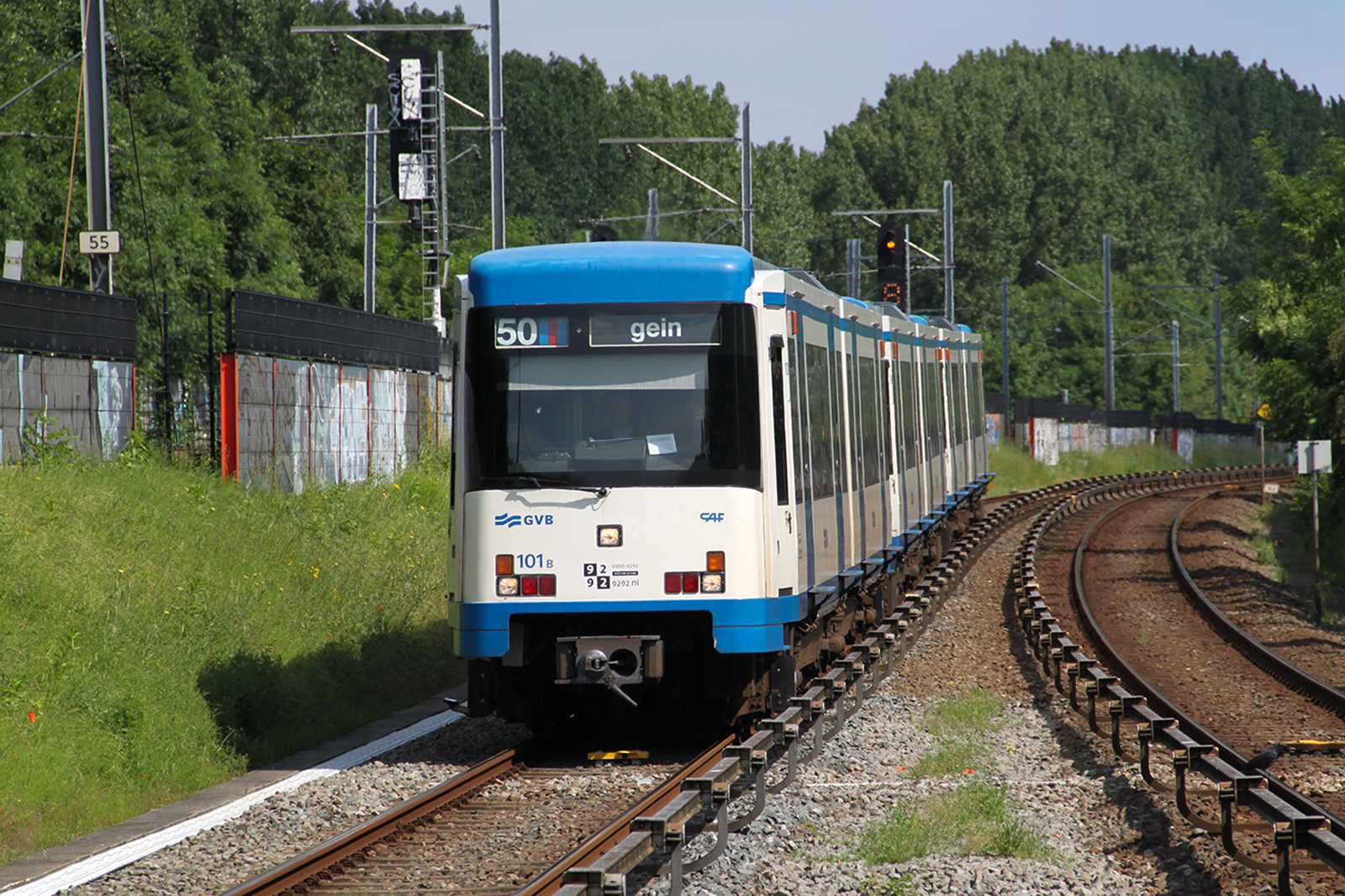
A M4 series EMU near the Postjesweg station

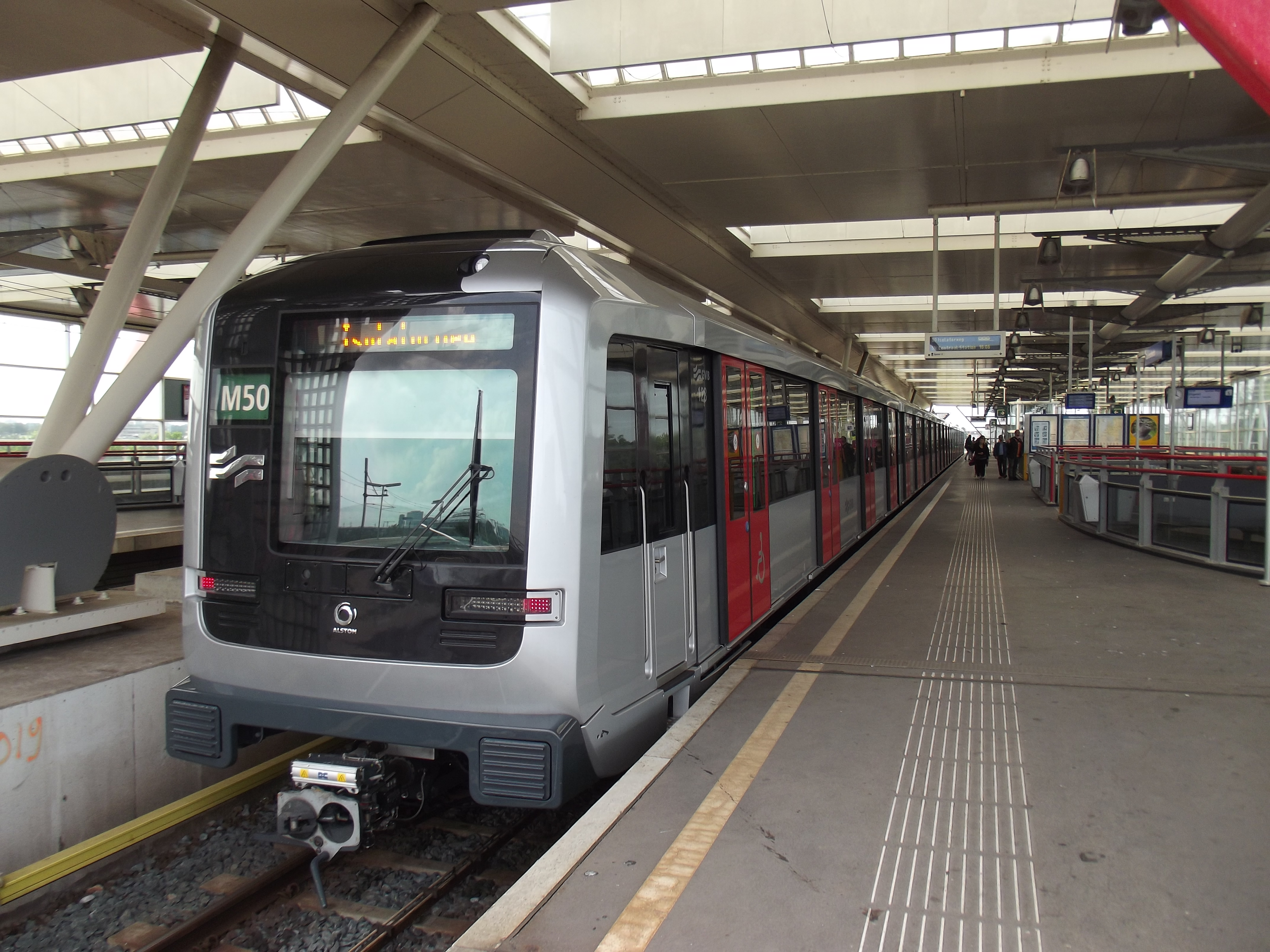
A M5 series EMU at Duivendrecht station

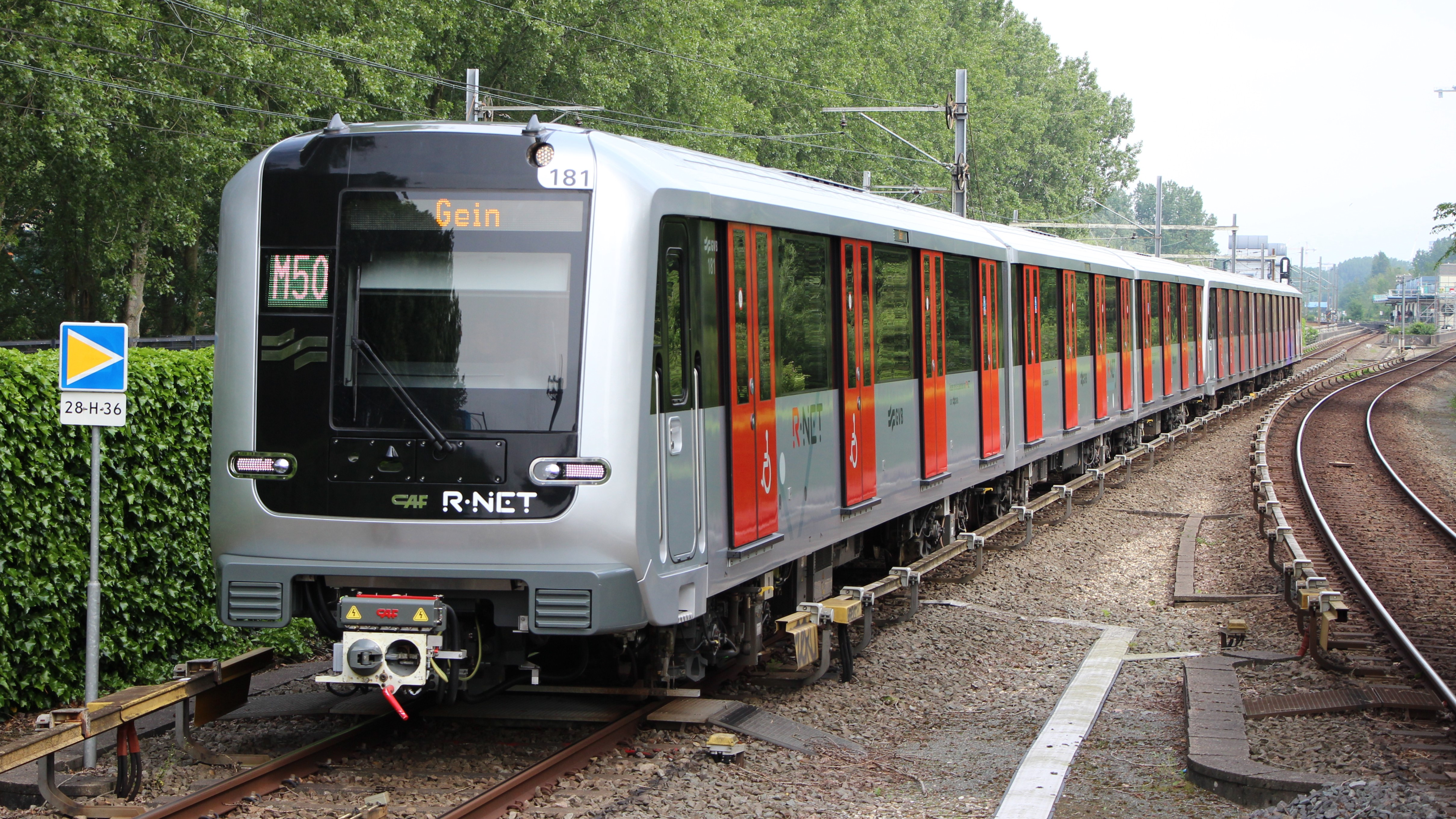
A M7 series EMU at Heemstedestraat station

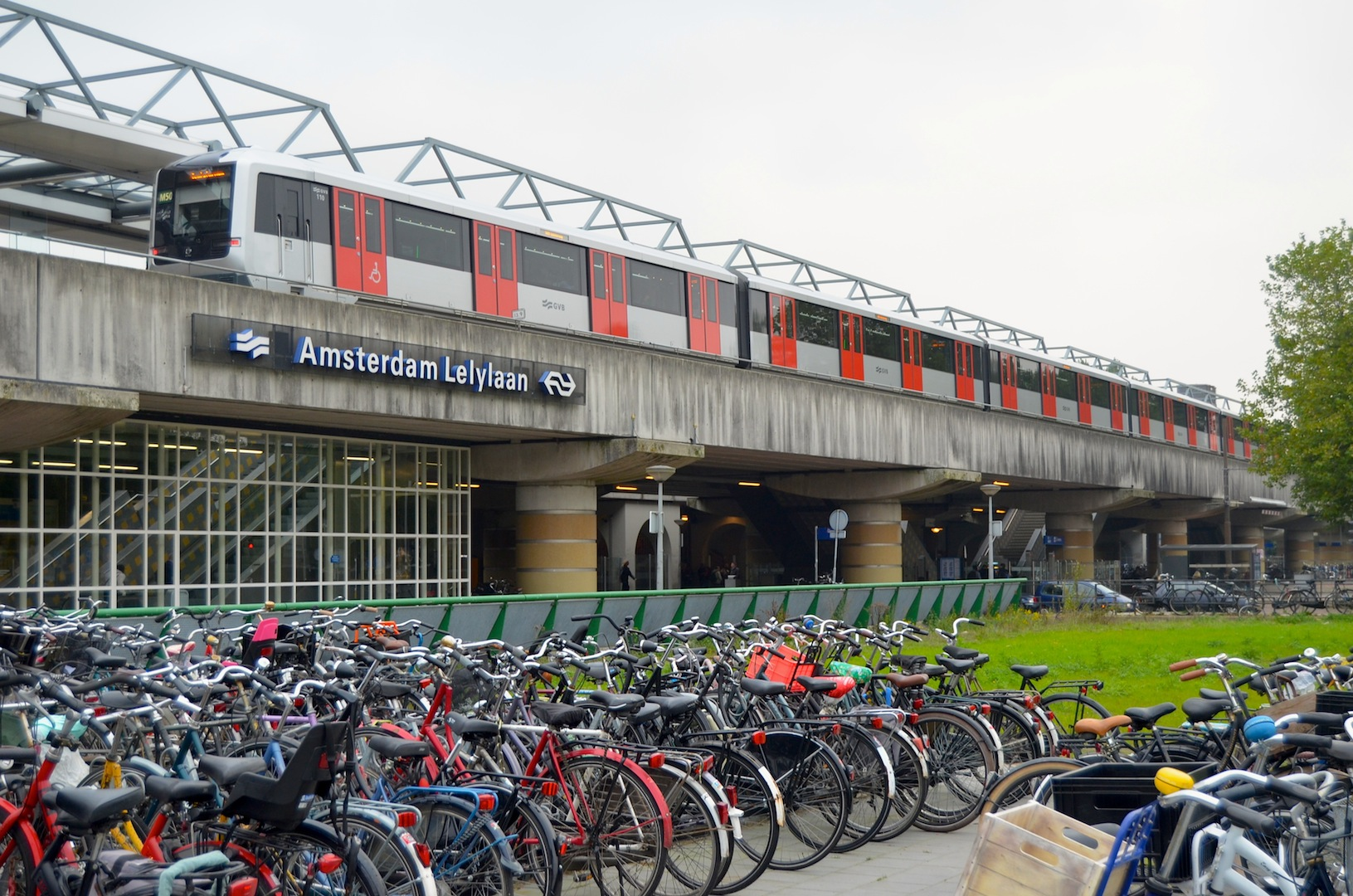
A M5 series EMU on the viaduct of Lelylaan station
