= Heemstedestraat metro station =

Metro station in Amsterdam

Heemstedestraat
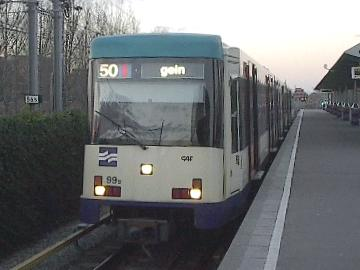

General information
- Location: Nieuw-West, Amsterdam; Netherlands
- Coordinates: 52°21′08″N 4°50′05″E
- Owner: GVB
- Platforms: 1 island platform
- Tracks: 2

Other information
- Station code: HDS

History
- Opened: 18 May 1997; 29 years ago

Services
Preceding station	Amsterdam Metro	Following station
Henk Sneevlietweg towards Gein	Line 50	Station Lelylaan towards Isolatorweg
Henk Sneevlietweg towards Centraal Station	Line 51	Station Lelylaan towards Isolatorweg
Location
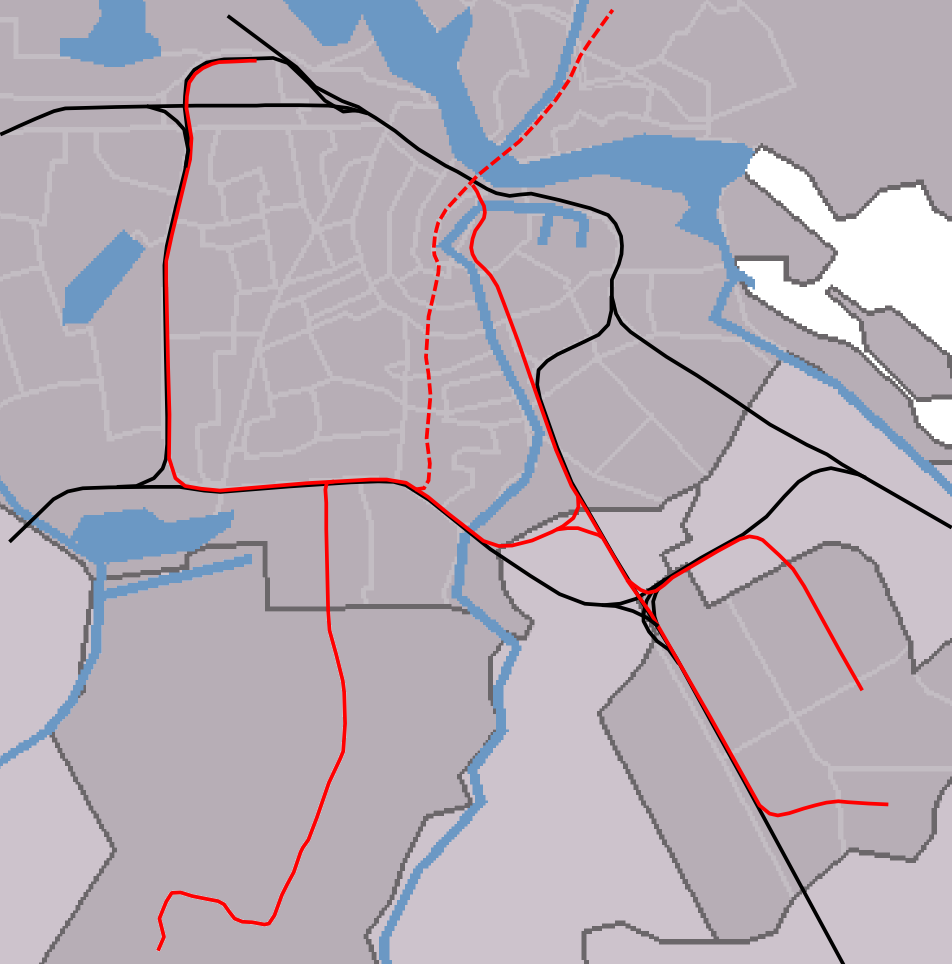
- Location within metro van Amsterdam

Heemstedestraat is an Amsterdam Metro station in the west of Amsterdam, Netherlands. The station opened in 1997 and is served by line 50 (Isolatorweg - Gein) and line 51 (Isolatorweg - Central Station).

The station lies in the south of the city and serves as the metro station for many offices, including the World Fashion Centre.

== Metro services ==
- 50 Isolatorweg - Sloterdijk - Lelylaan - Zuid - RAI - Duivendrecht - Bijlmer ArenA - Holendrecht - Gein
- 51 Isolatorweg - Sloterdijk - Lelylaan - Zuid - RAI - Amsterdam Amstel - Central Station

== Tram services ==
- 2 Centraal Station - Leidseplein - Museumplein - Willemsparkweg - Hoofddorpplein - Heemstedestraat - Sloten - Nieuw-Sloten

Amsterdam Metro network
