= Isolatorweg metro station =

Metro station in Amsterdam

Isolatorweg
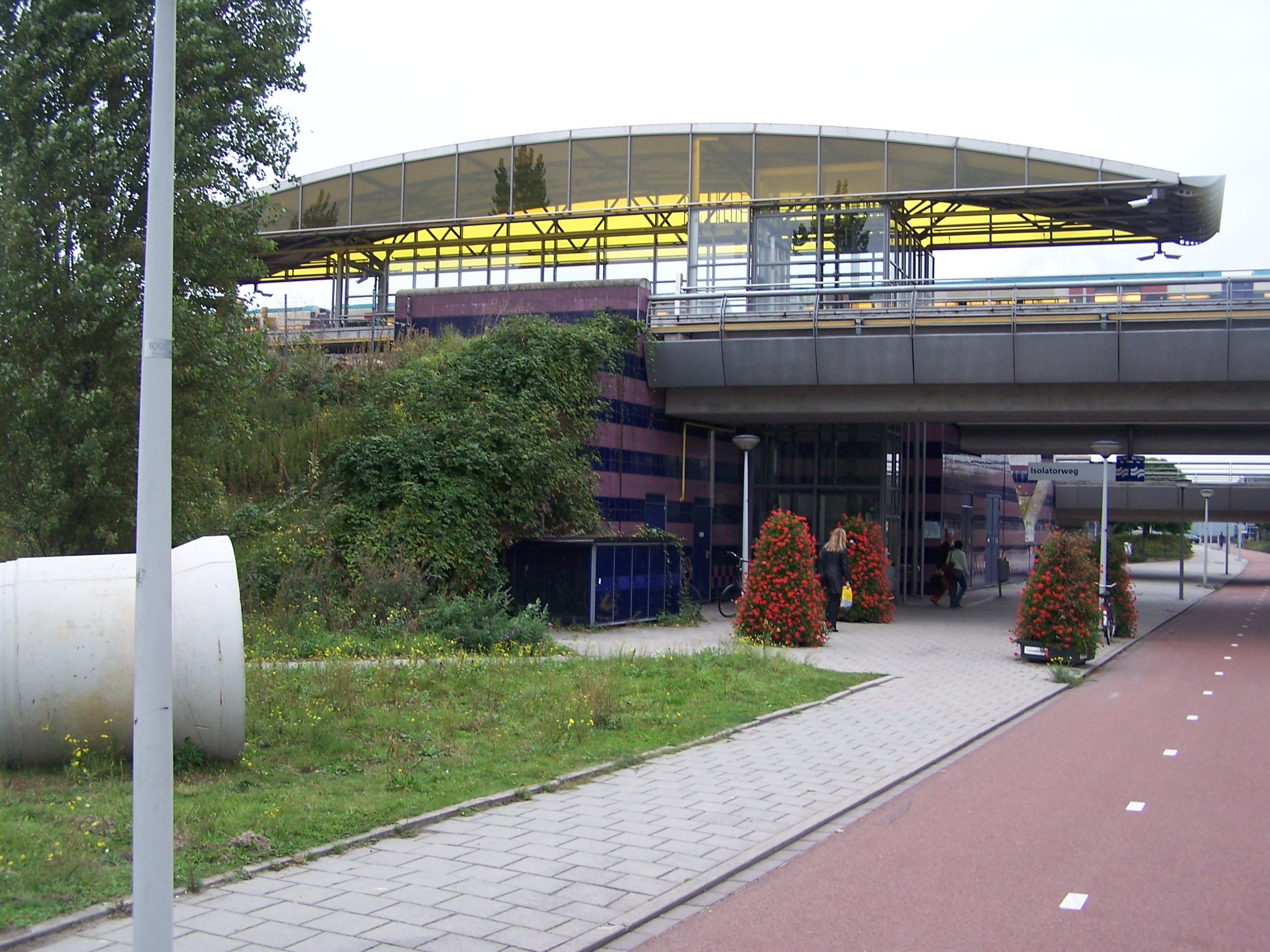

General information
- Location: Amsterdam; Netherlands
- Coordinates: 52°23′43″N 4°51′2″E
- System: Amsterdam Metro station
- Operator: GVB
- Line: 50, 51
- Platforms: 1 island platform
- Tracks: 2

Other information
- Station code: ITW

History
- Opened: 28 May 1997; 29 years ago

Services
Preceding station	Amsterdam Metro	Following station
Station Sloterdijk towards Gein	Line 50	Terminus
Station Sloterdijk towards Centraal Station	Line 51	Terminus
Location

Isolatorweg metro station is the terminus of the Amsterdam metro 50 (Ringlijn) and opened on 28 May 1997. From 3 March 2019 this is also the terminus of the Amsterdam metro 51. The station is a railway embankment near the Isolatorweg on an industrial estate close to an electric generating station in the western harbour area of Amsterdam. Since there are no nearby residential areas, the station attracts relatively few visitors. The station has an island platform in the middle of a central access. Isolatorweg is the third metro station in Amsterdam that does not have an escalator.

The station takes its name from the Isolatorweg street, which itself refers to the electrical isolator. Other street names in the area include Generatorstraat, Elektronstraat, and Magneetstraat.
