= Sixhaven metro station =

Metro station in Amsterdam, Netherlands

Sixhaven
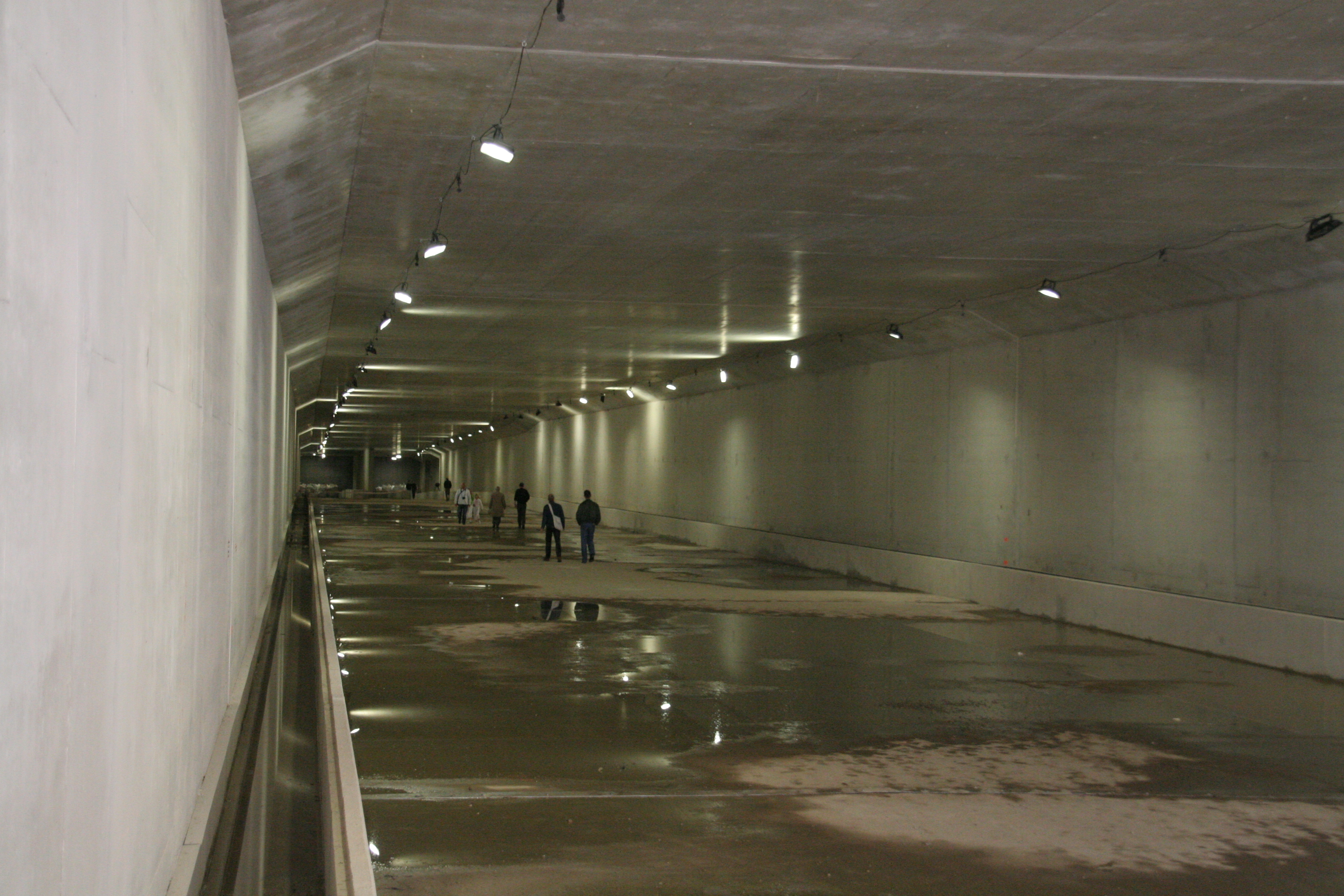
- The tunnel section under Sixhaven in 2009

General information
- Location: IJplein, Amsterdam, Netherlands
- Coordinates: 52°22′56″N 4°54′21″E
- Owner: Gemeente Vervoerbedrijf
- Line: 52 (Metro)

Other information
- Fare zone: 5711 (Noord)
Location

Sixhaven is a cancelled underground metro station in Amsterdam-Noord, Netherlands, located on the route of metro line 52 of the Amsterdam Metro. The station was postponed in 2003 due to high costs and low passenger expectancy. The section of the tunnel where the station was proposed was made larger to allow for the station to be constructed at a later date. Discussions of creating the station continued until 2021, when it was cancelled completely.

== Location and layout ==
The station is located under the Sixhaven harbour, between Amsterdam Centraal and Noorderpark metro station. From Sixhaven to Noorderpark is over 1 kilometre (0.62 mi). At the proposed location of the station, the tunnel is located only 10 metres (33 ft) under the street level, is wider and has a 50-centimetre (20 in) higher ceiling. In the absence of the station, this extra space is used for a third track, allowing the metro units to turn around without going to Noord metro station if necessary. If the station was decided to be constructed, a "narrow but long" island platform of 5.76 metres (18.9 ft) could replace the reserve track. A branch to Zaandam of the metro was also taken into account when constructing the tunnel. A new tunnel would be built under the existing one, giving Sixhaven station a total of 4 tracks.

== History ==
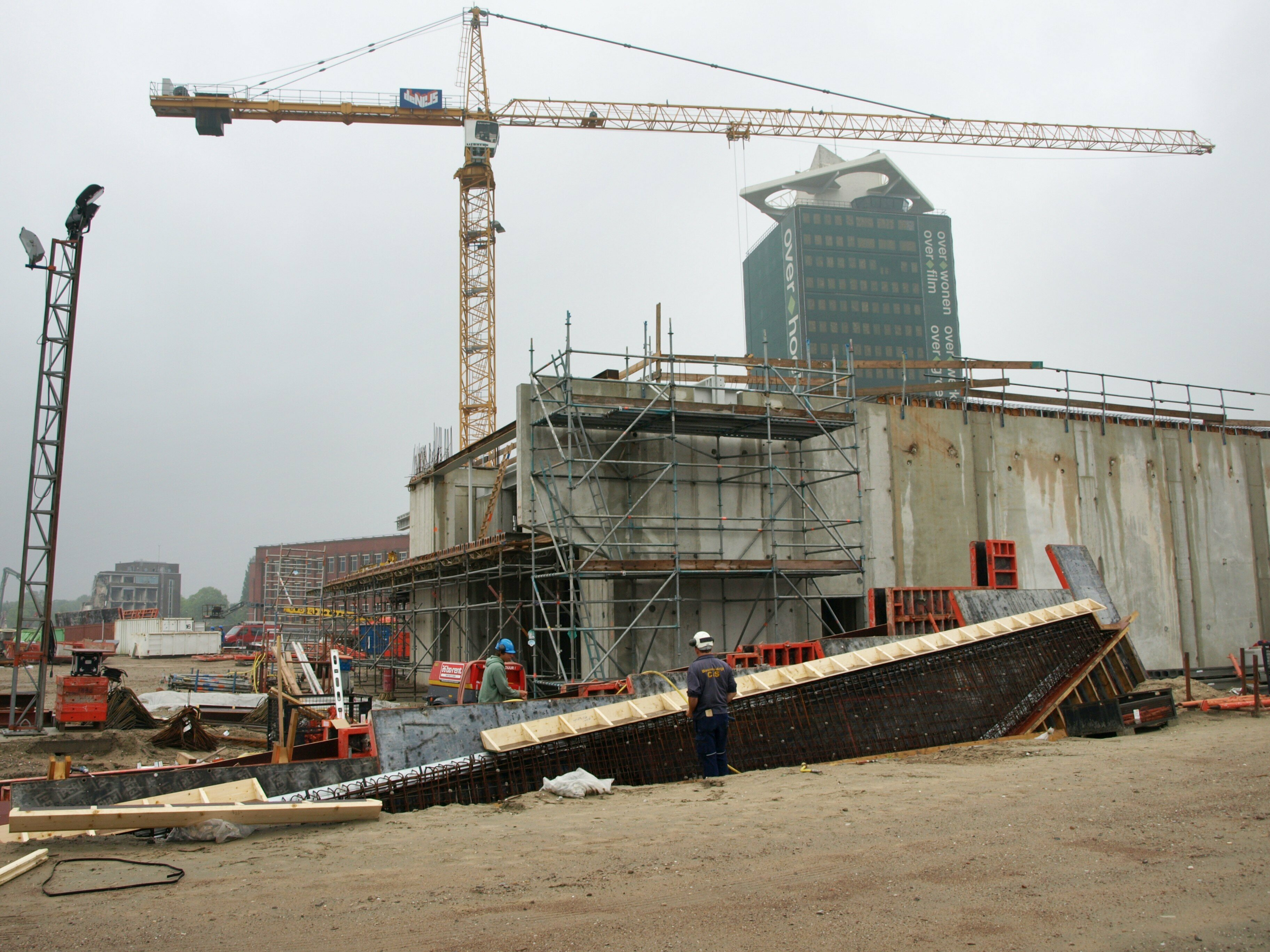
Construction of the tunnel section at Sixhaven in 2010

The station was not featured in the 1968 metro plan released by the information office of the municipality. In a 1995 article of de Volkskrant, Sixhaven was shown on a map as a possible station. The station was removed from the plan in October 2003, due to the little number of expected passengers as well as a doubling in the expected costs to €30 million.

A 2009 investigation concluded that a stations with 4 tracks was still possible. In 2015 however, it was concluded that the development of Sixhaven and nearby Overhoeks was too unpredictable to allow the creation of a transportation model for the area. Alderman Pieter Litjens said that a station could still be constructed if it was necessary in the long term. It was reported in 2017 that the station could be constructed while the line was already running with minimal disruption of the metro traffic, but that the municipality would re-evaluate the station in 2020.

The station was cancelled indefinitely in January 2021, following reports estimating that it would cost €150 million, compared to only €45 million in 2017. The station would've allowed for the line to run at a higher frequency. Locals complained that no alternative transportation method was provided to replace the station.

== Services ==
The station was due to be served by metro 52, also known as the North–South line (Dutch: Noord/Zuidlijn). The line only passes through the location without stopping. The station is located near the IJplein ferry stop, allowing transfers to ferry F2.

Preceding station	Amsterdam Metro	Following station
Noorderpark towards Noord	Line 52	Centraal Station towards Station Zuid
