= Europaplein metro station =

Station on the North–South Line of the Amsterdam Metro

Europaplein
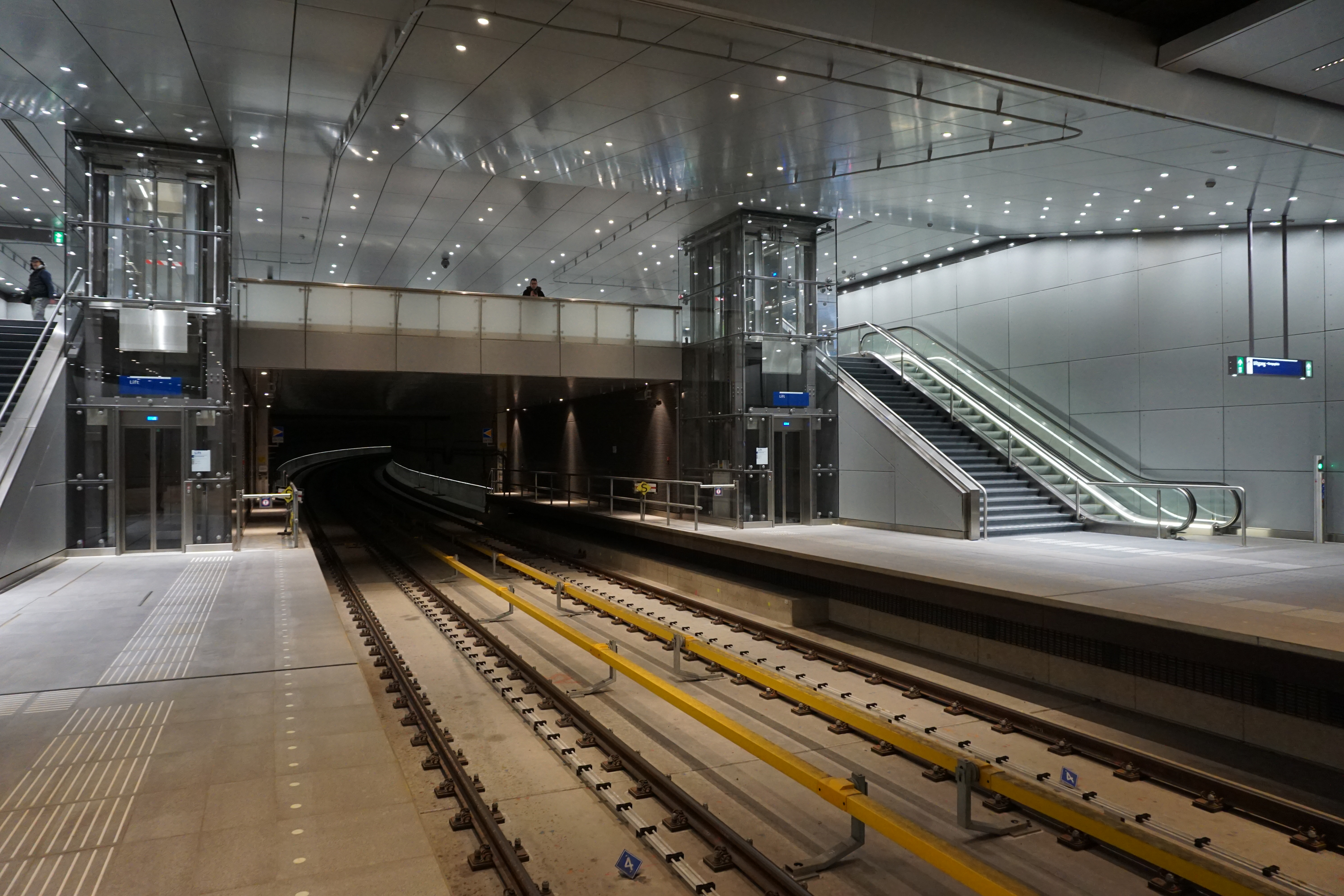
- Europaplein metro station as of 20 January 2018

General information
- Location: Zuidas, Amsterdam, Netherlands
- Coordinates: 52°20′30″N 4°53′33″E
- Owner: City of Amsterdam
- Operator: GVB
- Line: 52 (Metro)
- Platforms: 2 side platforms
- Tracks: 2

Construction
- Structure type: Underground
- Platform levels: 1

Other information
- Station code: EPN
- Fare zone: 5714 (Amsterdam Zuid)

History
- Opened: 22 July 2018

Services
Preceding station	Amsterdam Metro	Following station
De Pijp towards Noord	Line 52	Station Zuid Terminus
Preceding station	Amsterdam Tram	Following station
Dintelstraat towards Centraal Station	Line 4	Station RAI towards Drentepark
Location
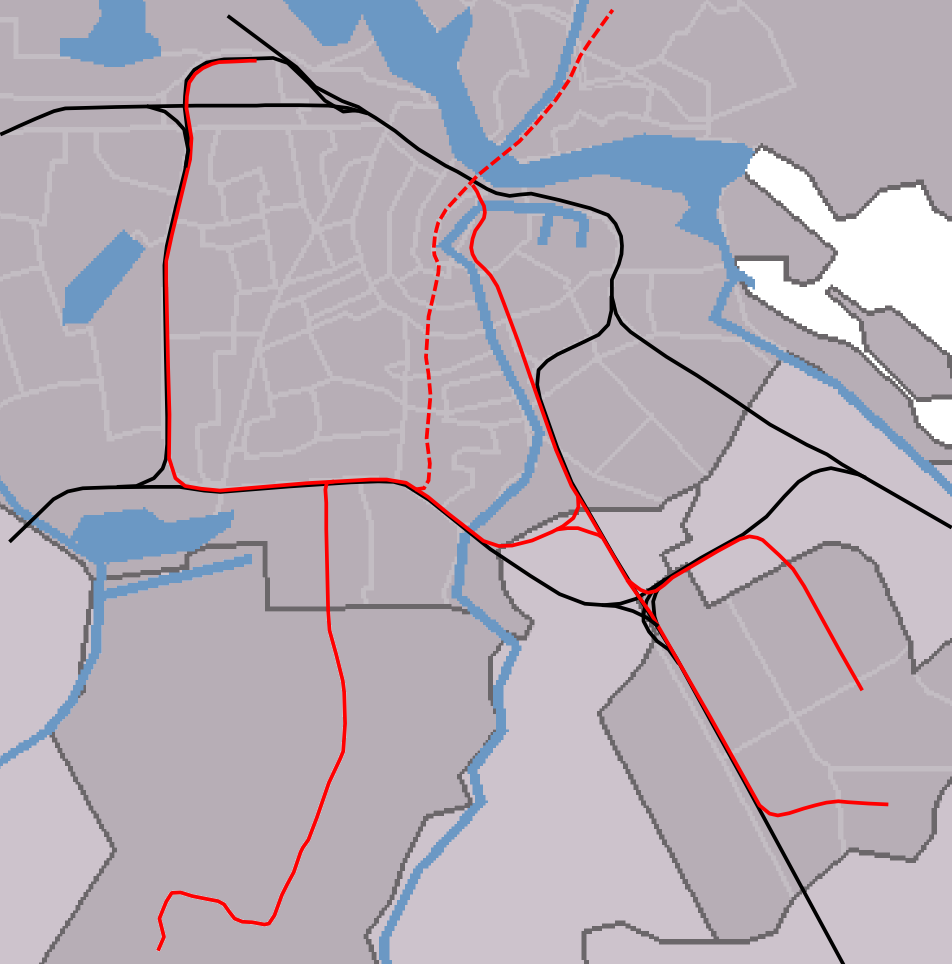
- Location within metro van Amsterdam

Europaplein metro station (Dutch: Station Europaplein) is a station on the Route 52 (North–South Line) of the Amsterdam Metro in Amsterdam, Netherlands. It was opened on 22 July 2018. Europaplein is an underground station situated in the Zuidas neighbourhood of Amsterdam-Zuid (Amsterdam South). The station is expected to handle around 20,000 passengers and arrivals per day.

== History ==
The station, designed by Benthem Crouwel Architects, is situated beneath the Europaplein in the Zuidas neighbourhood in front of the main entrance of the Amsterdam RAI Exhibition and Convention Centre. The station has two side platforms of 130 meters long and approximately 4.5 meters wide at its narrowest point, which widens to 8 meters at each platform end where the entrances are located. The station was the only one on the Noord/Zuid line built using cut-and-cover methods. At 8 meters below sea level, the platforms can be accessed by fixed staircases (in addition to up-only escalators, as well as lifts).

The station has two entrances both in front of the convention centre, the northern entrance in front of the Europe Complex, and the southern entrance in front of the Holland Complex. The station is within walking distance of the Amsterdam RAI railway station which lies to the south.

The artwork at platform level is a photo collage by artist Gerald van der Kaap. The collages span the length of the station and are featured on both platforms. The municipal government selected his work by special committee in May 2013.

== Gallery ==
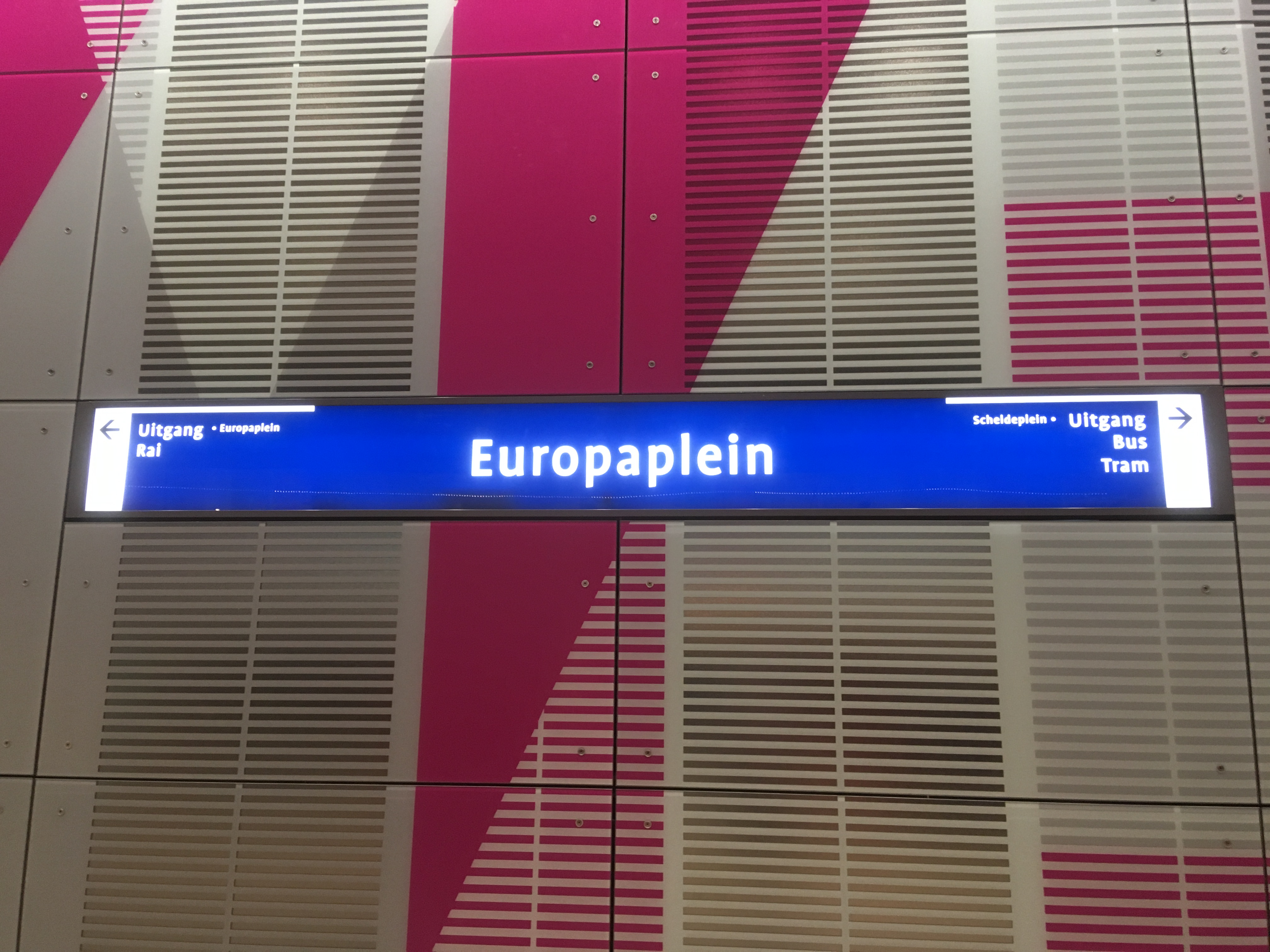
Europaplein station sign, Noord-Zuid Line

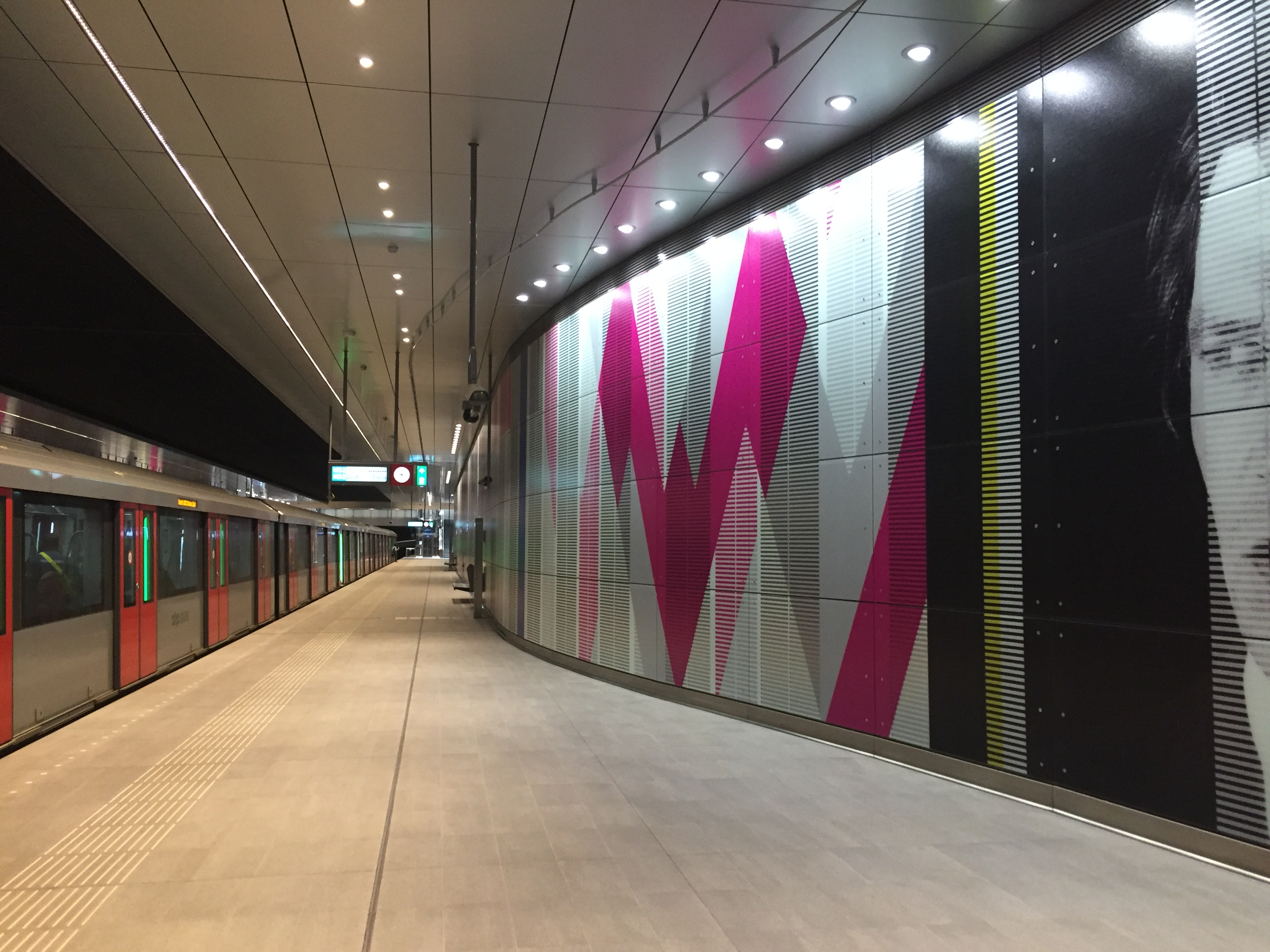
Europaplein station during an open house, May 2018.

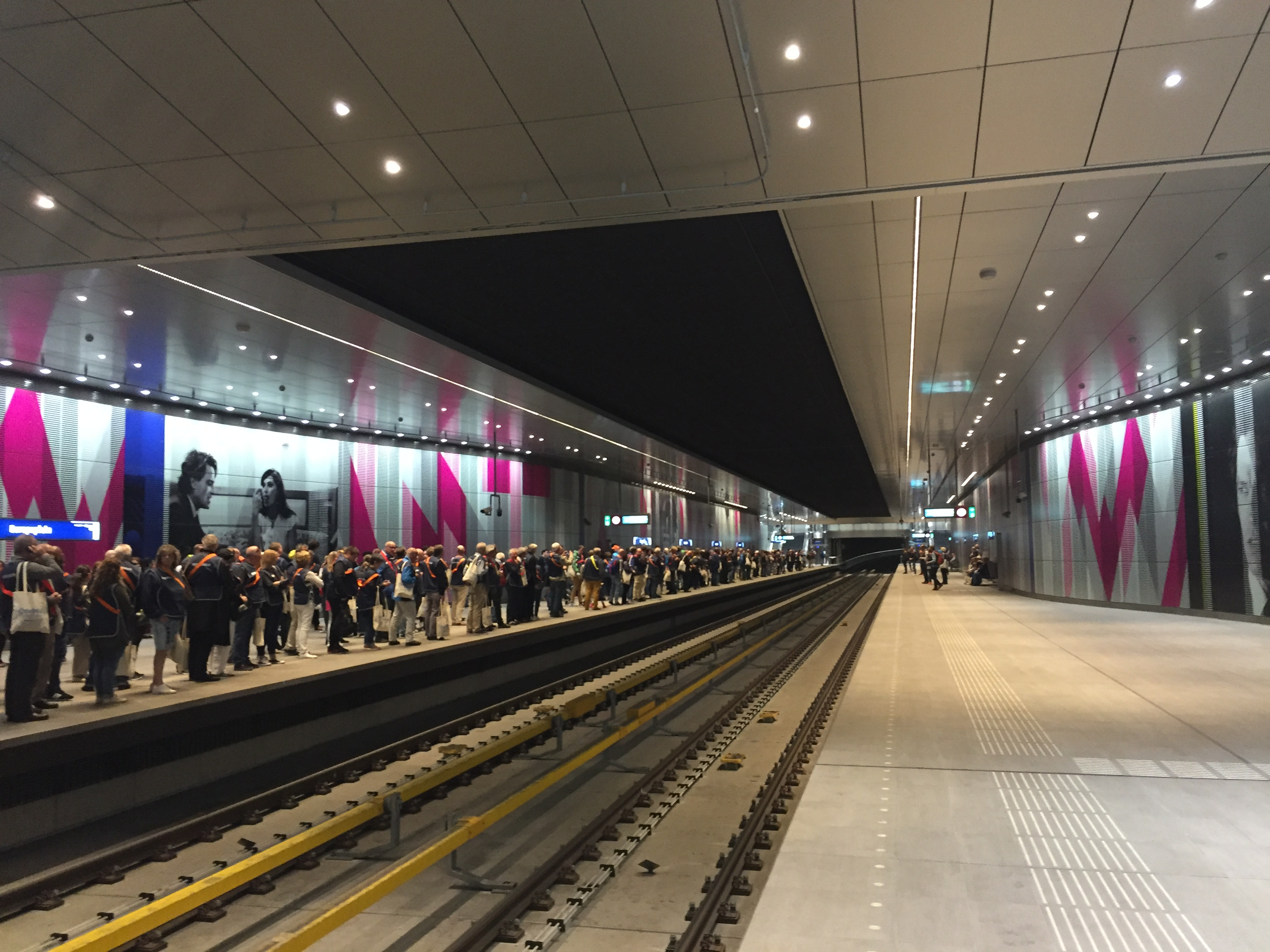
Europaplein station during an open house, May 2018.

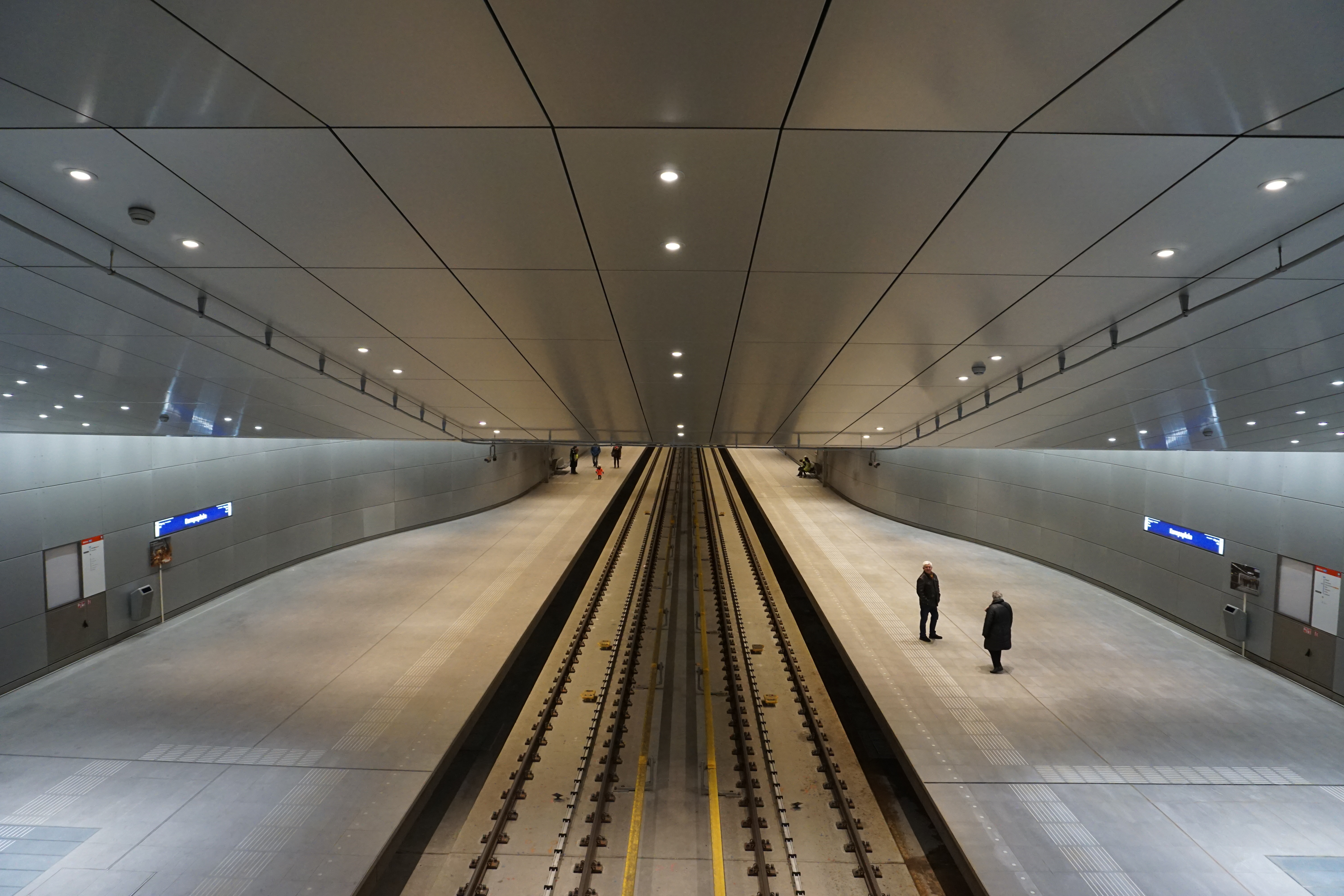
Platforms looking southward, January 2018.

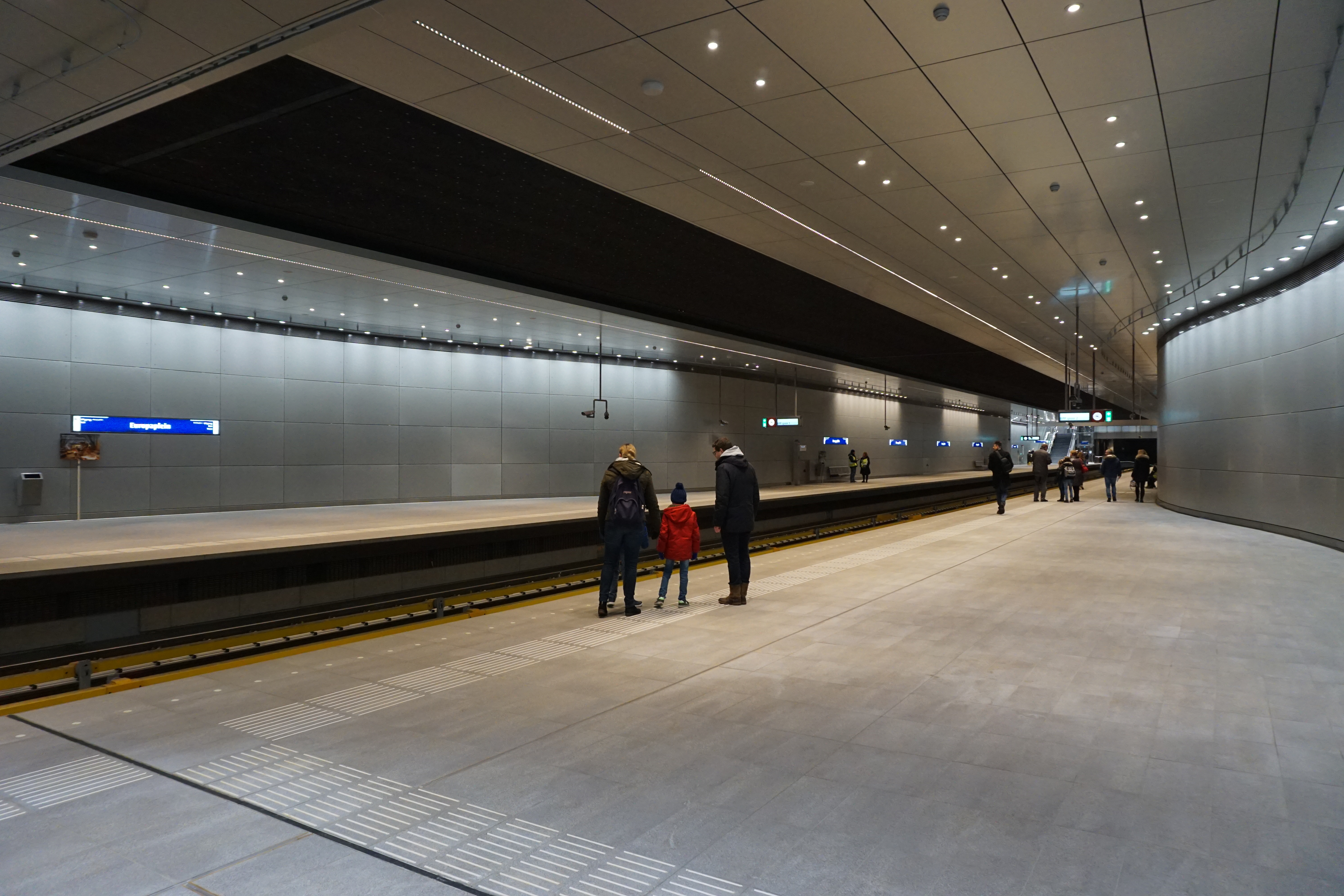
Northbound platform, January 2018.

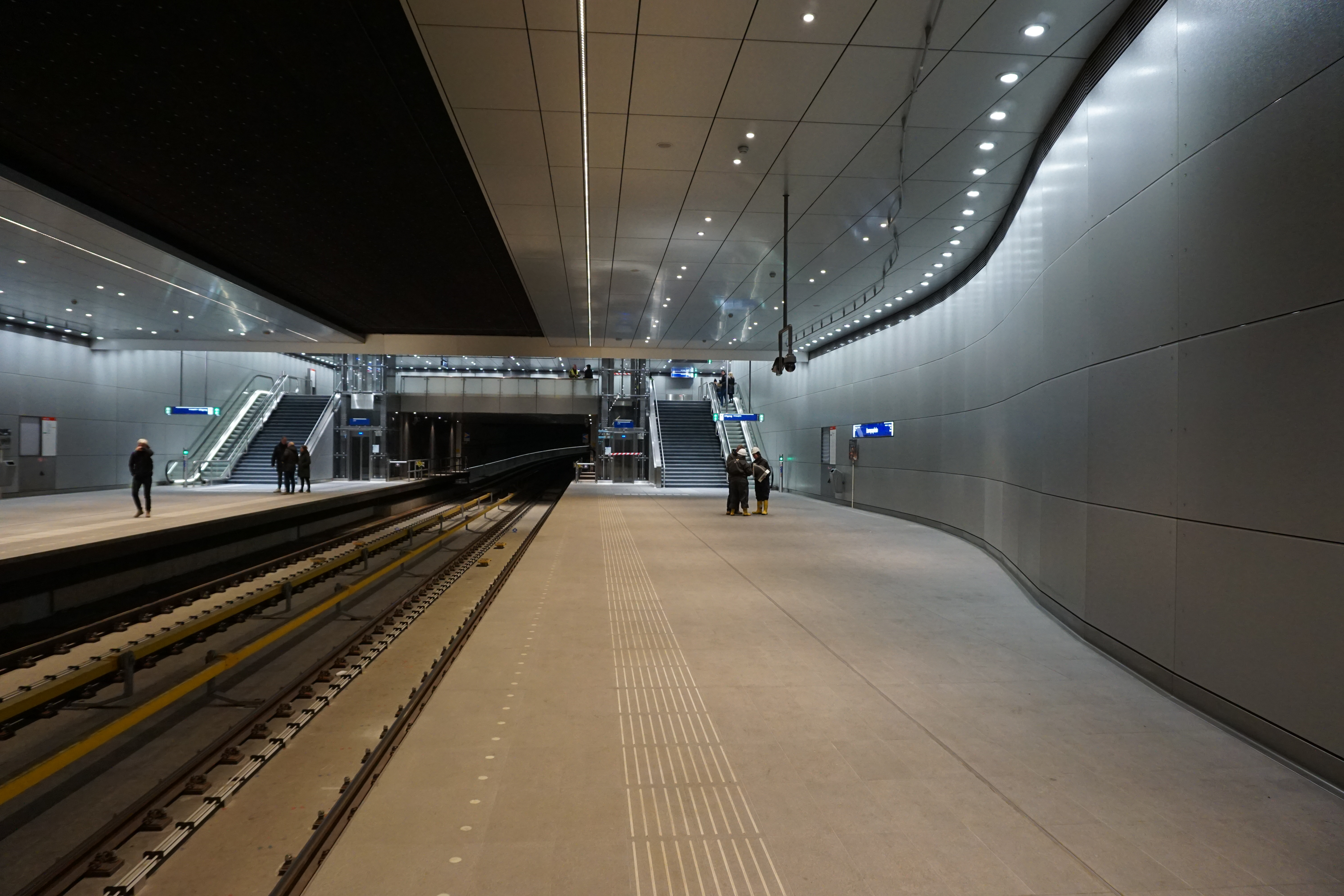
Northbound platform, January 2018.

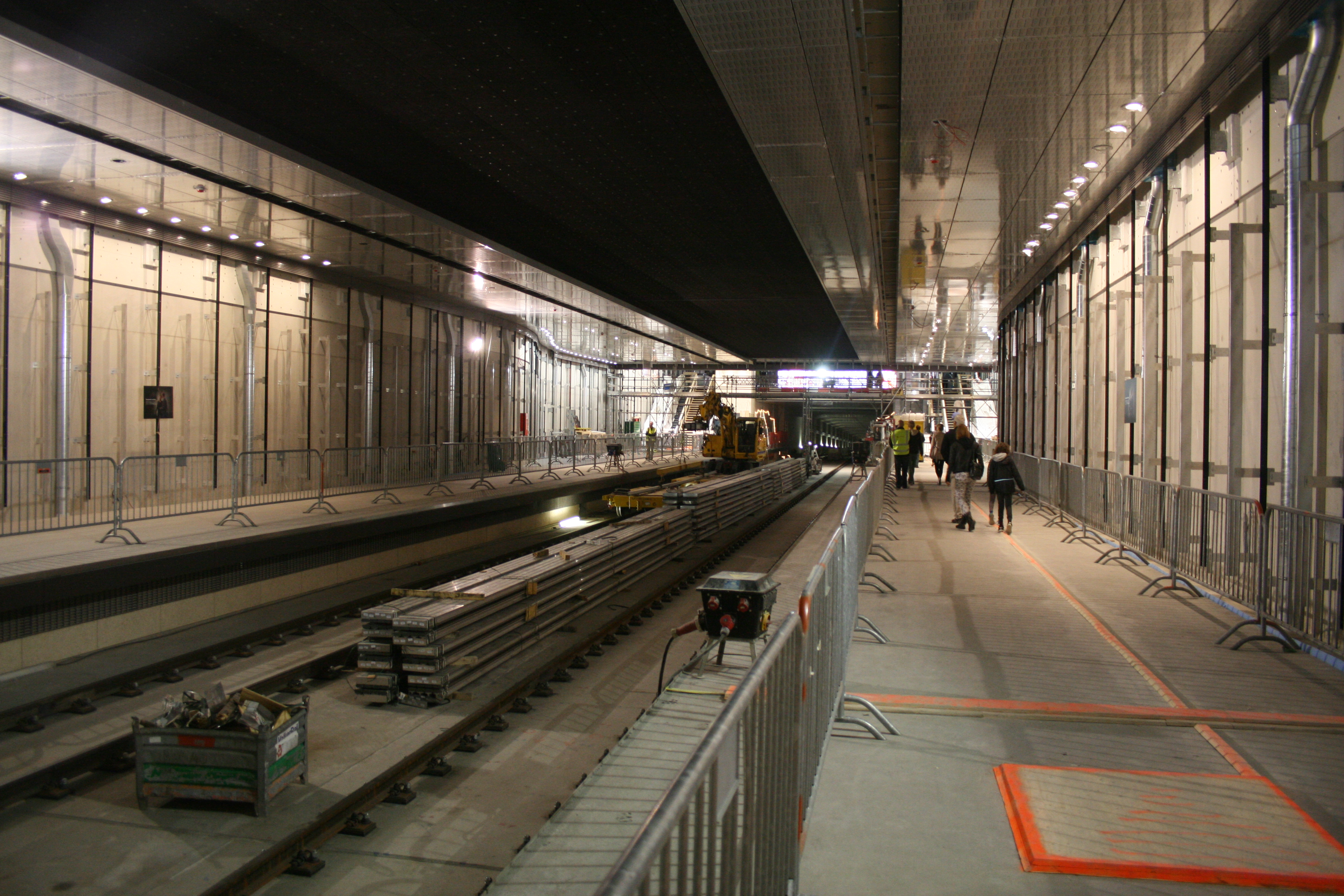
Northbound platform, January 2018.

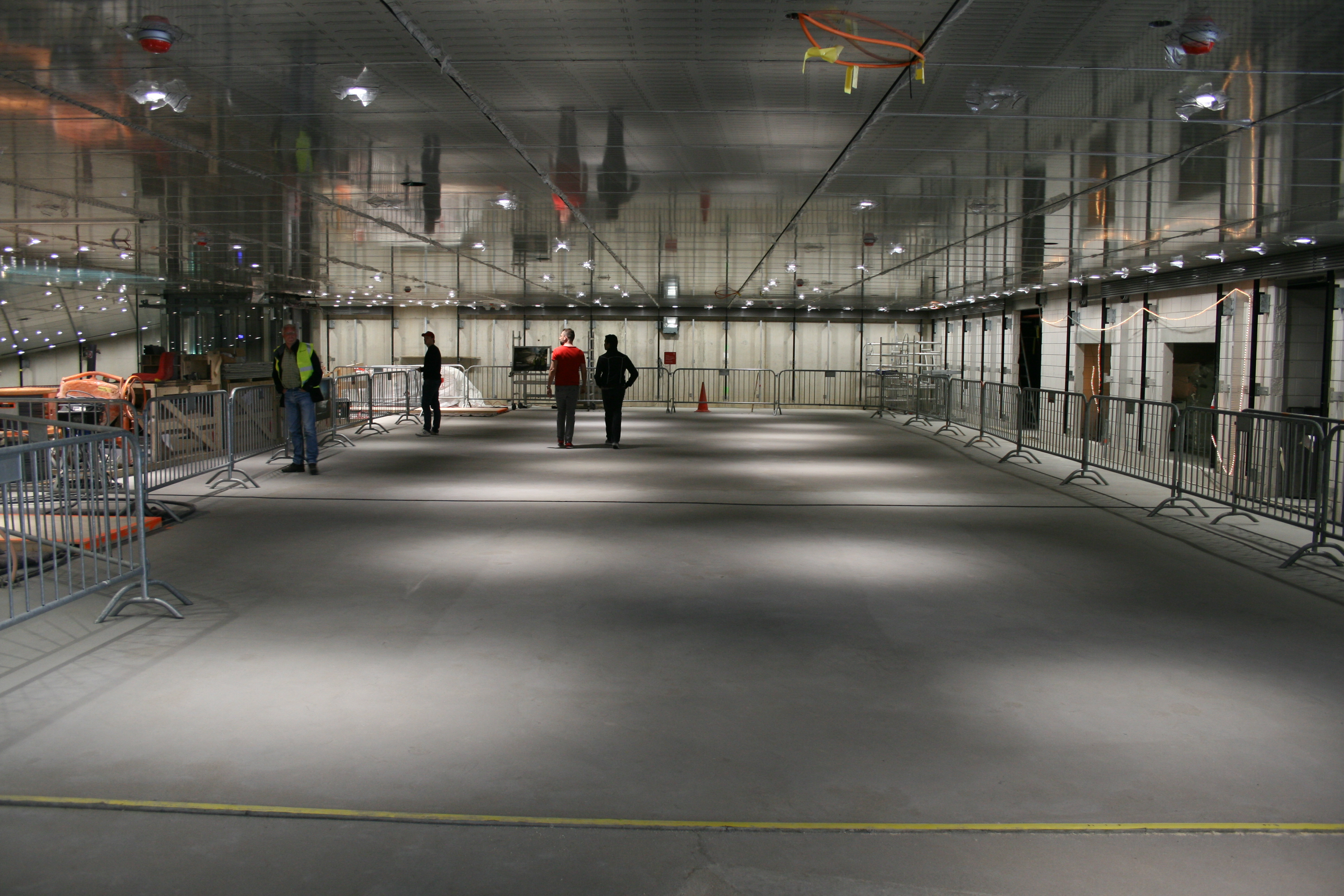
Southern ticket hall nearing completion phase, June 2015.

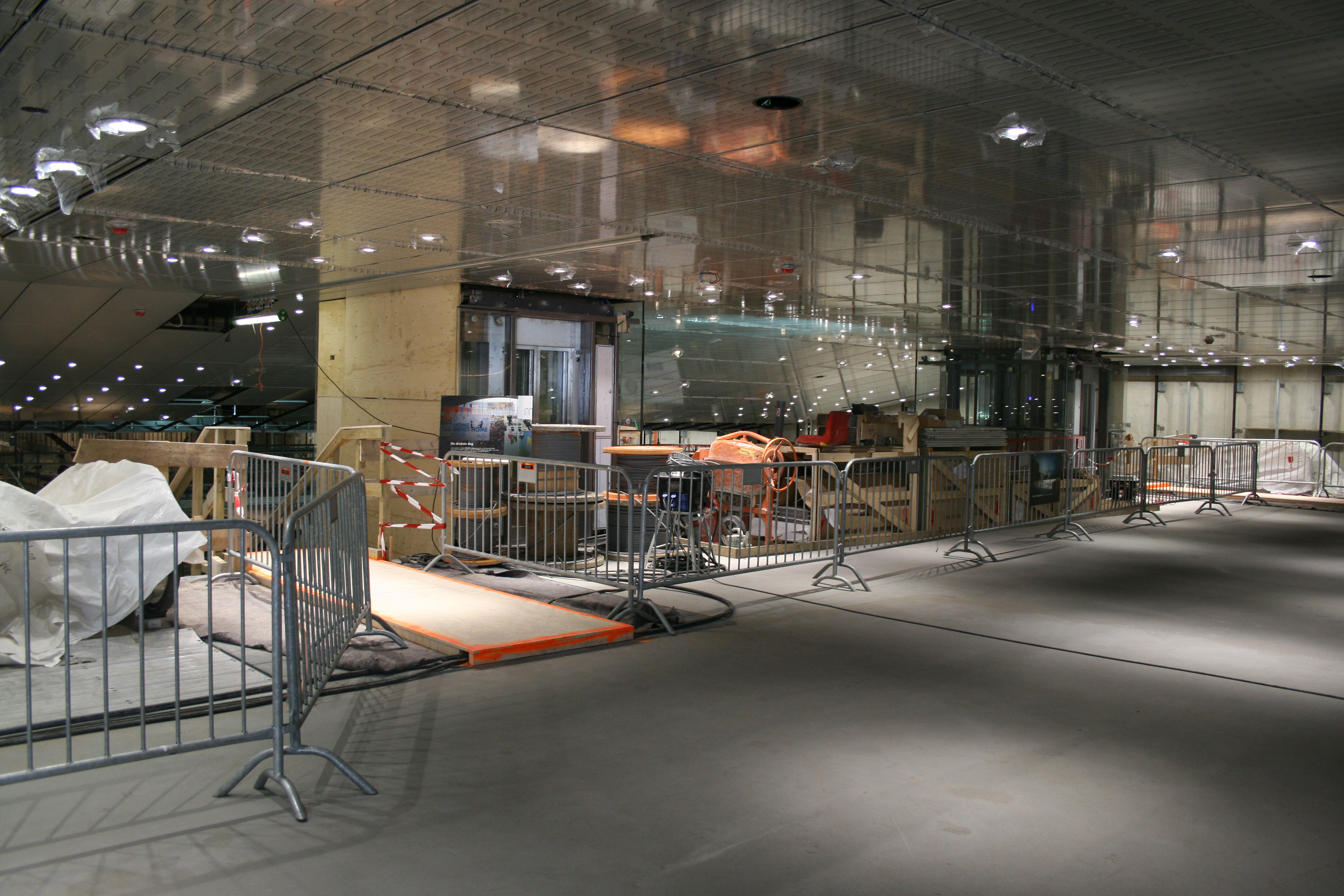
Southern ticket hall looking near the lifts and stairways toward the platforms, June 2015

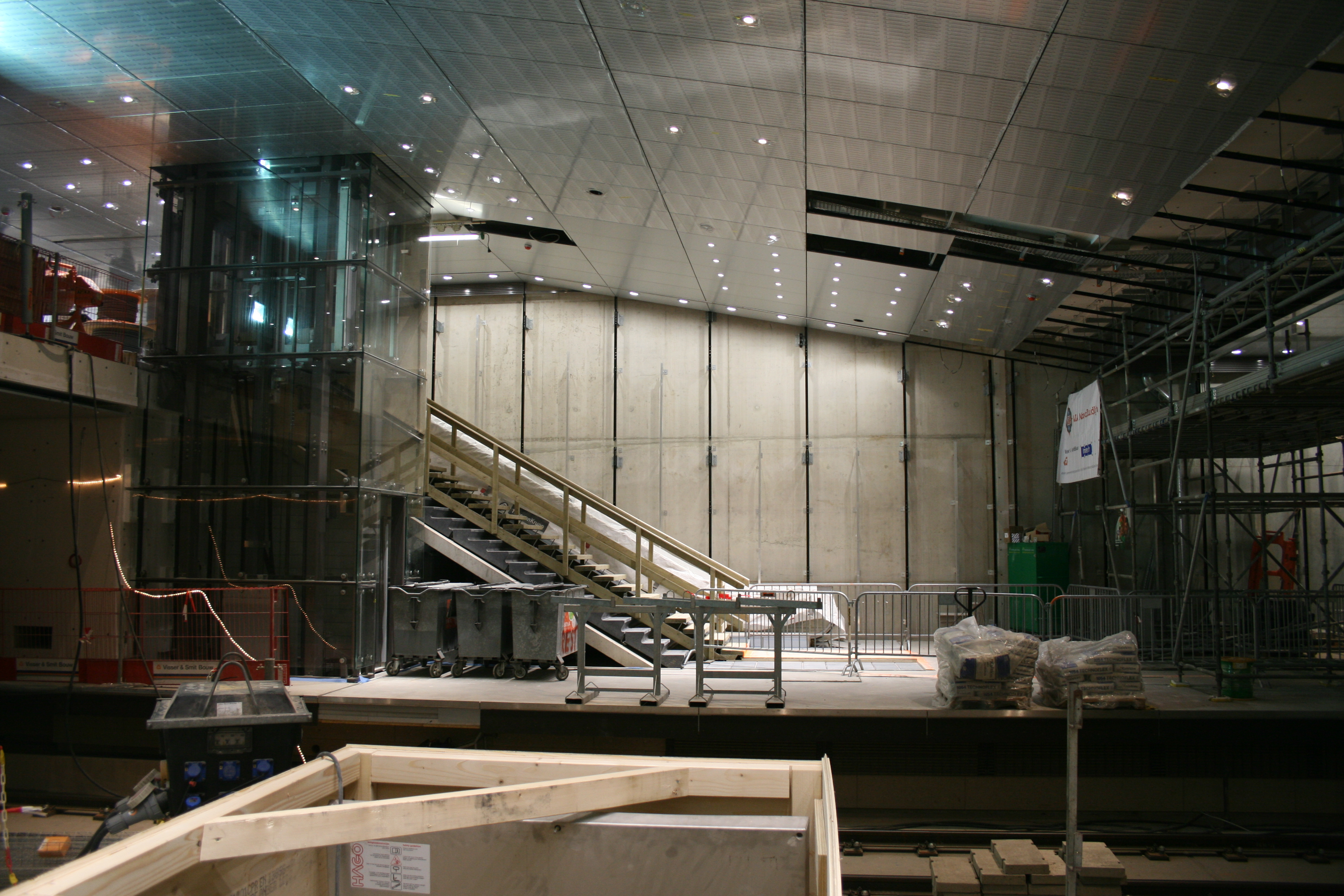
Southern end of platforms showing lifts and stairways to ticket hall, June 2015.

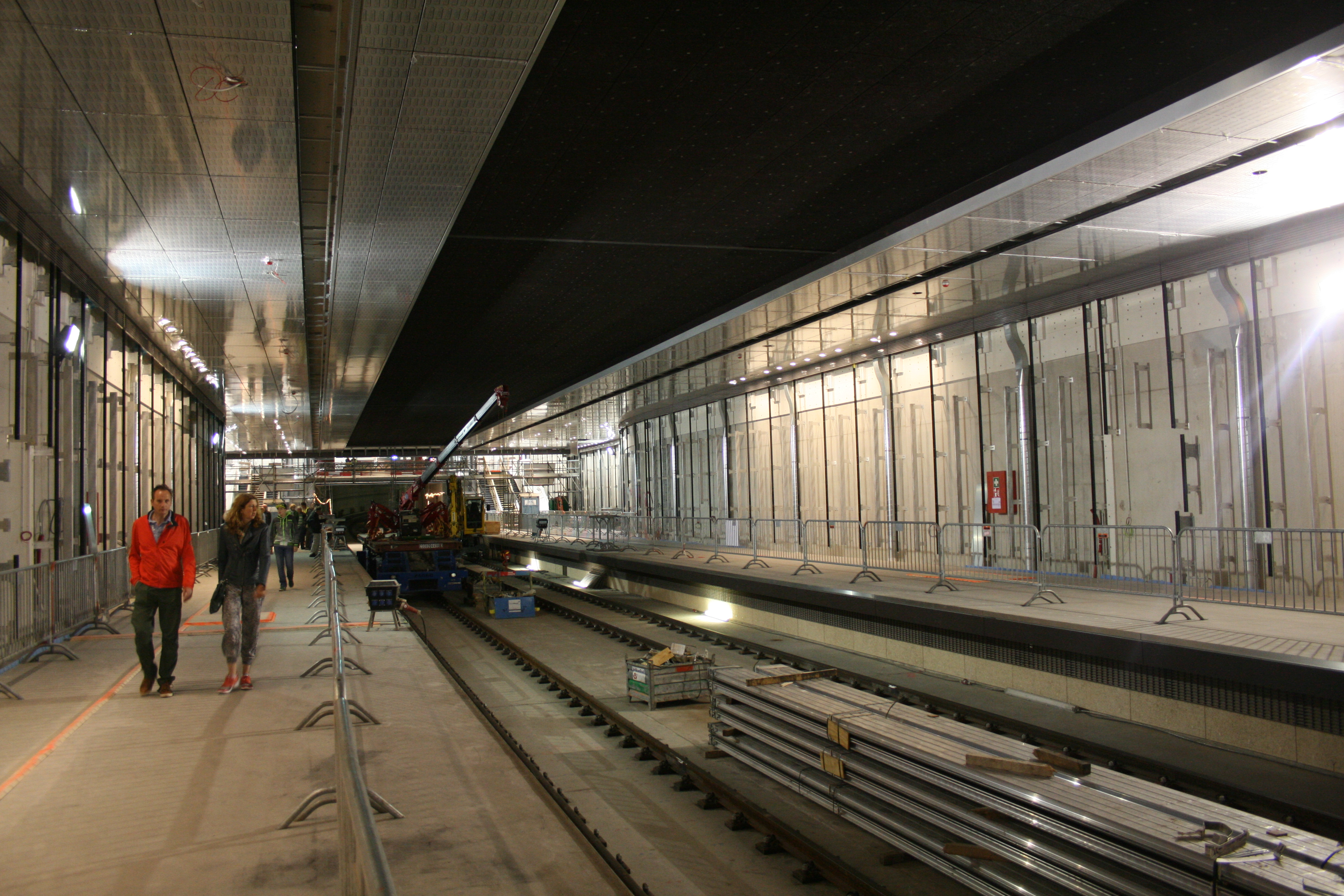
Side platforms looking southward nearing completion, June 2015.

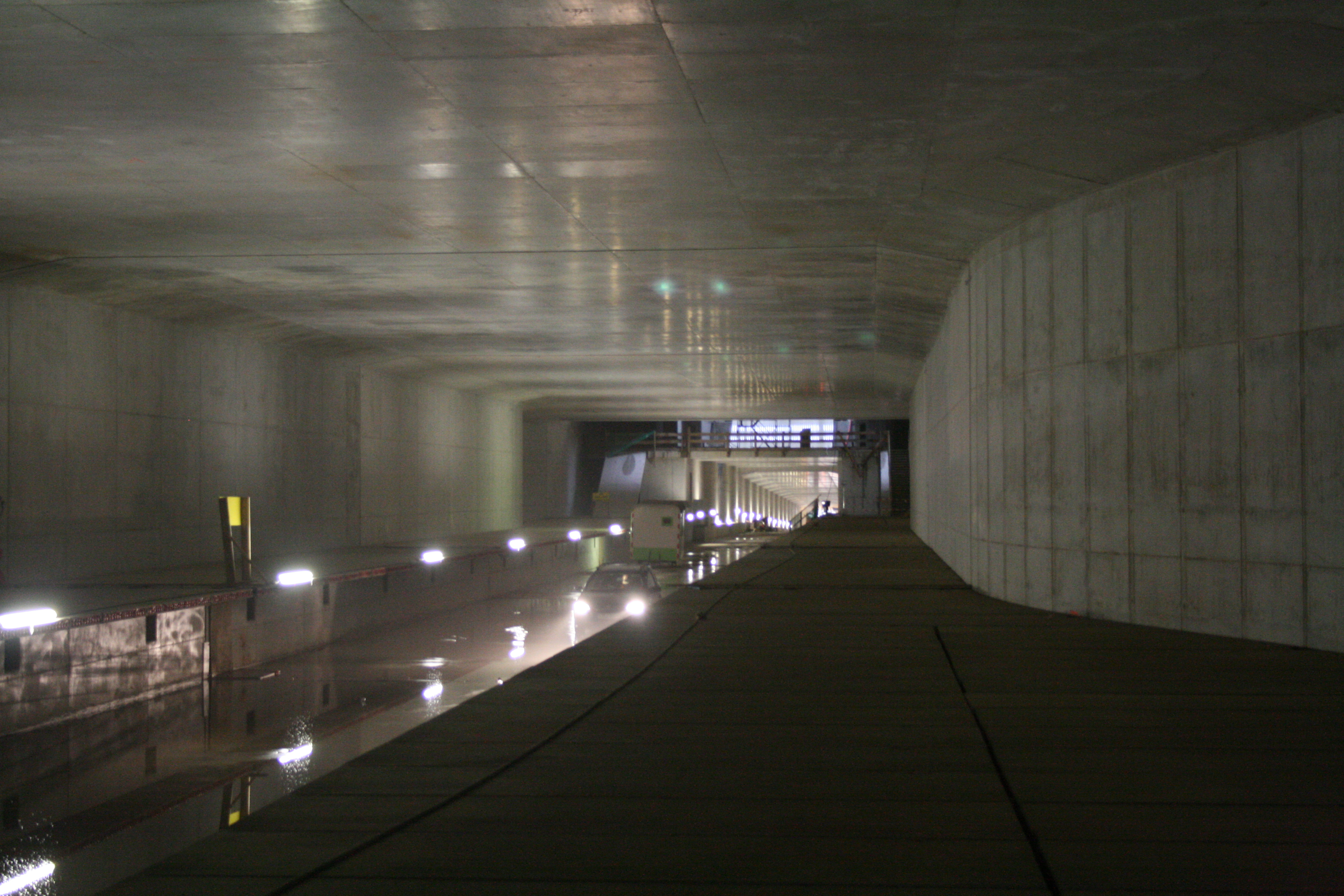
Europaplein station box, February 2011.

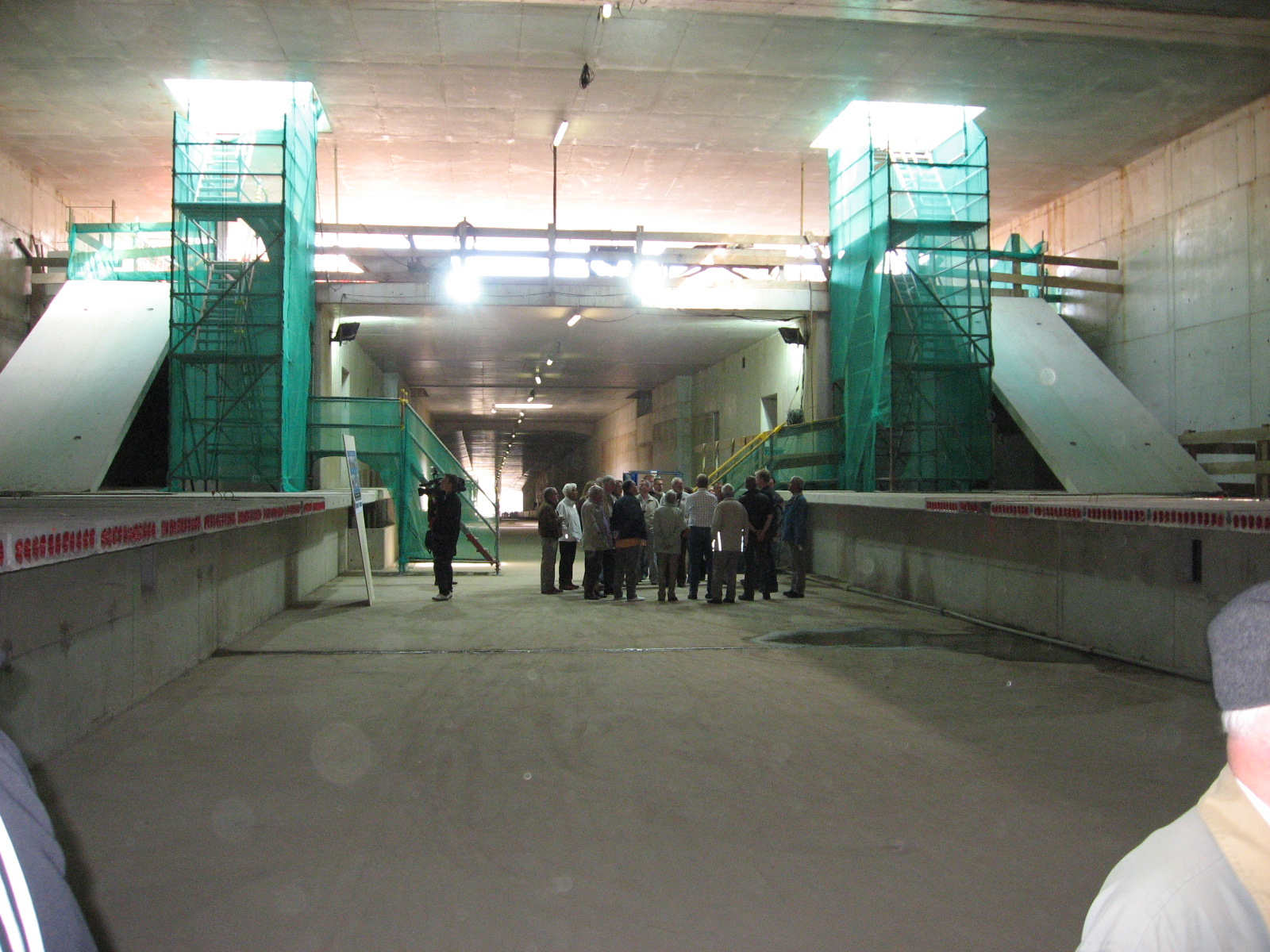
Europaplein station box, June 2009.
