= Line 52 (Amsterdam Metro) =

Metro line of Amsterdam, Netherlands

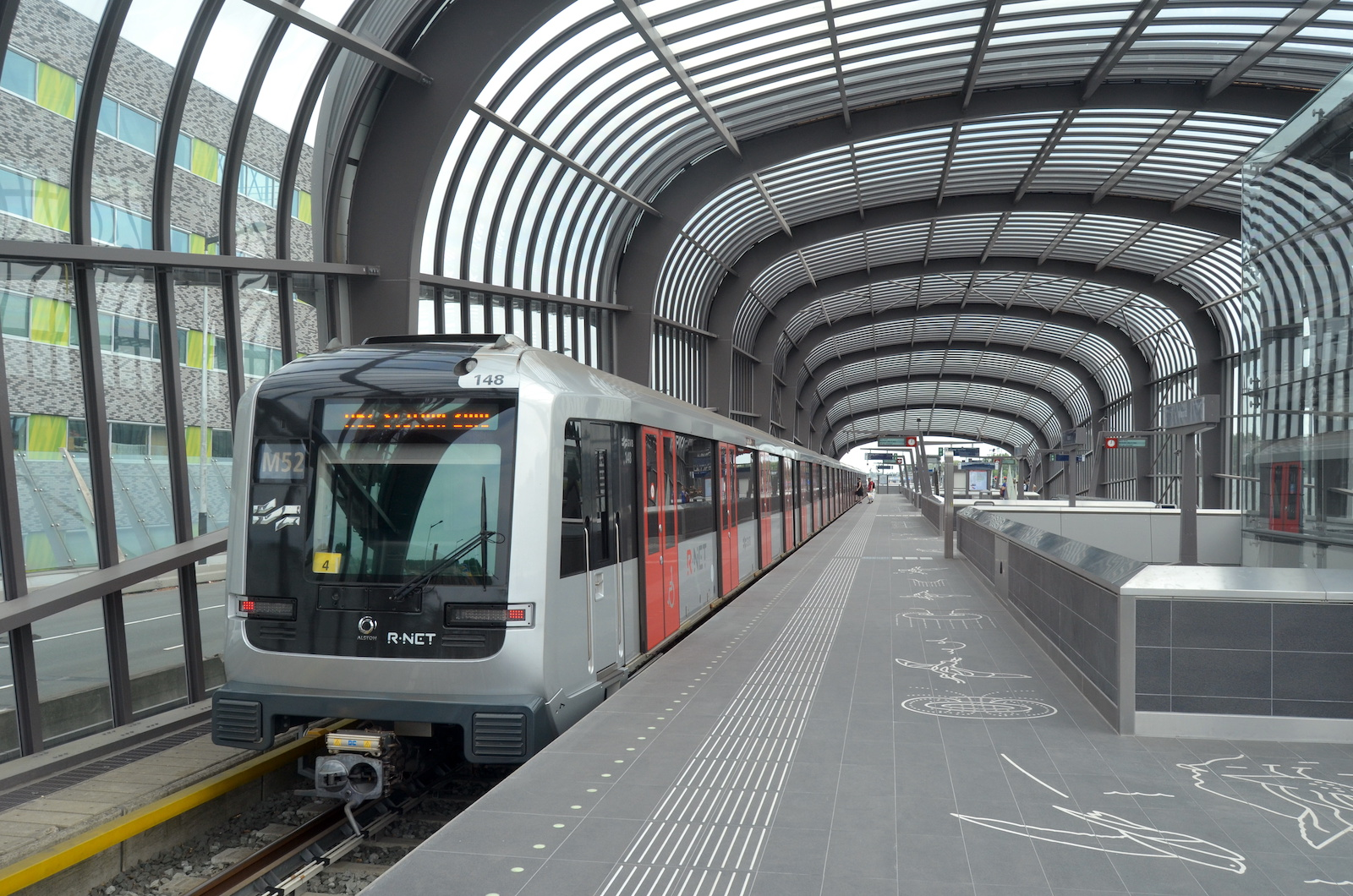
- A M5 series train at Noord station on the first day of operation; 22 July 2018. Photo: Erik Swierstra.

Overview
- Native name: Metrolijn 52 / Noord/Zuidlijn
- Owner: Amsterdam Metro
- Locale: Amsterdam
- Termini: Noord; Zuid
- Stations: 8
- Color on map: Blue

Service
- Type: Rapid transit
- Operator(s): GVB
- Rolling stock: M5
- Daily ridership: 84,000 (2019)

History
- Opened: 22 July 2018; 7 years ago

Technical
- Line length: 9.7 km (6.0 mi)
- Number of tracks: Double-track
- Track gauge: 1,435 mm (4 ft 8 1/2 in) standard gauge
- Electrification: Third rail, 750 V DC
- Operating speed: 70 km/h (43 mph)
Route map

Metro Line 52 (Dutch: Metrolijn 52), also known as the North–South Line (Noord/Zuidlijn), is part of the Amsterdam Metro network. The line starts in Amsterdam-Noord (Noord station next to the Buikslotermeerplein), continues under Amsterdam-Centrum to its terminus in Amsterdam Zuid station. It has six intermediate stops: Noorderpark, Centraal Station, Rokin, Vijzelgracht, De Pijp, and Europaplein.

The line was officially opened on 21 July 2018 by the mayor of Amsterdam, Femke Halsema and was opened to the public on the next day, 22 July 2018.

This was not the first line 52 in Amsterdam. During May 2008 and July 2013, part of line 50 was run as line 52 due to work in the Station Zuid area.

== Characteristics ==
=== Route ===
The line is 9.7 km long, of these 7.1 km are underground. The end to end travel time is 15 minutes, and from the Centraal Station to the north terminus 4 minutes and 11 minutes to the south terminus. The line starts above ground in Amsterdam-Noord and passes under the IJ and the Centraal Station. The route continues through a bored tunnel under the Damrak, The Dam, Rokin, Vijzelstraat, Vijzelgracht, Ferdinand Bolstraat and the Scheldestraat. From the Europaplein, the line was constructed using the cut and cover method. The line continues underground past the RAI until coming above ground in the central reservation of the South Ring Road (A10) just before the southerner terminus.

There were plans to combine line 52 and the Amsteltram under line 58, but these were abandoned in 2011.

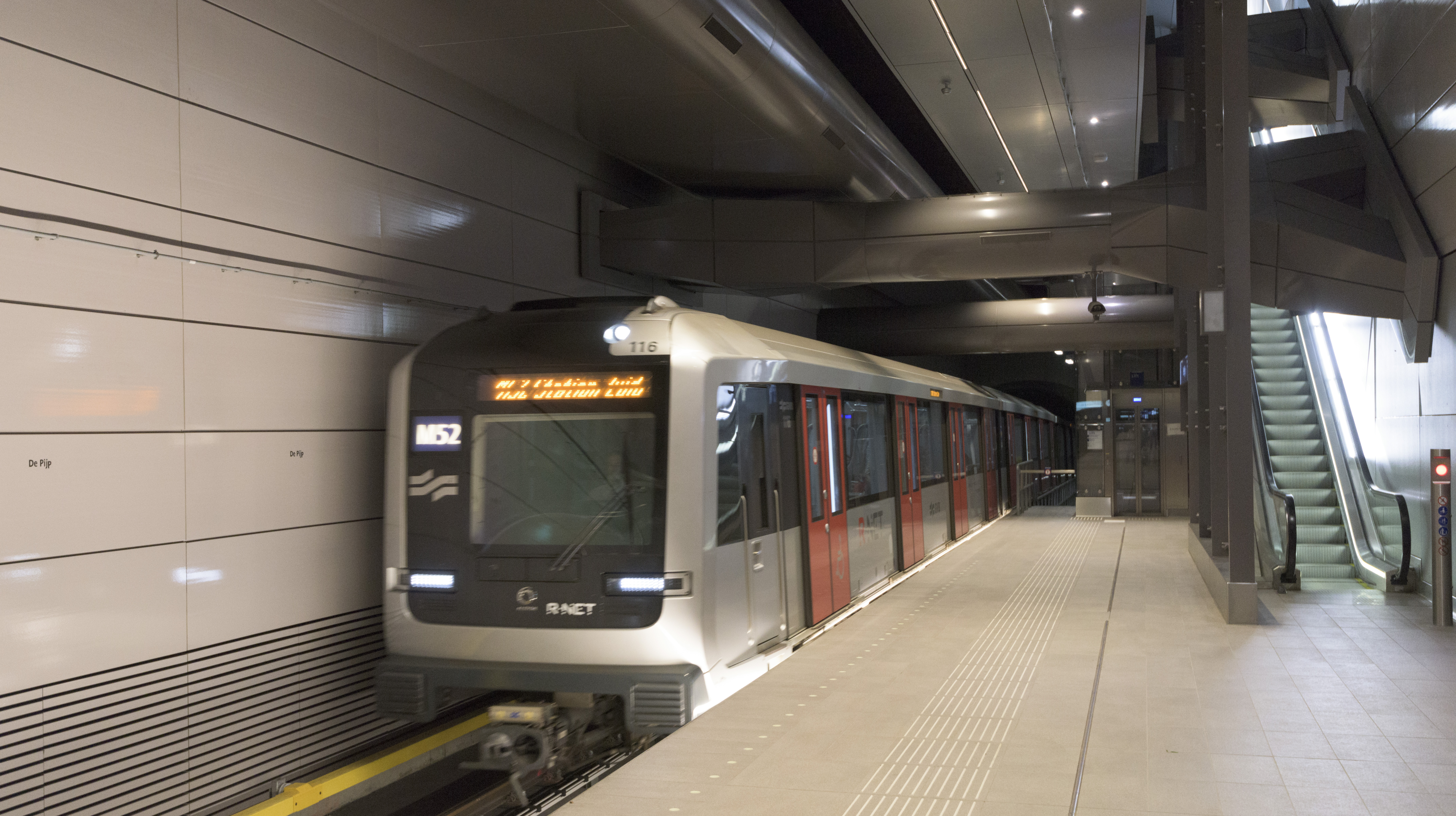
Metro on the North–South line in De Pijp station

=== Technology ===
The total length of the bored tunnels is 3.1 km, not including the stations it passes through. The route was chosen so that the TBM would largely follow the street pattern and drill as little as possible directly under buildings. The line uses third rail power, just as the rest of the metro network.

The energy supply, security and other infrastructure of the North South line are controlled from the Sein-Energie en Telecomgebouw (Signal, Energy and Telecom building), also known as the SET building, located in the central reservation of the South Ring Road, west of the RAI metro station.

Only the M5 rolling stock is used on this line (maximum 7 carriages).

=== Service ===
From July 2018 the line's frequency was every 6 minutes during rush hour and every 7.5 minutes during the rest of the day. Due to budget cuts in 2021, the number of trains was reduced from 10 per hour to 8. In September 2023 the service was returned to 10 per hour and starting on 11 December 2023, this has been increased to 12 (every 5 minutes) during rush hour.

== Station list ==
Station	Transfers	Borough
Noord		Noord
Noorderpark		Noord
Centraal	51 Line 51; 53 Line 53; 54 Line 54; Amsterdam–Rotterdam railway; Amsterdam–Schiphol railway; Amsterdam–Arnhem railway; Amsterdam–Zutphen railway; Den Helder–Amsterdam railway	Centrum
Rokin		Centrum
Vijzelgracht		Centrum
De Pijp		Zuid
Europaplein		Zuid
Zuid	50 Line 50; 51 Line 51; Weesp–Leiden railway	Zuid

== Future ==
A number of extension options have been brought up since the line was constructed. These include an extension to Schiphol airport to the south and to Zaandam, Purmerend, and Nieuwendam in the north.

=== Extension to Schiphol ===
The concept of a North-South line running from Amsterdam-Noord through the Centraal Station to Schiphol was explored in the 1968 Stadsspoor plan. According to the plan the line would continue from Amsterdam Zuid through Amstelveen, along the Beneluxbaan and finally arriving at the airport.

It was decided to start development on the Oostlijn first, as this required shorter tunnels and thus a lower budget. After the Nieuwmarkt riots in 1975, all plans for expanding the metro network were suspended.

When the North-South line was eventfully constructed, the initial plan was for it to continue to the airport, but due to budget concerns this was abandoned. In 2015 several relevant parties requested a reconsideration of extending the line to Schiphol. The reasoning was that an increase in public transport capacity to the airport was required. With the metro, several regional trains running between Amsterdam's stations and the airport could be cancelled, making room for more international and long-distance trains.

The extension will not be implemented at least until 2030, as the national government has refused to release funds for this project. While several parties have set aside €1,5 billion in November 2022, this will not allow for realisation without government spending, as the project is projected at €4 billion.

=== Extension to Zaandam and Purmerend ===
In the Noord-Holland provincial coalition agreement in 2019, GroenLinks, VVD, D66, and PvdA seemed to be in favour of extending the line north to Zaandam and Purmerend. They decided that a feasibility study should be done during the years 2019 - 2023 for this extension.

==== Zaandam ====
The extension to Zaandam would have branched off from the in 2021 cancelled Sixhaven metro station, and continued through Amsterdam Noord via the Klaprozenweg and Cornelis Douwesweg to reach Hembrugterrein in Zaandam via the IJpolder. This extension would have been particularly useful once the large housing area of the planned Haven-Stad had been built. The plan provides for more than ten thousand homes in the area.

== Gallery ==
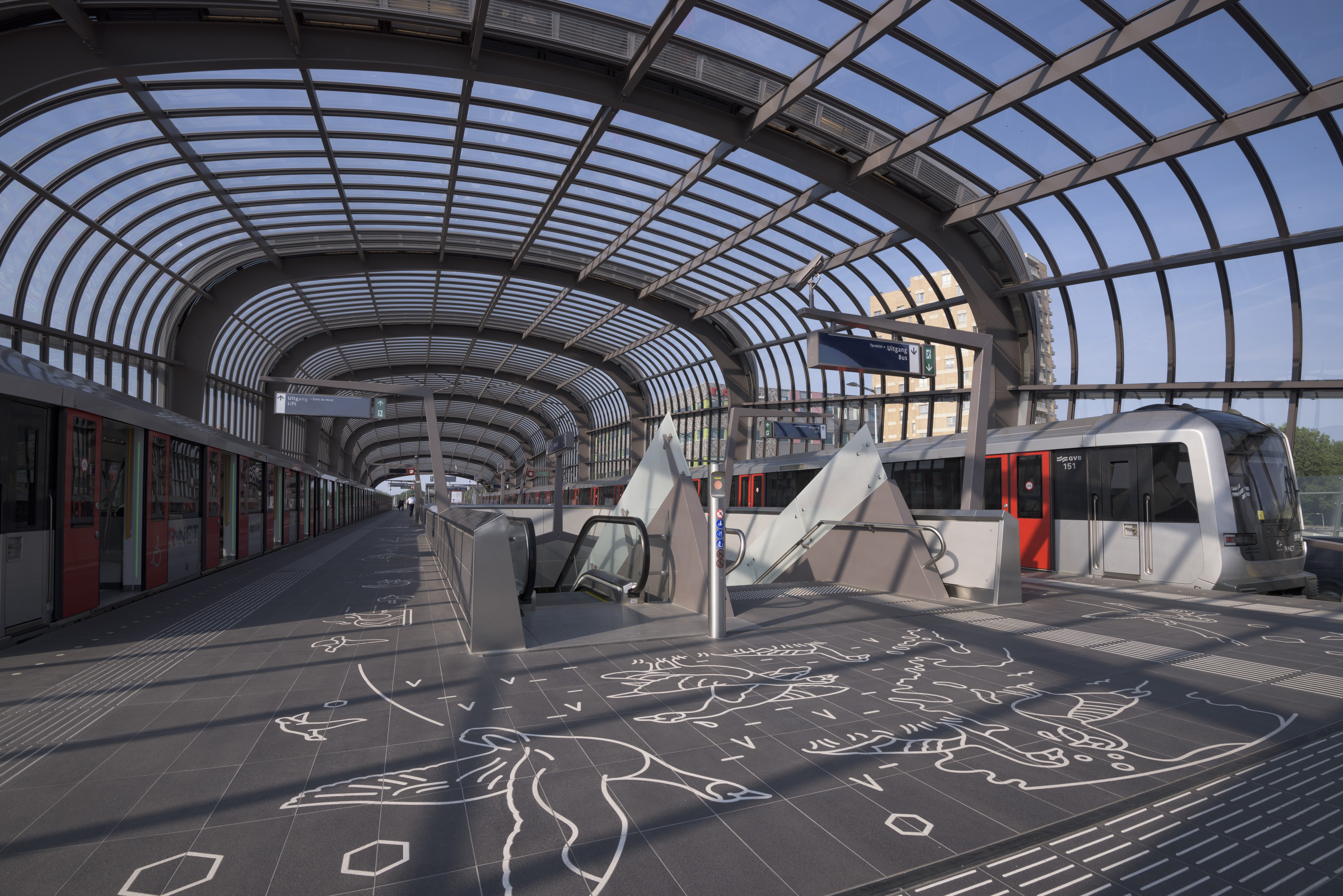
Noord station, terminus of the line

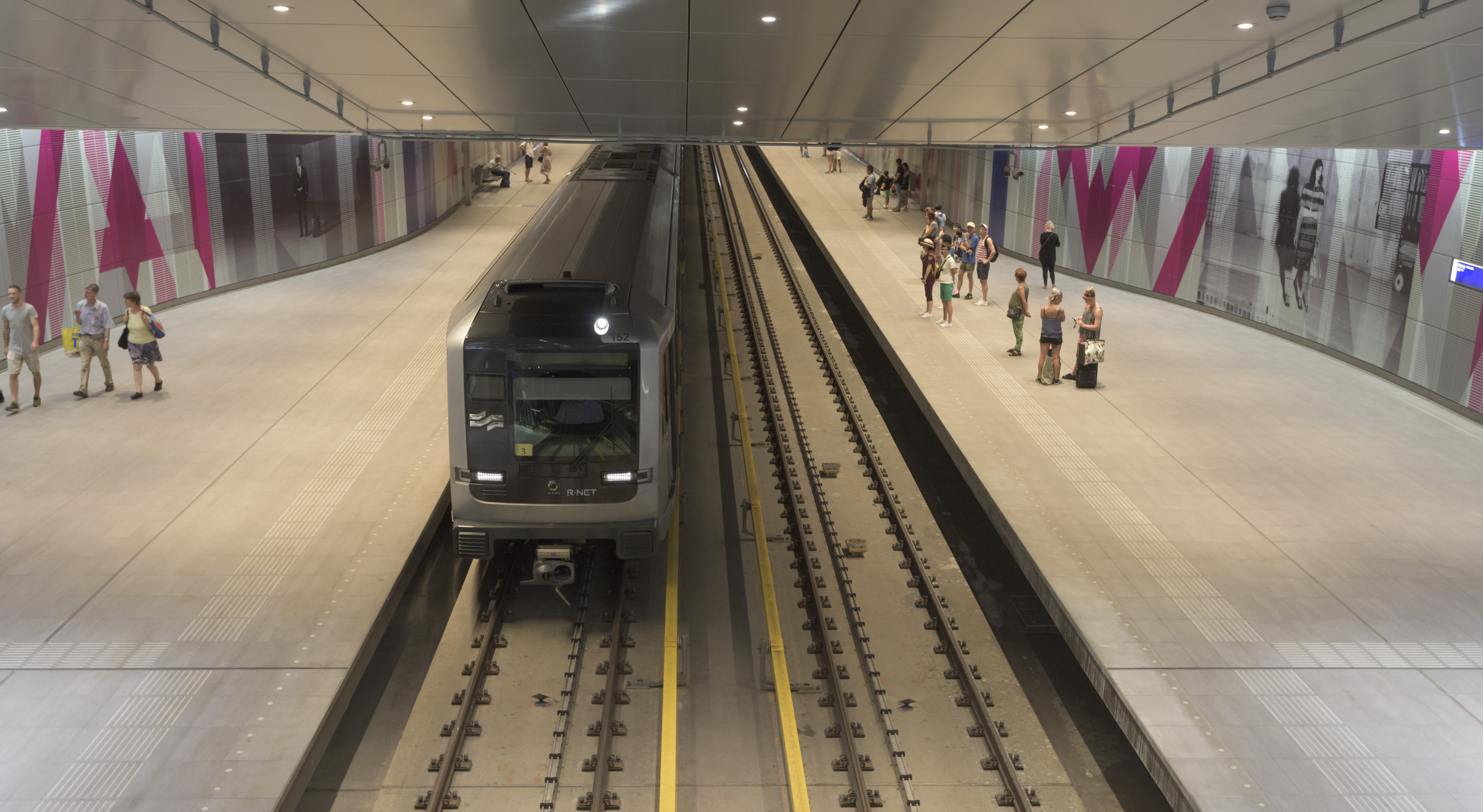
A M5 series train in Europaplein station

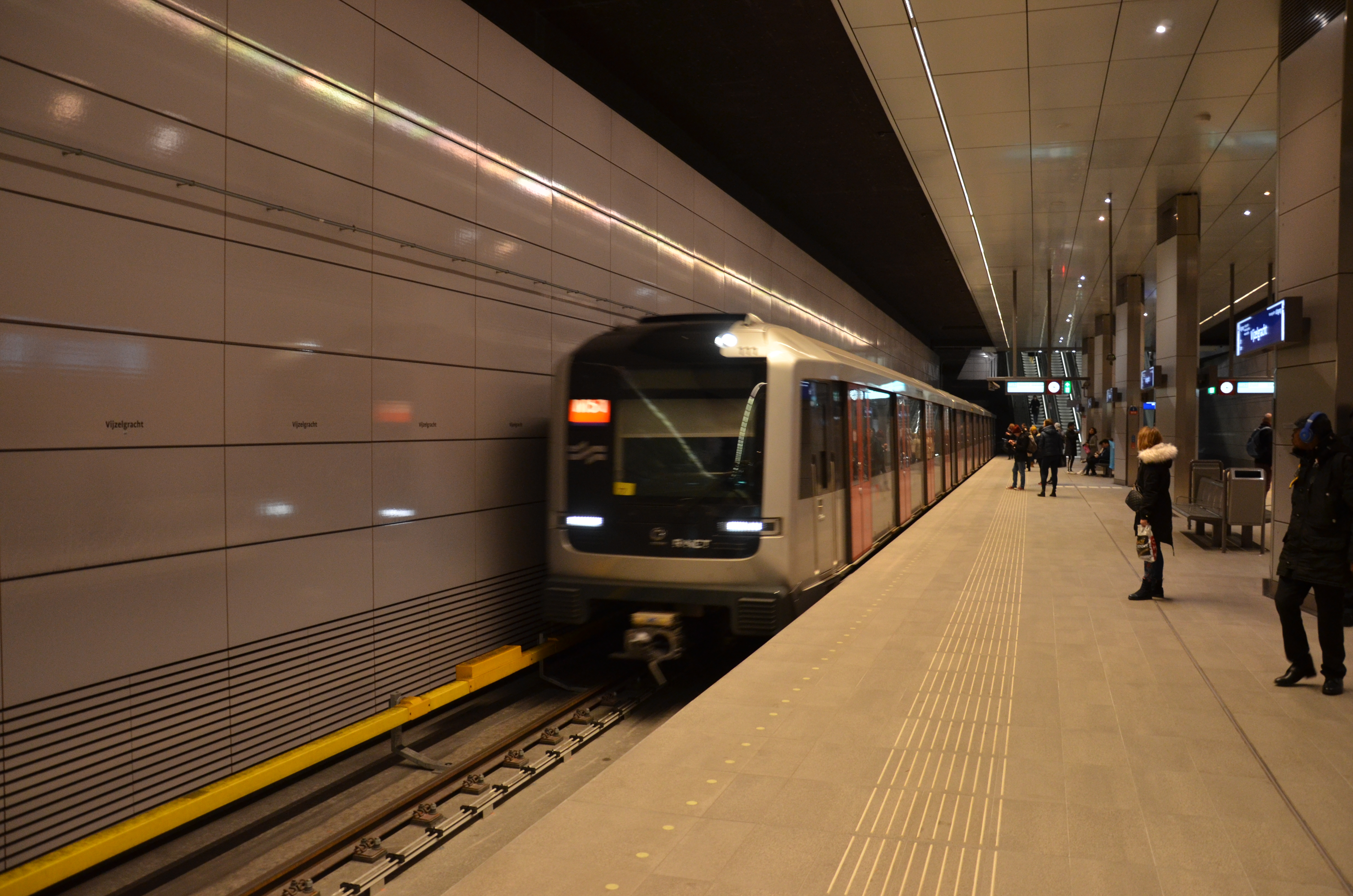
A M5 series train entering Vijzelgracht station

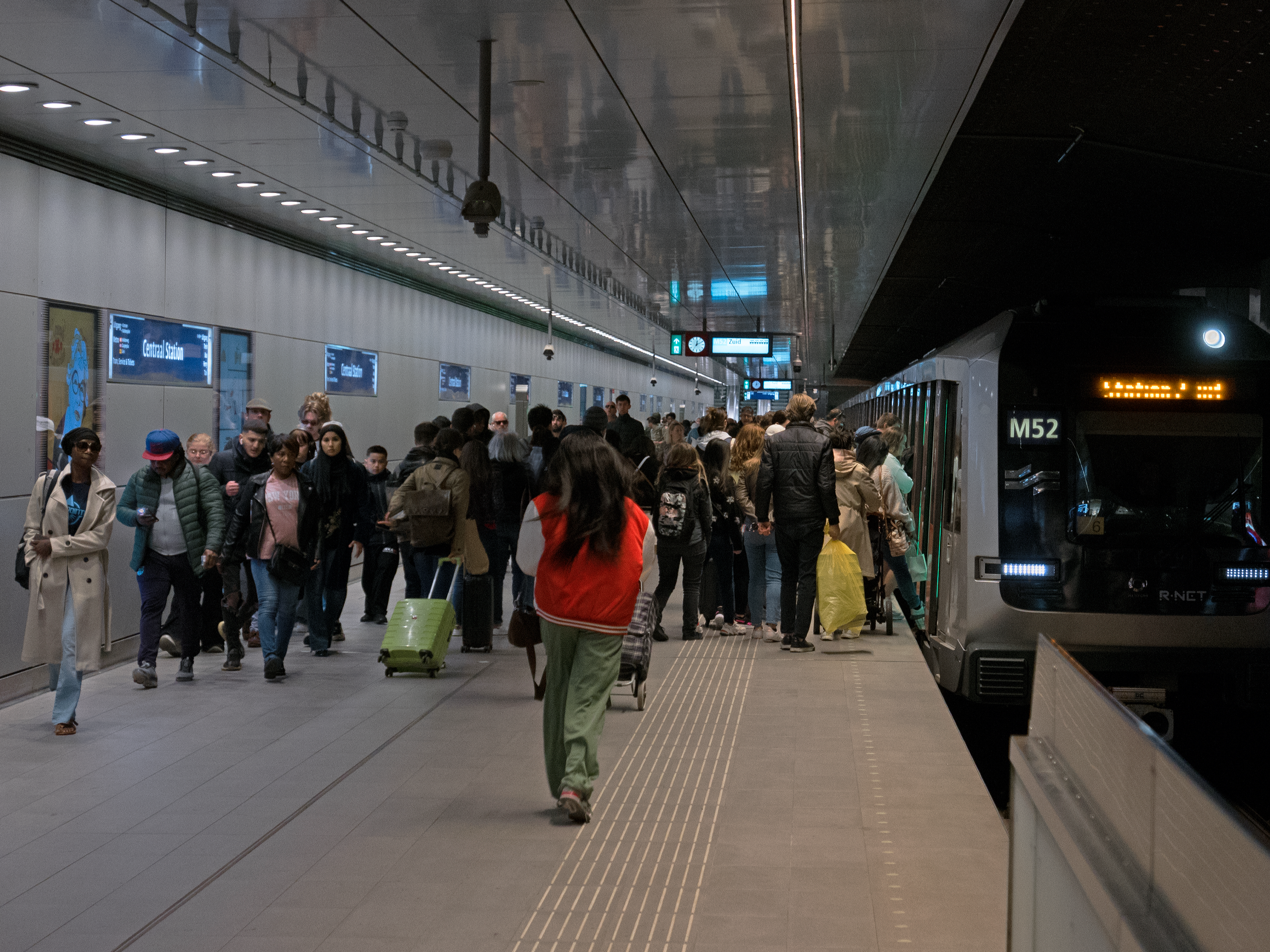
Metro line 52 platform in Amsterdam Centraal station
