= Noorderpark metro station =

Station on the North–South Line of the Amsterdam Metro

Noorderpark
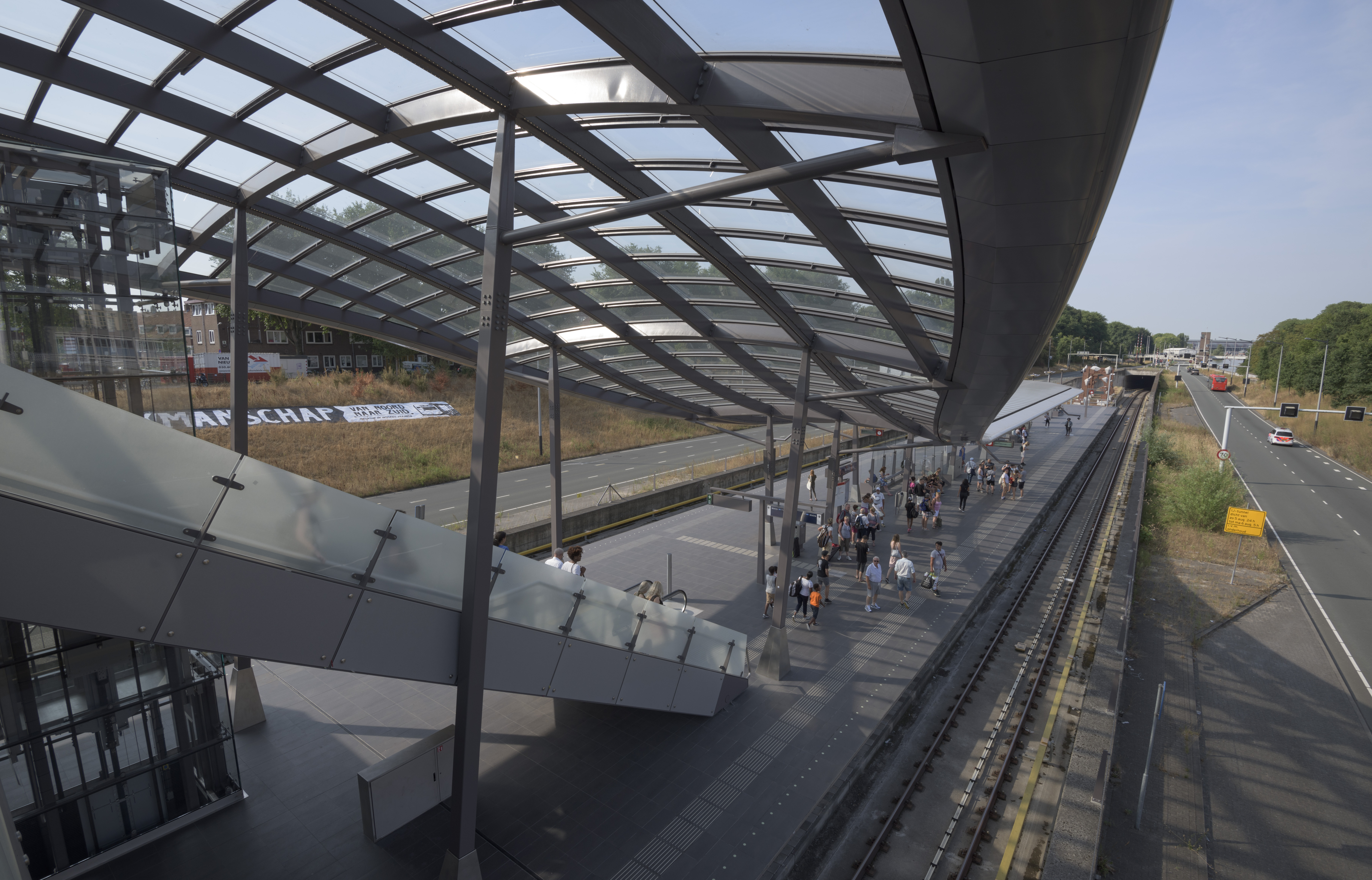
- Noorderpark metro station

General information
- Location: Noord, Amsterdam, Netherlands
- Coordinates: 52°23′21″N 4°55′9″E
- Owner: City of Amsterdam
- Operator: GVB
- Line: 52 (Metro)
- Platforms: 2 centre platforms
- Tracks: 2

Other information
- Station code: NDP
- Fare zone: 5711 (Noord)

History
- Opened: 22 July 2018

Services
Preceding station	Amsterdam Metro	Following station
Noord Terminus	Line 52	Centraal Station towards Station Zuid
Location
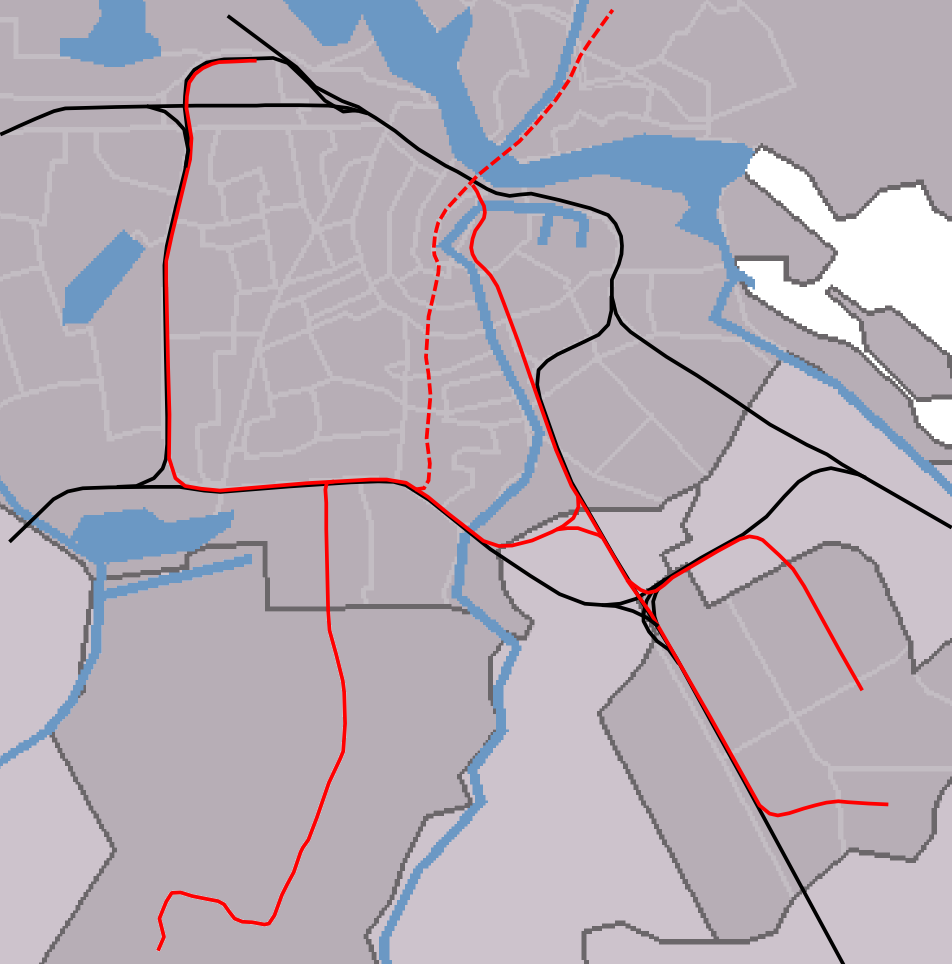
- Location within metro van Amsterdam

Noorderpark is a station on the Amsterdam Metro's Route 52 (North–South Line) in Amsterdam, Netherlands. The line and station were opened on 22 July 2018.

== Location ==
Noorderpark is an elevated station situated in the IJplein en Vogelbuurt neighbourhood of the borough of Amsterdam-Noord (Amsterdam North). It one of two northern stations of the Route 52, which is running on the North-South Line. This metro route provides the northern borough with direct, rapid transit access to Amsterdam Centraal station, the Amsterdam city centre and the southern borough where it terminates at Amsterdam Zuid station.

== Bus Services ==
These services are operated by GVB.

- 34 Noorderpark - Mosplein - Banne Buiksloot - Station Noord - Olof Palmeplein
- 35 Olof Palmeplein - Nieuwendam - Noorderpark - Mosplein - Molenwijk
