= Noord metro station =

Elevated metro station in Amsterdam

Noord
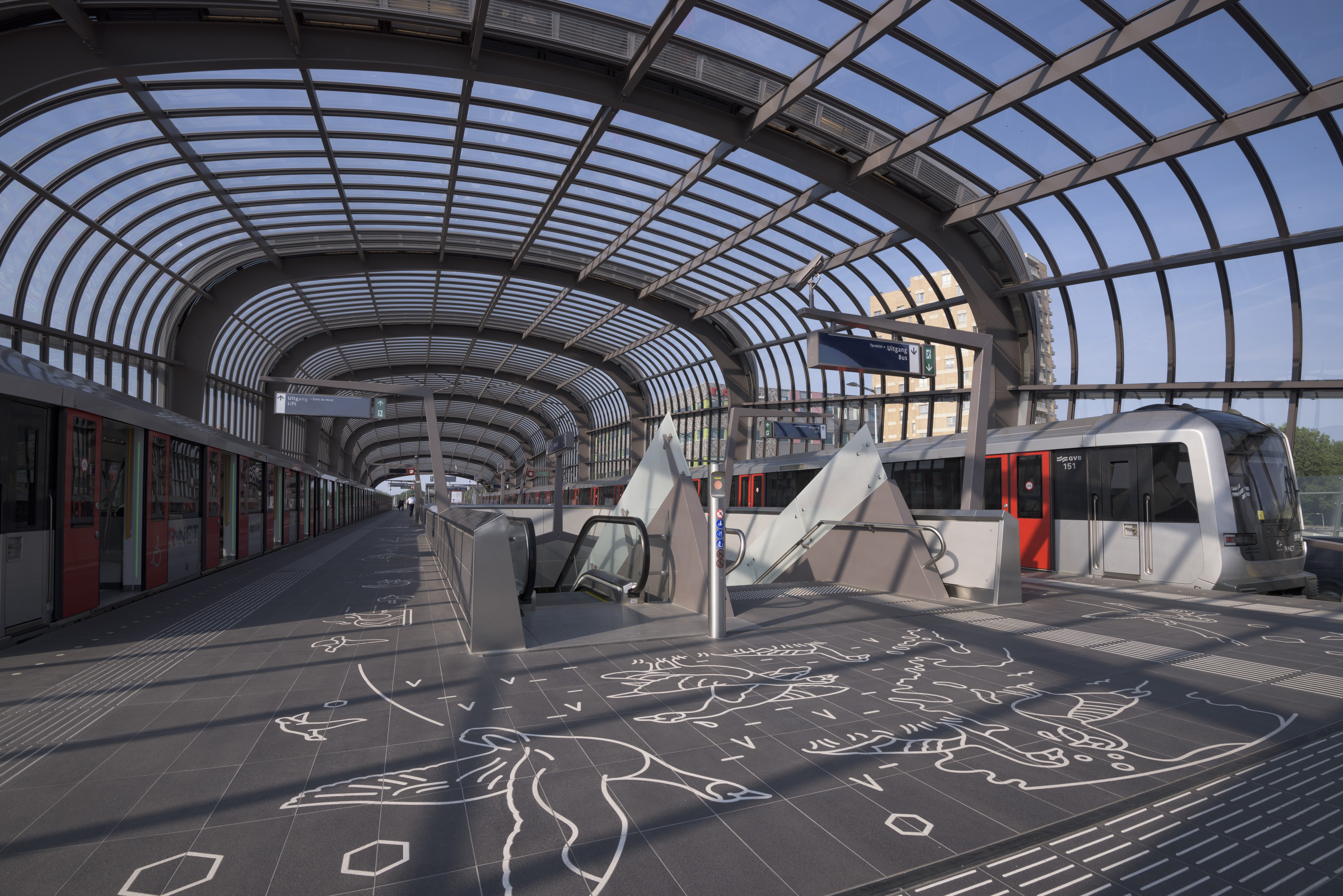
- Noord metro station in 2018

General information
- Location: Buikslotermeer, Amsterdam, Netherlands
- Coordinates: 52°24′6″N 4°55′56″E
- Owner: City of Amsterdam
- Operator: GVB
- Line: 52 (Metro)
- Platforms: 2
- Tracks: 2

Other information
- Fare zone: 5711 (Noord)

History
- Opened: 22 July 2018

Services
| Preceding station | Amsterdam Metro | Following station |
|---|---|---|
| Terminus | Line 52 | Noorderpark towards Station Zuid |
Location
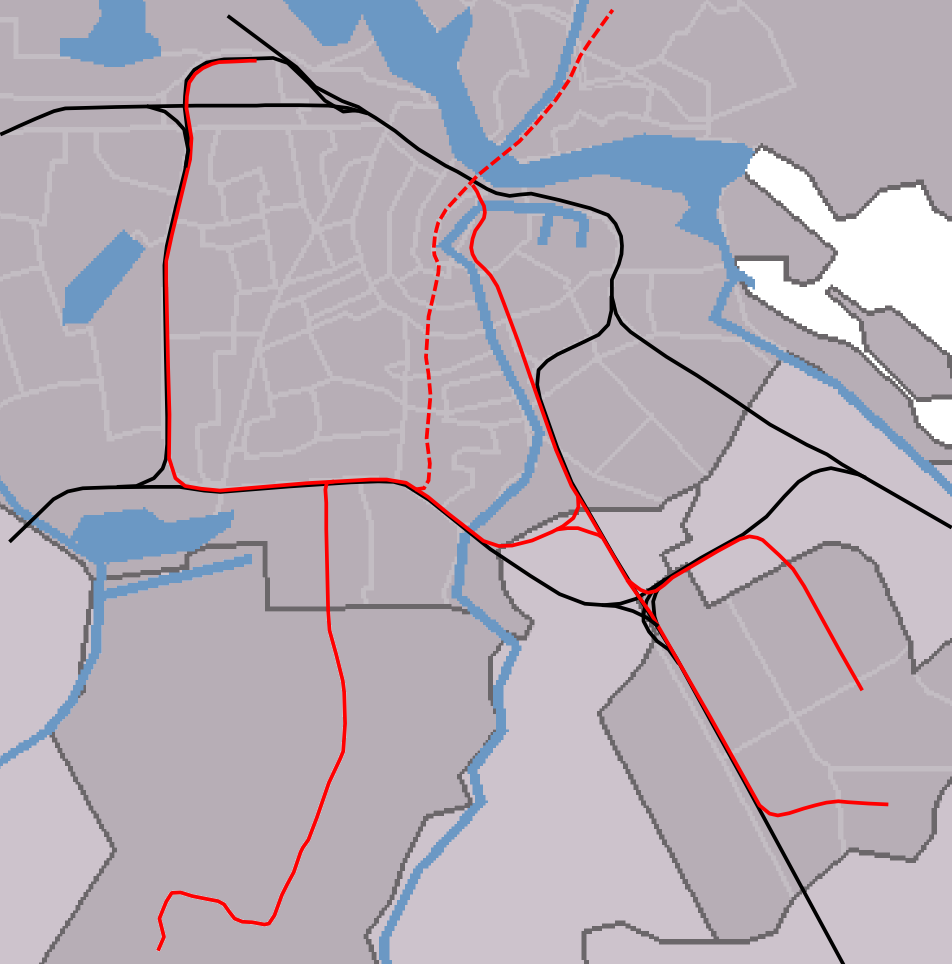
- Location within metro van Amsterdam

Station Noord (Dutch: Station Noord) is the northernmost station of the Amsterdam Metro's Route 52 (North–South Line) in Amsterdam, Netherlands. The line and station were opened on 22 July 2018.

== Location ==
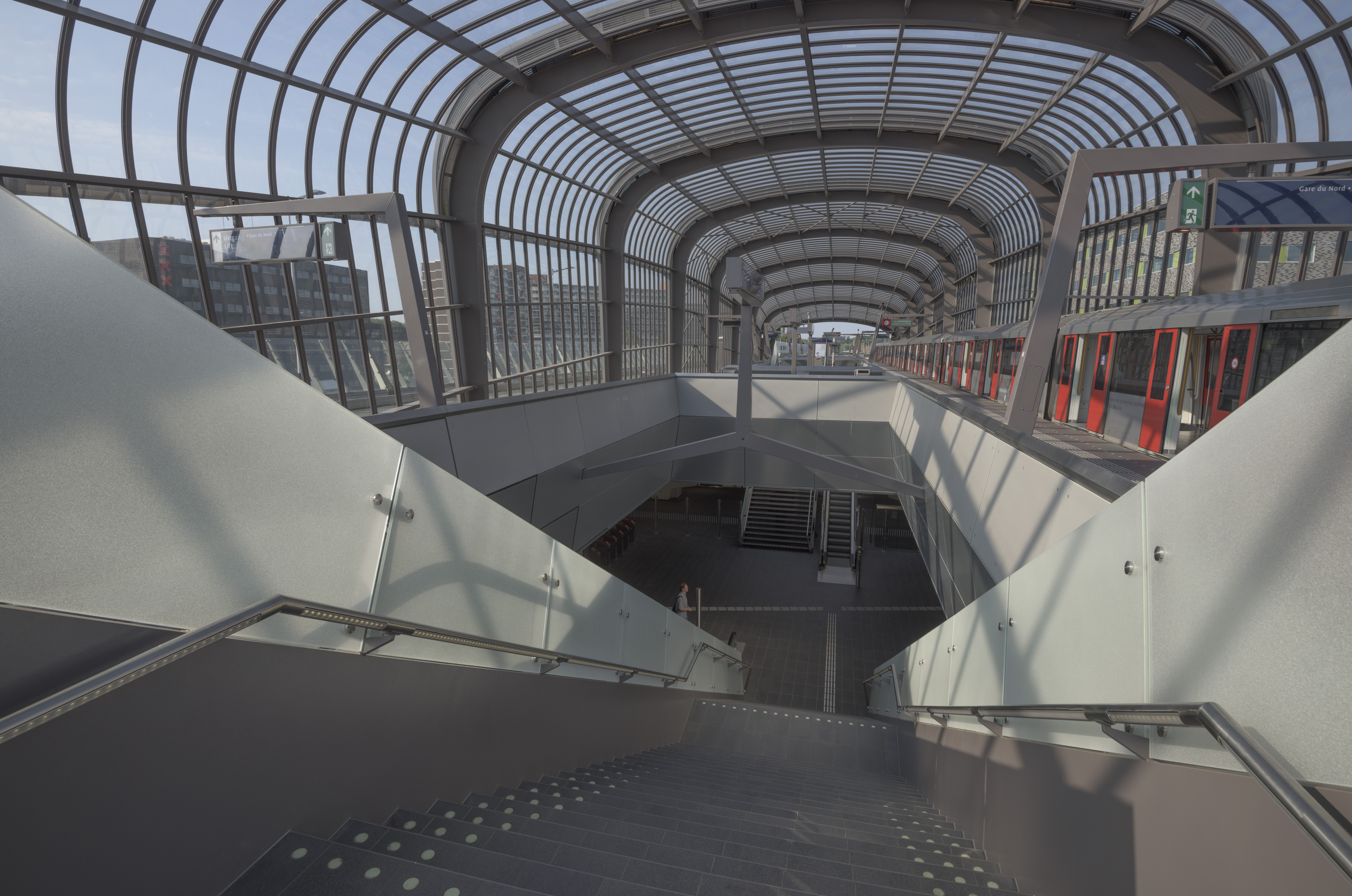
A view of the station's entrance and exit hall from its island platform

- Noord is an overground station situated in the Buikslotermeer neighbourhood of the borough of Amsterdam-Noord (Amsterdam North). It is the northern terminus of the Route 52, which is running on the North-South Line. This metro route provides the northern borough with direct, rapid transit access to Amsterdam Centraal station, the Amsterdam city centre and the southern borough where it terminates at Amsterdam Zuid station. It is projected that more than 42,500 passengers will be using the station on a daily basis.

Until March 2012, the station was named Buikslotermeerplein after the nearby square. On 7 April 2014, with the placement of the first frame for the station roof, the highest point of the new metro line was reached.

== Design ==
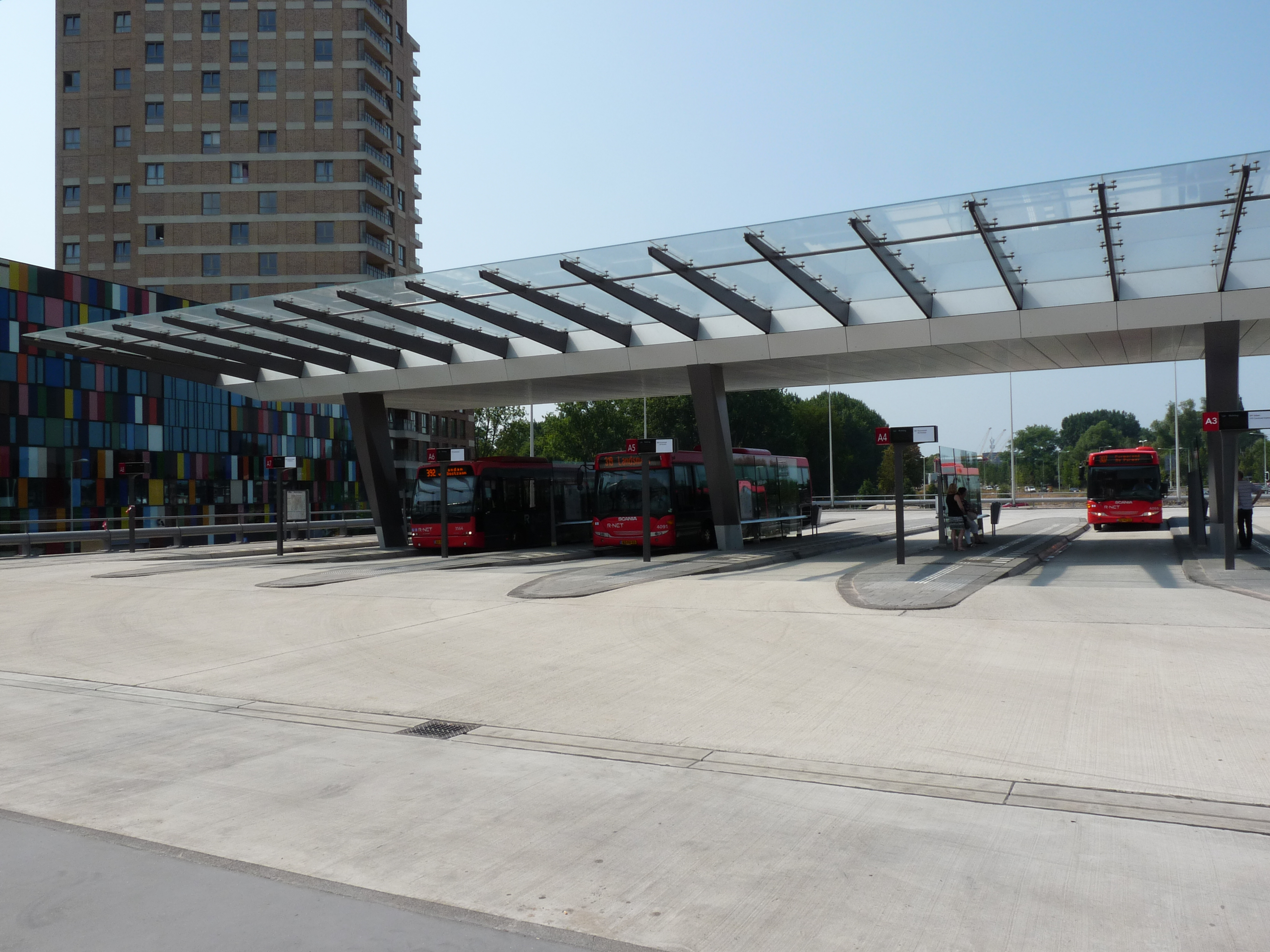
Noord bus station near the metro station.

The station, designed by Benthem Crouwel Architects, is situated on a new crossover in the median of the Nieuwe Leeuwarderweg thoroughfare. The station has two entrances and a platform island of about 130 metres long and 13.1 metres wide, in which five open spaces are created. On either side of each open space, the platform is 3.5 metres wide. On the north side of the station, a bus station as well as a train yard are constructed. In May 2013, a municipal advisory committee selected an artwork by Harmen Liemburg to be installed at this station. It is a drawing based on old maps and the various birds that live in and around Amsterdam, which will be carved out in the floor tiles of the platform.

Along with the construction of the metro station, the surrounding area will be revived. Next to the station site is the new Borough Council Office, which was opened in 1999. To the east of the station site is the shopping centre Boven 't IJ, which is renovated and expanded with apartments, sports facilities, a cultural centre, a movie theater, educational facilities and office space. The new streets in the immediate vicinity of the station were named after major train and subway stations in other European capitals: Gare du Nord, King's Cross and Termini.

== Connections ==
=== Buses ===
City Buses

These services are operated by GVB.

- 34 - Olof Palmeplein - Station Noord - Banne Buiksloot - Mosplein - Noorderpark
- 36 - Station Noord - Banne Buiksloot - Molenwijk - Station Sloterdijk
- 37 - Station Noord - Nieuwendam - Zuiderzeeweg - Flevopark - Muiderpoortstation - Transvaalbuurt - Amstelstation
- 38 - Station Noord - Olof Palmeplein - Vogelbuurt - Buiksloterwegveer - Overhoeks - Buiksloterham

Regional Buses

These buses are operated by EBS and Connexxion, as part of the R-net network.

- 301 - Amsterdam Metro Noord - Schouw - Watergang - Ilpendam - Purmerend Tramplein - Purmerend Overwhere
- 304 - Amsterdam Metro Noord - Ilpendam - Purmerend de Purmer
- 307 - Amsterdam Metro Noord - Schouw - Ilpendam - Purmerend de Purmer
- 308 - Amsterdam Metro Noord - Ilpendam - Purmerend Weidevenne
- 312 - Amsterdam Metro Noord - Schouw - Broek in Waterland - Monnickendam - Katwoude - Volendam - Edam
- 315 - Amsterdam Metro Noord - Schouw - Broek in Waterland - Monnickendam - Zuiderwoude - Marken
- 319 - Amsterdam Metro Noord - Landsmeer
- 392 - Amsterdam Metro Noord - Oostzaan - Zaandam De Vlinder - Zaandam Station
