= S1/S2 (Amsterdam Metro) =

Rolling stock of the Amsterdam Metro, 1990–2024

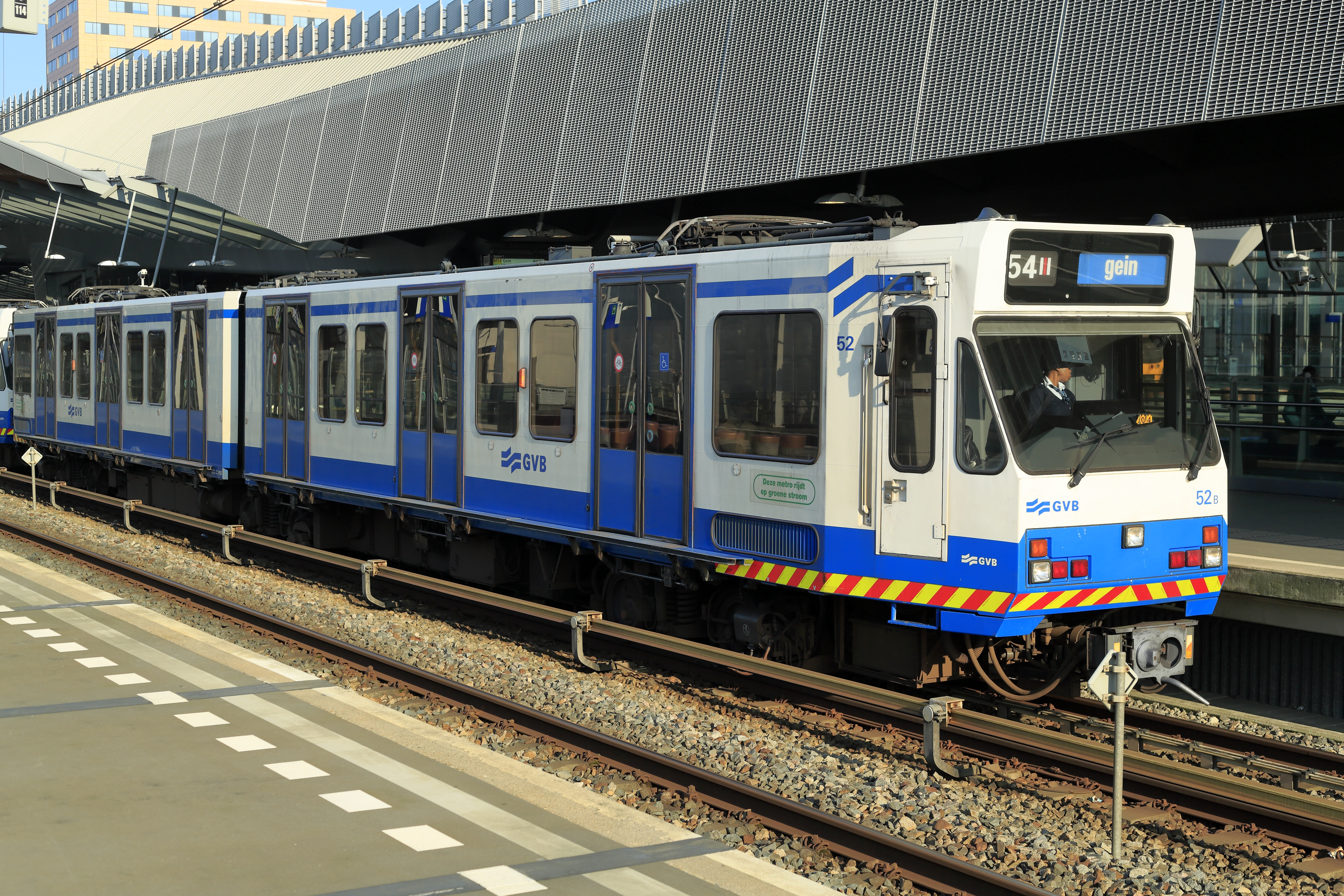
- An S1 unit in the blue GVB livery

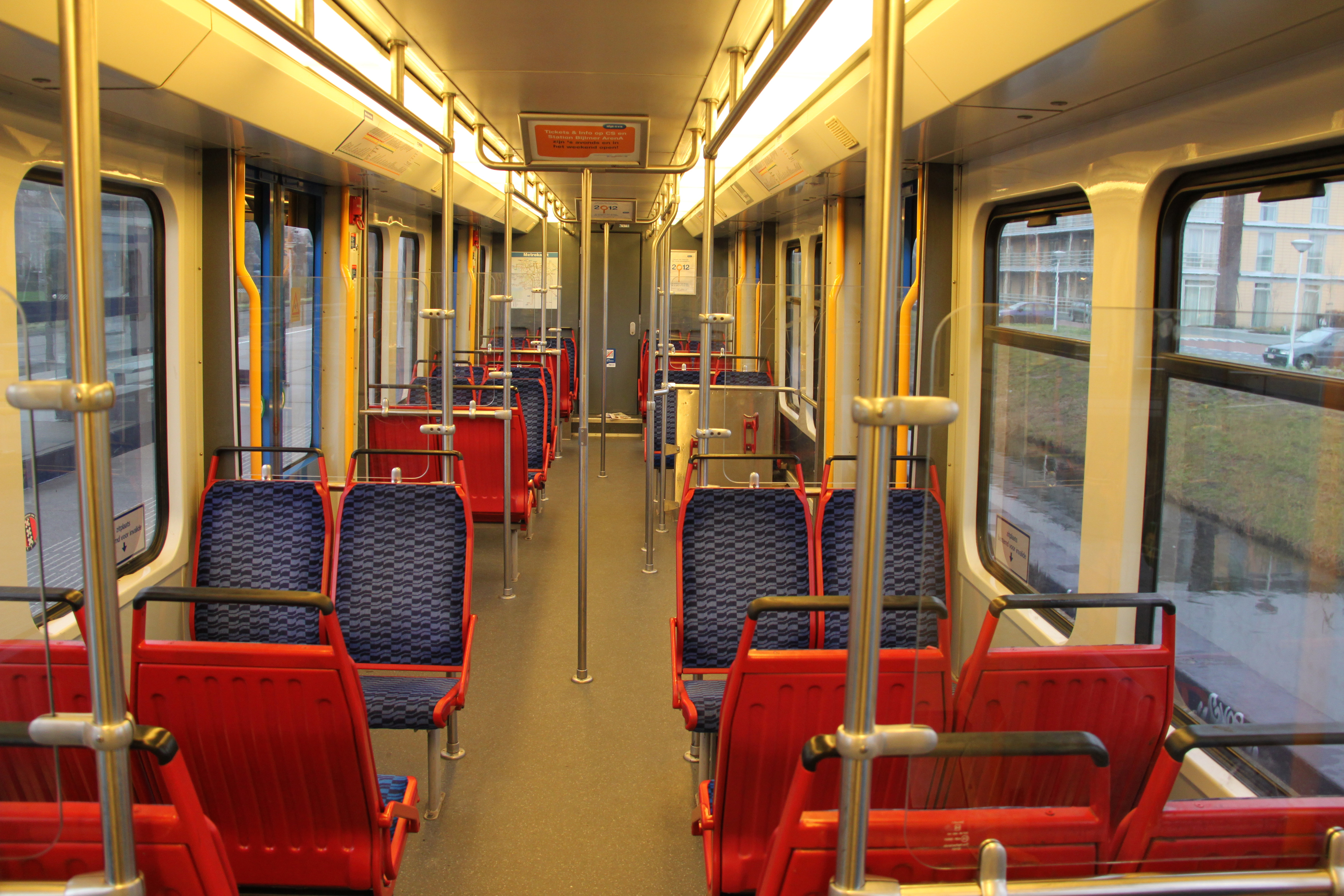
- Interior of unit 67 while in use as express tram
- Stock type: Express tram Metro
- In service: 1990–2024
- Manufacturer: La Brugeoise et Nivelles
- Entered service: S1: 1990; S2: 1993–1994
- Retired: 2023–2024
- Number built: 25
- Number preserved: 1
- Successor: M7
- Fleet numbers: S1: 45–57; S2: 58–69
- Capacity: 64 (seated); 190 (standing)
- Owner: Amsterdam Metro
- Operator: GVB
- Lines served: 50 Line 50 (2019–2024); 51 Line 51 (1990–2024); 53 Line 53 (2019–2024); 54 Line 54 (2019–2024)

Specifications
- Train length: 30.6 m (100 ft 5 in)
- Width: 2.65 m (8 ft 8 in)
- Height: 3.42 m (11 ft 3 in)
- Doors: 6 doors per side
- Maximum speed: 70 km/h (43 mph)
- Weight: 46.3 t (102,000 lb)
- Traction system: Holec SCR-VVVF
- Electric systems: Third rail, 750 V DC; Overhead line, 600 V DC

S1 and S2 units, collectively called S1/S2, were electric multiple unit trains used on the Amsterdam Metro in Amsterdam, The Netherlands. Built by La Brugeoise et Nivelles (BN), 13 of these units were ordered by the GVB in 1988 (S1), as well as an additional 12 later in 1991 (S2), for a new line from Amsterdam Centraal station to the suburb of Amstelveen. This line, named the Amstelveen Line and later numbered as 51, was initially expected to be a full metro line, but it was later changed to a tram-metro hybrid named sneltram (express tram) due to protests against the metro in the preceding decades. From Amsterdam Centraal to Amsterdam Zuid, Line 51 ran as a regular metro on 750 V DC with third rail pick up, used on the regular metro network. At Zuid, the trains converted to 600 V DC via overhead lines, used by the city's tram network, and served Amstelveen as a faster tram service. On the latter part of the route, the line shared tracks and stops with a regular tram line and ran on public roads with crossings.

The line was opened on 30 November 1990 with S1 units in service. Problems with the trains started immediately as the majority of the fleet was unavailable at the start due to technical issues, which led to capacity problems. With financial compensation and technical support from BN, as well as the delivery of S2 units from 1993 onward, most of these issues were resolved, allowing the GVB to run coupled trains on the line by 1994. Further issues arose in the Amstelveen section of the route; the high speed and the sharp front profile of the units resulted in several deaths at the level crossings, prompting protests and further safety measures. The complex conversion from metro to tram at Zuid was a persistent issue for these units that poorly impacted their reliability. When the Amstelveen branch of Line 51 was shut down in 2019 and later replaced by a regular tram line, the S1/S2 trains started running on the new Line 51 and also on other metro lines of the system. The first units were retired and scrapped in 2023 after 33 years of service. A farewell event was organized in 2024; one of the units was preserved.

== Background ==
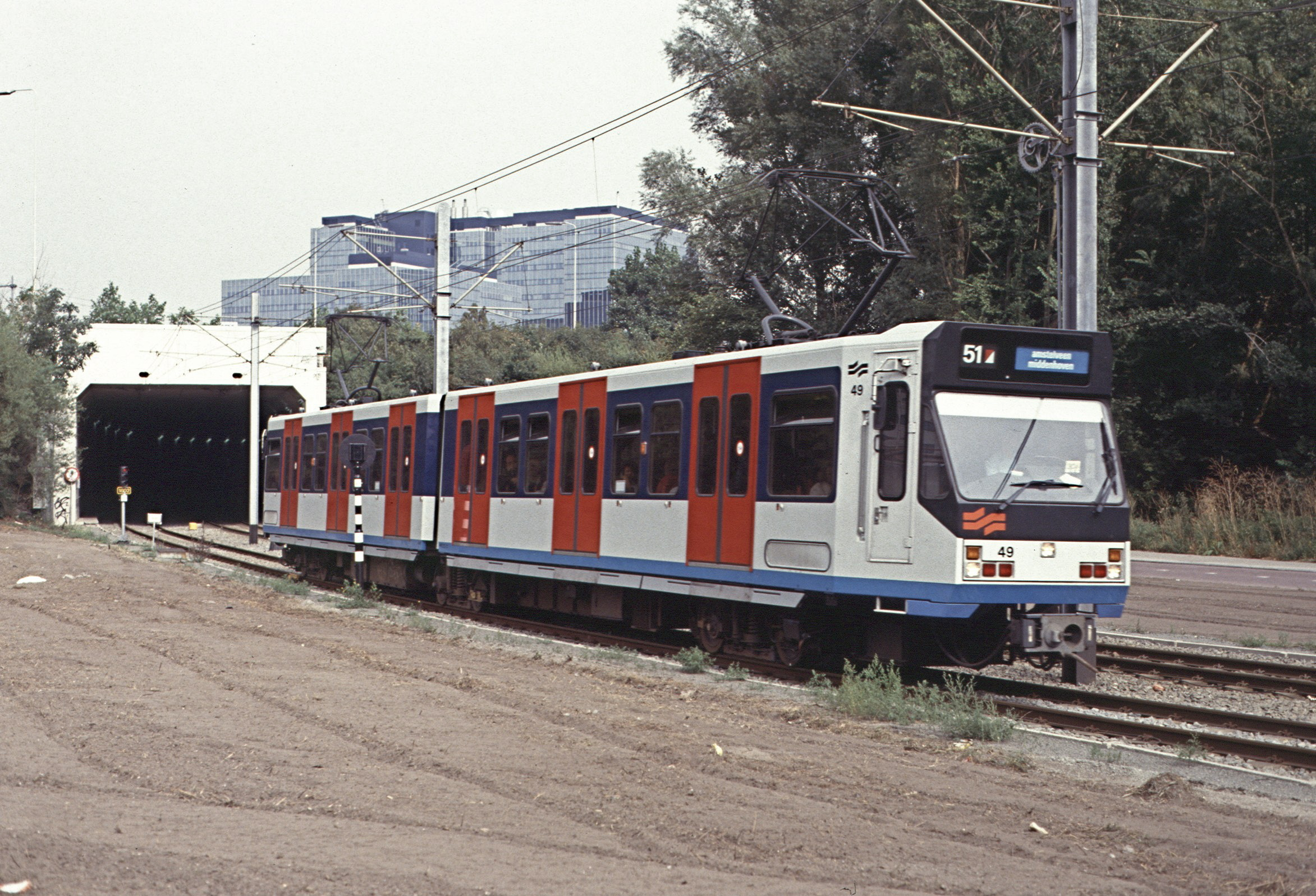
An S1 unit in its original livery leaving the tunnel at Amsterdam Zuid, just after converting from third rail to overhead lines.

In February 1985, the Municipalities of Amsterdam and the suburb of Amstelveen agreed on building a sneltram line from Amsterdam Centraal station to Southern Amstelveen, named the Amstelveen Line. The term express tram was the result of a compromise between the two; Amstelveen initially wanted a full metro, while this was still politically controversial in Amsterdam due to the protests against the metro a decade earlier. The express tram was paired with a regular tram line from the city center of Amstelveen to Amsterdam Centraal, but a different route west of the express tram. However, the two lines would share the same track in the suburb which had 15 level crossings, unusual for a metro. This meant that the line ran as a metro from Amsterdam Centraal to Amsterdam Zuid and was fully integrated into the system, while switching to a tram service after Zuid until its terminus. The Amstelveen Line was later officially numbered as Line 51.

At the time, no rolling stock existed that was able to convert from a metro to a tram mid-service. With only some technical drawings available, the GVB approached two German manufacturers and the Belgian La Brugeoise et Nivelles (BN) for a train that was able to operate on the line. BN was later picked for the project and 13 trains were ordered in 1988, only for use as Line 51. These trains were delivered in time before the opening in 1990 from the BN factory in Bruges. BN was also responsible for building the 11G and 12G trams to be used on the regular tram line. In 1989, the municipality recalculated the number of trains needed to operate the line and came to the conclusion that an additional 12 units were needed. By the time the line opened, the ministry still had not allocated the required funding for the extra trains. The order was placed after funding was approved by the ministry in early 1991. Two units arrived in 1993, while the remaining ten were delivered a year later. Capacity issues on the line were resolved following this as the trams started running coupled together in March 1994. The first 13 units (45–57) are named S1 while the 12 units (58–69) from the additional order are named S2. Despite the trains themselves being managed by the metro division of the GVB, the section of track in Amstelveen was entirely under the responsibility of its tram division.

== Operational history ==
=== Early operations and start-up problems ===
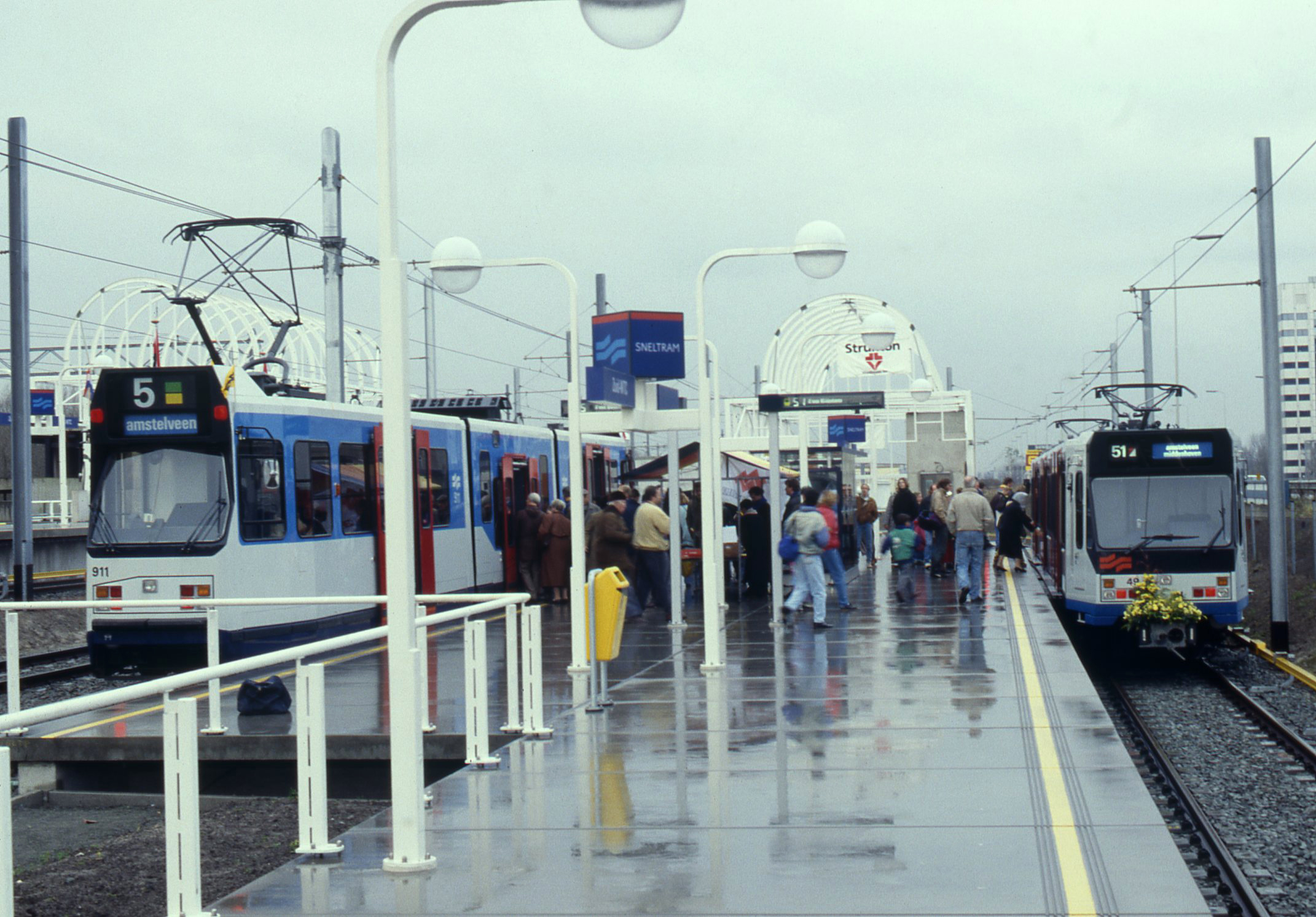
A regular tram and an S1 unit side by side during the opening day at Amsterdam Zuid, where the conversion happened.

Testing of the new tram units started in May 1990. A few weeks before the scheduled opening, two trains collided during a test run and were damaged, resulting in a reduced frequency at opening. The S1 trains went into service with the official opening on 30 November 1990. Problems with the trams started within a week of the opening; 5 of the 13 units were out of order due to technical problems or repairs. There were problems with the retractable footboards caused by a design error, which was later fixed by BN for free. The capacity of the remaining trains was not enough and some people were left behind on the platform during rush hours due to the vehicles being full. Line 51 stopped serving Amstelveen and was shortened from Centraal to Zuid in February 1991 as 11 of the units were not running due to technical problems caused by the winter. Service on the full route was resumed seven months later in September. GVB put the blame of the capacity and technical issues that occurred after the opening of the line on the constructor and considered asking for financial compensation. BN argued that these were simple teething troubles of the complex system and that the conventional trams, which were delivered a year before opening, did not have any problems.

In October 1995, residents of Buitenveldert started a campaign in to increase the safety of the level crossings of the express tram after three people were killed in separate accidents within a month and many heavy accidents occurred. They argued that the precautions taken at crossings, consisting of just a flashing light, to be insufficient despite the trams passing at high speed through traffic and threatened to block the crossings with cars if their demands were not met. The trams can go through crossings at a high speed as the traffic light immediately turns white—meaning proceed for public transit—when a tram is approaching, quickly leading to collisions when pedestrians, bikers or cars fail to stop at their red light. The front of the S1/S2 units are also considered to be more dangerous than regular trams. The sharp edges, coupling mechanism and the lack of a wheel cover could cause people to end up under the tram and lead to serious or fatal injuries even at lower speeds. The GVB announced the next day that it would install fences and warning signs at some crossings. Following an investigation a week later, maximum speed on some crossings was limited to 40 km/h (25 mph) for the trams.

An express tram caught fire at Weesperplein metro station on 12 July 1999 due to a blocked disc brake. Although the tram was carrying no passengers at the time, the smoke coming from the fire caused all levels of the station to be evacuated. Two people were taken to hospital for smoke inhalation but were discharged quickly after their injuries were determined to be minor. As time progressed the number of problems and accidents decreased, and the units became more reliable. Around ten people died in collisions involving the express tram during its entire operation span.

=== Final years and retirement ===
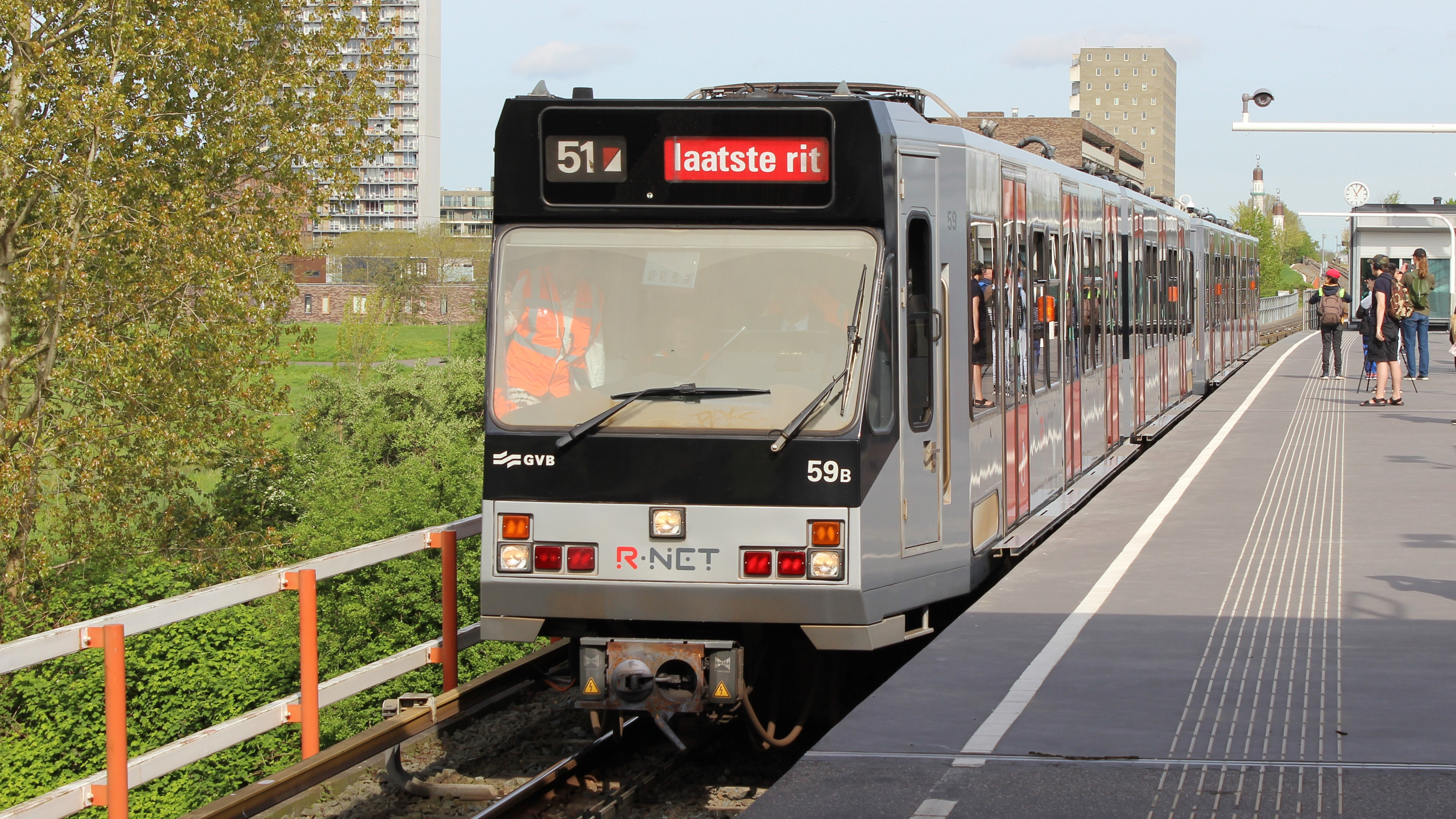
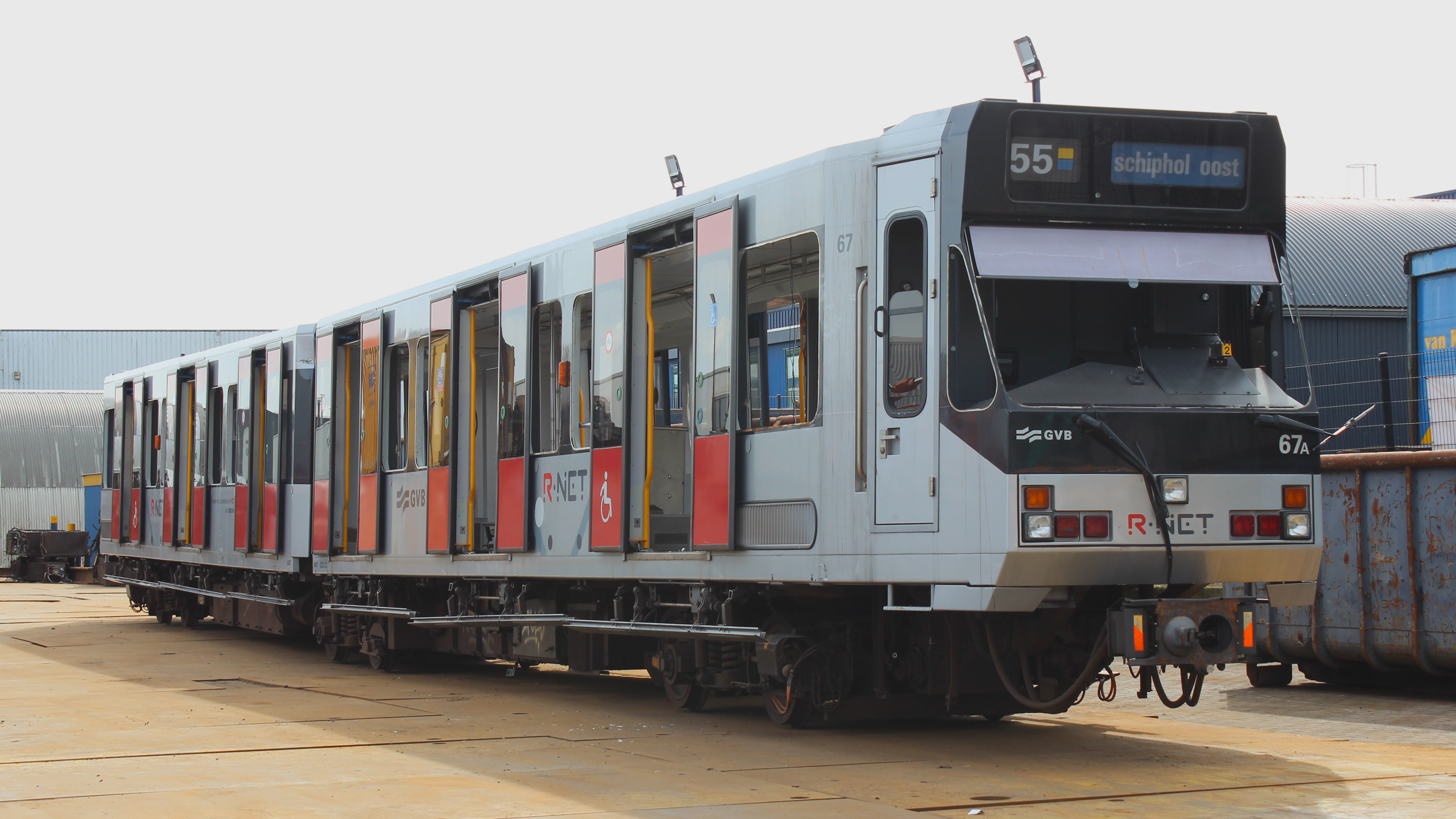
Units 59 and 65 arriving at the farewell event (left) and unit 67 at the scrapyard in De Meern (right), both in their final, R-net-themed, livery.

According to a 2007 study by the municipality, the Amstelveen Line regularly had reliability problems which were mostly caused by the trains switching operation modes mid-route, the many level crossings and because the line was partially running on the same track as a regular tram line. The Amstelveen Line closed on 2 March 2019 and was converted into a proper tram line. Metro 51 kept its original route from Amsterdam Centraal to Zuid; instead of branching off to Amstelveen, it continues west-bound and ends at Isolatorweg. Following the conversion, the S1/S2 trains underwent a technical upgrade for the final time and were used on regular metro lines M50, the new M51, M53 and M54.

The express tram stock was expected to have a lifespan of 30 years or less given the complex operation required. By the 2010s, the units were considered to be prone to technical issues due to their age and were set to go out of service with the arrival of the newer M7 metros. In March 2022, the GVB installed training simulators for all metro types except the sneltrams, because they were soon to go out of service. The following year, with the new metros now in operation, the Amsterdam regional transport authority made the decision to retire the S1/S2 units. A final farewell event was organized on 13 April 2024 at Gaasperplas metro station. Most units were scrapped by DDM in De Meern. Express trams had their systems on the roof removed as they would otherwise have been too high to be transported by road. In De Meern, the units were stripped of all additional materials, leaving the steel framework to be recycled. One unit was preserved as a museum tram.

== Design and specifications ==
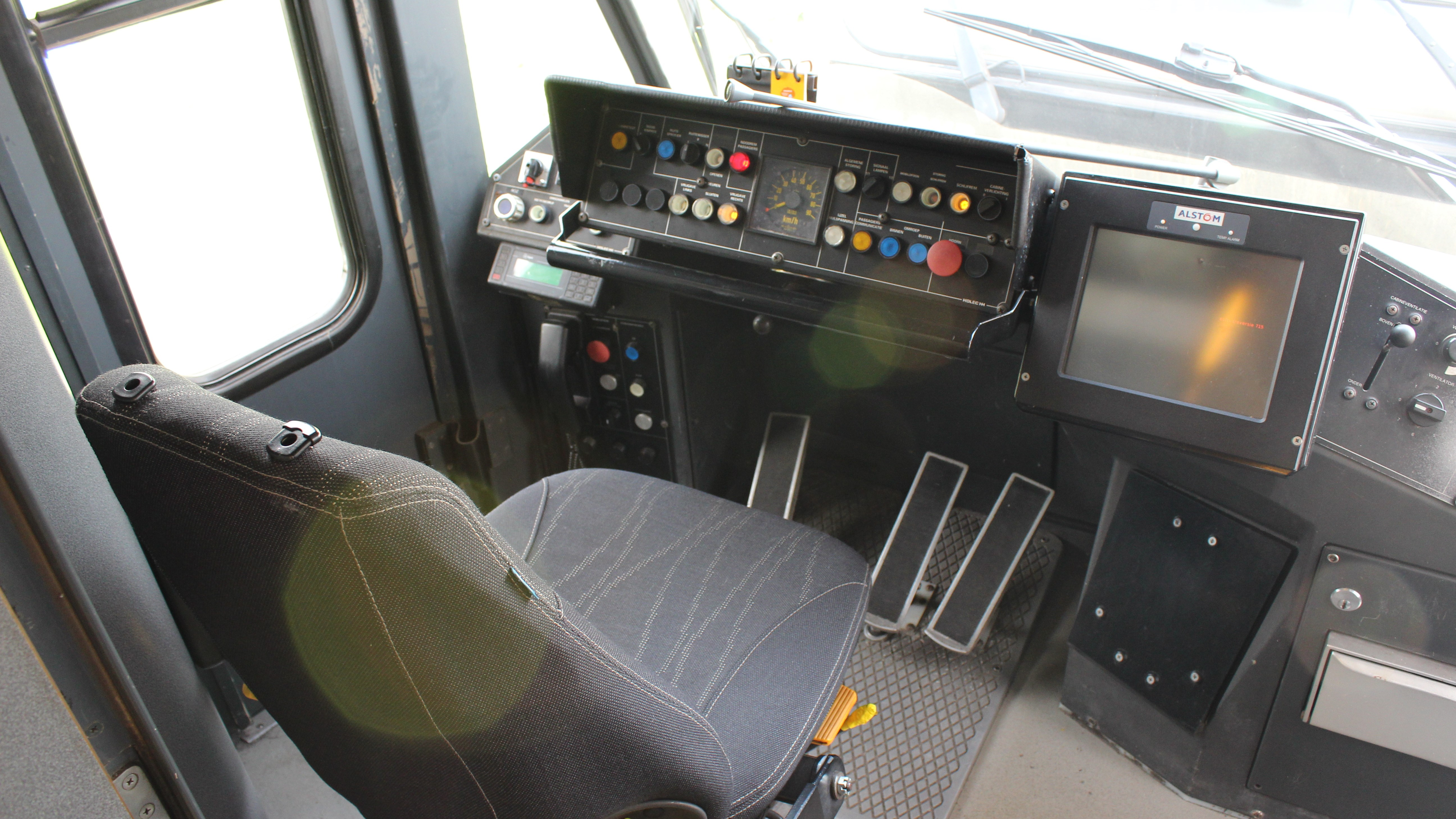
Cab of an S2 unit

The S1/S2 units were designed and built by BN, with their electrical systems being produced by Dutch company Holec. As the line they were supposed to run on was unusual, the express trams were designed exclusively for the GVB. Each unit consists of two 15-metre (49 ft) cars, designated as A and B, and has a total length of 30.6 metres (100 ft), width of 2.65 metres (8.7 ft) and a height of 3.42 metres (11.2 ft), excluding the pantograph. The units have one bogie per car with two axles, as well as a Jacobs bogie between the cars. The wheelbase is 1,900 millimetres (75 in) long, with each wheel having a diameter of 690 millimetres (27 in). All units have a bicycle rack located in car A; S1 units have them on the left side, while the S2 units on the right. The total empty weight is 46.3 tonnes (102,000 lb). An S1/S2 train decelerates with a speed of 1.25 m/s^{2} (4.1 ft/s^{2}) in regular service and as high as 3.2 m/s^{2} (10 ft/s^{2}) during an emergency brake. Acceleration and braking is controlled by foot pedals.

Two units can be coupled together for operation in Amstelveen, while four can run together in the rest of the system. The tram platforms in Amstelveen were built for the width of the trains, while stations on the rest of the system were compatible for a width of 3 metres (9.8 ft). The units were fitted with retractable footboards to bridge the platform gap in those stations. Stops at Amstelveen had both a high floor platform for the express tram and a low floor platform for the regular tram. The S1/S2's high floor of 1,100 millimetres (43 in) provided level boarding at all stations on the network. The units had electrical systems capable of switching between 750 V DC via third rail, used on the regular metro network, and 600 V DC via overhead lines used by regular trams in Amstelveen. These systems powered six motors of 74 kW (99 hp), which allowed the trains to reach a maximum speed of 70 km/h (43 mph).
