= Weesperplein metro station =

Metro station in Amsterdam

Weesperplein
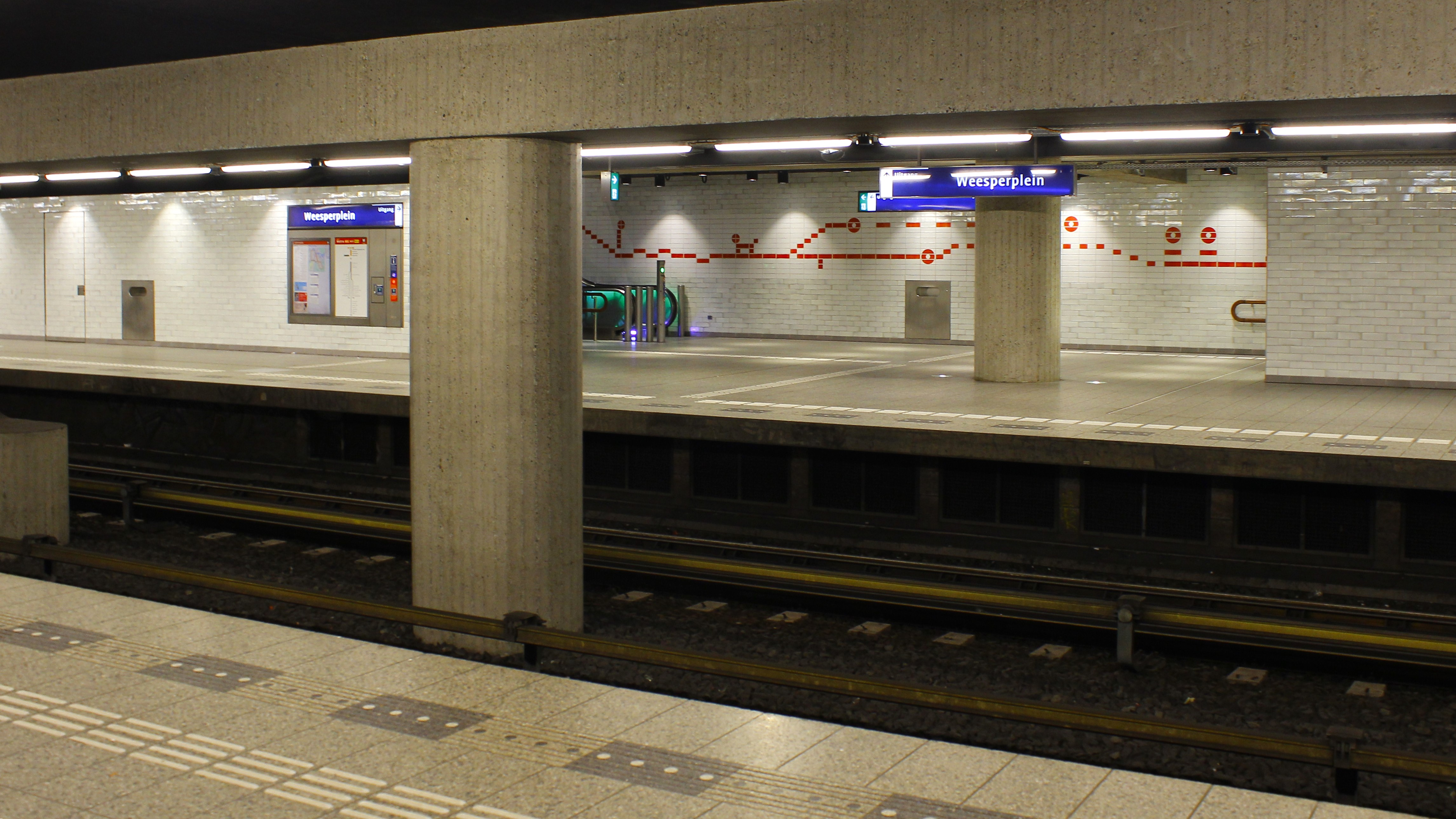
- Track level of the metro station

General information
- Location: Weesperplein, Amsterdam
- Coordinates: 52°21′41″N 4°54′28″E
- Owner: GVB
- Line: 51, 53, 54 (Metro)
- Platforms: 2
- Tracks: 2
- Connections: GVB tram: 1, 7, 19; GVB bus: N85 (night)

Other information
- Fare zone: 5700 (Centrum)

History
- Opened: 16 October 1977
- Rebuilt: 2017–2018

Passengers
- 2023: 32,264
- Rank: 3rd out of 39

Services
| Preceding station | Amsterdam Metro | Following station |
|---|---|---|
| Waterlooplein towards Centraal Station | Line 51 | Wibautstraat towards Isolatorweg |
| Waterlooplein towards Centraal Station | Line 53 | Wibautstraat towards Gaasperplas |
| Waterlooplein towards Centraal Station | Line 54 | Wibautstraat towards Gein |
Location

Weesperplein is an underground metro station in the city centre of Amsterdam, Netherlands. Served by lines 51, 53, and 54 of the Amsterdam Metro, it was constructed using caissons with a length and width of 40 metres (130 ft). It has two floors: the upper floor, with a station hall and stores, and the lower floor, containing the tracks. Construction started in August 1970, and the first test rides passed through in January 1977. Extensive tests were carried out in September that year before it opened on 16 October.

Another platform was built below the existing one, as the station was originally planned to be the intersection of two lines. This platform was instead used as a fallout shelter with a capacity of 5,000 people when most of the network was cancelled in 1975 following protests against the destruction of houses. The shelter was not maintained from 1999 onwards, and equipment was removed in 2004 to make way for smoke-extraction machinery.

Repairs during a renovation in 2011 were of poor quality and were redone several times. Weesperplein was renovated again in 2017–2018 when a new elevator and two more staircases were added between the hall and tracks. It was the third most-used station of the Amsterdam Metro in 2023.

== Layout ==
Weesperplein and other metro stations on the East Line were designed by two architects from the Government of Amsterdam: Ben Spängberg and Sier van Rhijn. The station is located under Weesperstraat and consists of two underground levels. The top level has eight entrances from the streets and includes the paygates of the metro system and some stores such as an Albert Heijn To Go convenience store and a sandwich shop. The latter, opened in 1980 and owned by a couple, was sold off in late 2023 to the restaurant located inside the Waterlooplein metro station. Several other shops used to exist at this level but were later closed. The level below is where the metro tracks are located and has two side platforms. All other metro stations on the East Line have an island platform, but an exception was made for Weesperplein as it was supposed to be a station where two lines would intersect, which also resulted in a larger station hall. The rest of the metro system runs on double-track; Weesperplein is the only station to have a third reserve track in between those two. This track can be used in case of an emergency. In 2018, bicycle parking racks outside one of the entrances were replaced by flowers. The station is of close proximity to the campusses of University of Amsterdam (UvA) and Amsterdam University of Applied Sciences (HvA).

=== Ghost station and shelter ===
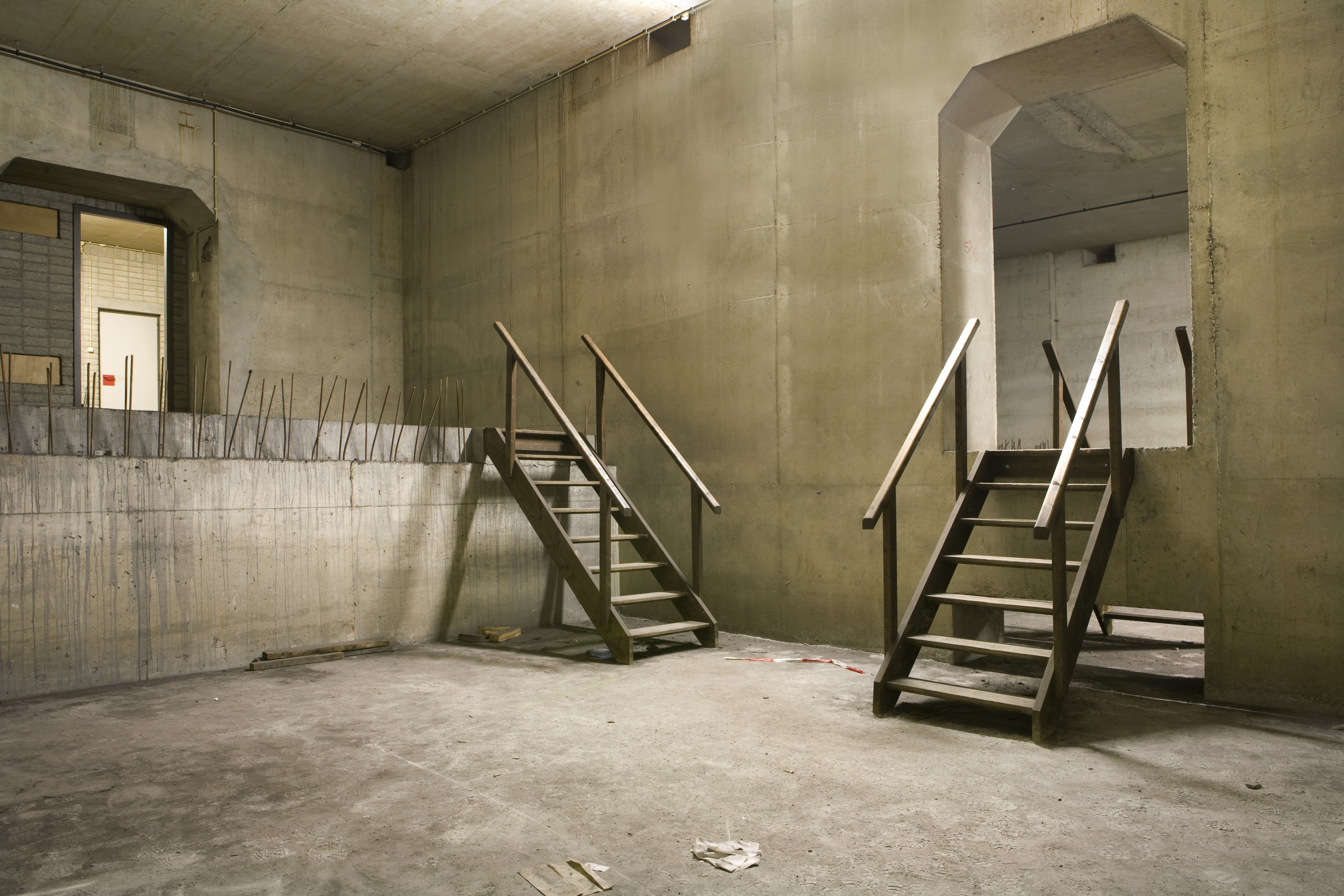
A part of the unused section

In Weesperplein, planners had to consider the possibility of an additional East–West Line. Since the second line was almost guaranteed to be built at the time, the decision was made to start work on the bottom platform in advance as building it afterwards would have been too complicated. An extra area below the platform used by the East Line was created, which consisted of large open areas made out of concrete. This area only had the space to fit in an island platform, as columns supporting the entire station structure above limited the size of the tunnel. There would have been an extra track connecting the two lines. In the original plan, the line going through the bottom would partially run under some of the houses at Weesperplein, which would have been demolished if the line was actually built. This also coincided with the plan to widen the street above for cars.

After the East–West Line was cancelled by the municipality on 19 March 1975, the area was converted to be used as a fallout shelter. The whole station has a capacity to house up to 12,000 people, 5,000 of them inside the shelter. The shelter included beds, water tanks, and garbage chutes for disposing of radioactive clothing. There are showering areas at the very bottom with bulkheads, but the shower heads and disposal systems were removed later. The doors are watertight and undergo annual testing to ensure functionality. Public shelters in Amsterdam, including the shelter at Weesperplein, were not maintained from 1999 onwards. In 2004, the equipment was removed to make way for smoke extraction machinery in case of a fire. The former shelter can be accessed via sliding doors at the top level of the station.

== History ==
=== Background ===
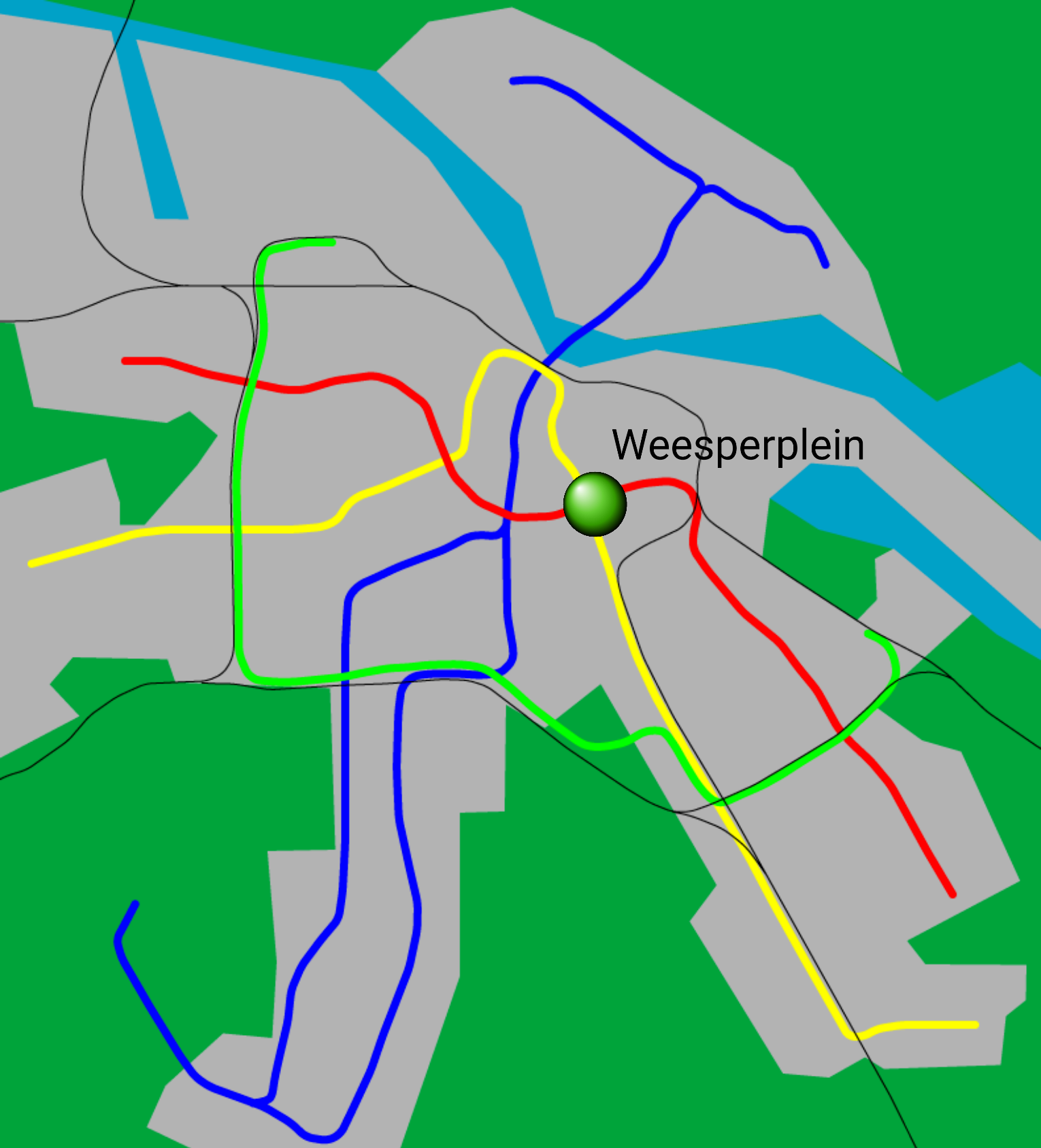
Weesperplein in the original plan

The Bureau Stadsspoor (City Rail Bureau) was formed in 1963 following a 1960 report and concluded that Amsterdam needed a new rail system to move large numbers of people. The bureau released five reports by 1966 and laid out a final plan for a total of four metro lines in the city, which was presented to the public in the same year during a press conference by alderman Roel de Wit. The plan included two East–West lines, one from Osdorp to East Bijlmermeer and the other from Geuzenveld to Bijlmermeer via Amsterdam Centraal. These lines would intersect each other twice: at Looiersgracht and at Weesperplein. The two lines were given priority and were designated as the first phase of the project because they would serve the neighbourhood of Bijlmermeer. This neighbourhood was still in development at the time, with the planned metro playing a pivotal role in its design.

The municipal council and the mayor of Amsterdam came together in April 1968 to debate on the metro. A month later, the council approved the plans based on the advice of the bureau and reserved 5 million Dutch guilder for the design of the eastern branches of the two East–West lines. Expectations were that the lines would be running within five years and that the total cost would be around 250 million guilder. The Dutch Government agreed to fund half of the project in February 1970 and compensate for eventual cost overruns related to workers wages. Shortly after construction started, it became clear that the initial budget would be overrun, and the estimated cost had increased to over 800 million guilder by 1972.

=== Construction ===
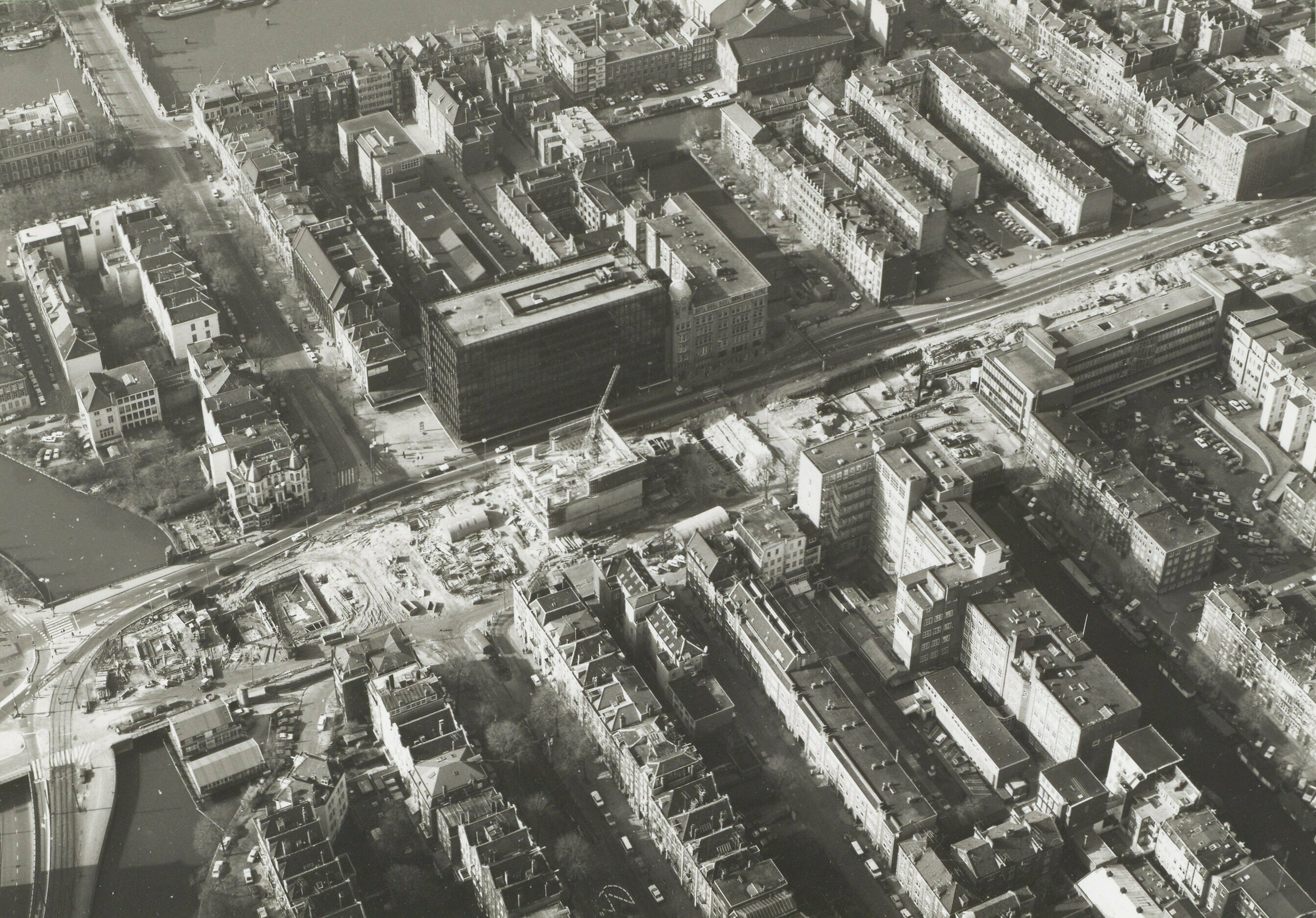
An aerial photo showing a caisson of the station being built

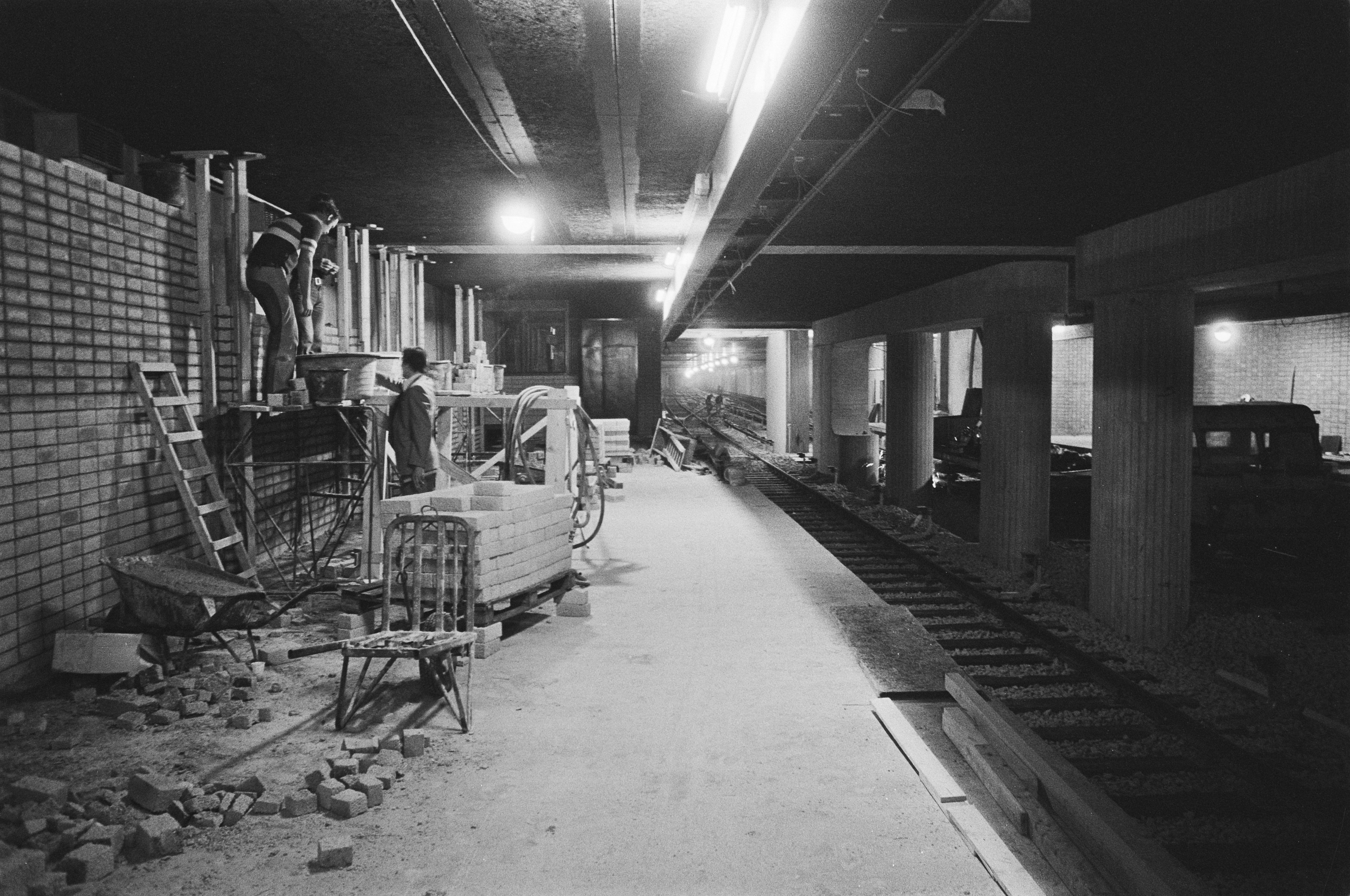
The platform during its construction

Weesperplein was the first Amsterdam Metro station to begin construction, with work commencing in August 1970. It was expected to take 4 to 5 years to finish the station. Most underground areas of the metro line were constructed by using caissons, which made pumping out groundwater unnecessary. The caissons were built above ground on-site, and generally had a length of 40 metres (130 ft) and a width of 10–18 metres (33–59 ft). At Weesperplein these were 40 metres wide, even wider than those at Amsterdam Centraal, which were 30 metres (98 ft). The earth below the caissons was rinsed with water and pumped out, allowing the caissons to be lowered into place.

There were protests against the construction of the metro near Nieuwmarkt, as this method required the demolition of the houses above the line. While the construction near Weesperplein was not an issue, a tram stop with multiple amenities dating back to 1923 had to be destroyed for the metro. The protests eventually led to the cancellation of all other lines in the plan, while the two East–West lines already under construction were scaled back to just the eastern part of the city. During the process of digging the station, two former freshwater storage basements were found. In the city centre of Amsterdam within the Singelgracht are 33 of these basements, but not much is known of them as they have not been in use since the mid-19th century. Some of the foundation and a turntable belonging to the former Weesperpoort railway station, which was located just next to the site of Weesperplein from 1843 to 1939, were also found during the construction of the tunnel nearby. The station was reported to be almost complete by June 1974; operations were expected to start years later.

=== Opening and early years ===
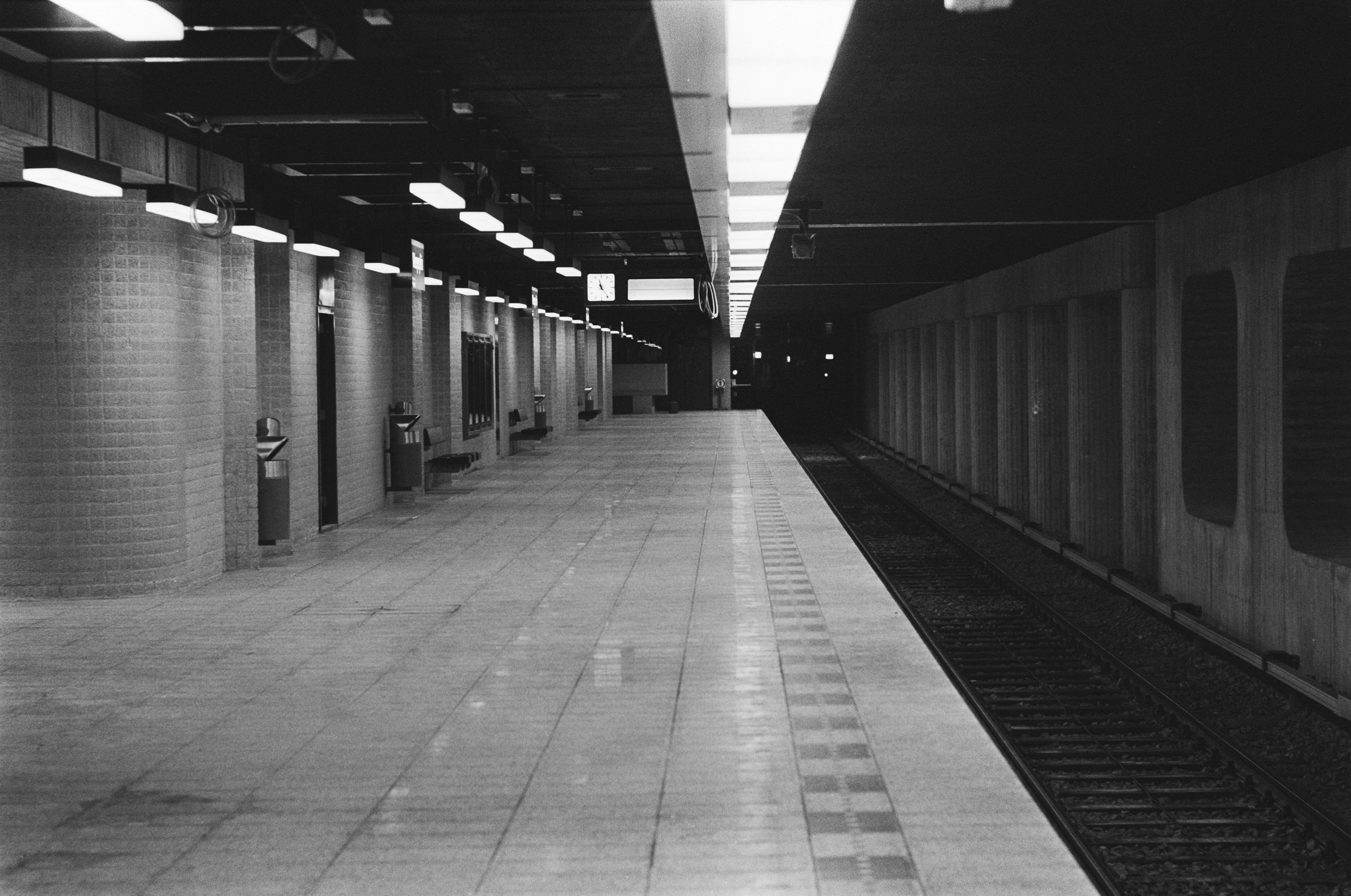
The platform six days before opening

A train was first rolled into the underground tunnels by the GVB on 25 January 1977, and mayor Ivo Samkalden drove the metro under supervision. The section from Weesperplein to Amsterdam Centraal was not completed yet at the time. Before the public opening, journalists and members of the municipal council were given a ride from Amsterdam Amstel to Weesperplein. Testing of regular metro operations started in late August 1977, after training of staff was completed. The metro line, including Weesperplein station, opened to the public on 16 October. For the first few years, Weesperplein was the terminus of the system: trains that came into the station were turned around with a switch that was located just after the station and ran the other direction towards Bijlmermeer. At Bijlmermeer the line split into two, one line ending at Gaasperplas and the other at Holendrecht. The section towards Centraal station was opened later on 11 October 1980 and Weesperplein was no longer a terminus for the two lines. Braille patterns were installed on the handrails at the station in 1984 to assist blind and visually impaired people. A lot of raw concrete was visible in the original brutalist architecture of the East Line stations. Most of the concrete in underground stations was later painted over with light coloured anti-graffiti coating in order to prevent vandalism.

In 1990, a tram-metro hybrid named sneltram (high-speed tram) started operations as line 51. Using special trains, the metro line would convert into a high-speed tram line at Amstelveen and run alongside regular trams. A high-speed tram caught fire at the Weesperplein station on 12 July 1999 due to a blocked disc brake. Although the tram was carrying no passengers at the time, the smoke coming from the fire caused all levels of the station to be evacuated. Two people were taken to hospital for smoke inhalation, but were discharged quickly after their injuries were determined to be minor.

=== 2010s ===
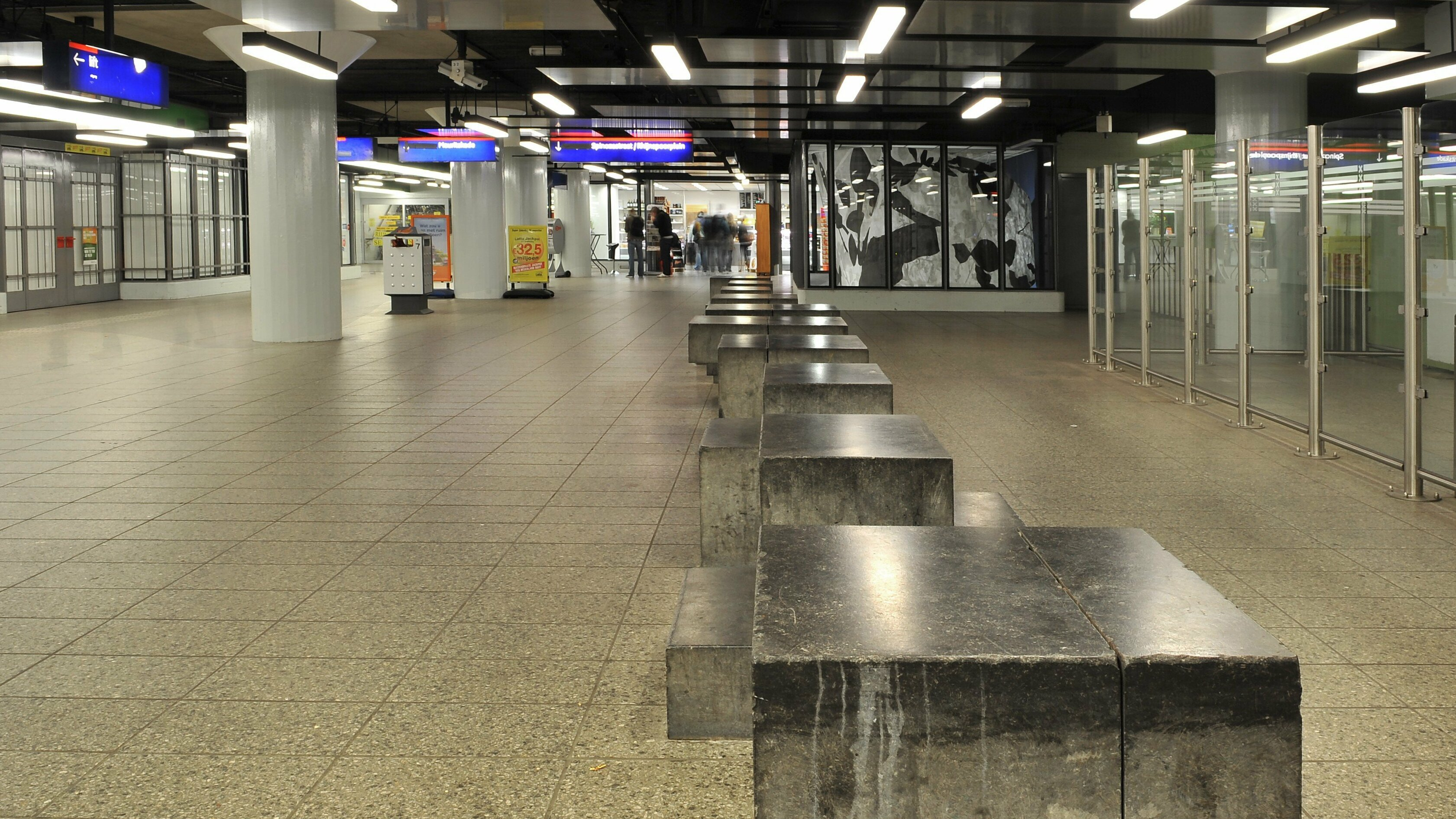
The station hall with bright anti-graffiti coating before the renovation

A 2010 report by a tunnel safety commission concluded that the evacuation capacity of Amsterdam Centraal and Weesperplein had to be increased for safety. An overhaul of the emergency exits and stairs, as well as the installation of audible and visible signage was necessary to achieve this. During the renovation a year later, asbestos was found in one of the emergency stairs, which halted metro operations at the station for an additional two months. An internal review of the renovation found that the quality of repairs fell short of standards and that these had to be redone regularly before being fully completed. In 2014, an exact replica of the station was built in Vught, North Brabant, to enable police, first aid, firefighting, and military personnel to train for emergency situations. GVB started to play music through the speakers of underground metro stations on the East Line in April 2017 as a trial to improve the experience of travellers. The type of music would depend on the time of day: slow and calming music during rush hours, and energetic music during the afternoon. After receiving mostly positive feedback, the practice of playing music was also expanded to the station of Line 52 in 2025.

For the first time since opening, a major renovation the East Line was started in 2016, where each station would be completely overhauled one by one. By the early part of the decade, the UvA and HvA had already announced that they were planning to expand their respective campusses, necessitating increased capacity at Weesperplein. The renovation of the station started in May 2017 with one of the entrances. The renovation was split into five phases to allow the station to be kept open, each phase taking three to four months. Concrete was replaced with glass to make it seem lighter and more spacious. As the payment gates located before the stairs from the hall to the platform frequently caused congestion on the platform due to passengers not being able to leave quickly, they were moved to the actual station entrances, creating one large central hall. A new elevator from the hall to the platforms was constructed, and the three existing ones were renovated. Two new staircases to the track level, one for each platform, was also built. The anti-graffiti coating was changed to light gray, resembling the original brutalist design of the station. Supply of new and disposal of old material was done by using the rails at night, when the Amsterdam Metro does not run. This was done to avoid creating traffic jams above ground. Walls were given smooth curves to direct passengers. The last entrance undergoing the renovation was opened in July 2018, finalizing the project.

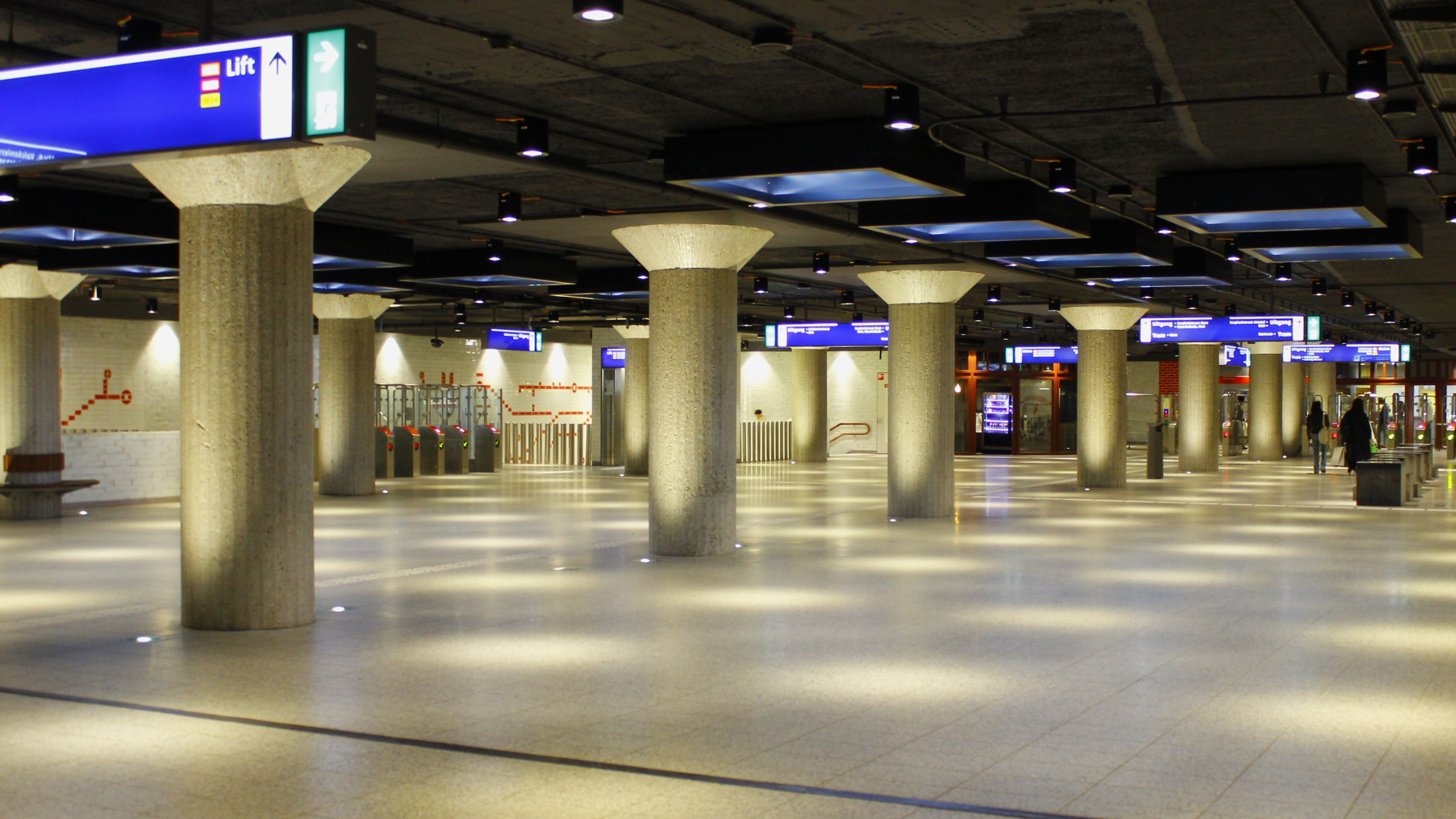
The station hall after renovation

Writing for Het Parool, Marc Kruyswijk commented that before the renovations, the station was a place "where you would prefer to spend as little time as possible," but after the renovation, it "suddenly looked as if it was not only a part of the past but also a part of the present". The same newspaper had previously called it an "underground labyrinth" where travellers had difficulties in finding the exits. In 2018, Het Parool reported that the station was already somewhat done in case a new East–West Line was planned. This would make Weesperplein a station where travellers could connect from one line to the other, as originally intended in the 1970s. Weesperplein was the third most used station of the Amsterdam Metro in 2023 with 32,264 passengers per day, only behind Amsterdam Centraal and Amsterdam Zuid, having overtaken Amsterdam Amstel and Amsterdam Bijlmer in 2022. This makes it the busiest station in the city without a connection to mainline trains of the Nederlandse Spoorwegen. In March 2024, dynamic passenger information system panels were installed near the entrances of the station hall. This was done as a part of a larger project to make the entire metro system more accessible.

== Artwork ==
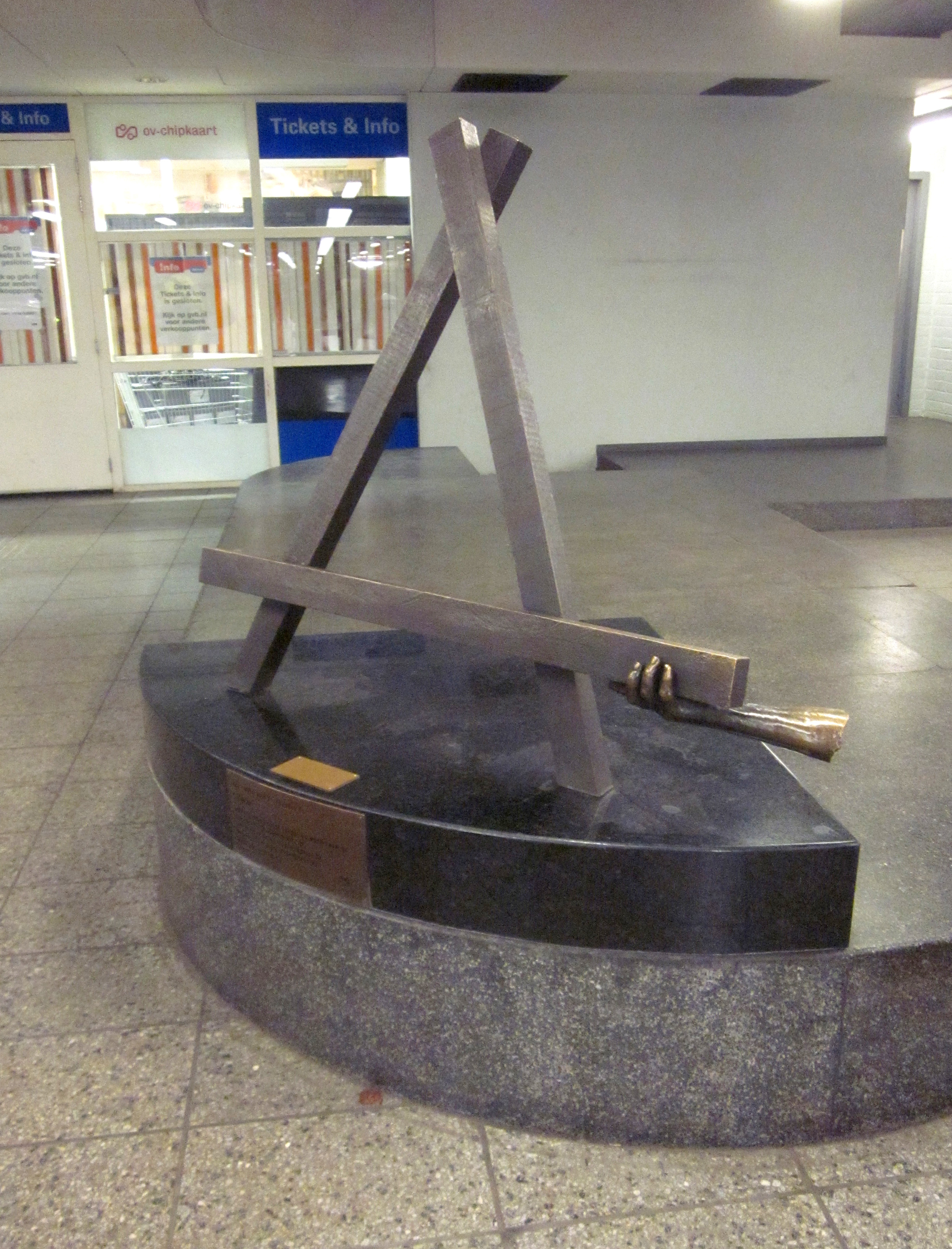
Signatuur van de anonieme arbeider photographed in 2013

Artists were invited to create artwork for most stations, but Weesperplein and Bijlmer station had a public competition where all Dutch artists were allowed to submit ideas. Of the 198 submissions, three were selected.

Luchtspiegelingen by Matthijs van Dam is composed of 12 panels showing Weesperstraat and Sarphatistraat seen from below. The view of roads, cars and clouds gives the illusion of looking up through the station to the outside. The panels were placed on the ceiling at platform level in 1977 and were removed in 2010 due to fire safety concerns. They were reinstalled eight years later, this time on the ceiling of the station hall. Verplaatsing by Charles Bergmans is ten square pieces of hard rocks. Located in the station hall, travelers could sit on them, which made their surfaces smooth and shiny over the years. Signatuur van de anonieme arbeider by Pieter Engels is three bronze beams forming the letter A. The beams symbolize the three groups that made the metro possible: Amsterdam, contractors and workers (Dutch: Amsterdam, aannemer en arbeider).

== Services ==
The station is served by metro lines 51, 53 and 54. North-bound, all three lines share the same route and terminate at Amsterdam Centraal. South-bound, M51 ends at Isolatorweg, M53 ends at Gaasperplas, and M54 ends at Gein. As of 2026, all lines run 6 trains per hour everyday, with the exception of the early morning and late evening when service is reduced to 4 trains per hour. Connections to the tram network of Amsterdam is available at this station, with a tram stop near the entrance of the metro station being served by lines 1, 7 and 19. Night bus N85 towards Centraal Station stops near the station at every night, with increased frequency during the weekend.
