= Wibautstraat metro station =

Metro station in Amsterdam

Wibautstraat
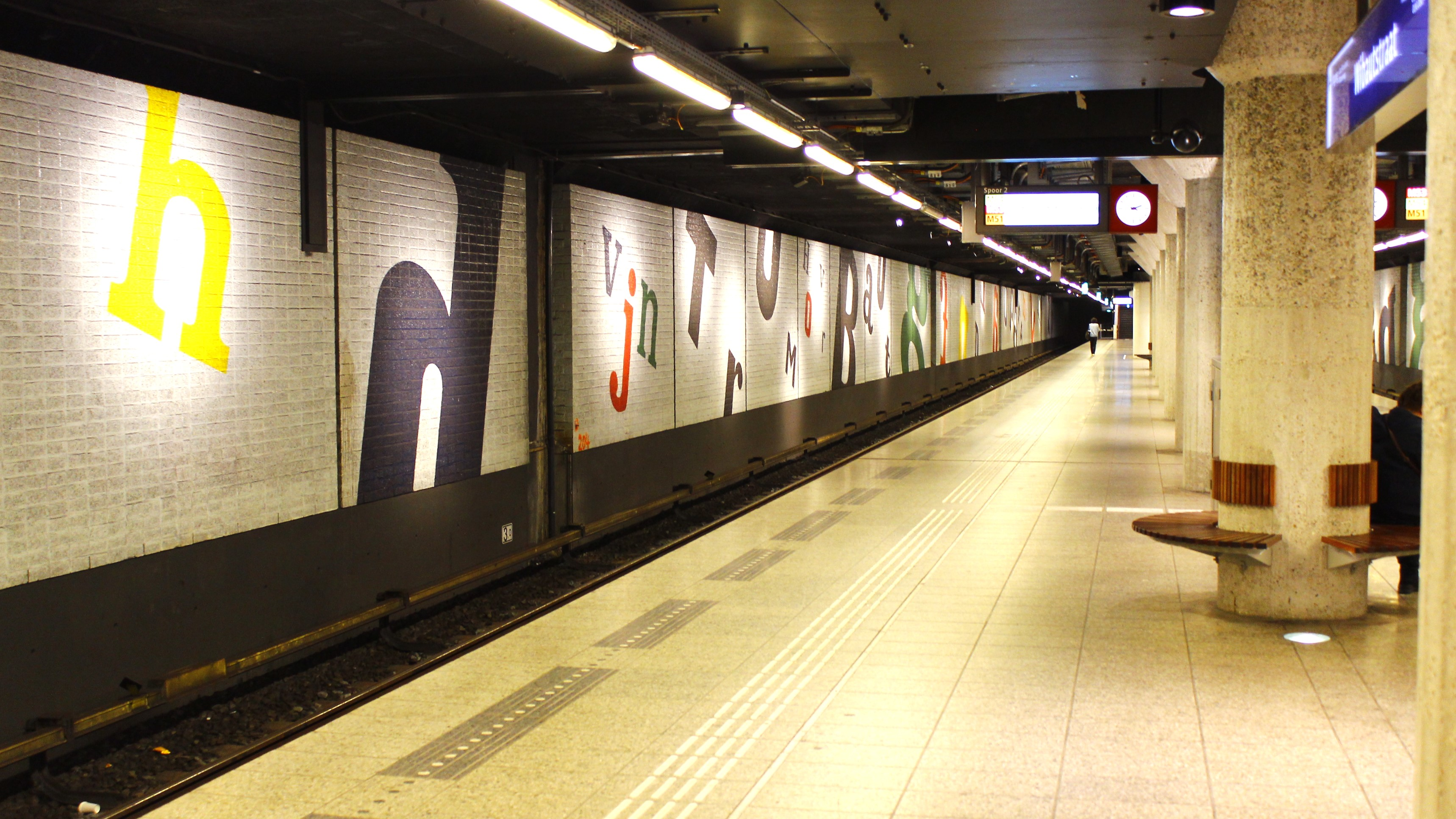

General information
- Location: Wibautstraat, Amsterdam; Netherlands
- Coordinates: 52°21′19″N 4°54′41″E
- Owner: Gemeente Vervoerbedrijf (GVB)
- Line: 51, 53, 54 (Metro)
- Platforms: 1
- Tracks: 2
- Connections: GVB tram: 3 GVB bus: N85, N86 (night)

Other information
- Fare zone: 5700 (Centrum)

History
- Opened: 16 October 1977
Location

Wibautstraat is an underground metro station in the city centre of Amsterdam, Netherlands. Served by metro lines 51, 53 and 54 of the Amsterdam Metro, the station was constructed with the cut-and-cover method. It was opened on 16 October 1977. The station consists of two station halls with two entrances each. The 155-metre-long (509 ft) island platform is between the two halls. The station was renovated in 2010 and 2018.

The five pieces of artwork inside the station created by a cartoonist refer to three major Dutch newspapers—de Volkskrant, Het Parool and Trouw—that had their offices at Wibautstraat and are considered to have cultural and historical value after the newspapers left the street to different locations.

== Layout ==
The station was designed by two architects from the Government of Amsterdam: Ben Spangberg and Sier van Rhijn. The station is located under the street which shares its name, next to a town square. There are two station halls 4 metres (13 ft) below surface, with a 155-metre-long (509 ft) island platform between them located 8 metres (26 ft) below surface. It has two entrances for the northern hall and two for the southern hall, with only the northern ones having elevators. Entrances of station were kept as small as possible due to the protests. The track between Wibautstraat and Amstel station is 725 metres (2,379 ft) long. 450 metres (1,480 ft) after leaving Wibautstraat, the metros leave the tunnel and come above ground. The station can be converted into a fallout shelter housing up to 3,000 people should it be necessary.

== History ==
=== Construction and opening ===
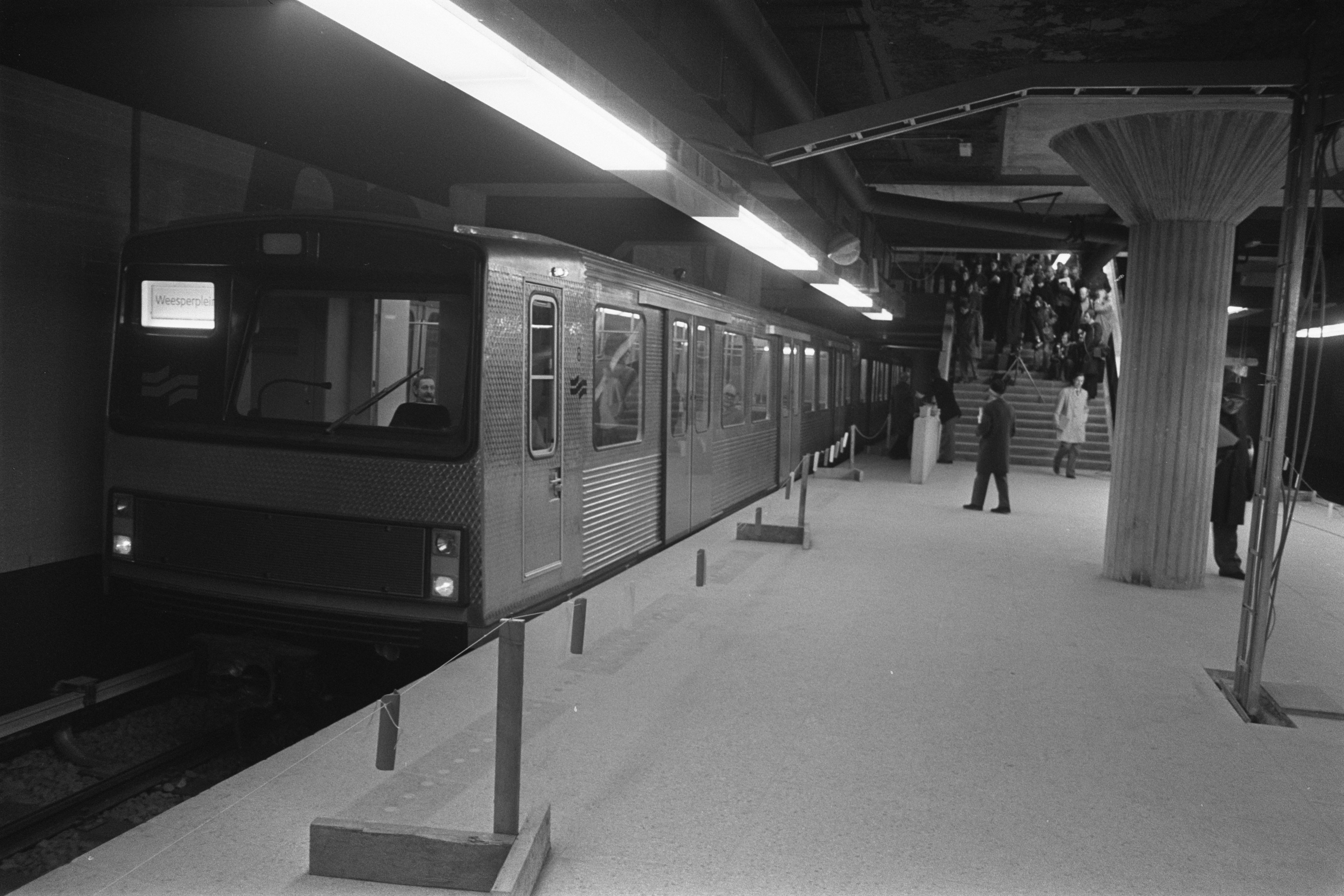
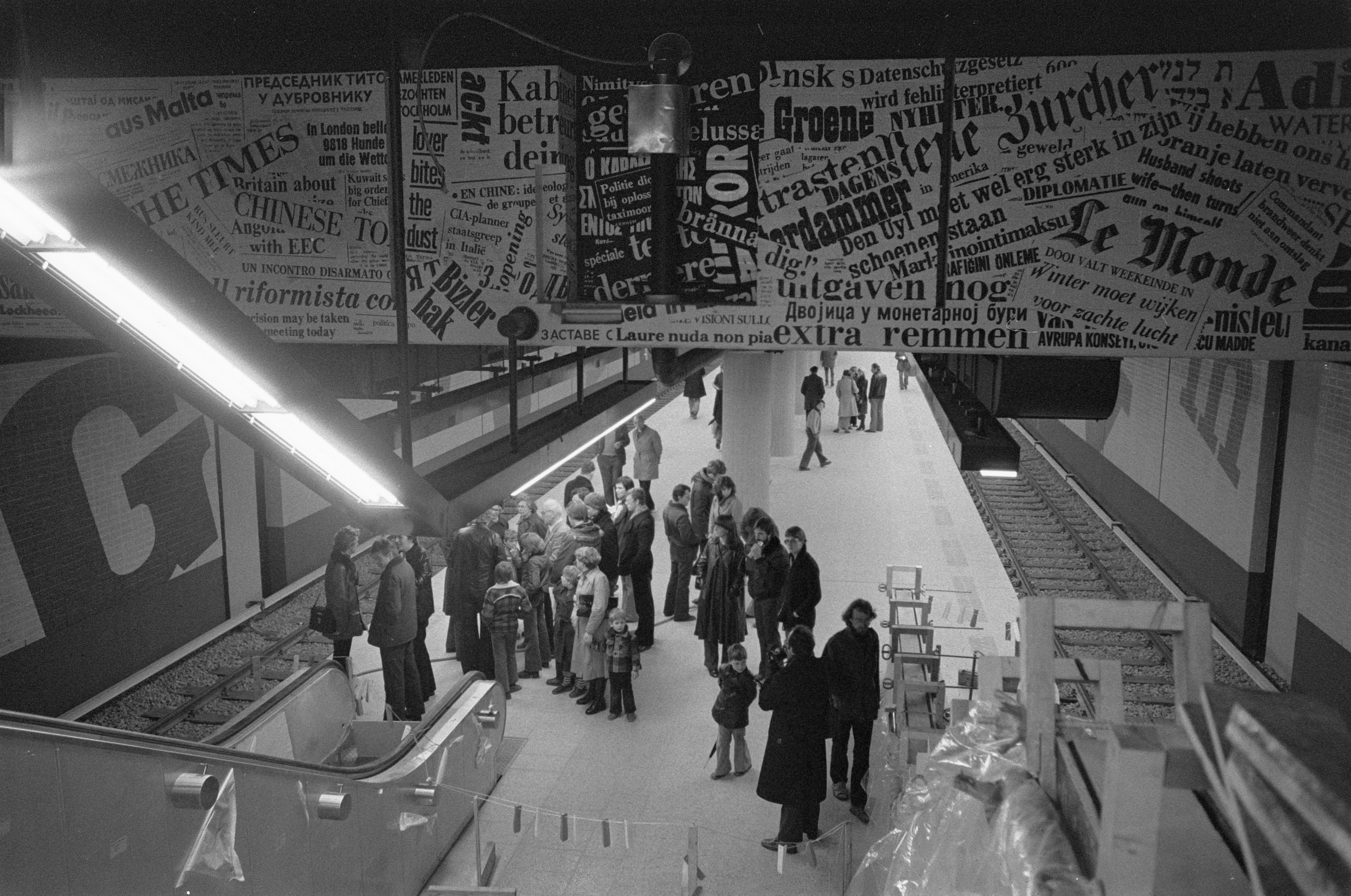
Photos taken during open days prior to opening, in February 1977 (left) and in April (right).

In a 1968 metro plan released by the information office of the municipality, the station was called Oosterparkstraat instead of Wibautstraat.

Most underground areas of the Amsterdam Metro were constructed by using 40-metre-long (130 ft) caissons. However, different from other stations, Wibautstraat station and the tunnels near it were constructed with the cut-and-cover method. The tunnel walls were created underground and immediately topped with a roof, allowing the roads above to be reconstructed again. This was done to relieve the busy traffic above the street. The soil below the roof was later excavated and the tunnel floor poured.

A metro was first rolled into the underground tunnels on 25 January 1977. Prior to public opening, journalists and members of the municipality council were given a ride from Amsterdam Amstel to Weesperplein. The regular metro operations were tested with 100 personnel in September 1977. The metro line, including Wibautstraat, opened to the public on 16 October.

=== Later developments ===
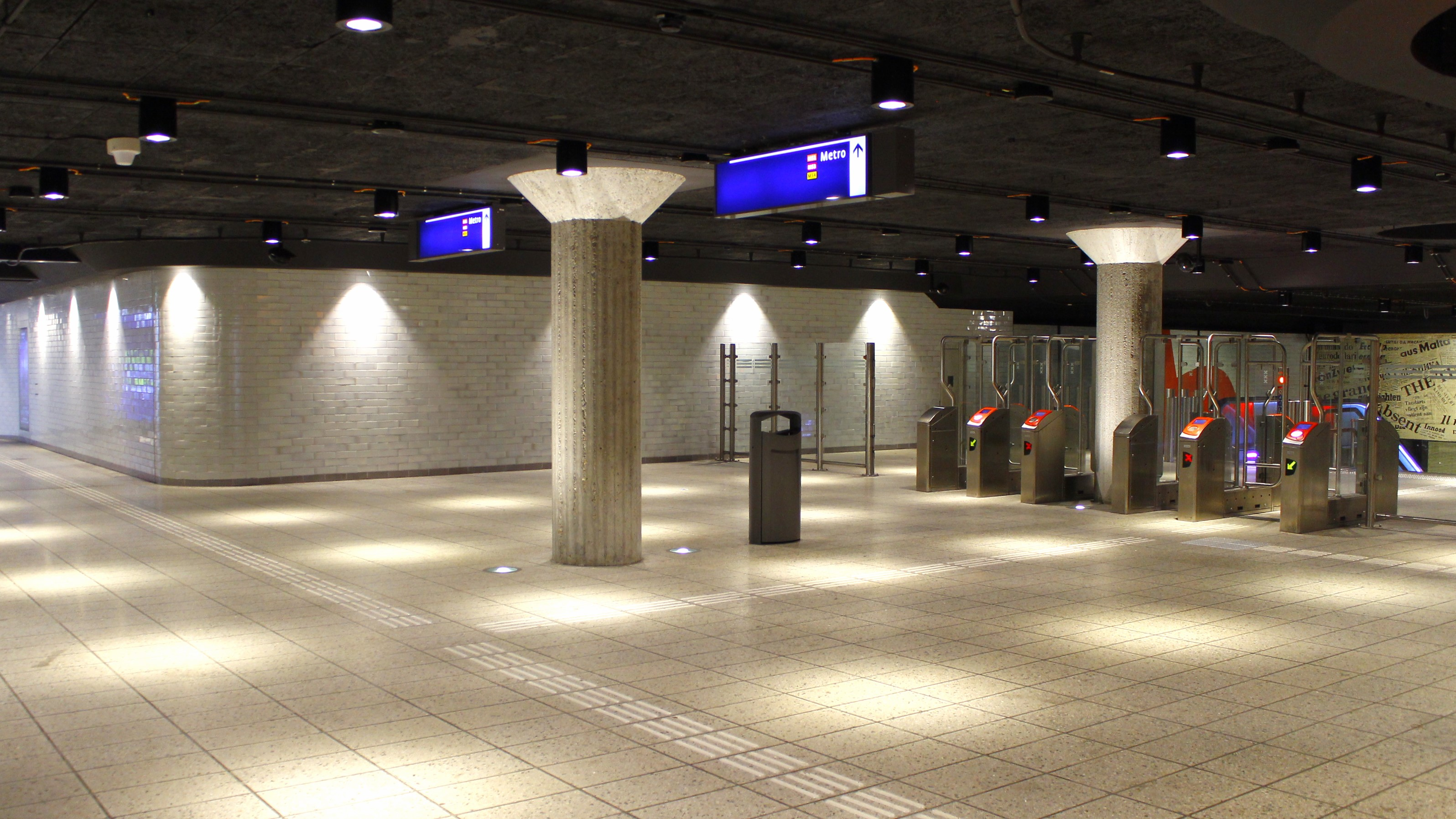
The northern entrance after renovation

A 2006 study on the fire safety of the Amsterdam Metro showed that in case of a fire at Wibautstraat, only 700 of the 1,700 people inside could safely escape. The station was temporarily closed as a result of these fire safety concerns.

In April 2017, the Gemeente Vervoerbedrijf (GVB) started to play music through the speakers of underground metro stations as a test. The type of music would depend on the time of day: slow and calming music during rush hours, and energetic music during the afternoon.

Stations on the East Line which were of poor quality were renovated in 2010. Another renovation of the stations was finished in 2018. The small entrances of the original design were enlarged. Voids with windows were created to allow daylight into the station. It was also intended to create a larger space above the stairs from the station halls to the platform, but this idea was called off when scans showed pipes and cables in the area. Walls were given smooth curves to "guide" passengers. Prior to the second renovation, the station was commonly used by drug addicts. The station and its surroundings, including the square above, have had trouble with drug addicts "for years", making the area feel unsafe for locals and passengers.

== Artwork ==
In the 1970s, three major Dutch newspapers—de Volkskrant, Het Parool and Trouw—had their offices at Wibautstraat. Rob Wout (pseudonym: Opland), a cartoonist for De Groene Amsterdammer and de Volkskrant, was asked to make "something journalistic" as artwork for the station.

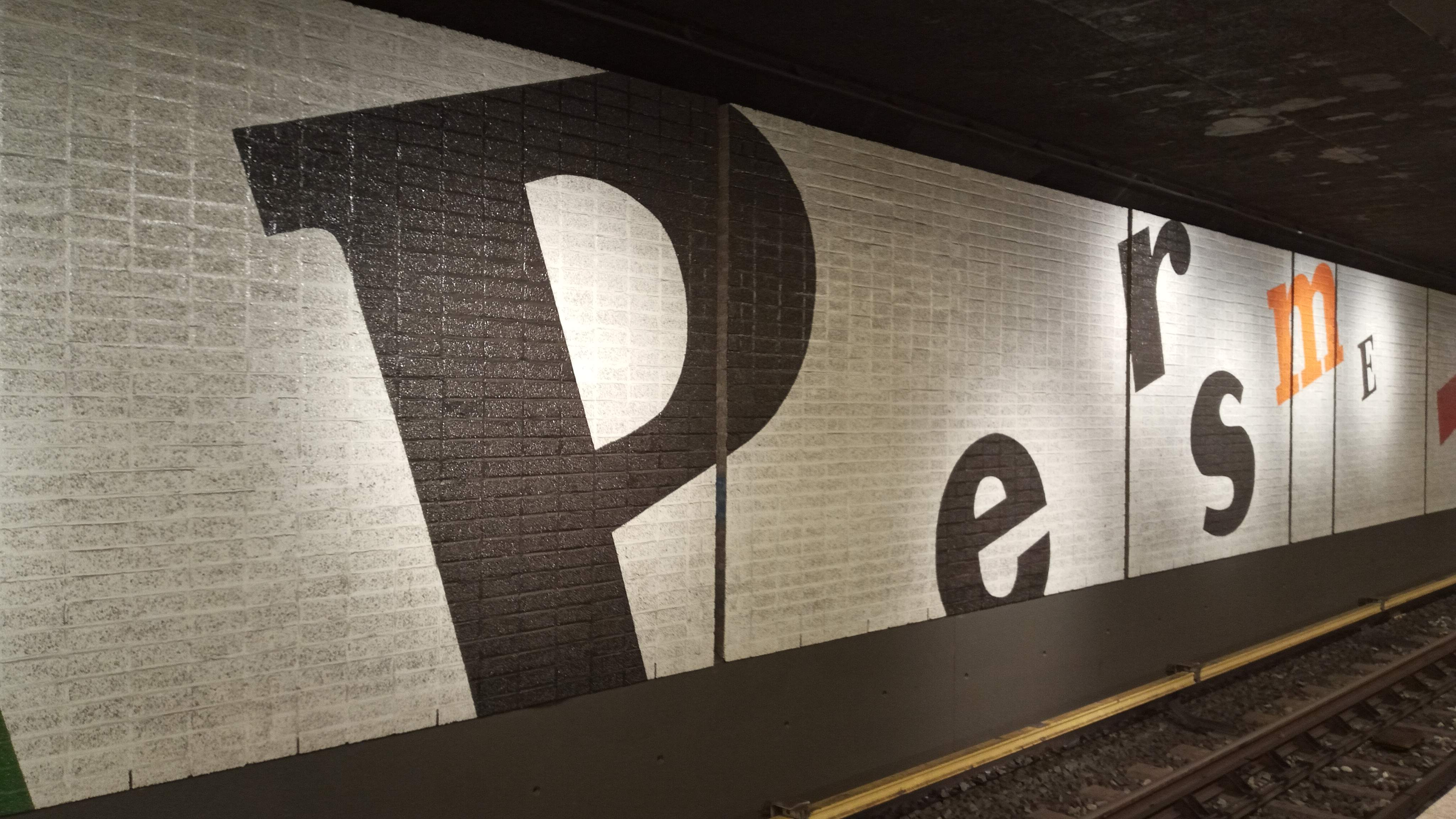
A section of the platform wall with the letters spelling "Pers", Dutch for press

Opland created five artworks for the station that together form a whole piece. The letters on the platform walls are "falling" on the pages of a newspaper. One of the concrete pillars on the platform has the front pages of newspapers visible and acts like matrixes. Above the staircase from the northern hall leading to the platform are headlines of international newspapers, while above the staircase from the southern hall there is a photograph of a nineteenth-century street repeating itself eight times to create an abstract image. There are schematic drawings of printing presses in a void above the track, which are reminiscent of the cartoons for which the artist was known. Despite the relocation of all three newspapers that inspired the artwork, it remains and is considered to have cultural and historical value.

In February 2017, an unofficial portrait of Eberhard van der Laan, then Mayor of Amsterdam, was painted near one of the entrances of the station after it was announced that he had an illness. GVB said that the portrait was allowed to stay, but it was accidentally removed a month later by a cleaner who was unaware of the exception made for the artwork. It was decided to not repaint the portrait.

== Services ==
The station is served by metro lines 51, 53 and 54. Northbound, all three lines use the same track and end at Amsterdam Centraal. Southbound, M53 ends at Gaasperplas, while M54 ends at Gein. M51 used to serve the Amstelveen suburb by heading south after Amsterdam Zuid station and ended at Westwijk. The section after Zuid was closed in 2019 and replaced by a tramline. M51 now continues westbound after Zuid and ends at Isolatorweg. A tram stop near the entrance shares the same name as the metro station and is served by tram line 3 during the day. At night, night buses N85 and N86 stop near the station.

Preceding station	Amsterdam Metro	Following station
Weesperplein towards Centraal Station	Line 51	Station Amstel towards Isolatorweg
Weesperplein towards Centraal Station	Line 53	Station Amstel towards Gaasperplas
Weesperplein towards Centraal Station	Line 54	Station Amstel towards Gein
