= Amsterdam Weesperpoort station =

Former railway station in Amsterdam

Amsterdam Weesperpoort
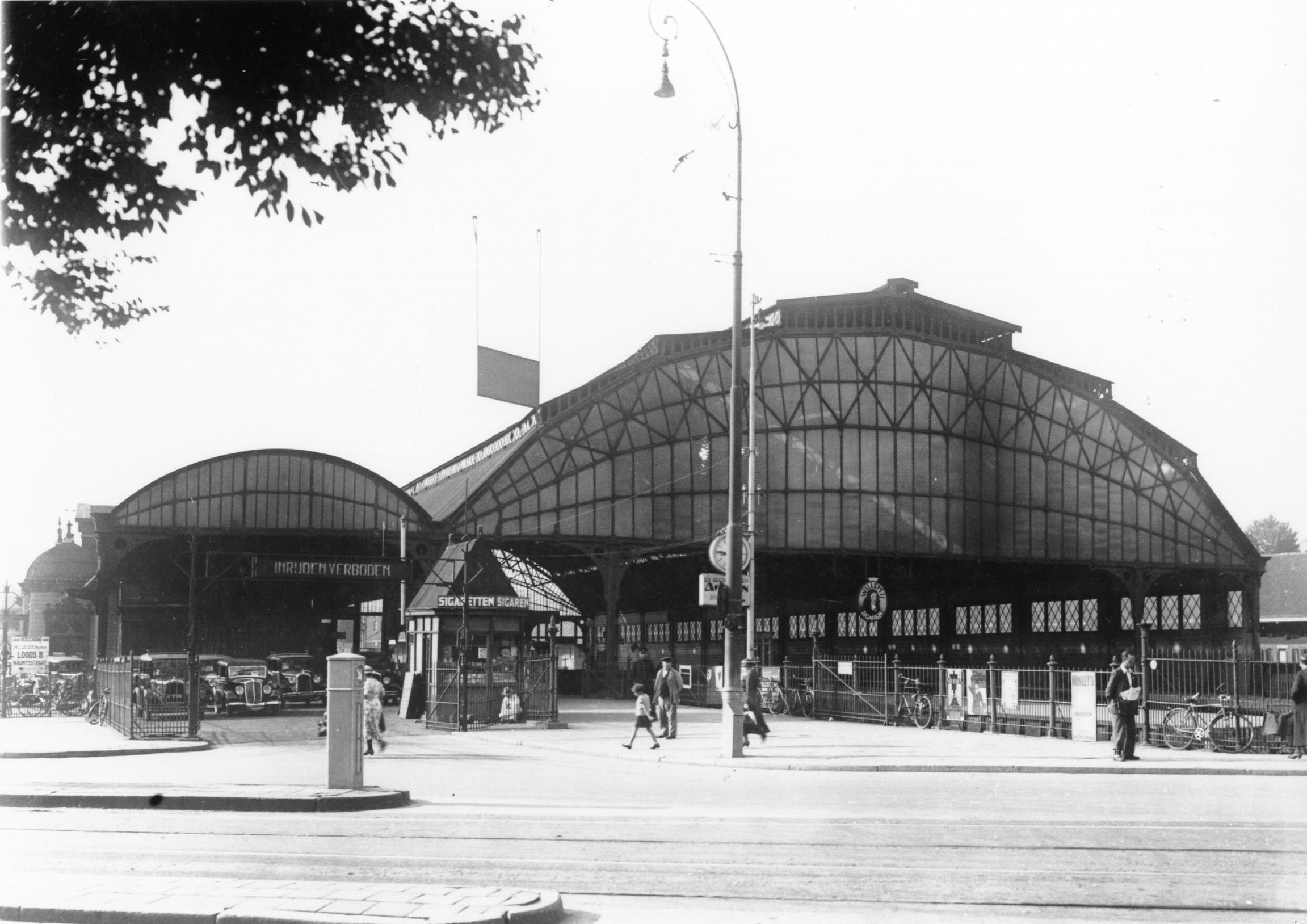
- The station in the 1930s

General information
- Coordinates: 52°21′36″N 4°54′31″E
- Line: Amsterdam–Arnhem railway

History
- Opened: 28 December 1843
- Closed: 14 October 1939
Location
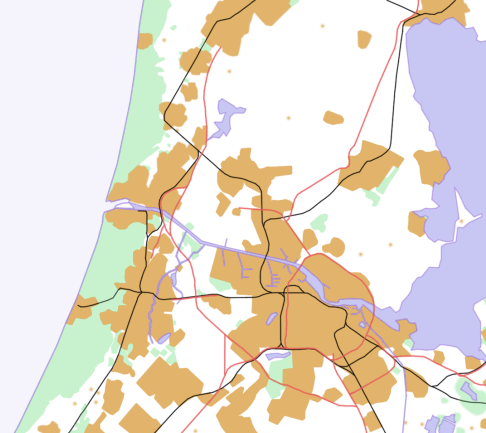
- Location within Northern Randstad Location within Netherlands

Weesperpoort (Dutch: Weesperpoortstation) was a railway station in Amsterdam, the Netherlands. It opened in 1843 as the terminus station in Amsterdam of the railway line to Utrecht and Arnhem. Over the years, the station was expanded as new services started, including international trains and a tram to the Gooi. Weesperpoort was no longer the terminus in Amsterdam from 1889 onwards; trains coming into the station would reverse and continue to the newly built Amsterdam Centraal station. The station was closed in 1939 after it became obsolete with the opening of the Amstel station nearby, with its demolition taking place soon after.

== History ==
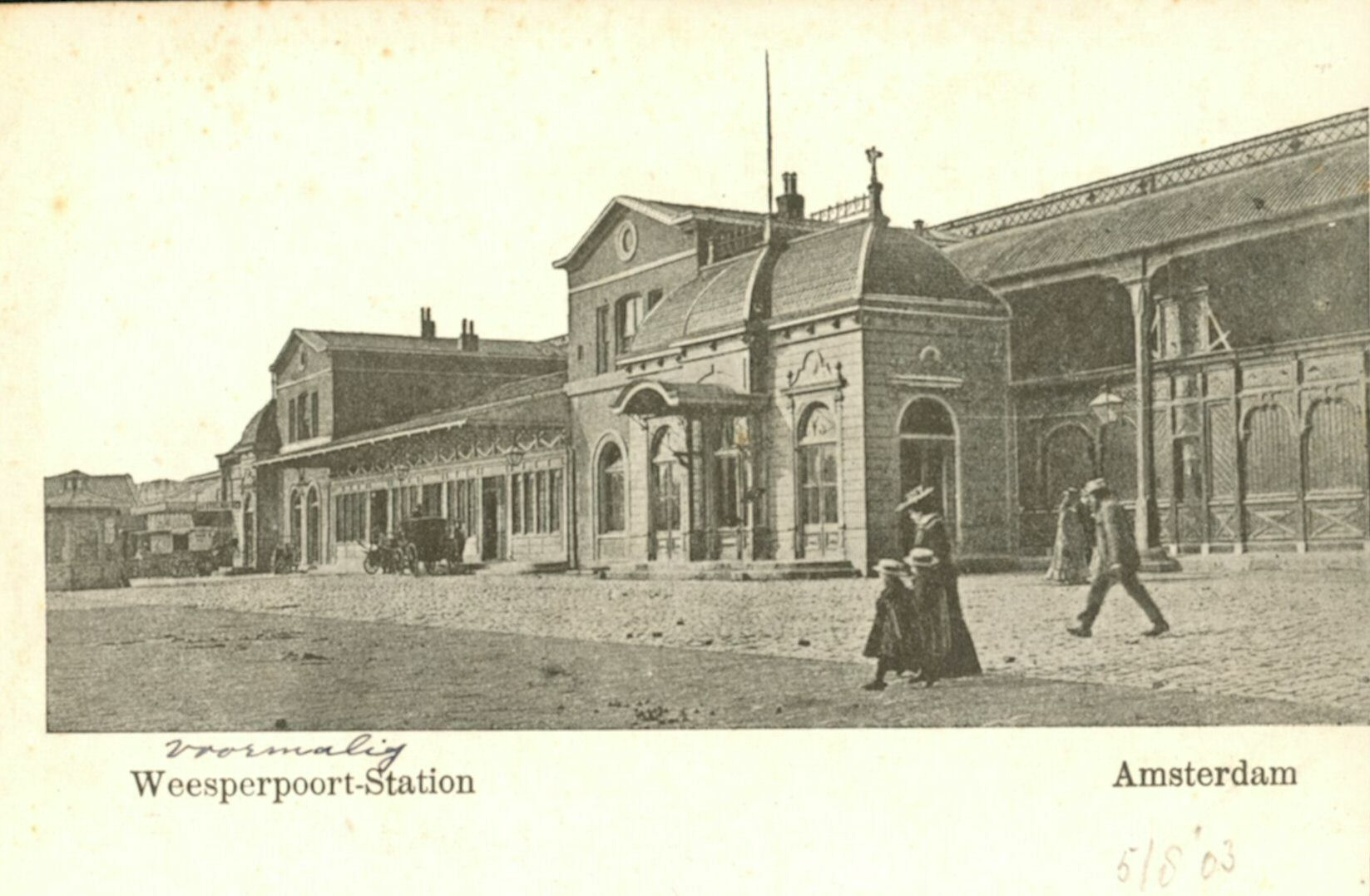
Station building (c. 1900)

Prior to the construction of the station, there was a city gate (Dutch: poort) of Amsterdam at the location named Weesperpoort.

Plans for a railway line to Arnhem were finalized in 1836 where Weesperpoort would be the terminus station of line in Amsterdam. This line would be funded by the Dutch state to eventually create a railway connection with Cologne, but was strongly opposed by the House of Representatives. However, the decision of the house was overruled by King William II and construction started after funds were allocated to the project in 1838. The first phase from Amsterdam to Utrecht opened on 28 December 1843, followed by the extension to Arnhem on 14 May 1845. The station served four trains a day to Utrecht, three of which would continue to Arnhem. Trains were run by the Nederlandsche Rhijnspoorweg-Maatschappij, which after several mergers would become the Nederlandse Spoorwegen in 1938.

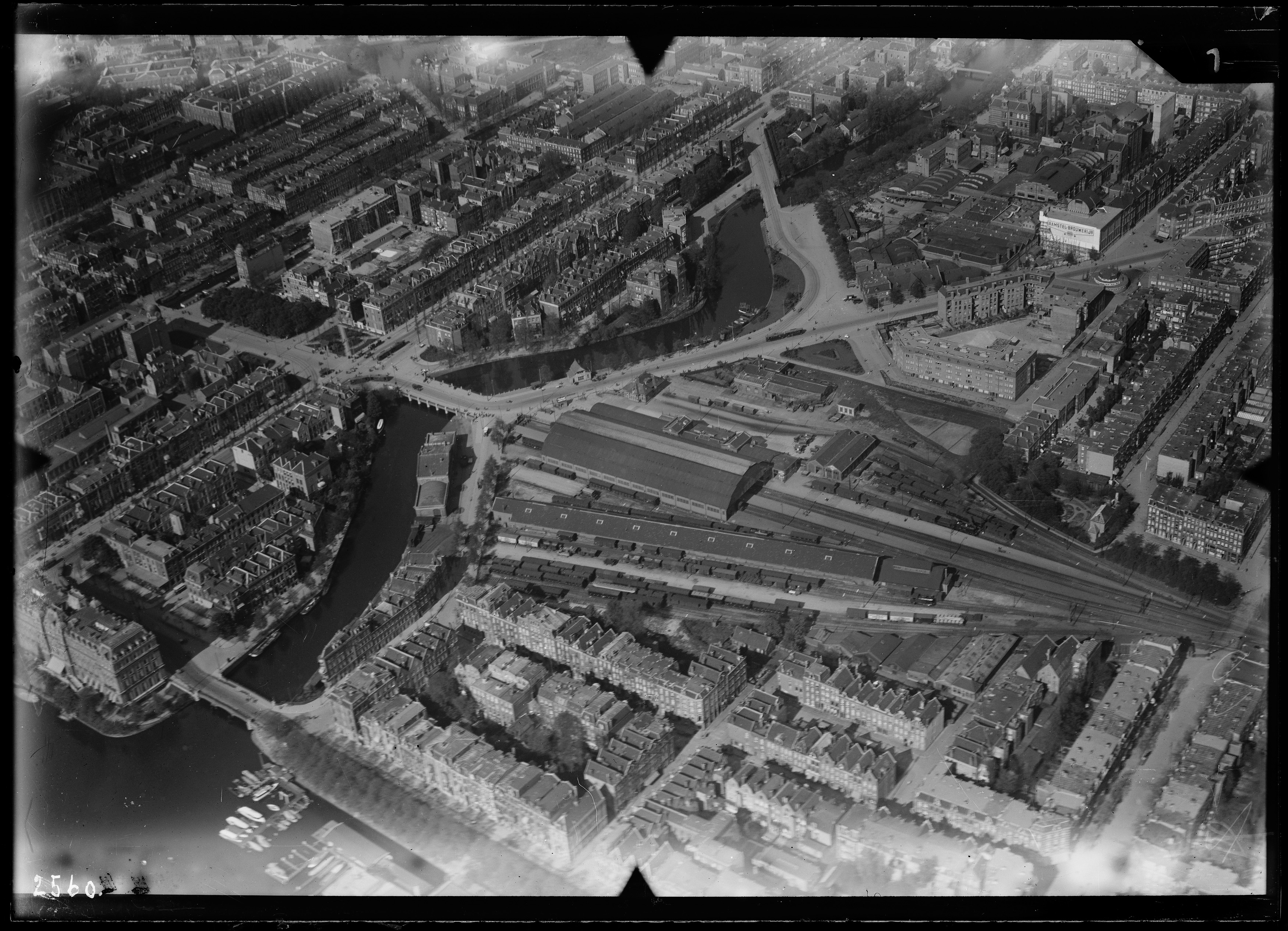
The station and its surroundings in the final decades

In the early years, the station was simple and consisted of two buildings: one for departing passengers and one for arriving. The tracks were laid in broad-gauge, but this was changed to standard-gauge in 1852 to be more in line with other European countries. This also enabled the extension to Cologne; the first international train departed the station on 20 October 1856. Weesperpoort grew in importance for passenger and freight traffic with this connection. The following decade, new routes to Rotterdam and The Hague were introduced. The station was renovated and expanded continuously throughout the years. The arrival building was demolished to make way for a larger yard. In 1863, a steel station shed was built for the platforms. From 1881 onwards, the station was also the terminus of the tram to the Gooi.

After Amsterdam Centraal station was opened in 1889, trains from Utrecht and beyond would arrive at Weesperpoort, reverse direction, and continue to Centraal via a new connection to the Amsterdam–Zutphen railway.

== Closure ==
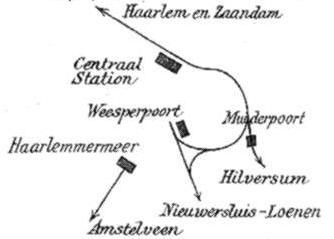
The stations in Amsterdam in 1936. Amstel station opened 3 years later, just south of the triangle junction, eliminating the need of reversing at Weesperpoort.

In the 1930s, railway lines going through the Eastern part of Amsterdam were elevated with bridges and viaducts, eliminating almost all level crossings in the area. A new station was built near the Berlagebrug, which would replace the Weesperpoort station. On 13 October 1939, the new Amsterdam Amstel station opened 1.5 kilometres (0.93 mi) away from Weesperpoort. The Weesperpoort station became obsolete with the new station and the change in track layout due to the reconstructions that took place in earlier years. The final train departed Weesperpoort on 14 October. Demolition of the station and rails started by December; the station shed was completely removed at the end of March 1940, followed by the former tram stop in May.

A few years after the closure, three sculptures dedicated to the city gate and station, both now demolished, were made by sculptor Hildo Krop and placed on the Weesperpoort Bridge. The art piece for the former station was designed by Piet Kramer and depicted three important moments in Dutch railway history: De Arend (1839), one of the first Dutch locomotives, ZHESM rolling stock (1908), the first electric train in the Netherlands, and the Mat '34 (1934), the first diesel multiple units of the country.

In 1970, construction work for the underground Weesperplein station of the Amsterdam Metro started next to the former railway station. Some of the old foundation and a turntable belonging to the former station was found during works. The metro station opened in October 1977 and initially was the terminus of all metro lines in the city until the section to Amsterdam Centraal was completed in 1980.

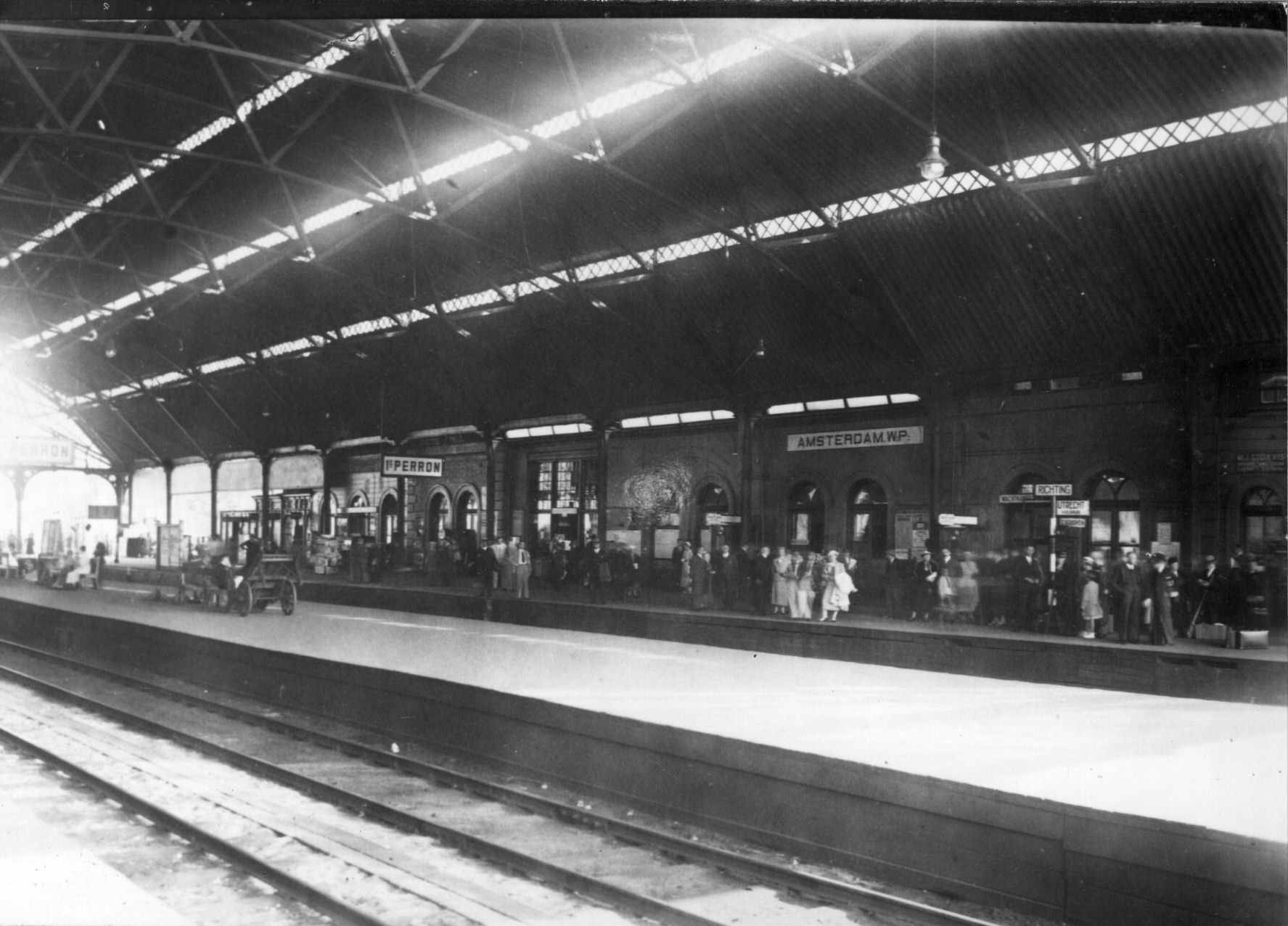
Platforms of the station

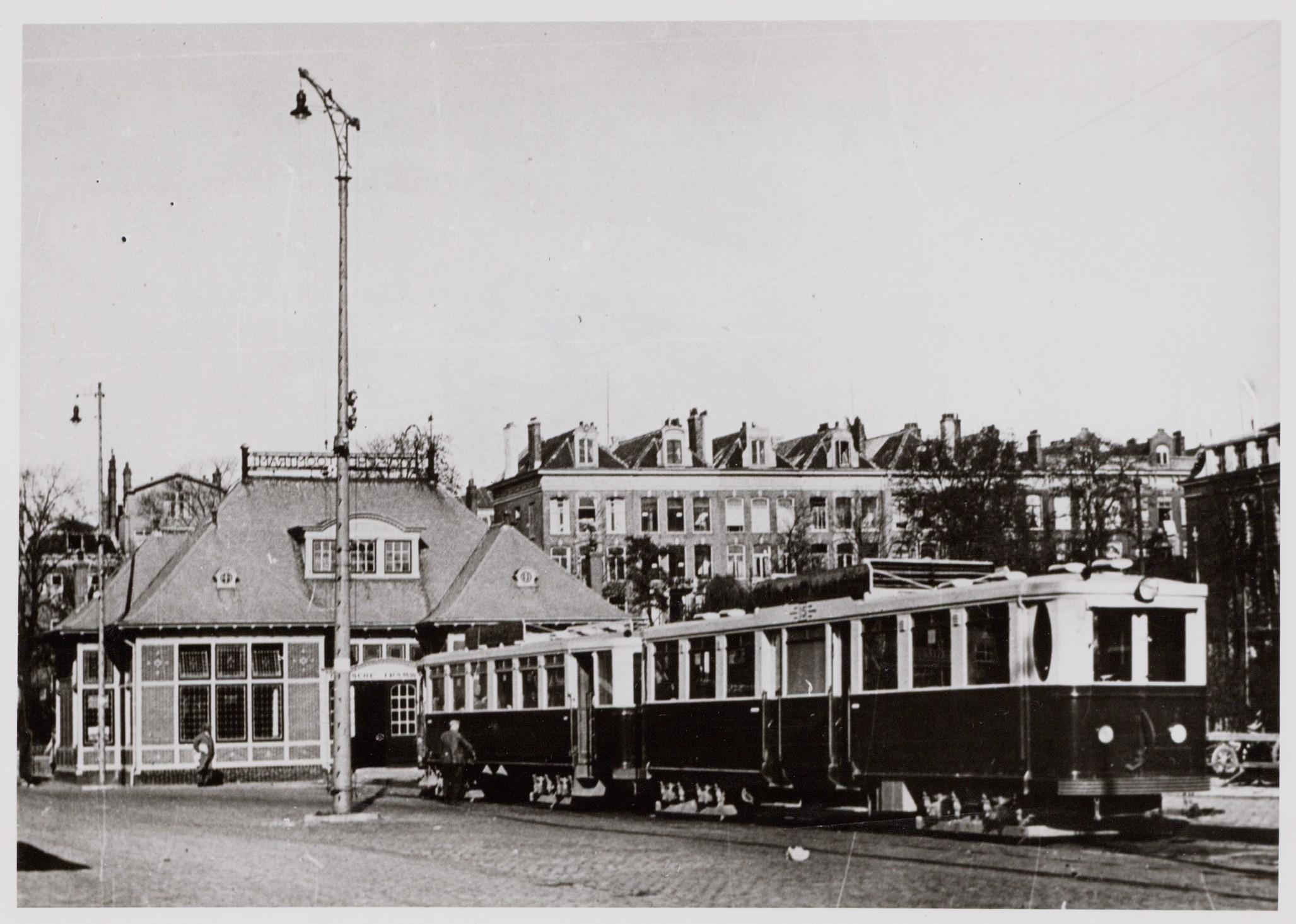
Tram to the Gooi leaving the stop just outside the station in 1936

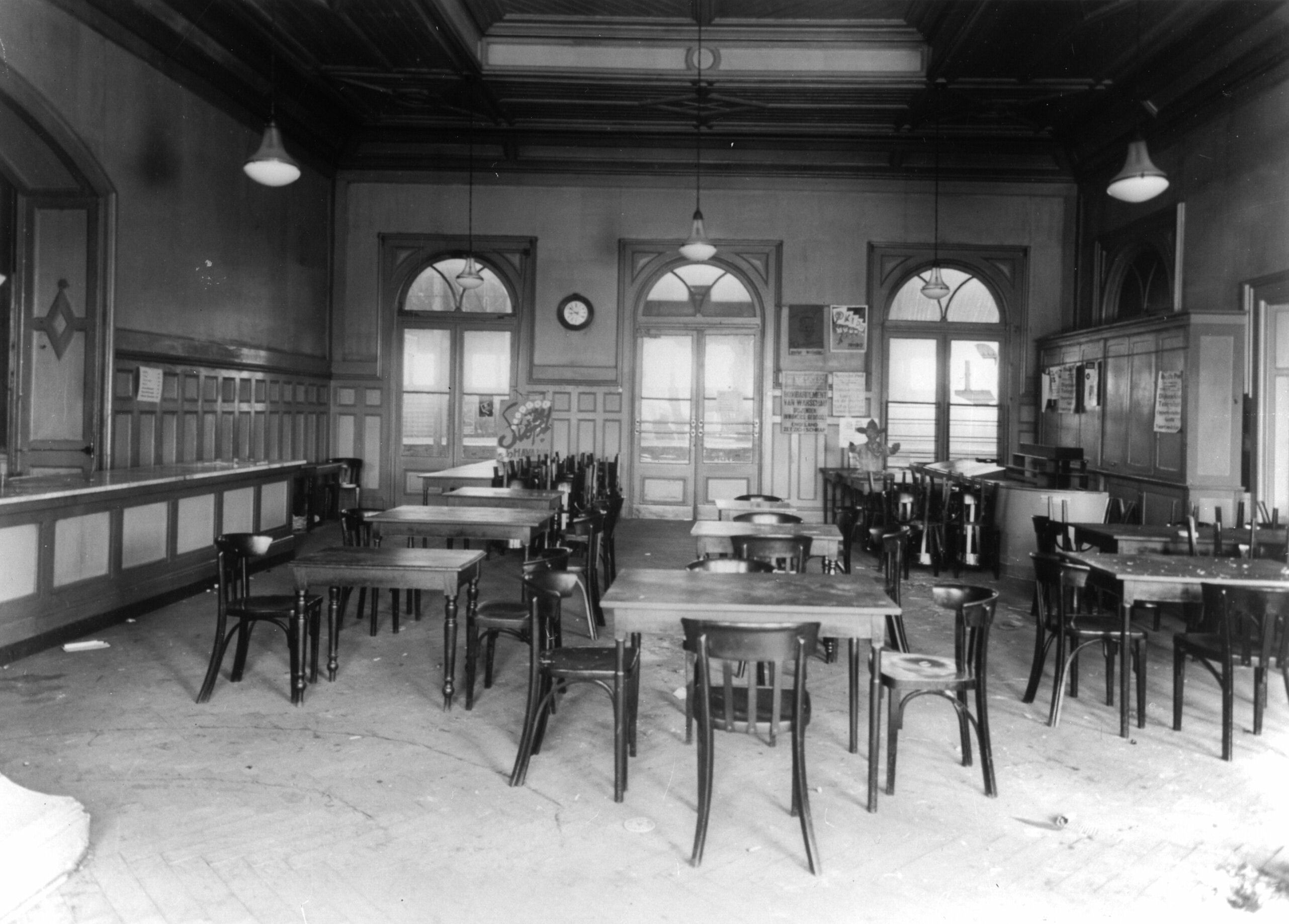
Waiting room inside the station

The station being demolished in 1940

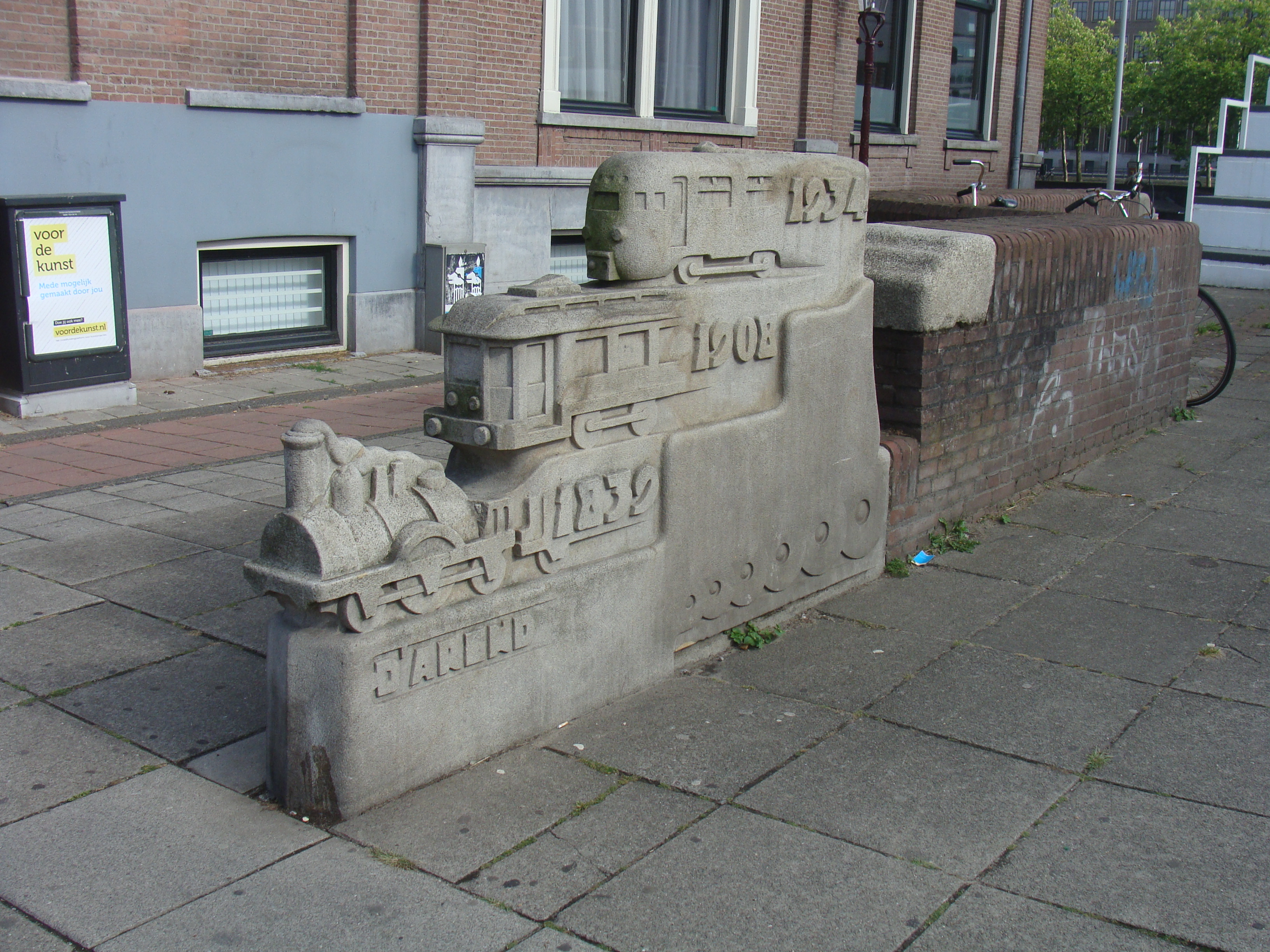
Sculpture depicting 3 of the earliest Dutch trains
