= Amsterdam regional transport authority =

Group of 14 municipalities in North Holland

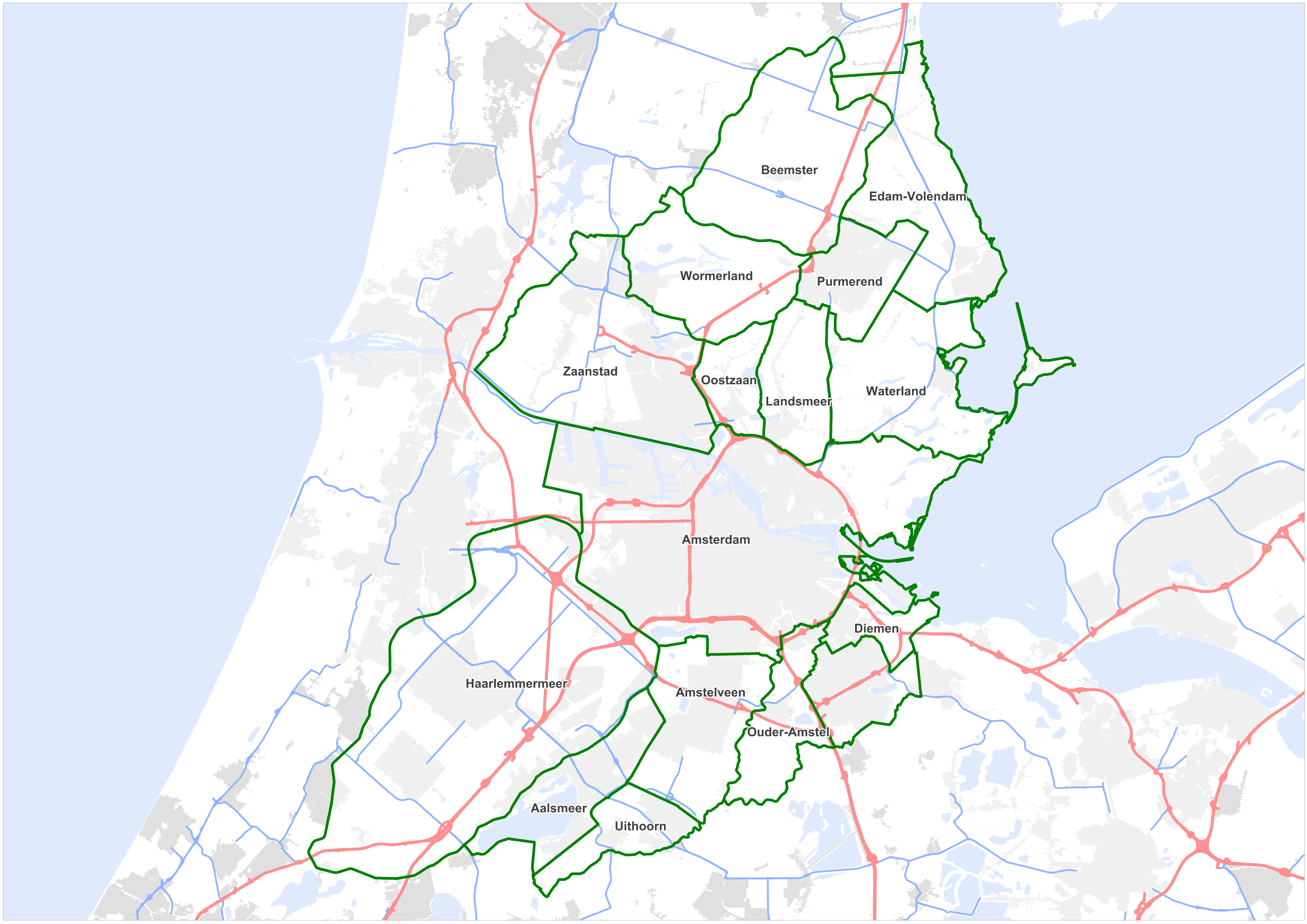
Amsterdam regional transport authority

The Amsterdam regional transport authority (Dutch: Vervoerregio Amsterdam) is an administrative partnership of 14 municipalities in the province of North Holland, comprising and located around Amsterdam. It was called the City Region of Amsterdam (Dutch: Stadsregio Amsterdam) until 31 December 2016.

== Number of inhabitants per municipality ==
Municipality	Inhabitants
Amsterdam	941.927
Haarlemmermeer	166.978
Zaanstad	165.201
Amstelveen	95.840
Purmerend	96.182
Edam-Volendam	37.126
Aalsmeer	33.459
Diemen	33.327
Uithoorn	32.204
Waterland	17.721
Wormerland	16.328
Ouder-Amstel	14.525
Landsmeer	11.685
Oostzaan	9.778
Total	1.672.281
