= Buitenveldert =

Coordinates: 52°20′N 4°53′E

- Neighborhood of Amsterdam
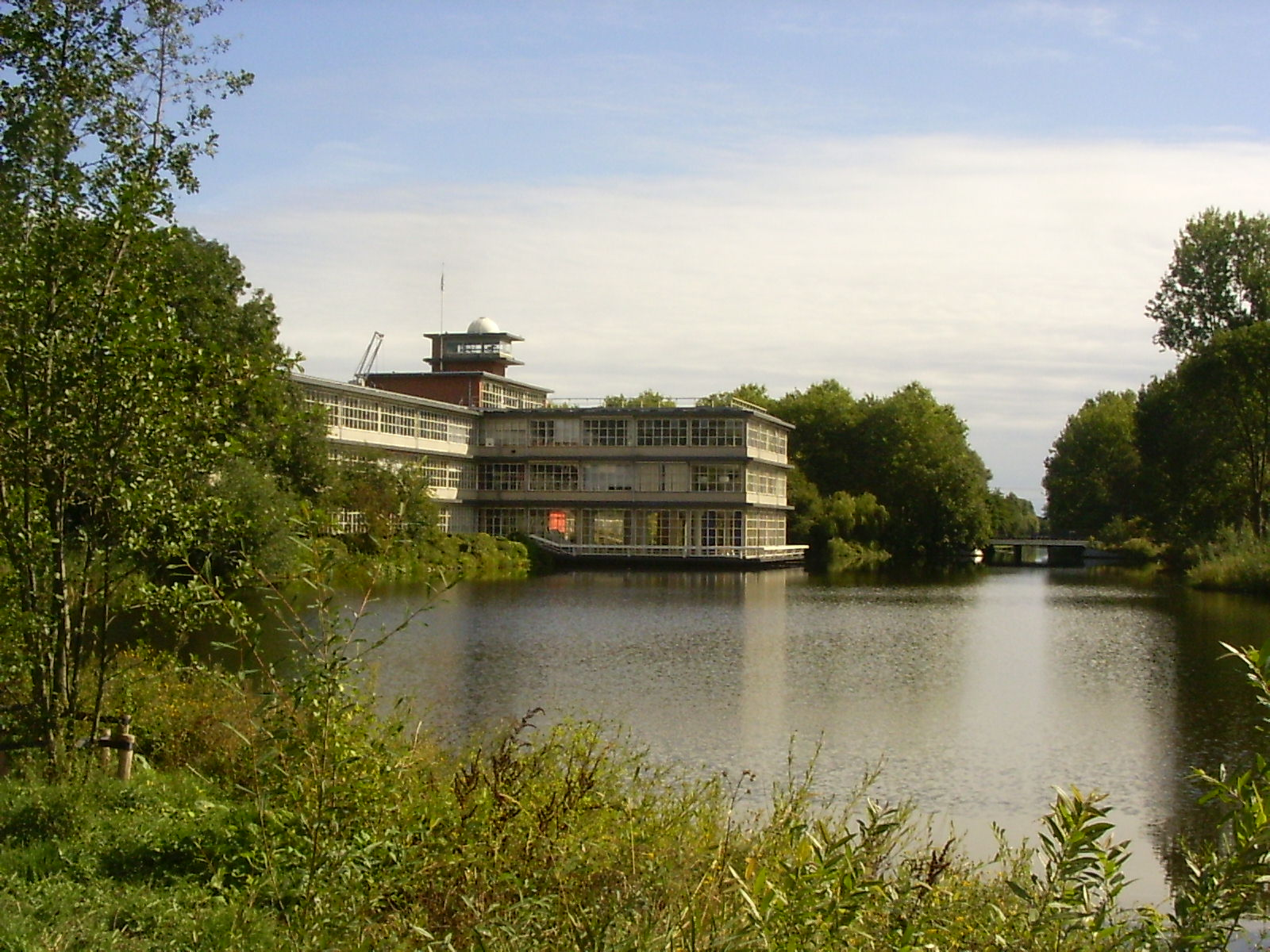
- Christelijke Scholengemeenschap Buitenveldert (1963).

- Flag

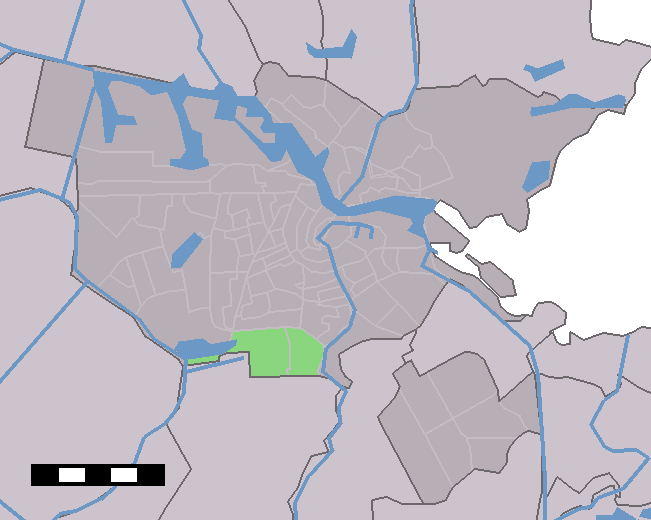
- Country: Netherlands
- Province: North Holland
- COROP: Amsterdam
- Borough: Zuid
- Time zone: UTC+1 (CET)

Buitenveldert is a neighborhood of Amsterdam, Netherlands. It is considered the modern Jewish quarter of Amsterdam with its synagogue, Jewish schools, nursing homes, shops and restaurants.

== History ==
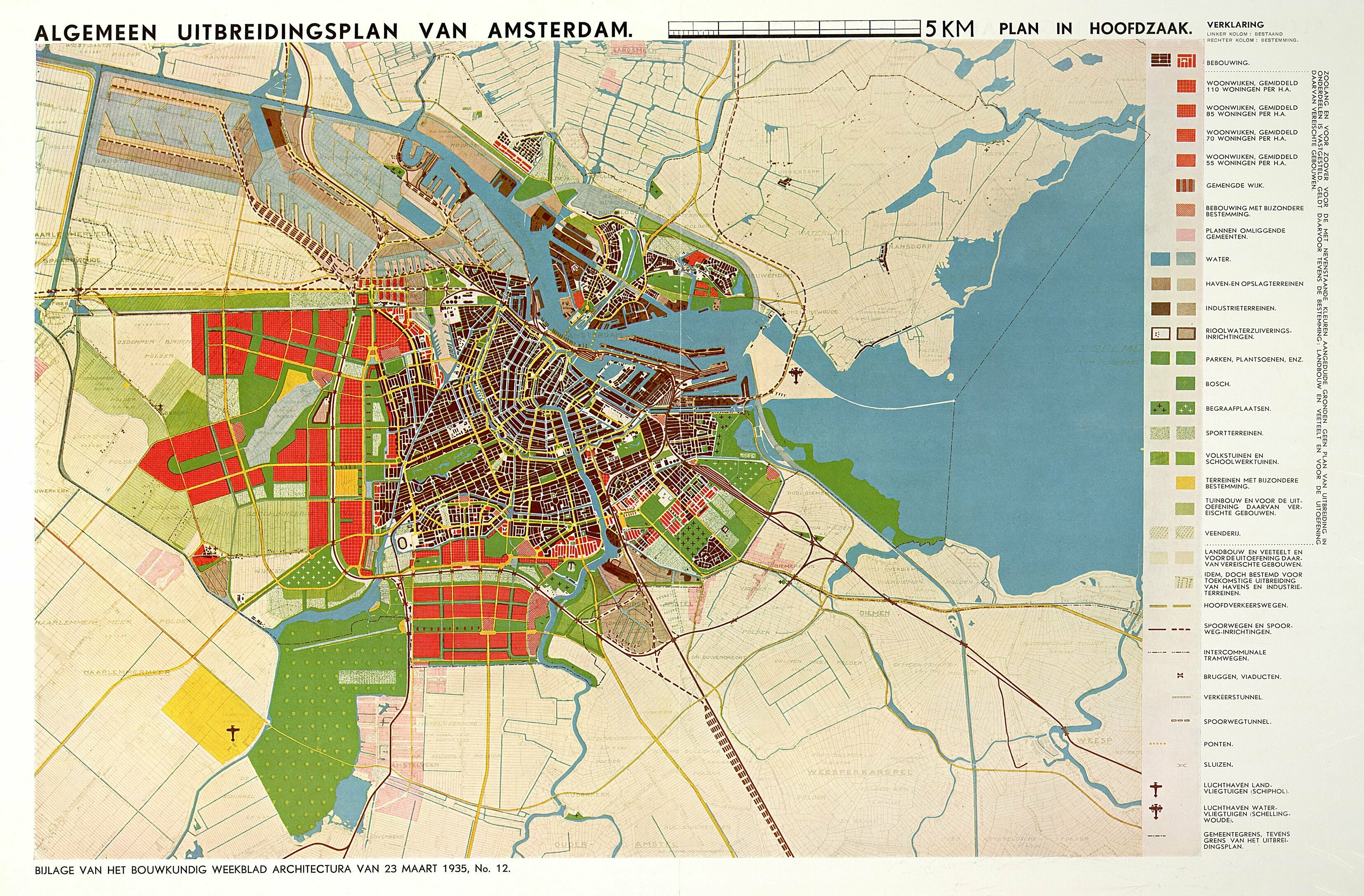
Algemeen Uitbreidingsplan 1935, including Buitenveldert garden city.

From the Middle Ages the 'Binnendijksche Buitenveldertse' polder in the rural Amstelland region was part of the Nieuwer-Amstel municipality. In 1921, the Buitenveldert polder was annexed by the city of Amsterdam. Since then, the Kalfjeslaan on the southside of Buitenveldert has been the city limit.

As part of the Algemene Uitbreidingsplan ('General Expansion Plan') of 1935, the Buitenveldert polder became the site of a new suburb. It was the only suburb on the south side of the city; most other suburbs were planned on the west side. In 1958 the first stone was laid for the suburb, which was designed according to the garden city planning principles. In 1959 the first residents moved into their new homes.

In 1987 Buitenveldert was granted the status of a borough. In 1998 the borough merged with the neighboring boroughs of Rivierenbuurt to form the new borough of Zuideramstel, which also included parts of the Prinses Irenebuurt. In 2010, after another merger, Buitenveldert became part of the borough of Amsterdam-Zuid.

In 1998, the masterplan for the Zuidas business district was adopted by the Amsterdam municipal council. The new business district has transformed the northern part of Buitenveldert, whereas the southern part has remained mostly residential. The highlight of this residential area is the Gelderlandplein, a shopping centre with several clothing shops, jewelries, restaurants, supermarkets and others. It is one of the few shopping centres in Amsterdam but while the others, like Magna Plaza and Bijenkorf, are located in the city centre, the Gelderlandplein is in this residential area.
