= Van Boshuizenstraat tram stop =

Tram station in Amsterdam, Netherlands

Van Boshuizenstraat
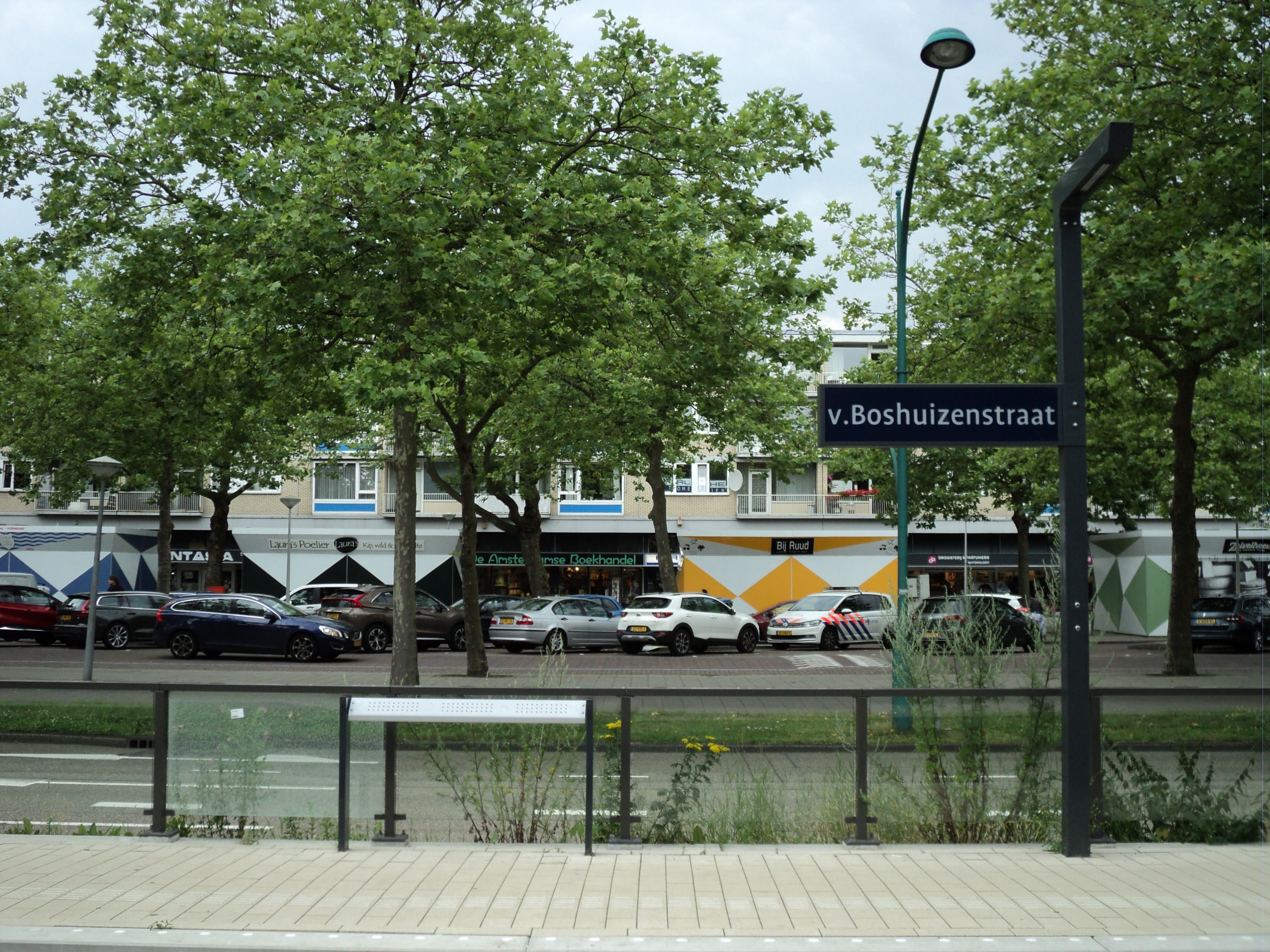

General information
- Location: Buitenveldertselaan & Van Boshuizenstraat, Amsterdam; Netherlands
- Coordinates: 52°19′31.0″N 4°52′8.4″E
- Platforms: 2 side platforms
- Tracks: 2

Other information
- Website: GVB: Van Boshuizenstraat

History
- Rebuilt: 2019–2020

Services
Preceding station	Amsterdam Tram	Following station
A.J. Ernststraat towards Westergasfabriek	Line 5	Uilenstede towards Stadshart
A.J. Ernststraat towards Station Zuid	Line 25	Uilenstede towards Uithoorn Centrum

Former services
Preceding station	Amsterdam Metro	Following station
A.J. Ernststraat towards Centraal Station	Line 51	Uilenstede towards Westwijk
Location
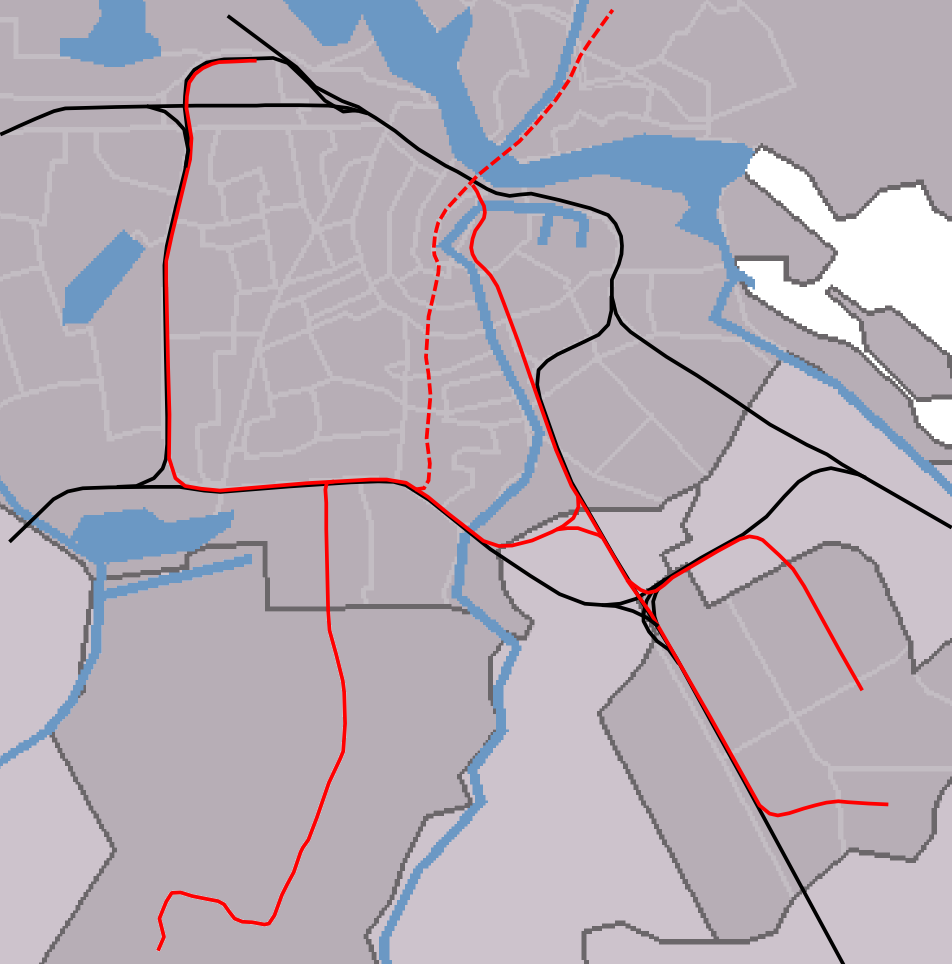
- Location within metro van Amsterdam

Van Boshuizenstraat is a tram stop within the city of Amsterdam, Netherlands. The stop serves tram lines 5 and 25. Line 25, dubbed the Amsteltram before receiving its line number, opened officially on 13 December 2020, unofficially 4 days earlier on 9 December.

Before being rebuilt in 2019 and 2020, the stop used to serve both the low-floor trams of tram line 5 plus the high-floor trams of metro line 51, a hybrid metro/sneltram (light rail) service that opened in 1990. Both lines 5 and 51 shared the same pair of tracks but used separate, adjacent platforms. There were a pair of low-level platforms for line 5 and a separate pair of high-level platforms for line 51, with stairs connecting the two platform levels. In 2019, metro line 51 service south of Amsterdam Zuid station was terminated to rebuild stations to accommodate only the low-floor trams of lines 5 and 25; the high-level platforms were demolished, and the low-level platforms were lengthened to handle a coupled pair of low-floor trams.
