= Zonnestein tram stop =

Tram station in Amstelveen, Netherlands

Zonnestein
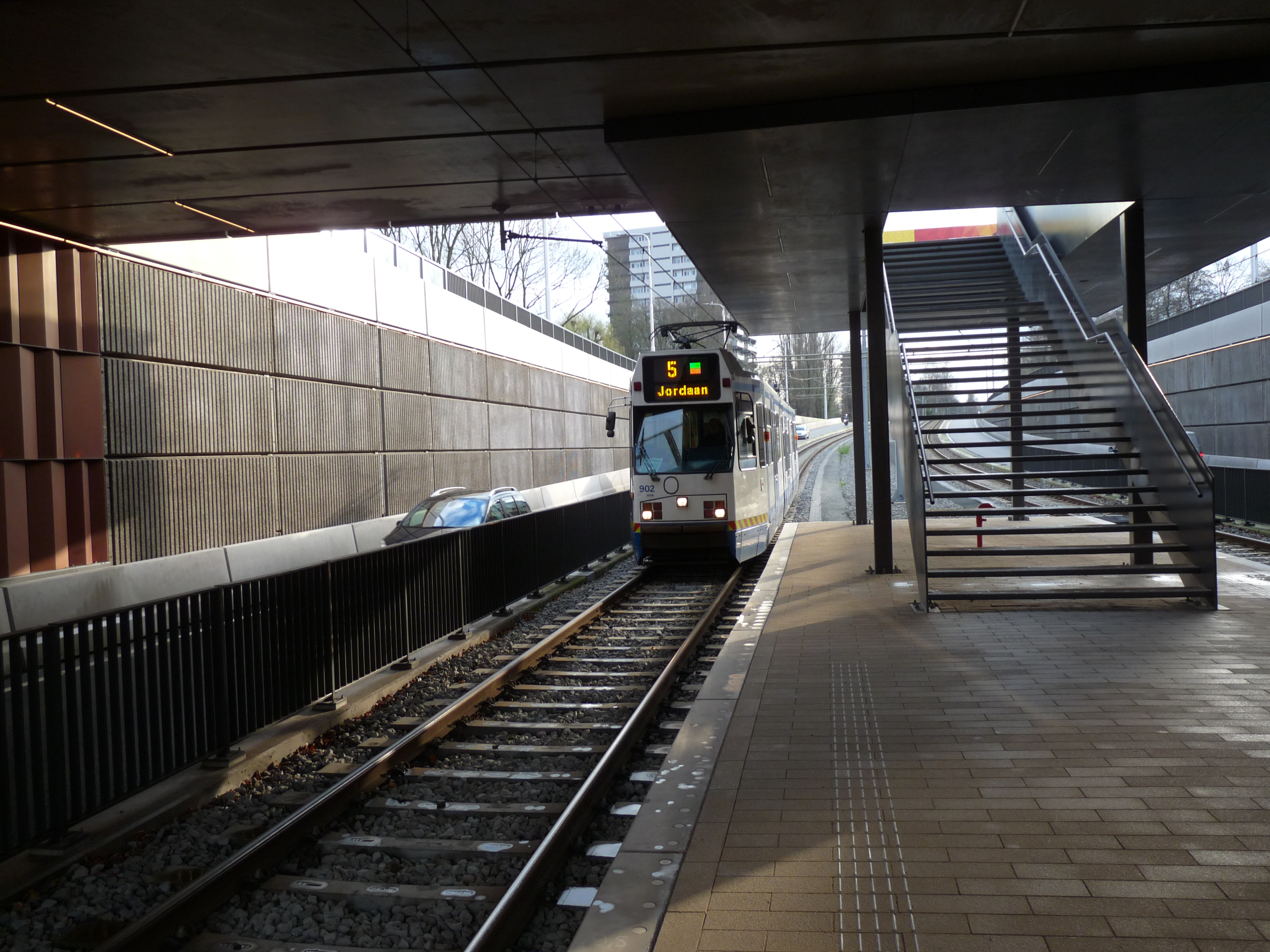
- Northbound line 5 tram arriving at Zonnestein stop

General information
- Location: Beneluxbaan & Zonnestein, Amstelveen; Netherlands
- Coordinates: 52°18′29.4″N 4°52′21.2″E
- Platforms: 1 centre platform
- Tracks: 2

Construction
- Platform levels: 2

Other information
- Website: GVB: Zonnestein

History
- Rebuilt: 2019–2020

Services
Preceding station	Amsterdam Tram	Following station
Kronenburg towards Westergasfabriek	Line 5	Onderuit towards Stadshart
Kronenburg towards Station Zuid	Line 25	Onderuit towards Uithoorn Centrum

Former services
Preceding station	Amsterdam Metro	Following station
Kronenburg towards Centraal Station	Line 51	Onderuit towards Westwijk
Location
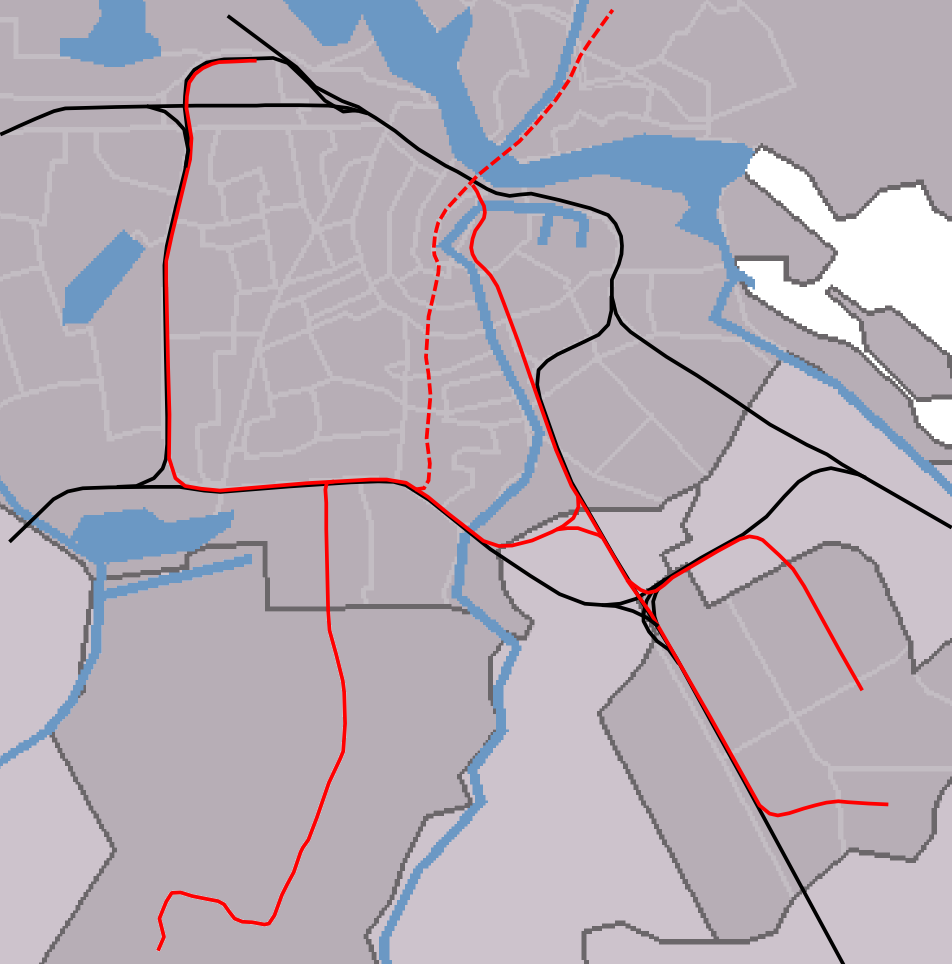
- Location within metro van Amsterdam

Zonnestein is a tram stop within the city of Amstelveen, Netherlands. The stop serves tram lines 5 and 25. Line 25, dubbed the Amsteltram before receiving its line number, opened officially on 13 December 2020, unofficially 4 days earlier on 9 December.

The stop is located in an open trench below street level, and resembles a station; it has a centre platform with stairs and a glass-walled elevator leading up to street level. Bridges above the stop carry automobile traffic over the tram line via a roundabout, and there are also two traffic lanes running under the roundabout parallel to each side of the tram tracks. This stop is similar in design to those at the Kronenburg and Sportlaan tram stops. On 25 March 2020, the Zonnestein stop was opened.

Before being rebuilt in 2019 and 2020, the stop used to serve both the low-floor trams of tram line 5 plus the high-floor trams of metro line 51, a hybrid metro/sneltram (light rail) service that opened in 1990. Both lines 5 and 51 shared the same pair of tracks but used separate, adjacent platforms. There were a pair of low-level platforms for line 5 and a separate pair of high-level platforms for line 51, with stairs connecting the two platform levels. Unlike the current stop, the old stop was located at street level and tracks used to cross the street Zonnestein at grade. In 2019, metro line 51 service south of Amsterdam Zuid station was terminated to rebuild stations to accommodate only the low-floor trams of lines 5 and 25.
