= Amsterdam Zuid =

Amsterdam Zuid may refer to:

- Amsterdam-Zuid, a borough of Amsterdam
- Amsterdam Zuid station, a Dutch railway station
