= De Boelelaan/VU tram stop =

Tram station in Amsterdam, Netherlands

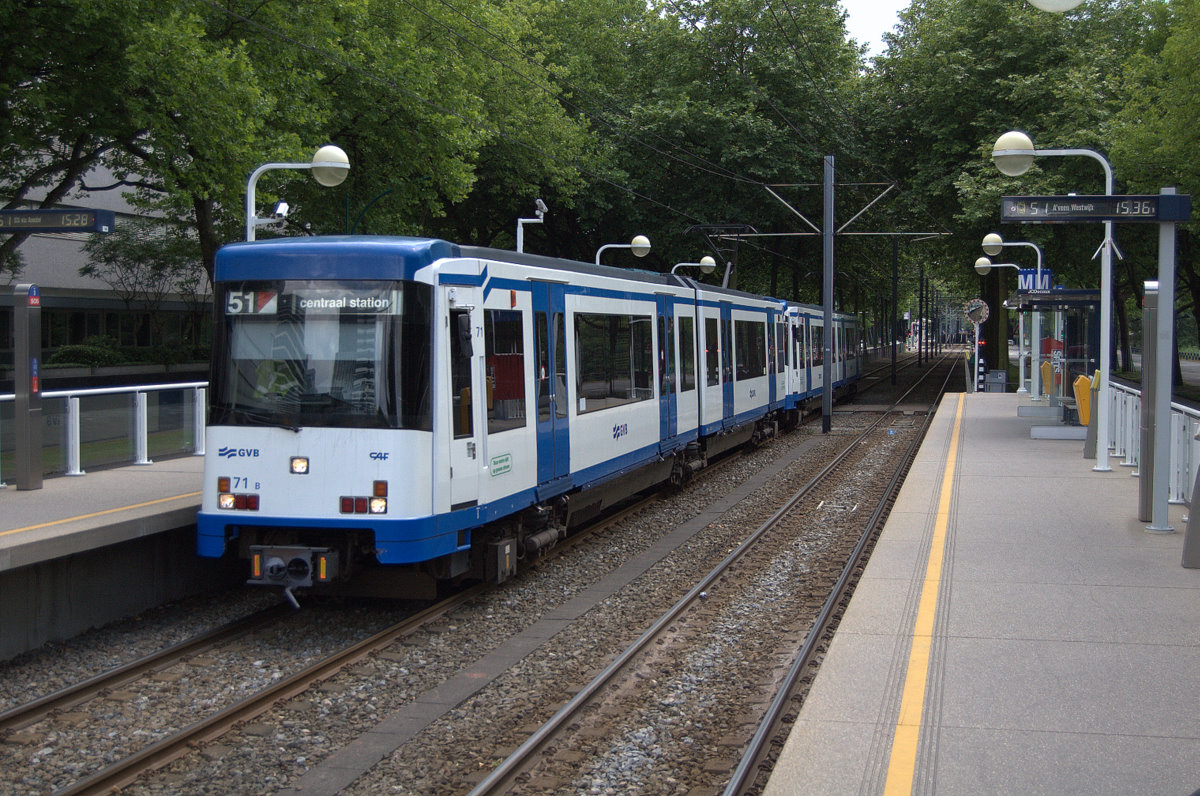
- former De Boelelaan/VU stop in 2011

General information
- Location: Current: 1081 HV; Amsterdam, Netherlands; Former: Buitenveldertselaan & De Boelelaan, Amsterdam; Netherlands
- Coordinates: 52°20′3.4″N 4°52′7.9″E

History
- Closed: 2019 (line 51)

Services
Preceding station	Amsterdam Tram	Following station
VU medisch centrum towards Frederiksplein	Line 24	Terminus
Former services
Preceding station	Amsterdam Metro	Following station
Station Zuid towards Centraal Station	Line 51	A.J. Ernststraat towards Westwijk
Location
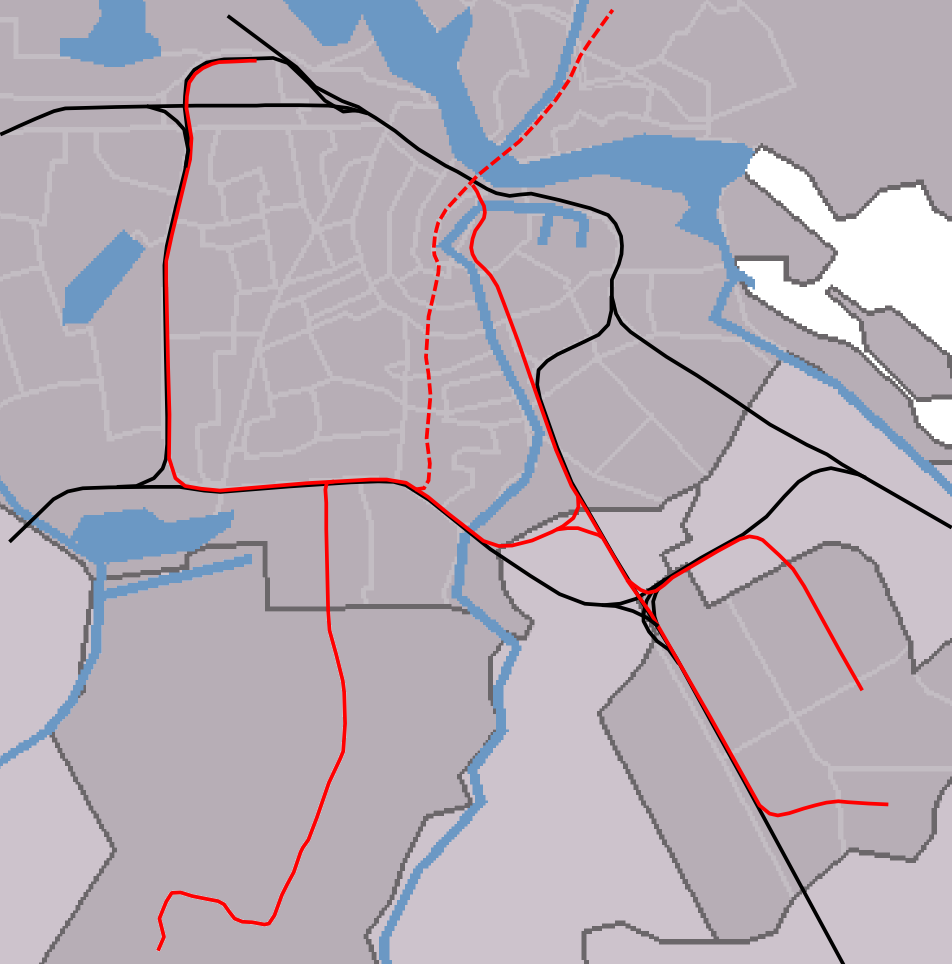
- Location within metro van Amsterdam

There were two tram stops with the name De Boelelaan/VU at or near the intersection of Parnassusweg/Buitenveldertselaan & De Boelelaan in Amsterdam. (Parnassusweg and Buitenveldertselaan are effectively the same north–south street with a change of name at the cross-street De Boelelaan.) A combined metro/tram stop was located along Buitenveldertselaan on the south side of De Boelelaan, and a separate tram stop is located on the north side of De Boelelaan about 180 metres (590 ft) west of Parnassusweg. The information box (right) pertains to the former stop along Buitenveldertselaan.

== Metro stop along Buitenveldertselaan ==
The former stop De Boelelaan/VU. located along Buitenveldertselaan, was a combined metro station and tram stop. Until its closing in 2019, it served metro line 51, a hybrid metro/sneltram (light rail) route, and tram route 5. After closing, the facility was demolished. Today, riders are expected to use the nearby A.J. Ernststraat stop (about 300 metres (980 ft) to the south) which serves tram lines 5 and 25. Tram line 25 replaced metro line 51 south of Amsterdam Zuid station; it opened officially on 13 December 2020, unofficially 4 days earlier on 9 December. Today, trams of lines 5 and 25 bypass the site.

Before being closed, the stop had served both the low-floor trams of tram line 5 plus the high-floor trams of metro line 51. Both lines 5 and 51 shared the same pair of tracks but used separate, adjacent platforms. There were a pair of low-level platforms for line 5 and a separate pair of high-level platforms for line 51, with stairs connecting the two platform levels. In 2019, metro line 51 service south of Amsterdam Zuid station was terminated to rebuild stations to accommodate only the low-floor trams of lines 5 and 25; however, this stop was not retained.

In order to increase reliability and reduce travel time on the rebuilt line, five line 51 stations, including De Boelelaan/VU, were demolished instead of being retained for low-floor trams. In March 2015, the plan was to demolish the A.J. Ernststraat stop, and move the De Boelelaan/VU further south. (At that time, the two stops were 350 metres (1,150 ft) apart.) However, by September 2016, the fate of the two stops was interchanged. De Boelelaan/VU would be demolished, and the A.J. Ernststraat stop would be moved slightly north. The decision was related to the development of the knowledge district (kenniskwartier) of the Vrije Universiteit Amsterdam (VU).

The current stop De Boelelaan/VU is located on the north side of De Boelelaan about 180 metres (590 ft) west of Parnassusweg. The stop is at the neck of a tram loop that turns unidirectional from east to west. The curve of the loop has a double-ended siding. The loop opened on 31 October 2011 replacing a former loop on Gustav Mahlerlaan near the VU Medisch Centrum tram stop. As of January 2021, tram line 24 uses the loop.
