= Amsteltram =

Tram line in Amsterdam, Netherlands

Amsteltram Amsterdam tram line 25
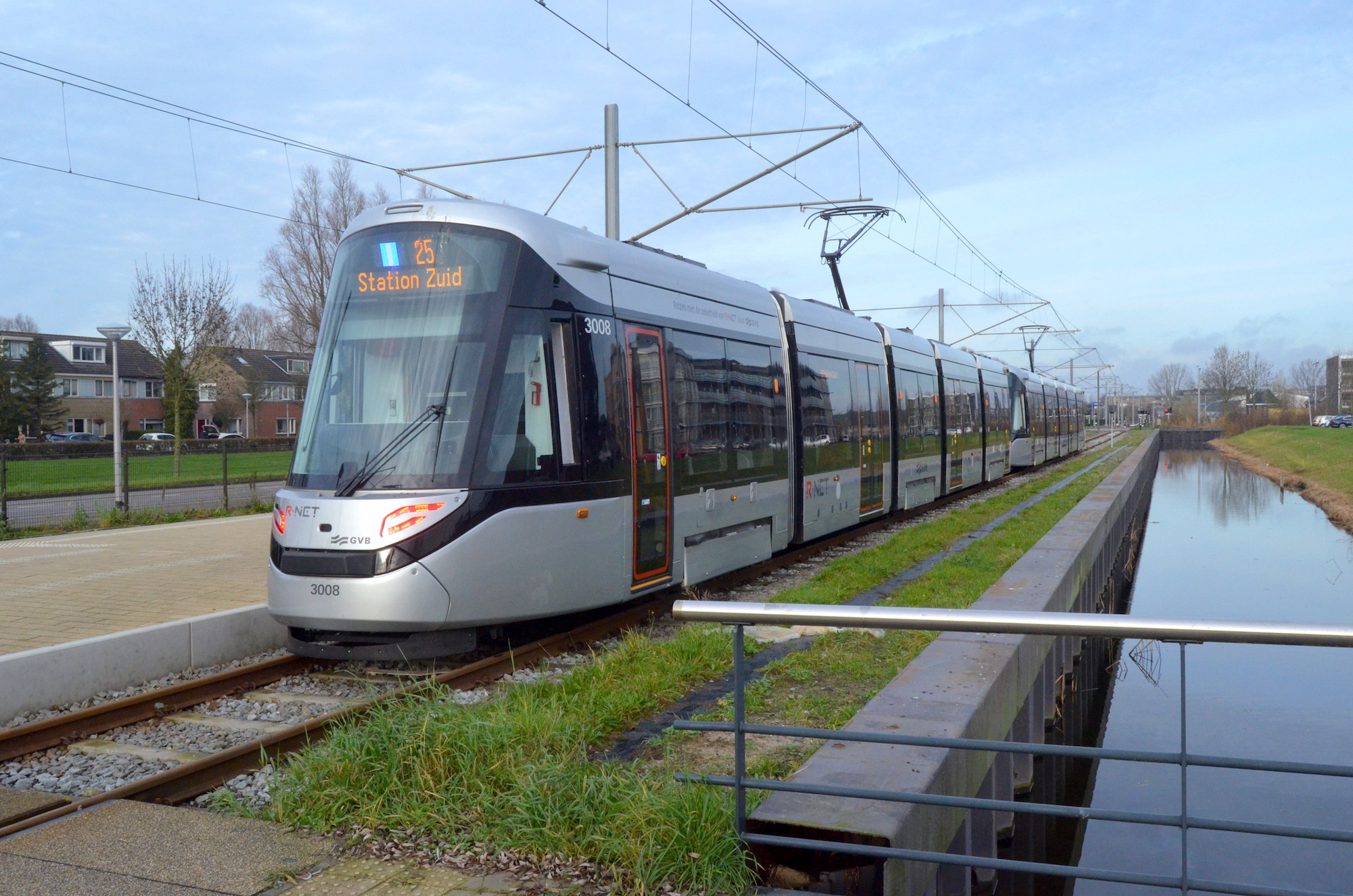
- Coupled 15G trams approaching stop Amstelveen Westwijk

Overview
- Locale: Amsterdam, Amstelveen, Uithoorn
- Termini: Amsterdam Muiderpoort Station; Uithoorn Centrum, Uithoorn
- Website: GVB: Line 25

Service
- Route number: 25
- Operator(s): Gemeente Vervoerbedrijf (GVB)
- Rolling stock: GVB type 15G, built by CAF

History
- Opened: 13 December 2020 (to Westwijk); 21 July 2024 (to Uithoorn)

Technical
- Track gauge: 1,435 mm (4 ft 8 1/2 in) standard gauge
- Electrification: 600 V DC from overhead catenary

Amsterdam tram line 25, also known as the Amsteltram, is a tram line running south from Amsterdam Zuid station in Amsterdam via Westwijk in Amstelveen to Uithoorn Centrum in Uithoorn. It officially opened to Westwijk on 13 December 2020 (unofficially 4 days earlier on 9 December). The tram line replaced metro line 51 (a.k.a. the Amstelveenlijn), a light rail line (sneltram) that ceased running south of Amsterdam Zuid station on 3 March 2019 to convert it for low-floor trams. Tram line 5 shares the stops with line 25 between Zuid station and Oranjebaan stations. Line 5 had also shared the same tracks with Metro Line 51, the former using low-level platforms for regular trams, and the latter using high-level platforms (since demolished).

The Amsteltram was later extended south of Westwijk to the municipality of Uithoorn with the extension opening 21 July 2024. A trip from Uithoorn Centrum to Amsterdam Zuid station takes about 30 minutes. On 29 March 2026, tram line 25 was extended north-eastwards from Amsterdam Zuid Station to Muiderpoort Station.

The Amsteltram project was built in two phases. Phase 1, the northern section between Amsterdam Zuid station and Westwijk in Amstelveen, retained the Amstelveenlijn name, the suffix lijn meaning line. The section south of Westwijk to Uithoorn, phase 2 of the project, was called the Uithoornlijn. News releases sometimes refer to tram line 25 as the Amstelveenlijn, given that it almost completely follows the former metro line 51 route south of Station Zuid through Amstelveen. Out of five names proposed for the line, Amsteltram received a plurality of votes from a group of almost 2,500 local residents. Later, the line received its line number. IJtram (line 26) is another Amsterdam tram line with both a name as well as a number.

== Infrastructure ==
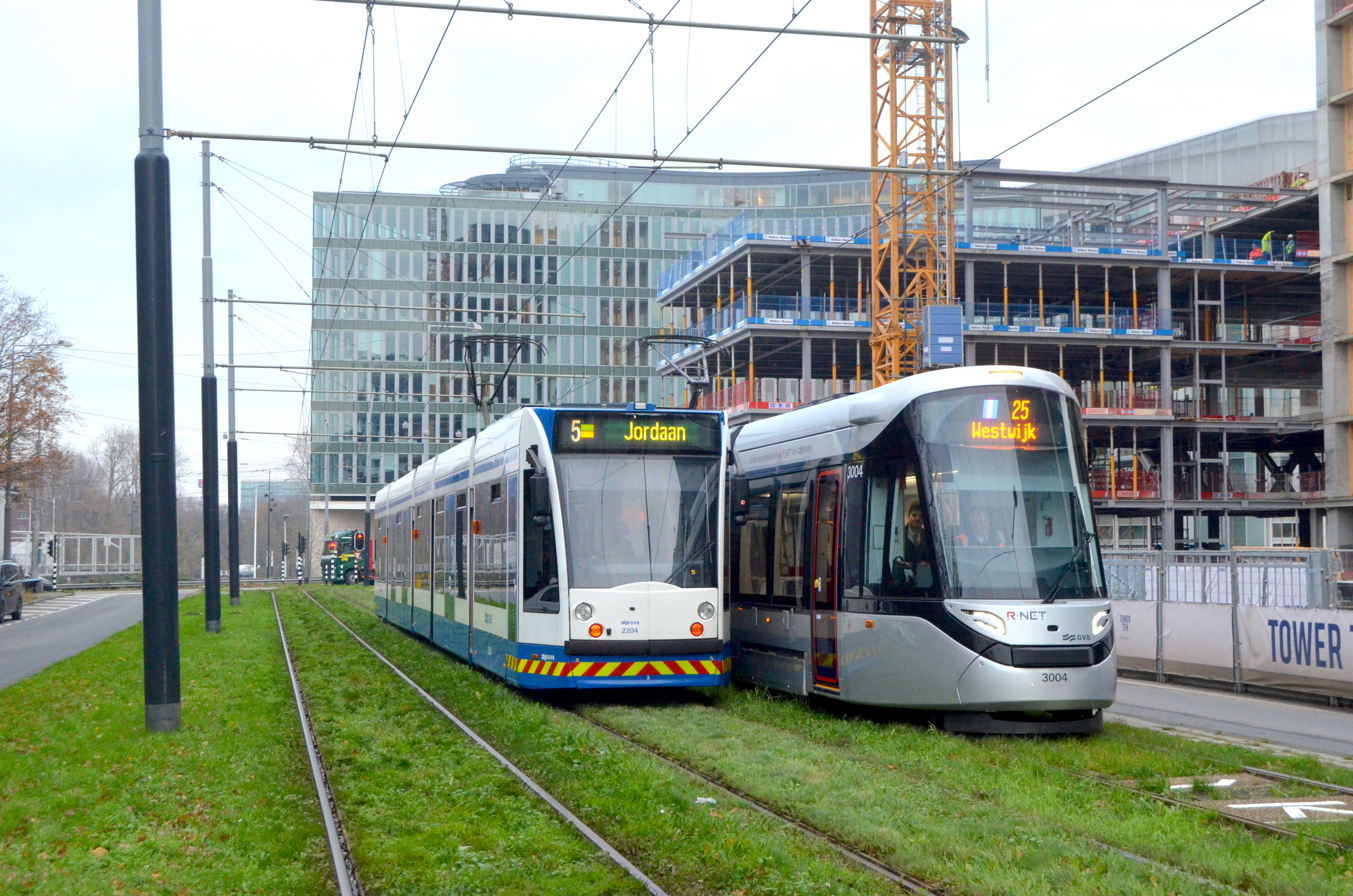
Northbound line 5 tram passing a line 25 tram on the turnback track along Strawinskylaan

The northern end of line 25 starts from a turnback track along Strawinskylaan near Beethovenstraat, and proceeds west in a centre reservation to the Station Zuid tram stop opposite Amsterdam Zuid station. After leaving Station Zuid, the line runs south along Parnassusweg, Buitenveldertselaan and Beneluxbaan (effectively the same north-south street with changes in name) in a centre reservation until Gondel, a street south of the Sportlaan tram stop. The centre reservation keeps the tram line free of road traffic except for level crossings at major street intersections. Tram lines 5 and 25 both serve the tram stops between Station Zuid and Oranjebaan tram stop. South of Oranjebaan, there is a track junction where tram line 5 branches off to terminate at Stadshart. Three line 25 stations (Kronenburg, Zonnestein and Sportlaan) are located below street level in an underpass, thus eliminating the need for a grade crossing at a major cross-street. (Line 5 also services the Kronenburg and Zonnestein stops.) South of Gondel, the line runs off-street to the end of line at the Westwijk tram stop, with level crossings at streets crossing the tracks. The Legmeerpolder tram storage facility lies a short distance south of the Westwijk stop. The line crosses Legmeerpolder and follows a former railway right-of-way to terminate at Uithoorn Centrum.

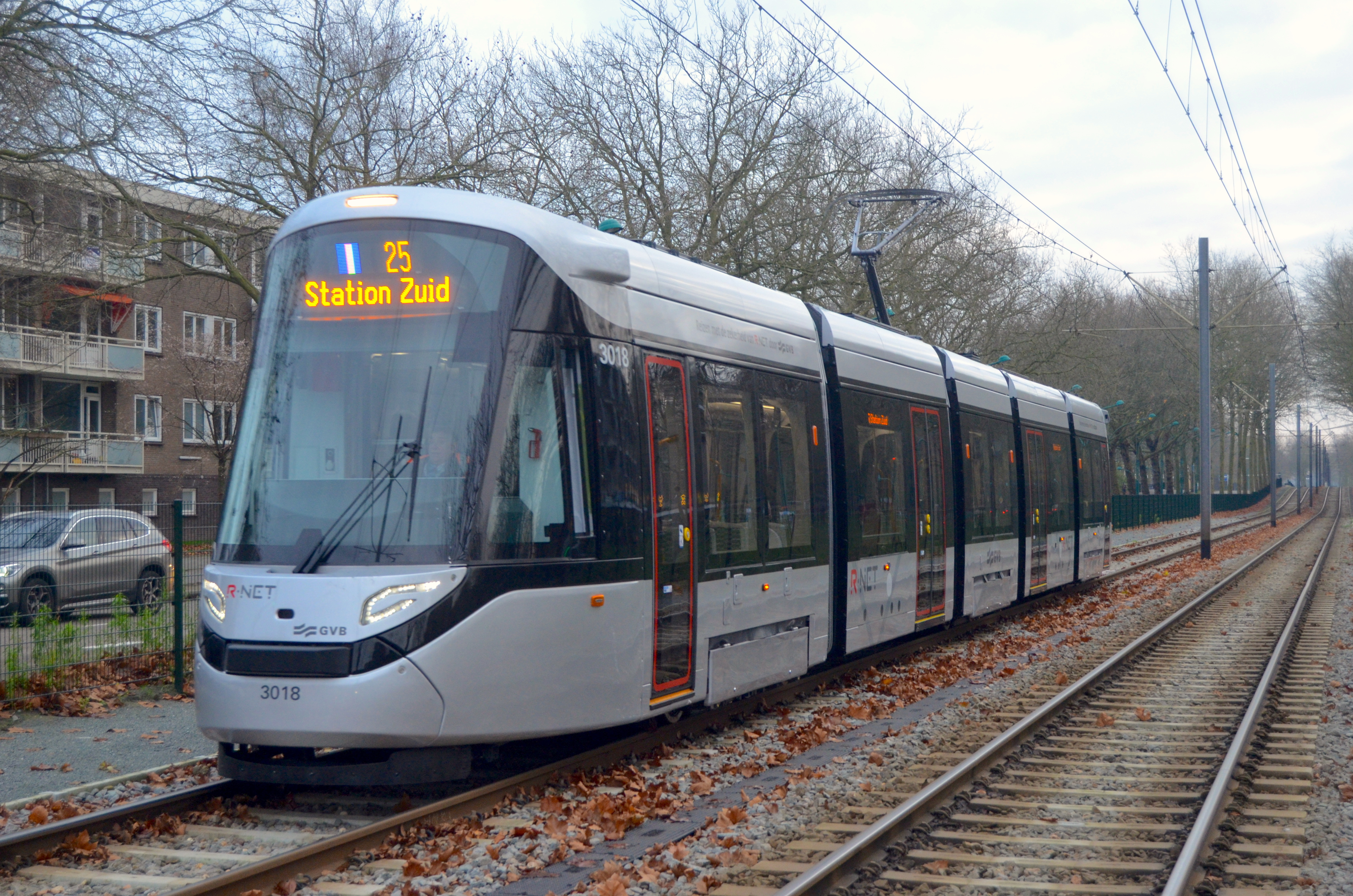
15G tram on Buitenveldertselaan

The Amsteltram uses low-floor trams (type 15G) manufactured in Spain by Construcciones y Auxiliar de Ferrocarriles (CAF). The trams are bi-directional with a cab at each end of the car to eliminate the requirement for turning loops. Each tram consists of 5 sections, and is 30 metres long and 2.4 metres wide. The capacity of each tram is 180 passengers including 50 seated. Sixty-three of these trams were ordered. The trams can be coupled to run in pairs. The nose at each end of the tram is shaped so that in the event of a collision, the tram pushes aside the other vehicle rather than trapping it under the tram.

The 15G trams assigned to the Amsteltram have the red-silver R-net livery rather than the blue-white GVB livery. The R-net livery will still incorporate the GVB logo. R-net (short for Randstadnet) is the hallmark for high-order public transport in the Randstad; it also used on the Amsterdam Metro. All other trams in Amsterdam use the GVB livery.

When the trams are coupled in pairs, there is a driver in the lead tram and usually a conductor in the second to sell tickets and provide information. Trams can operate singlely without a conductor; in this case, onboard ticket sales would not be available.

A tram storage yard is located south of the Westwijk terminus in Legmeerpolder on the south side of J.C. van Hattumweg. The site has a service building (dienstgebouw) for GVB personnel and a mixed-use building (combinatiegebouw) with a rectifier station to convert AC to DC, technical space for minor repairs and storage space. The site has storage space for 26 trams for the Amstelveenlijn plus 10 for the Uithoornlijn. The yard has 2,500 metres of track including 11 turnouts. As of November 2022, a new building is being built for light tram maintenance and for washing trams.

== Amstelveenlijn ==
=== Background ===
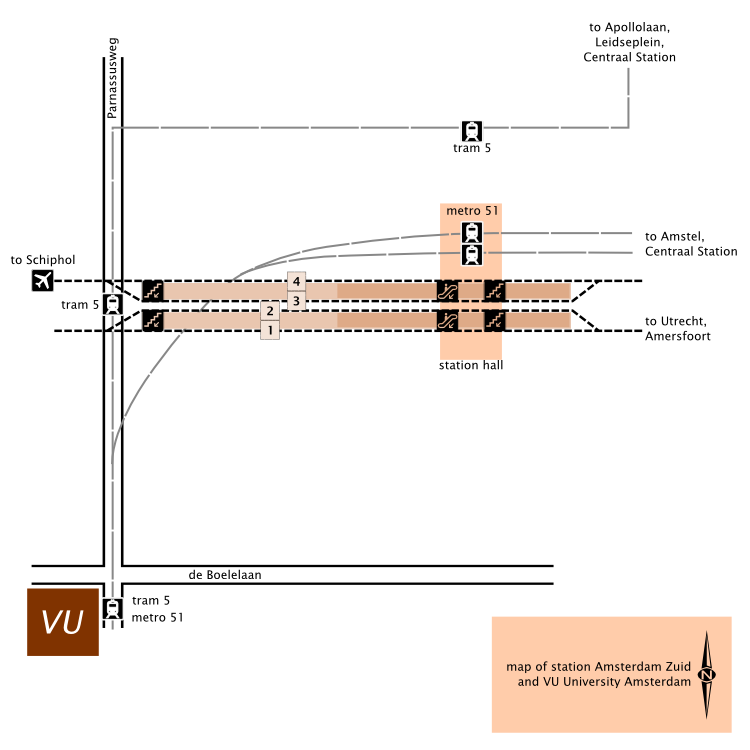
Line 51 transition curve from metro to sneltram at Zuid station before 2019

Dubbed the Amstelveenlijn, Metro line 51 was a combination metro and light-rail (sneltram) line that ran from Amsterdam Centraal station via Amsterdam Zuid station to Amstelveen. The line opened to Poortwachter in Amstelveen on 2 December 1990 and was extended to Westwijk on 13 September 2004. The tracks were shared with tram line 5 roughly between De Boelelaan/VU and Oranjebaan stations. There were bi-level platforms along the route: high-level platforms for metro line 51 and low-level for tram line 5. The tracks ran mainly along a reserved right-of-way in the middle of the street Beneluxbaan with street intersections controlled by traffic lights. On 3 March 2019, metro line 51 service from Amsterdam Zuid station to Amstelveen ended in order to convert the line for low-floor tram operation; metro line 51 was rerouted to terminate at Isolatorweg metro station. Tram line 5 continued operation to Stadshart in Amstelveen.

At Amsterdam Zuid station, light-rail trains had to change over from metro mode to tram mode. Heading south, a light-rail train would raise its pantograph, retract its third-rail shoes and switch voltage from 750V (metro) to 600V (light rail). Also, the train had to retract its boarding plates at each door as light-rail cars were narrower than metro cars.

Light-rail service was terminated because the light rail vehicles were old, crowded and prone to breakdowns. The change-over between metro and tram mode was a cause of many malfunctions as the vehicles aged. The design of the line was not ideal for safety, often experiencing collisions. GVB, the operator of the line, expects better reliability and safety after upgrading the line.

The cost of renovating the Amstelveen line is €300 million with the municipality of Amsterdam paying €225 million and the Dutch government paying the remaining €75 million. The estimated cost of the extension to Uithoorn (Uithoornlijn) is €60 million.

=== Conversion ===
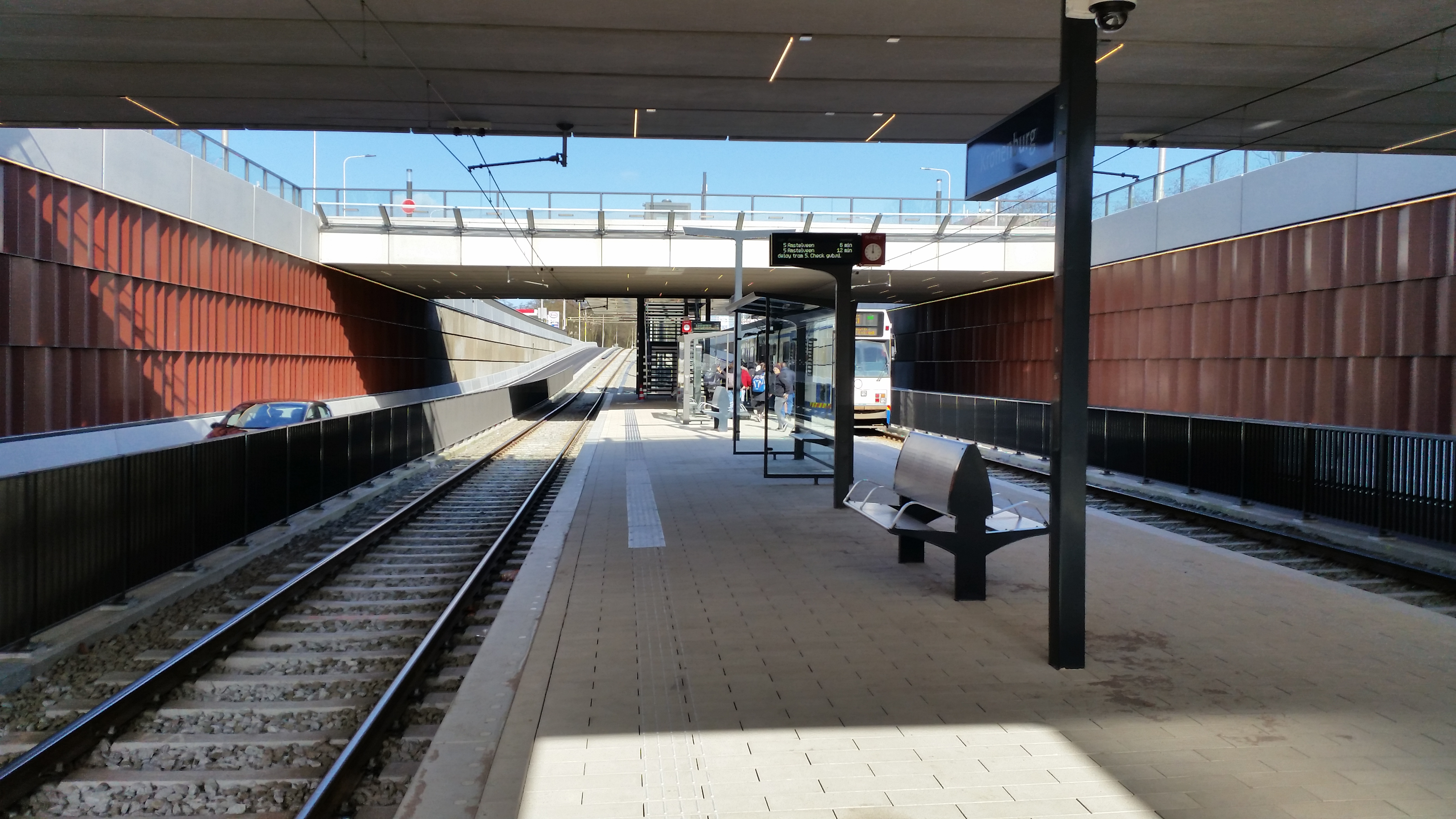
Kronenburg stop after rebuilding

The following is a summary of the work performed to renovate the Amstelveenlijn, and convert it from light-rail to tram operation.

- Removal of high-level platforms.
- Replacement or overhaul of tracks, power lines and technical systems.
- Rebuilding 3 level crossings as underpasses along Beneluxbaan at Kronenburg, Zonnestein and Sportlaan.
- Removal of 4 stops: Amstelveen Centrum, Marne, Gondel and Spinnerij.
- Combining the De Boelelaan/VU and A.J. Ernststraat stops and replacing them with a new intermediate stop named A.J. Ernststraat (the same name as one of the two old stops).

Until 29 March 2026, the Amsteltram terminated at the Station Zuid tram stop on Strawinskylaan on the north side of Amsterdam Zuid station. However, as part of the separate Zuidasdok project (related to the renovation at the railway station), the terminus was planned to be relocated to a new tram station on Arnold Schönberglaan on the south side of the railway station. In 2025, construction of the new tram terminus was expected to start in 2027 after completion of the A10 highway tunnel; the terminal would be constructed over the south A10 tunnel. In the meantime, the platforms at the Station Zuid and Parnassusweg tram stops were lengthened to handle coupled pairs of trams in the meantime. (The Parnassusweg stop is just north of the former metro line 51 branch into the Zuid metro station.)

== Uithoornlijn ==
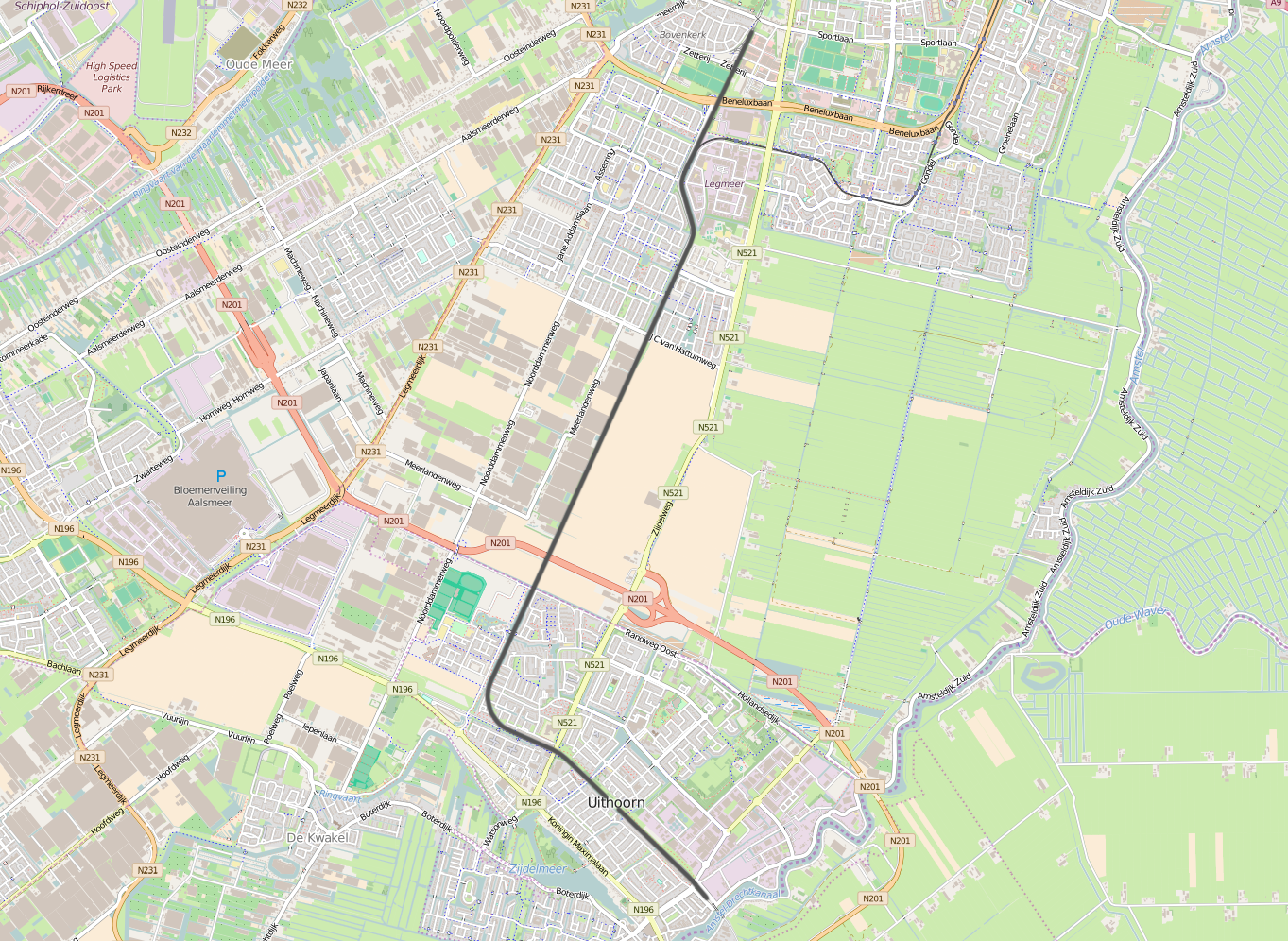
The Uithoornlijn follows the right-of-way of the abandoned Bovenkerk – Uithoorn railway line.

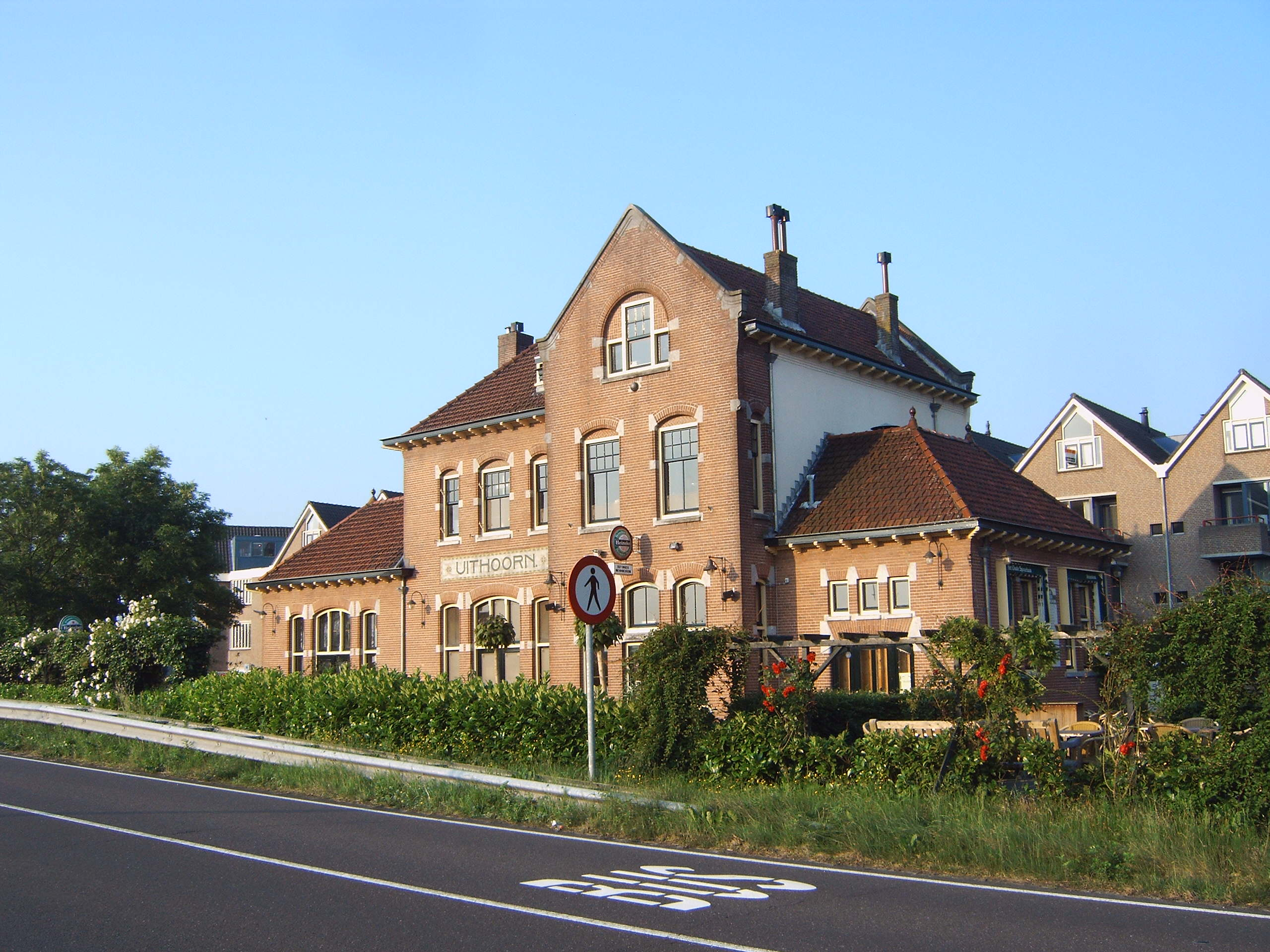
Former Uithoorn railway station

The Uithoornlijn is the southward extension of the Amsteltram from Westwijk in Amstelveen into the neighbouring municipality of Uithoorn. The extension follows the abandoned right-of-way of the Bovenkerk – Uithoorn line of the former Haarlemmermeer railway lines. (The steam railway line opened in 1915. Passenger service ended in 1950 and freight service ended in 1972. Most of the line had been scrapped by 1987.) The existing Sacharovlaan and Westwijk tram stops, as well as the Legmeerpolder tram storage yard, are also along that former railway right-of-way. From Westwijk, the extension follows the old railway embankment south across Legmeerpolder to the street Aan de Zoom before curving east to Uithoorn's village centre, on the Amstel River. The final stop is near the former Uithoorn railway station which still stands.

The extension is 4.4 kilometres (2.7 mi) long and has three stops:

- Aan de Zoom (at the western end of its namesake street)
- Uithoorn Station (next to the bus station at Boerlagelaan)
- Uithoorn Centrum (in Uithoorn's village centre, near the Amstel River)

A bus-only roadway runs over the former railway right-of-way from Uithoorn Centrum to where the right-of-way curves north. Tram tracks were added to the roadway to support both buses and trams. The extension included a bridge over highway N201 at the south end of the embankment over Legmeerpolder, and an underpass to pass under Zijdelweg. The tram line crosses the streets Randweg, Bieslook, Aan de Zoom and Boerlagelaan at grade with each crossing, protected by crossing gates, warning lights and a bell. There are also warning lights at the stops Aan de Zoom and Uithoorn Station where riders can cross the tracks to access the desired platform.

The scheduled travel time from Uithoorn Centrum to Amsterdam Zuid station is 30 minutes. The three new stations have parking for autos and bicycles. Ninety percent of the addresses in Uithoorn are within a radius of 800 metres (2,600 ft) from a tram stop or a radius of 400 metres (1,300 ft) from a connecting bus line.

Maximum tram speed on the Uithoorlijn by location
Location	Speed
crossing Legmeerpolder	70 km/h (43 mph)
between Legmeerpolder and Aan de Zoom	50 km/h (31 mph)
on the curve between Aan de Zoom and the bus/tram roadway	30 km/h (19 mph)
on the bus/tram roadway between the curve and Amsterdamseweg	50 km/h (31 mph)
between Amsterdamseweg and the tram terminal	15 km/h (9.3 mph)

== Timeline ==
Metro line 51 (a.k.a. the Amstelveenlijn), a light rail line (sneltram), ceased running on 3 March 2019 to permit the conversion of the Amsteltram for low-floor trams.

Construction of the Legmeerpolder tram storage yard started in September 2018 for completion in August 2020.

On 9 March 2020, the new Kronenburg stop was opened. The stop is located in a cut below street level, and resembles a station with a centre platform with stairs and a glass-walled elevator leading up to street level. Bridges above the stop carry automobile traffic over the tram line via a roundabout. On 25 May, the similarly designed Zonnestein stop opened, and on 7 August, the Sportlaan stop opened.

On 11 September 2019, the Amsteltram was given the line number 25 (Tramlijn 25).

Testing of the line and vehicles started on 17 August 2020. Training of 300 tram operators started in October. Beginning 30 November, a full system test of line was conducted with trams running to schedule but without passengers.

Unofficially, line 25 carried paying passengers starting 9 December 2020 during the system testing period. However, the GVB did not provide any real-time travel information for line 25 during that early opening period. The official opening was 4 days later on 13 December.

In mid-January 2021, construction crews started to set up a yard to support construction of the Uithoornlijn, including storage for machines and materials, and to provide work and rest areas for workers. The yard was set up along the old railway right-of-way (to be used by the tram extension) just south of where it crosses highway N201.

By early February 2021, after nearly two months of operation operating, the GVB reported many teething problems with new infrastructure, vehicles and software along the Amsteltram line. Shuttle buses were used twice, once for a power failure at Zuid station and another due to a malfunction on a 15G tram. The resolution of service disruptions often required a technician to arrive onsite from another site. There were problems with signaling at the line 5 junction to Stadshart to set the correct route for a tram; sometimes the tram driver had to manually set the switch direction with a switch iron. (The GVB would later install signal boxes at switch locations so that a tram operator can change a switch setting with a key.)

In May 2022, work started to expand the Legmeerpolder tram storage yard to roughly double its size. The extended yard will contain a new building to wash and do light maintenance on trams.

In August 2022, work started to move the bus stop at Burgemeester Kootlaan further east along the busway in Uithoorn. The current location of the stop is just before where the Uithoornlijn would leave the busway to curve north towards the future tram stop at Aan de Zoom. Moving the bus stop would avoid trams having to wait for buses to load/unload passengers. Also in August 2022, work started to lay tram tracks between the streets Aan de Zoom and Randweg just south of Legmeerpolder.

In early June 2023, the tracks of the Uithoornlijn were connected to the Amstelveenlijn along the mainline and within the Legmeerpolder depot. On 19 June 2023, test trips without passengers started on the Uithornlijn. Thus began a one-year test period to last until opening which would include staff training.

On 21 July 2024, the Uithoornlijn opened for service operating on a summer timetable with a frequency of 6 trams per hour during rush hour, 5 per hour during the day and 4 per hour in the evening using single trams on the line. On 1 September, trams would revert to the normal timetable with 6 trams per hour during the day and 4 per hour in the evening, and use coupled two-tram trains. During the test period, the rear tram of a two-tram train derailed at a crossover switch at the Legmeerpolder depot. Thus for safety, only single trams were initially run along the line. The speed limit for coupled over the crossover in question was reduced from 30 kilometres per hour (19 mph) to 15 kilometres per hour (9.3 mph).

Effective 29 March 2026, the GVB extended tram line 25 north-eastwards from Amsterdam Zuid Station to Muiderpoort Station. The GVB also resurrected line 6 as a rush-hour service between Zuid and Westwijk, partly overlapping line 25.

== See also ==
- IJtram: Amsterdam tram line 26 also uses coupled pairs of trams on a right-of-way separated from road traffic.
- Utrecht sneltram which converted a high-floor sneltram line to low-floor trams
- Articles (in Dutch) about vehicles used on metro line 51 before the conversion of the Amstelveenlijn into tram line 25:
  - S1/S2 Series – used only on metro line 51
  - S3 Series – used on metro lines 50, 51, 53 & 54
