= Amsterdam tram line 5 =

Line 5
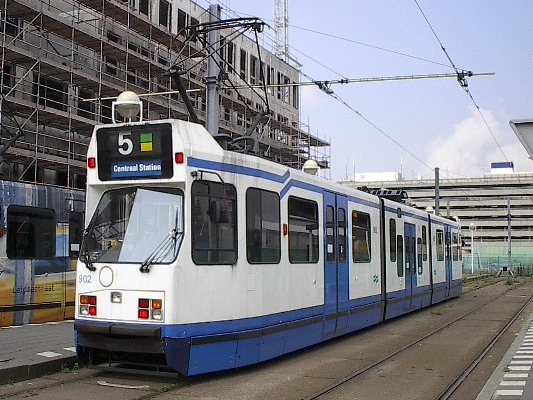
- 11G tram on line 5 at Amstelveen Stadshart

Overview
- Native name: Tramlijn 5 (Amsterdam)
- Locale: Amsterdam, Amstelveen
- Termini: Westergasfabriek; Amstelveen Stadshart
- Website: GVB: Line 5

Service
- Route number: 5
- Operator(s): Gemeente Vervoerbedrijf (GVB)
- Rolling stock: bidirectional trams

History
- Opened: 20 December 1978

Technical
- Track gauge: 1,435 mm (4 ft 8 1/2 in)
- Electrification: 600 V DC overhead

Tramlijn 5 is a tram line operating between Amsterdam and Amstelveen in the Netherlands. Operated by the municipal transport company GVB, the route runs between Van Hallstraat (signed as Westergasfabriek) in Amsterdam and Stadshart in the neighbouring municipality of Amstelveen. Tram line 5 connects several important areas of the city, including the Zuidas financial district and Leidseplein, and also provides a rapid tram route south of Amsterdam Zuid station to Stadshart, Amstelveen's town centre.

== Infrastructure ==
From its northern terminus at Westergasfabriek to Strawinskylaan, near Amsterdam Zuid railway station, tram line 5 operates in a combination of mixed traffic and tram-and-bus-only lanes. One exception is a short section of off-street track east of Leidseplein along the Leidsebosje park.

From the Station Zuid tram stop on Strawinskylaan to its southern terminal at Stadshart in Amstelveen, tram line 5 travels in a centre-of-road reservation with level crossings at street intersections. (Two stops, Kronenburg and Zonnestein, are below street level avoiding the level crossing.) Some stops have an island platform located between the two tracks, thus requiring trams equipped with doors on both sides of the vehicle. Trams must also have cabs at both ends because the line's southern terminus, Amstelveen Stadshart has dead-end tracks and a double crossover instead of a turning loop.

== History ==
Tram line 5 opened on 20 December 1978, and ran between Amsterdam Centraal station (Stationsplein) and Amsterdam Zuid station (Zuidplein).

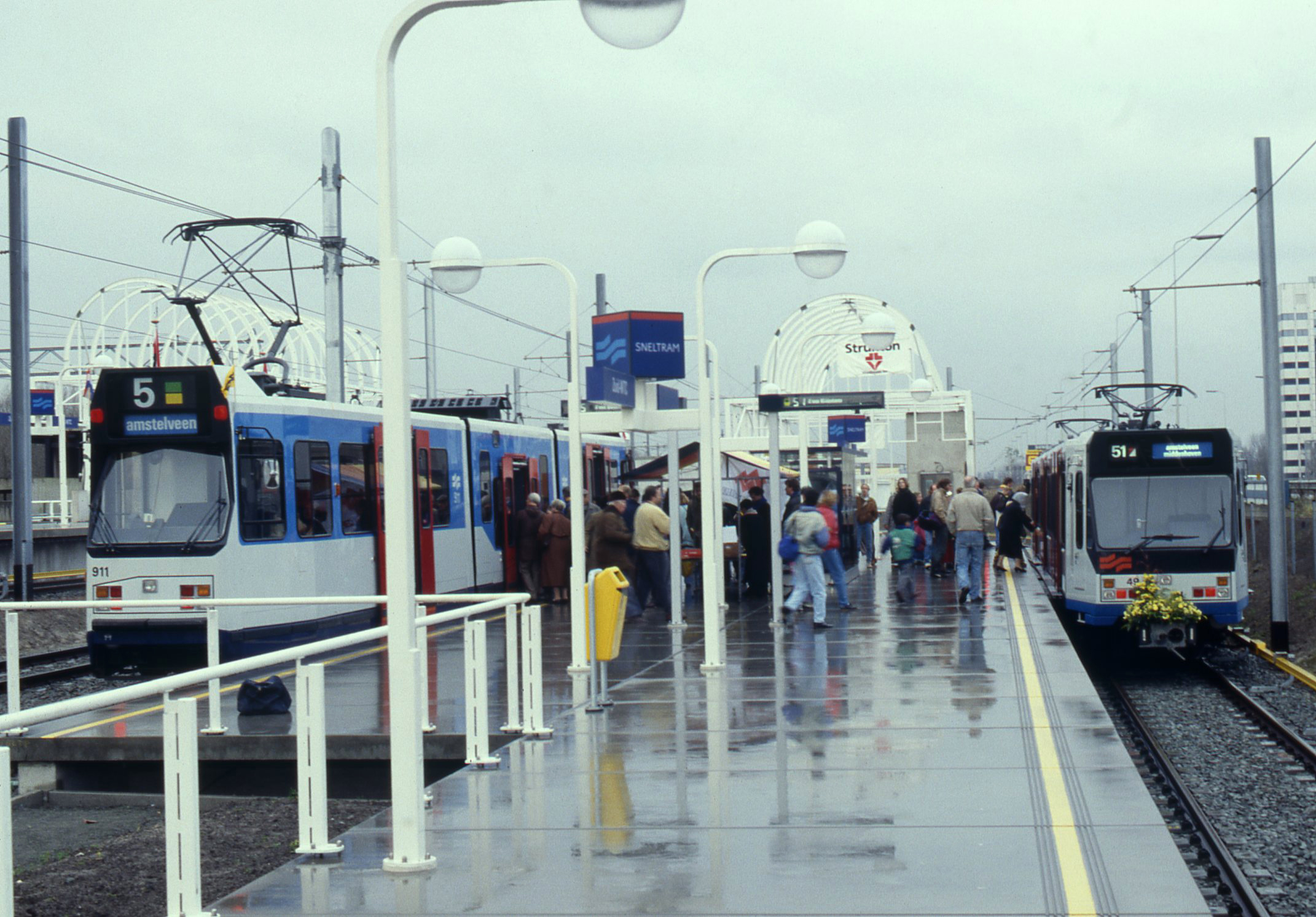
Between 1990 and 2008, the Line 5 tram stop was integrated with Zuid metro station.

Effective 1 December 1990, line 5 was extended south from Zuid station along Parnassusweg, Buitenveldertselaan and Beneluxbaan before turning into and terminating at the Binnenhof stop (today called the Stadshart stop). From Zuid station to the junction to Binnenhof/Stadshart, tram line 5 shared its tracks with metro line 51, a hybrid metro/sneltram line which opened on 2 December 1990 between Zuid station and Westwijk. Each station between De Boelelaan/VU and Oranjebaan had two sets of adjacent platforms: high-level platforms for the high-floor metro 51 vehicles, and low-level platforms for tram 5.

In 1990, the line 5 tram stop at Zuidplein was replaced by a stop integrated into the Zuid metro station. In May 2008, in order to make room for the construction of the north–south line (metro line 52), the tram stop was relocated to Strawinskylaan on the north side of the station.

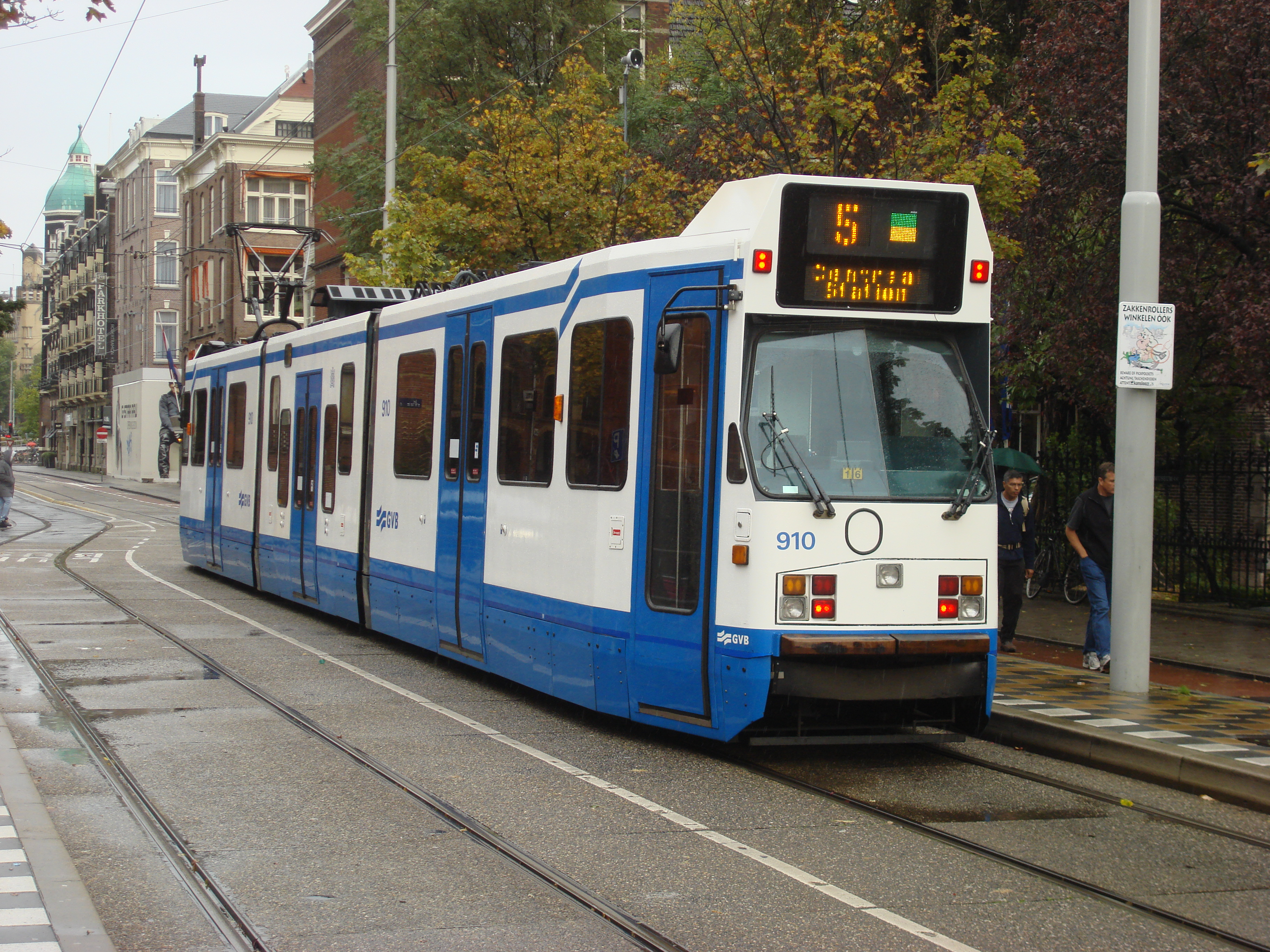
Bidirectional 11G trams served line 5 between 1990 and 2021.

In 2011, tram line 5, running between Centraal and Zuid stations, was the busiest tram line in the city with 42,000 boardings per day.

On 22 July 2018, the opening of the Noord-Zuid metro line resulted in many changes to the Amsterdam tram system, including line 5. At that time, the northern terminal of line 5 was changed to terminate at the Westergasfabriek stop instead of Centraal Station.

On 3 March 2019, Metro line 51 was closed south of Zuid station in order to convert it into tram line 25, that would use low-floor coupled pairs of trams. All stops south of Zuid station would be rebuilt for low-floor trams; however, the De Boelelaan/VU stop was permanently closed. Two stops used by tram 5 (Kronenburg and Zonnestein) were rebuilt below street level. Tram line 5 continued to operate with some temporary bus substitution.

On 27 May 2019, rush-hour tram line 6 was introduced between Amsterdam Zuid station and Amstelveen Stadshart. Because metro line 51 was discontinued and, because the replacement bus service ran non-stop between the former De Boelelaan/VU and Oranjebaan, line 5 became overcrowded. At Zuid station, line 6 trams turned back on Strawinskylaan at using a crossover and turnback siding built in 2016. After 6 November 2020, tram line 6 was discontinued due to low ridership. It was originally scheduled to be replaced by tram line 25 upon the latter's opening on 13 December 2020.

On 9 December 2020, tram line 25 unofficially opened (officially 4 days later on 13 December), and along with line 5, jointly served the stops between Station Zuid (Strawinskylaan) and Oranjebaan.

On 23 March 2021, line 5 became the second GVB line to operate the new 15G trams from CAF, the first being line 25. The trams on line 5 are in the blue-white GVB livery while those on line 25 are in the R-net livery. Both lines 5 and 25 require bidirectional trams. On line 5, the CAF trams replace the older eleven remaining 11G BN trams.

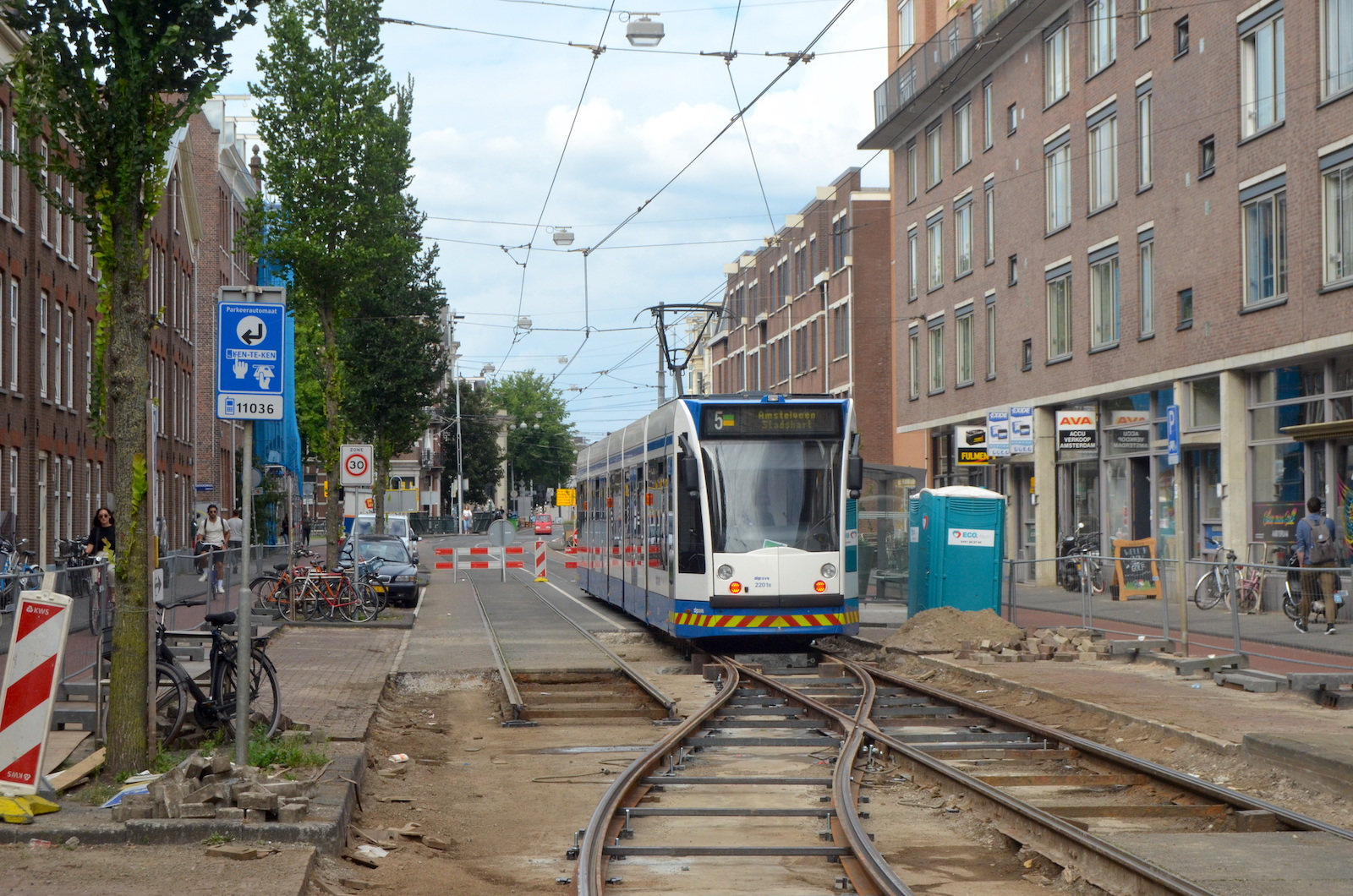
Line 5 tram changing direction at a temporary crossover on Marnixstraat

On 19 August 2020, tram lines 3 and 5 started to divert due to the renewal of the Bullebak bridge over the Brouwersgracht forcing the closure of the Zoutkeetsgracht tram loop. Since then, line 3 has been diverting to the loop on Van Hallstraat at Westergasfabriek, normally the line 5 terminal, and line 5 diverted to a temporary crossover at Eerste Marnixdwarsstraat on Marnixstraat just south of the Bullebak bridge along the normal line 3 route. These diversions were made because the bidirectional line 5 trams can change ends at the temporary crossover while unidirectional line 3 trams could not. On 29 August 2023, the Bullebak bridge renewal was completed and the double-ended trams of line 5 could continue to Zoutkeetsgracht. The single-ended trams of line 3 could still not be used as turning loop at Zoutkeetsgracht was still not available due to construction. The diversion ended on 8 October 2025.
