= Amsterdam Zuid station =

Railway station in Amsterdam, Netherlands

Amsterdam Zuid
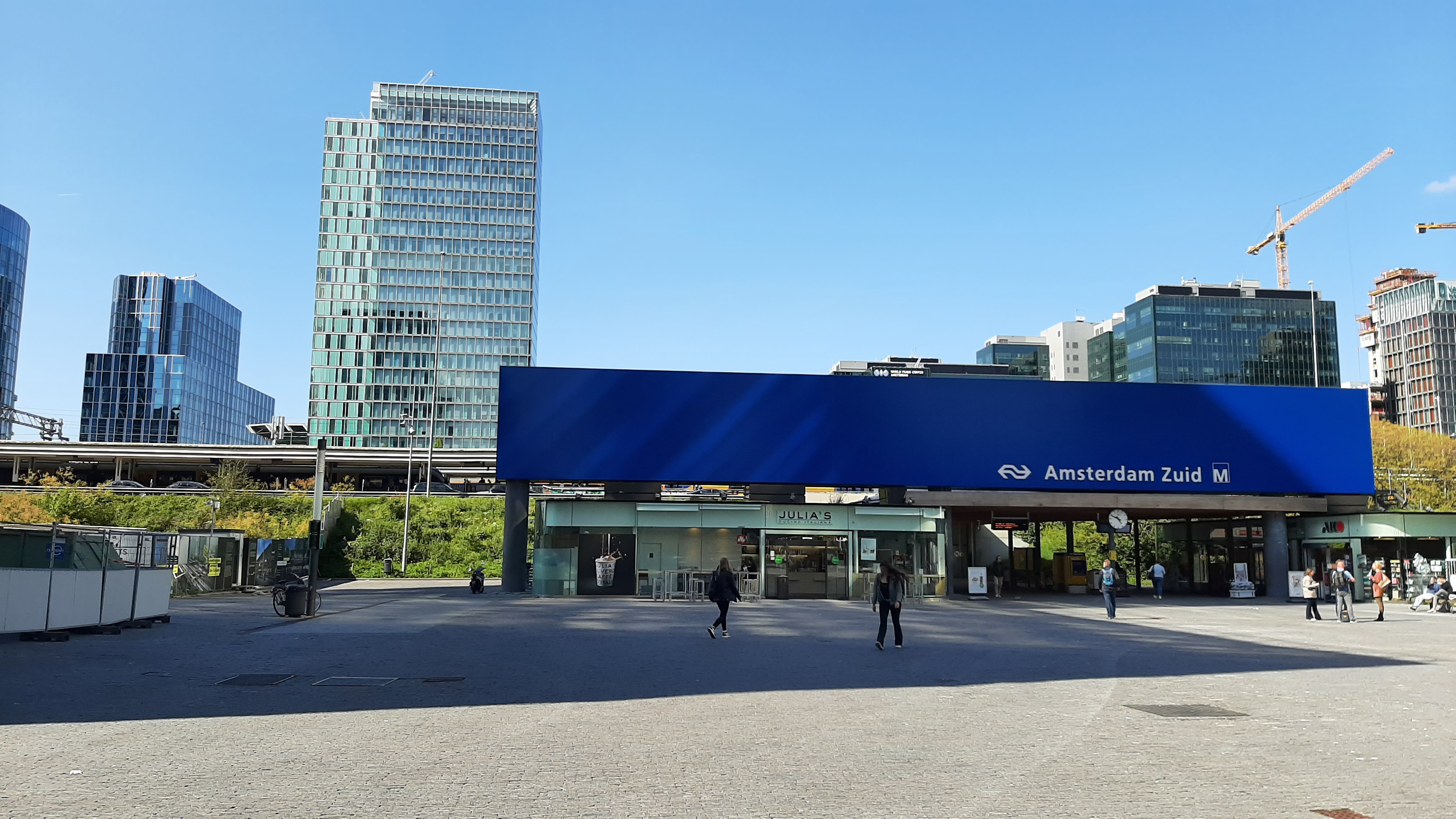
- Gustav Mahlerplein entrance (May 2021)

General information
- Location: Netherlands
- Coordinates: 52°20′20″N 4°52′23″E
- Operator: Nederlandse Spoorwegen
- Line: Weesp–Leiden railway

Construction
- Structure type: Embankment

Other information
- Station code: Asdz

History
- Opened: 21 December 1978; 47 years ago
Services
Preceding station	NS International	Following station
Schiphol Airport towards Brussels-South	Eurocity Direct 9500 Mon-Sat before 20:00	Duivendrecht towards Lelystad Centrum
Schiphol Airport towards Brussels-South	Eurocity Direct 9500 After 20:00 and Sun	Terminus
Preceding station	Nederlandse Spoorwegen	Following station
Schiphol Airport Terminus	NS Intercity 700	Almere Centrum towards Groningen
Schiphol Airport Terminus	NS Intercity 800	Almere Centrum towards Leeuwarden
Schiphol Airport towards Breda	NS Intercity Direct 1800	Duivendrecht towards Amersfoort Schothorst
Schiphol Airport towards Rotterdam Centraal	NS Intercity Direct 2400 Mon-Sat until 20:00	Duivendrecht towards Lelystad Centrum
Schiphol Airport towards Den Haag Centraal	NS Intercity 3100	Amsterdam Bijlmer ArenA towards Nijmegen
Schiphol Airport towards Rotterdam Centraal	NS Intercity 3200 Mon-Thurs before 19:00	Amsterdam Bijlmer ArenA towards Arnhem Centraal
Schiphol Airport towards Dordrecht	NS Intercity 3500	Amsterdam Bijlmer ArenA towards Venlo
Schiphol Airport towards Rotterdam Centraal	NS Intercity Direct 12400 After 20:00 and Sundays	Terminus
Schiphol Airport towards Den Haag Centraal	NS Sprinter 4300	Amsterdam RAI towards Lelystad Centrum
Schiphol Airport towards Leiden Centraal	NS Sprinter 5700 Not after 20:30	Amsterdam RAI towards Utrecht Centraal
Preceding station	Amsterdam Tram	Following station
Prinses Irenestraat towards Westergasfabriek	Line 5	Parnassusweg towards Stadshart
Terminus	Line 25	Parnassusweg towards Uithoorn Centrum
Preceding station	Amsterdam Metro	Following station
Station RAI towards Gein	Line 50	Amstelveenseweg towards Isolatorweg
Station RAI towards Centraal Station	Line 51	Amstelveenseweg towards Isolatorweg
Europaplein towards Noord	Line 52	Terminus
Location
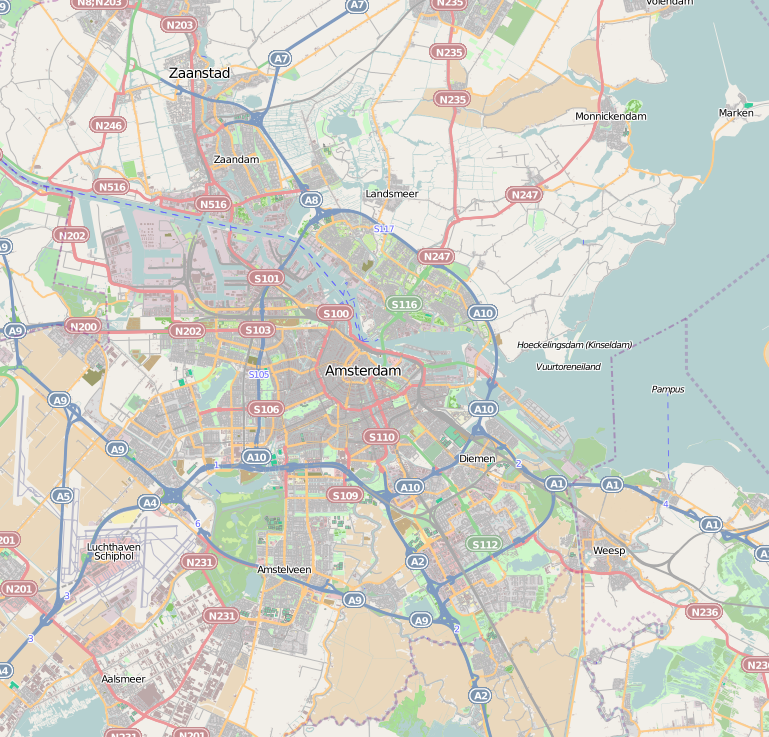
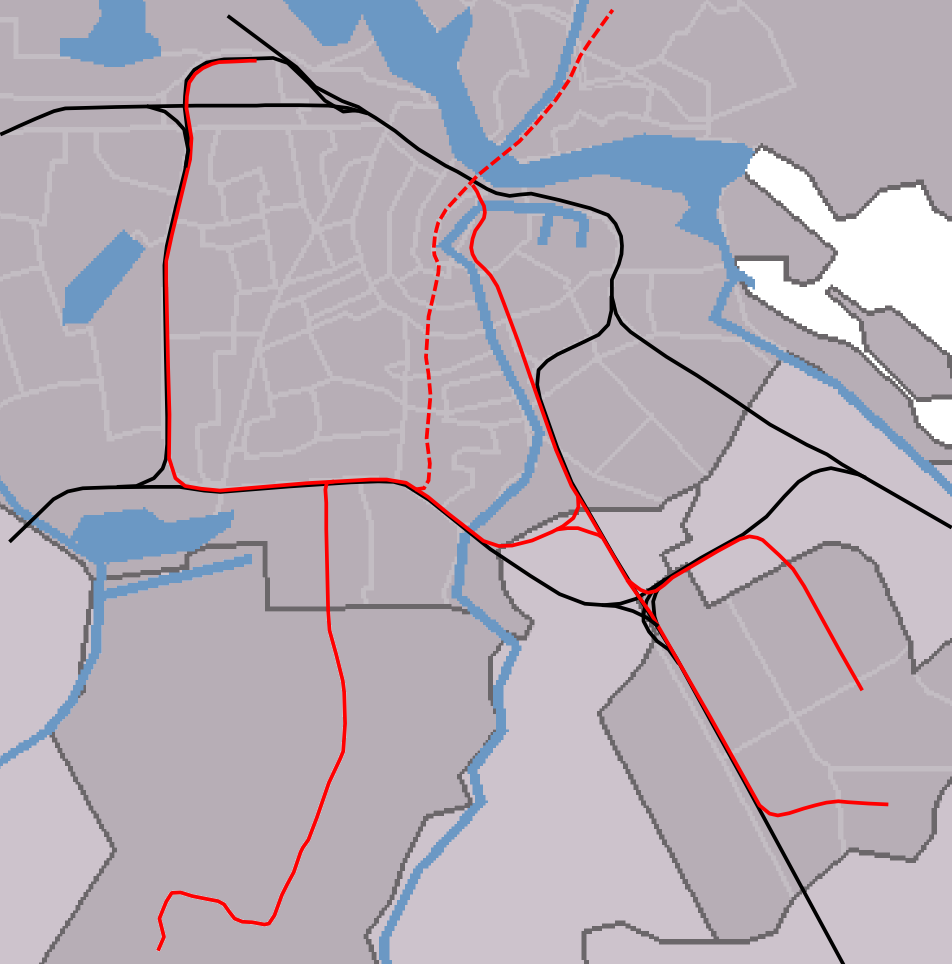
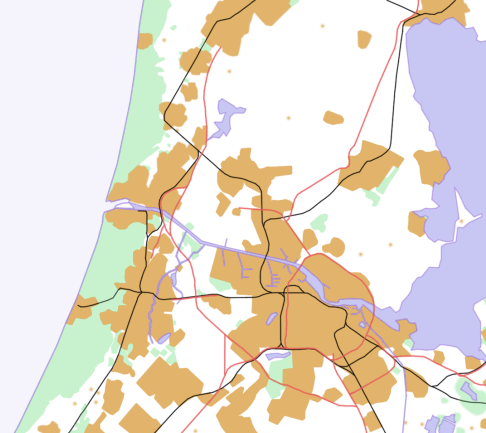
- Location within Greater Amsterdam Location within metro van Amsterdam Location within Northern Randstad Location within Netherlands

Amsterdam Zuid (Dutch pronunciation: [ˌɑmstərdɑm ˈzœyt]; lit. 'Amsterdam South') is a railway station situated in the borough of Amsterdam-Zuid in Amsterdam, Netherlands. For a number of years, it was named Amsterdam Zuid WTC, in reference to the neighbouring World Trade Center Amsterdam. In 2006, in conjunction with the rapid development of the area surrounding the station, the station was enlarged and the reference to the WTC was formally dropped from the name.

As of 2021, Amsterdam Zuid also has a metro station served by 3 lines (50, 51, 52) of the Amsterdam Metro, and two tram stops (Station Zuid and Parnassusweg) served by tram lines 5 and 25.

During 1978, Amsterdam Zuid station opened on a strategic rail route commonly known as the Zuidtak and formed the heart of the modern Zuidas business district, which houses several large banks, accounting and legal firms, as well as being the main public transport gateway for the VU University campus located just south of the station. Over time, the station has played an increasingly important role in Amsterdam's transport strategy and passenger numbers have grown extensively since its opening. To cope with its high patronage, Amsterdam Zuid has been extended and additional services put on; it has effectively replaced the older Amsterdam Centraal station as the capital's main station for direct trains.

During the 2010s, as a means of allowing for further development at the station, a large expansion plan was proposed for Amsterdam Zuid. In December 2014, an agreement for this expansion plan, which has been referred to as the Zuidasdok project, was signed by various public bodies, authorising it to proceed. The publicly funded project has an estimated cost of approximately €1.9 billion; this price tag means it shall be one of the biggest infrastructure projects ever performed in the Netherlands to date. Having received political backing, construction commenced in 2019 and is scheduled for completion around 2028.

== History ==
Amsterdam Zuid station is located in the borough of Amsterdam-Zuid in the city Amsterdam, Netherlands. It lies on the strategic rail route known as the Zuidtak ("south branch"), which was completed in 1993, and connects Amsterdam Schiphol Airport in the west to Weesp, in the east via Duivendrecht. During 1978, the station was opened; over the following decades, Amsterdam Zuid was determined to be the fastest growing station in the Netherlands. As a result, the station was extended during 2006, and has gradually played an increasingly important role in the city's transport strategy. It has replaced the older Amsterdam Centraal station as the capital's main station for direct trains to various destinations located to the north and east of the country.

The station is also on HSL-Zuid, a dedicated high-speed line designed for long distance and international traffic, which was built between 2000 and 2007. In the long-term, it has been anticipated that at some point in the future Amsterdam Zuid will be served by long-distance trains traversing HSL-Zuid.

Since 2006, Utrecht and other cities south of Amsterdam have also been served via Amsterdam Zuid. In that year, the Utrechtboog flyover was completed; as a result of this additional infrastructure, changes at Duivendrecht are no longer necessary for passengers from Schiphol to Utrecht and beyond. These routes from Schiphol therefore bypass the congested lines serving Central Amsterdam, allowing faster connections between Amsterdam Airport Schiphol and cities in the north and east of the country (Leeuwarden and Enschede, among others).

The number of train services to handle passenger demands has been progressively increased over time. However, the official long-term projections of future passenger numbers have been reported to be expected to increase to an extent to which the station's current facilities shall be insufficient to properly accommodate the corresponding traffic. While heavy demands would naturally necessitate a further expansion of the station, it stands in the central reservation of the A10 motorway ring road, which leaves no space for conventional surface expansion.

=== Metro history at Zuid ===
Amsterdam Zuid is served by Amsterdam Metro lines 50, 51, and 52. Opened in 1997, line 50 runs next to the railway line from Isolatorweg to Gein. Line 51 was opened in 1990 as a hybrid metro/sneltram line; it ran as a metro using the third rail from Centraal Station to Zuid, and then as a sneltram (light-rail) line using pantographs south of Zuid to Poortwachter in Amstelveen sharing the rails with tram line 5. In 2004, line 51 was extended further south to Amstelveen Westwijk. In March 2019, line 51 was redirected to Isolatorweg station, and the light-rail portion south of Zuid station was rebuilt as tram line 25. Line 52 opened in July 2018, and connects Amsterdam North via Centraal station to this station.

=== Tram history at Zuid ===
Between 1978 and 1990, the Station Zuid tram stop was Tram line 5's southern terminus, and it was located on Zuidplein, the public square in front of the station. From 1990 to 2008, the tram stop was integrated into the Zuid Metro station. In May 2008, in order to make room for the construction of the north–south line (metro line 52), the tram stop was relocated to Strawinskylaan.

In 2016, the Station Zuid tram stop on Strawinskylaan was redesigned in preparation for the conversion of metro line 51 south of Zuid station from a hybrid metro/sneltram line into tram line 25. The work including adding a turnback track and crossover east of the stop to turn back bidirectional trams. In the summer of 2020, the platforms at the nearby Parnassusweg tram stop were lengthened in order to handle the coupled pairs of trams to be used on tram line 25. The Parnassusweg stop provides an alternative means of accessing the Zuid railway station, and tram line 25 uses this stop to relieve crowding at the Station Zuid tram stop on Strawinskylaan. Line 25 opened officially on 13 December 2020, unofficially 4 days earlier on 9 December. Both tram lines 5 and 25 serve the Station Zuid and Parnassusweg tram stops.

The Station Zuid tram stop on Strawinskylaan is a temporary terminal for line 25. As a terminal, it lacks rest facilities for tram operators and the space to store multiple pairs of coupled trams in case there a breakdown along the line. The existing stop would not be able to handle large crowds of riders. The permanent line 25 stop for Station Zuid will be a new tram station along Arnold Schönberglaan on the south side of the station, which is expected to open in 2028 after the completion of major renovations at the railway station and work to relocate the adjacent A10 motorway (eastbound lanes) underground.

== Expansion plans ==
Following studies into various alternative means to providing greater capacity at Amsterdam Zuid, it was determined that the best likely option would involve the rerouting of the adjacent part of the A10 ring road. During December 2014, an agreement between the Ministry of Infrastructure and Water Management, the City of Amsterdam, the Amsterdam Metropolitan Region and the province of North Holland was signed to cover the proposed expansion work, which is referred to as the Zuidasdok project. The programme is to be jointly executed by Rijkswaterstaat, the City of Amsterdam, ProRail, the province of North Holland and Amsterdam Region Transport. The project carries an estimated cost of approximately €1.9 billion, which makes it one of the biggest infrastructure projects in the history of the Netherlands so far. It is being publicly funded by a combination of the Dutch State, the City of Amsterdam, Vervoerregio Amsterdam, and the province of North Holland, along with additional investments that are being made by the Dutch Railways (NS).

During March 2017, a contract to perform the design and construction of the Zuidasdok project was awarded to ZuidPlus, a joint venture between Fluor, Heijmans and Hochtief. The consortium's architectural design team includes Team V Architecture, Zwarts & Jansma Architects and Bosch Slabbers Garden & Landscape Architects. Engineering firm Technolution is to perform system engineering, as well as to provide systems for control and monitoring purposes, including the user interface for the tunnel installation. Rijkswaterstaat has been engaged by ProRail and the municipality of Amsterdam for the purposes of managing the project's procurement. Being sufficiently financed and having received political acceptance, construction activities is anticipated to commence during 2019 and is scheduled for completion in 2028.

In the Zuidasdok project, the approach for relocating the southern (eastbound) carriageway of the A10 currently traversing the site is to put it in tunnels, thereby opening up the surface space required to develop a high-quality and compact intermodal transport station. The expansion programme aims to improve traffic flow within the station, create a modern transport hub for the city, and stimulate new urban developments. Elements of the local public transport infrastructure are to be redeveloped to better accommodate these aims and the station's overall purpose.

As envisioned, the expanded station will feature a light and elegant design intended to blend well with its surroundings. Modifications are to be made as to enable faster transfers between the numerous train, metro, tram and bus services running through the station. The Minerva Passage, a subway linking the northern and southern sides of Amsterdam's Southern Axis, will be widened while a new underpass, known as the Britten Passage after Benjamin Britten, will also be built. The project will also create space next to the station for new bus and tram stops, bicycle parking facilities, and lots for taxis and park & ride facilities to enable quick and comfortable transfers.

All of the existing mainline platforms are to be widened and reroofed. The metro platforms east of Minerva Passage are to be moved to a central position between the (future) Britten and the Minerva subways to improve passenger flow through the passages. The new station will have four mainline tracks (plus room to add a further pair of tracks), and four metro tracks, including the double tracks used by the Noord-Zuid metro line.

== Services ==
=== Train services ===
In recent years, Station Zuid has become a major station. In December 2006, the extension of the station, including the new platforms 3 and 4, was opened. Trains are operated by Nederlandse Spoorwegen.

As of 15 December 2024, the following train services call at this station:

- International service
  - Eurocity Direct: Brussel Zuid – Antwerpen – Rotterdam – Schiphol – Amsterdam Zuid – Almere – Lelystad
- Express services
  - Intercity Direct: Breda – Rotterdam – Schiphol – Amsterdam Zuid – Duivendrecht – Hilversum – Amersfoort – Amersfoort Schothorst
  - Intercity Direct: Rotterdam – Schiphol – Amsterdam Zuid – Duivendrecht – Almere – Lelystad
  - Intercity: Schiphol – Amsterdam Zuid – Almere – Lelystad – Zwolle – Assen – Groningen
  - Intercity: Schiphol – Amsterdam Zuid – Almere – Lelystad – Zwolle – Meppel – Steenwijk – Heerenveen – Leeuwarden
  - Intercity: The Hague Central – Leiden – Schiphol – Amsterdam Zuid – Amsterdam Bijlmer ArenA – Utrecht – Driebergen-Zeist – Ede-Wageningen – Arnhem – Nijmegen
  - Intercity: Dordrecht – Rotterdam – Schiedam – Delft – The Hague HS – Leiden – Schiphol – Amsterdam Zuid – Amsterdam Bijlmer ArenA – Utrecht – 's-Hertogenbosch – Eindhoven – Helmond – Deurne – Horst Sevenum – Blerick – Venlo
  - Intercity: Rotterdam – Delft – The Hague HS – Leiden – Schiphol – Amsterdam Zuid – Amsterdam Bijlmer ArenA – Utrecht – Ede-Wageningen – Arnhem
- Local services
  - Sprinter: The Hague Central – Leiden – Hoofddorp – Schiphol – Amsterdam Zuid – Duivendrecht – Weesp – Almere – Lelystad
  - Sprinter: (Leiden –) Hoofddorp – Schiphol – Amsterdam Zuid – Duivendrecht – Weesp – Naarden Bussum – Hilversum – Utrecht

=== Metro services ===
Amsterdam Zuid is served by lines 50, 51 and 52. Line 50 runs next to the railway line from Isolatorweg via Zuid to Gein. Line 51 runs from Centraal Station via Zuid to Isolatorweg. Line 52 connects Amsterdam North via Centraal station to this station.

- 50 Isolatorweg - Sloterdijk - Lelylaan - Zuid - RAI - Duivendrecht - Bijlmer ArenA - Holendrecht - Gein
- 51 Central Station - Amstel - RAI - Zuid - Lelylaan - Sloterdijk - Isolatorweg
- 52 Noord - Noorderpark - Central Station - Rokin - Vijzelgracht - De Pijp - Europaplein - Zuid

=== Tram service ===
GVB operates two tram lines to the Zuid station at two tram stops. The Station Zuid tram stop is located on Strawinskylaan on the north side of the station across from Zuidplein, the public square in front of the station. Bus services stop nearby. Located along its namesake street, the Parnassusweg tram stop is located at the western end of the railway station platforms, about 400 metres (1,300 ft) from the station.

- 5 Westergasfabriek - Elandsgracht - Leidseplein - Museumplein - Station Zuid - A.J. Ernststraat - Amstelveen Stadshart
- 25 Station Zuid - A.J. Ernststraat - Amstelveen Westwijk - Uithoorn Centrum

=== Bus services ===
Bus services the bus station located at the Strawinskylaan, 200m north of the station.

These are city services, operated by GVB.

- 15 Station Zuid - Haarlemmermeerstation - Surinameplein - Mercatorplein - Bos en Lommer - Station Sloterdijk
- 62 Amstelstation - Station RAI - Station Zuid - Station Lelylaan
- 65 Station Zuid - Rivierenbuurt - Amstelstation - Watergraafsmeer - KNSM Island

These are urban/regional services operated by Connexxion and Transdev.

- 321 Station Zuid - VU Medical Centre - Muiden - Huizen
- 341 Station Zuid - VU Medical Centre - Schiphol Airport - Hoofddorp railway station - Hoofddorp Centre - Hoofddorp, Spaarne Gasthuis
- 346 Station Zuid - VU Medical Centre - Haarlem
- 348 Station Zuid - VU Medical Centre - Amstelveen - Uithoorn busstation
- 358 Station Zuid - VU Medical Centre - Amstelveen - Aalsmeer - Kudelstaart

== Gallery ==
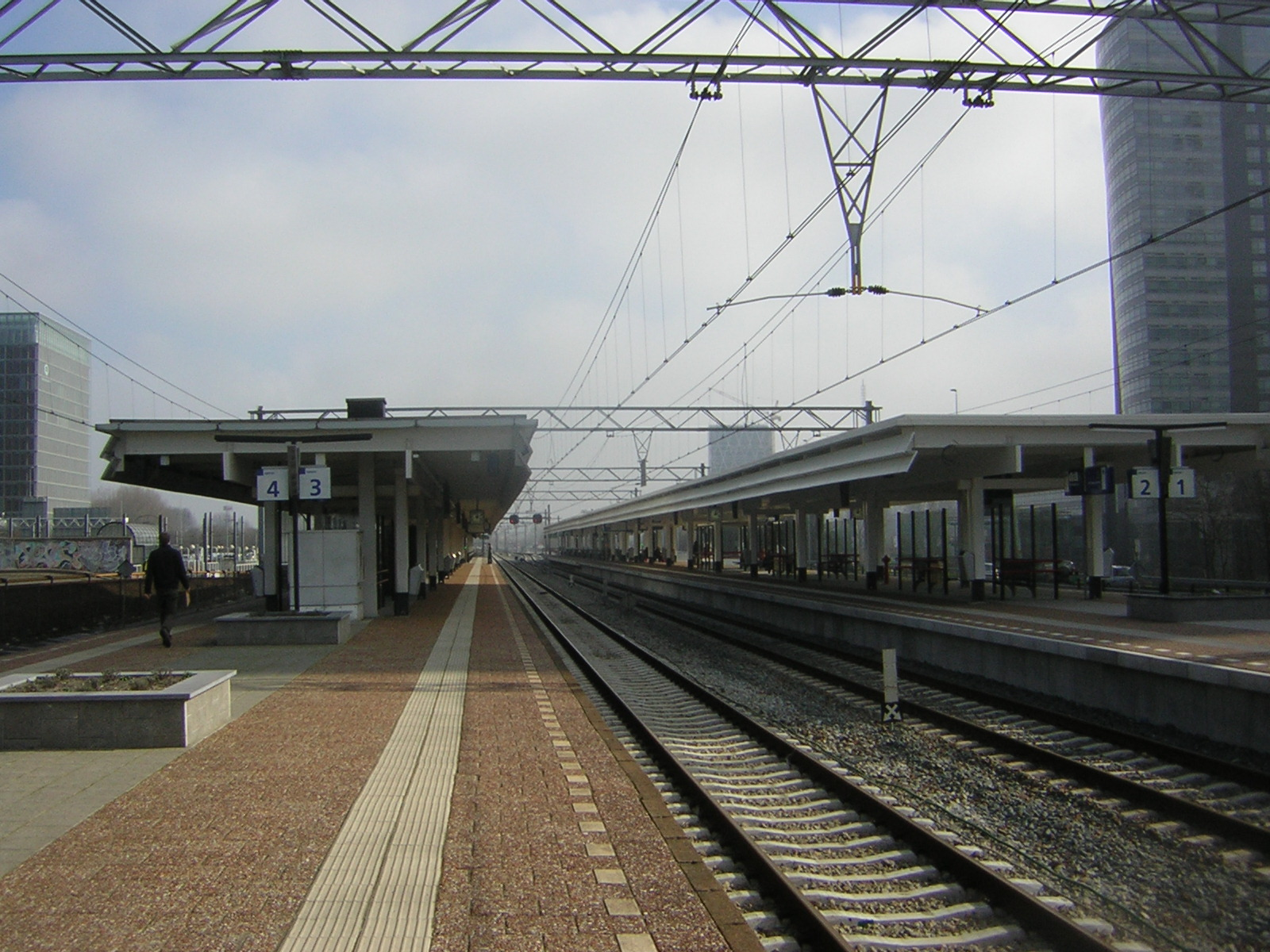
Overview of the station. To the right of the station, the HQ of ABN Amro is just visible.

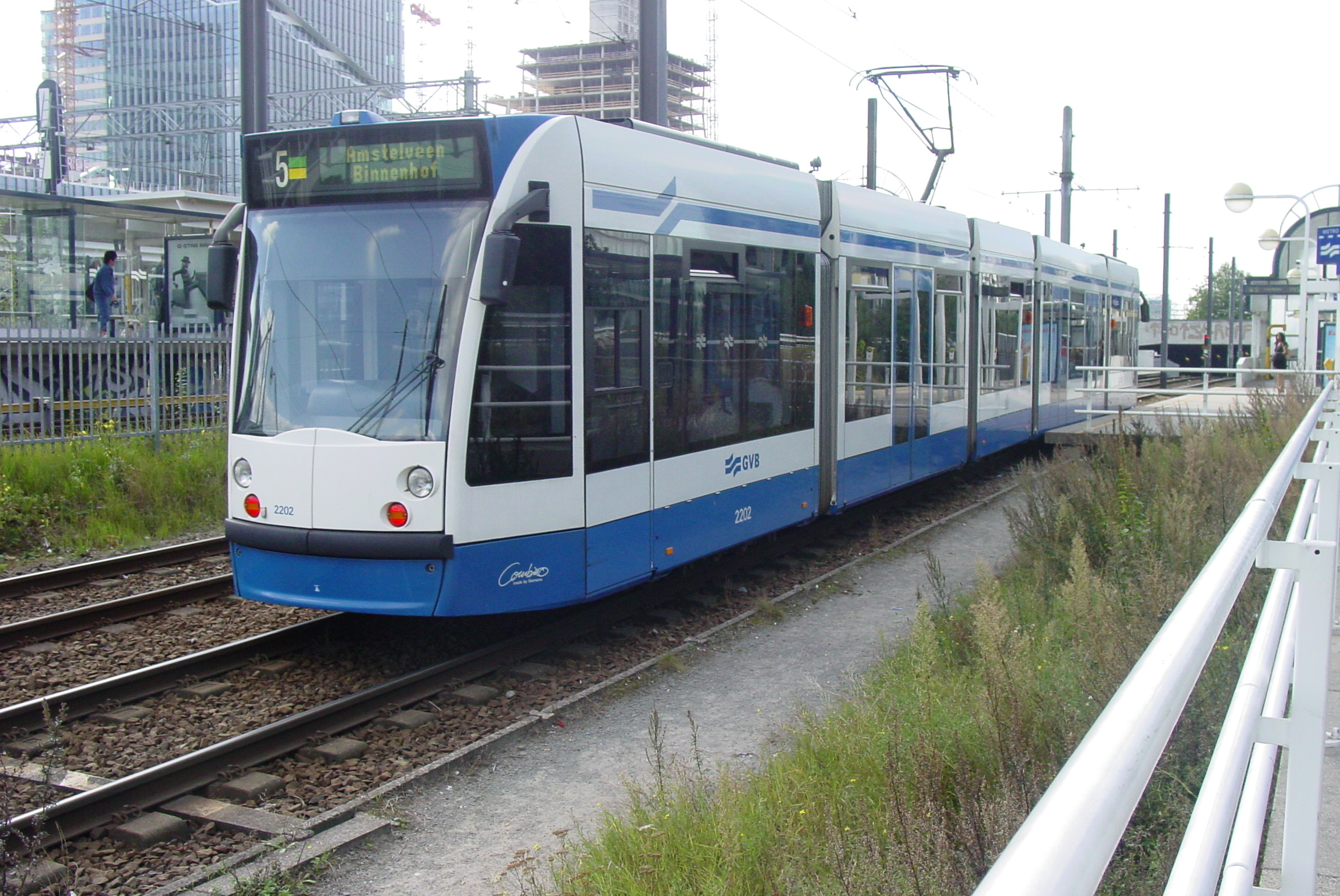
Combino tram at Amsterdam Zuid station. Note that this photo was taken when trams still had their stop inside the station, rather than the current two stops just outside.

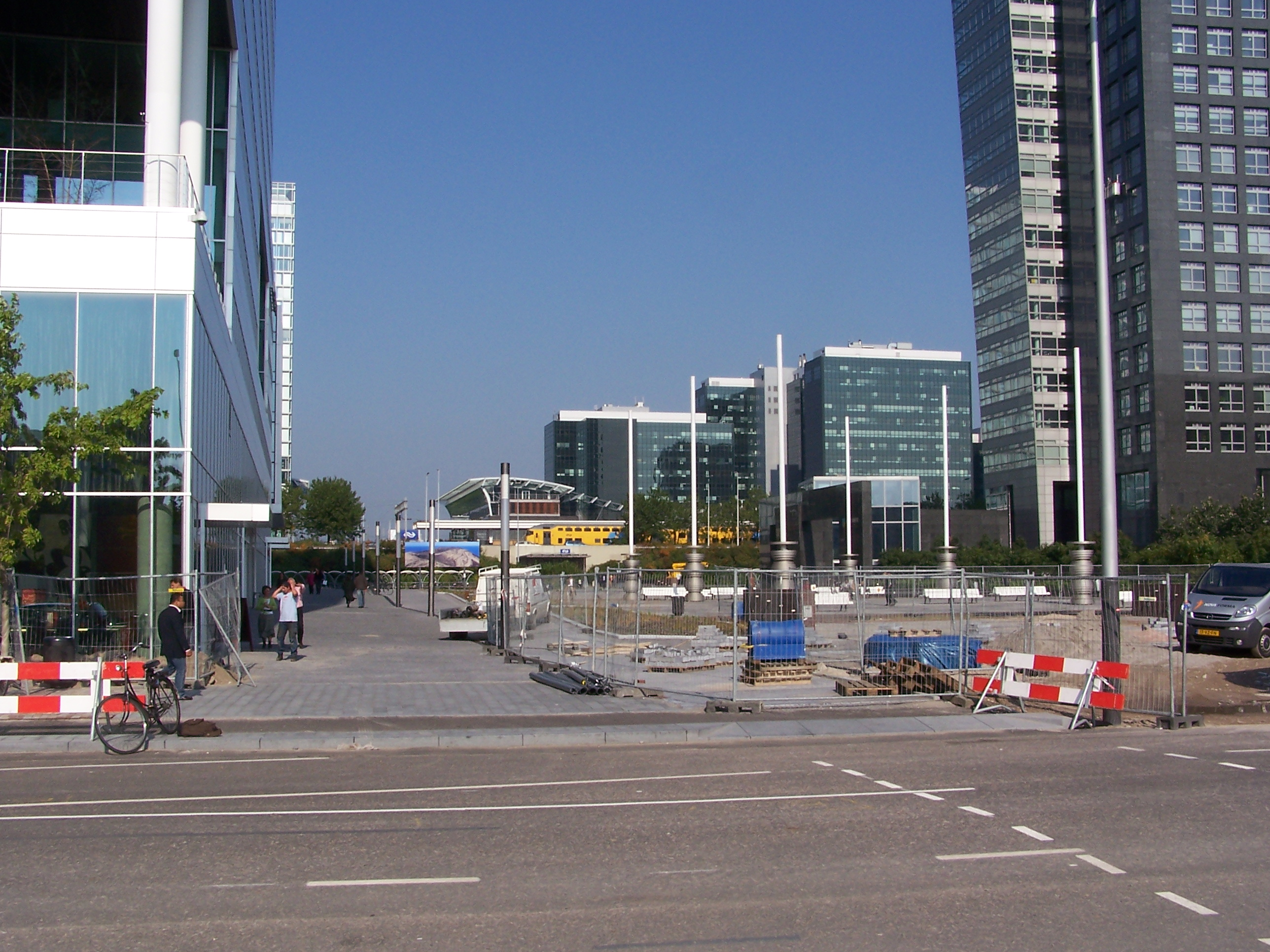
View of the station from between the Zuidas offices.
