= Westergasfabriek =

Gasworks in Amsterdam, the Netherlands

Coordinates: 52°23′12″N 4°52′15″E

The Westergasfabriek is a former gasworks in Amsterdam, the Netherlands, now used as a cultural venue.

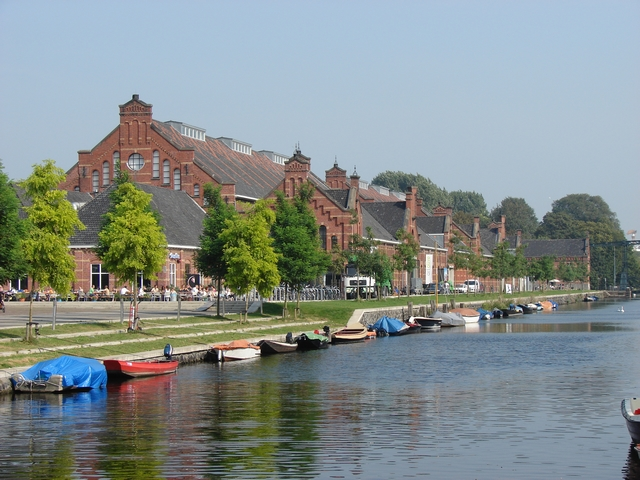
Side of the Westergasfabriek

== History ==
In the 19th century the Imperial Continental Gas Association (ICGA) built four coal gas plants in Amsterdam: the Eastern Gas Factory, the Western Gas Factory, the Northern and the Southern. Westergasfabriek was ready in 1885 and was strategically situated between the Haarlemmer trekvaart, and the first railway line in the Netherlands. In 1885 it was the largest gas extraction plant in the Netherlands. The gas was extracted from coal and was used for street lighting. Because of the higher gas prices the City of Amsterdam took over the operation in 1898 and expanded the plant. The plant was perfectly situated between the water and the railway line but gas production was very successful. The big Gasholder was built in 1902. The gas factory produced gas for the city until the late fifties. Amsterdam went over to gas from Hoogovens in IJmuiden, so the production of coal gas from the Factory decreased. In the sixties natural gas was found in Slochteren in the North of the Netherlands. This is why in 1967 the production of gas from the factory stopped permanently.

After the Western Gas Factory closed, the Amsterdam Electricity and Gas Company (GEB) destroyed some of the buildings, among them the gas plant itself and the water tower. The other buildings were used for storage and repair and as laboratories and workshops. The remaining buildings were recognised as monuments in 1989. In 1992 the GEB left the buildings and they were taken over by the District Council of Westerpark.

== Redevelopment ==
Most of the thirteen buildings on site were designed by architect Isaac Gosschalk in the Dutch Neo Renaissance style, popular in the Netherlands between 1870 and 1915. Gosschalk was a famous architect in his time, as famous as Pierre Cuypers and Dolf van Gendt. He was a Jewish architect and he mainly built factories among them the Heineken brewery which is unfortunately completely destroyed and the railway station of Groningen. Gosschalk united the functional nature of the buildings with the beauty of architecture. Symmetry played an important role in his design. Nineteen of the original buildings remain on the site (not all by Gosschalk) and are designated as national monuments. In the eighties the City of Amsterdam started to think about redevelopment but found out that the site was heavily polluted. In the nineties the District Council of Westerpark took over the responsibilities for the redevelopment. There were four main problems: remediation of the pollution, constructing a new park, finding new use for the derelict buildings and the overall problem: a lack of money.

== Culture Park ==
The gas works were re-opened as the "Culture Park Westergasfabriek" in 2003. Its television studios host programmes like Pauw & Witteman (a former late night talkshow), De Wereld Draait Door (an early evening talk show with Matthijs van Nieuwkerk) and Eva Jinek's Sunday morning talk show. The main grass field of the park allows for six festivals to be organized annually. Thousands of people visit the park and its activities every day.
