= Gondel tram stop =

Tram stop in Amstelveen, Netherlands

Gondel

General information
- Location: near Beneluxbaan and Gondel, Amstelveen; Netherlands
- Coordinates: 52°17′4.2″N 4°51′33.5″E

History
- Opened: 2 December 1990
- Closed: 3 March 2019

Former services
Preceding station	Amsterdam Metro	Following station
Marne towards Centraal Station	Line 51	Meent towards Westwijk
Location
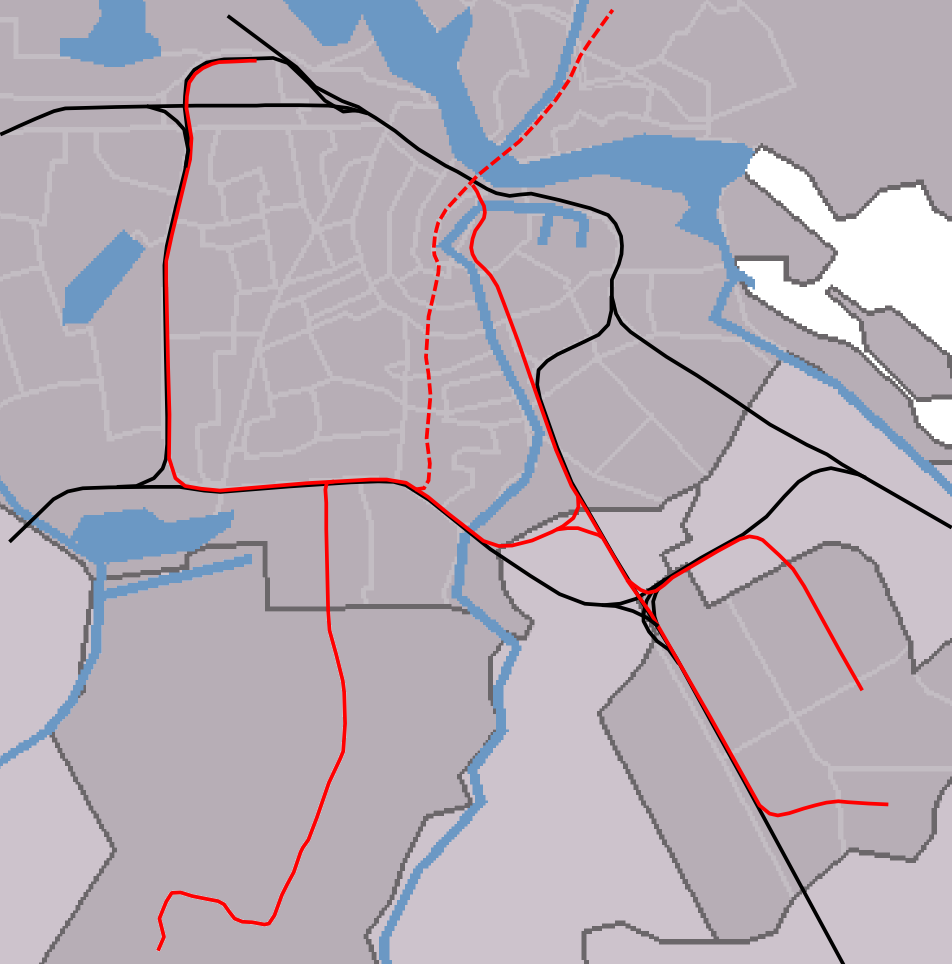
- Location within metro van Amsterdam

Gondel was a metro station in Amstelveen on metro line 51, a hybrid metro/sneltram (light rail) route that used high-floor trams. The station closed on 3 March 2019 and was subsequently demolished. After closure, the metro line south of Amsterdam Zuid station, often called the Amstelveenlijn, was converted for low-floor trams. Today, there is no tram stop at the site. Since its opening in 9 December 2020, the trams of line 25 have been bypassing the site without stopping.

In order to increase reliability and reduce travel time on the rebuilt line, five line 51 stations, including Gondel, were demolished instead of being rebuilt as stops for low-floor trams. The former metro station site is 350 metres (1,150 ft) from the rebuilt Meent tram stop and 800 metres (2,600 ft) from the Sportlaan tram stop. Gondel used to serve the Waardhuizen and Middenhoven residential areas.
