= S3/M4 (Amsterdam Metro) =

Series of electric multiple unit

CAF S3/M4
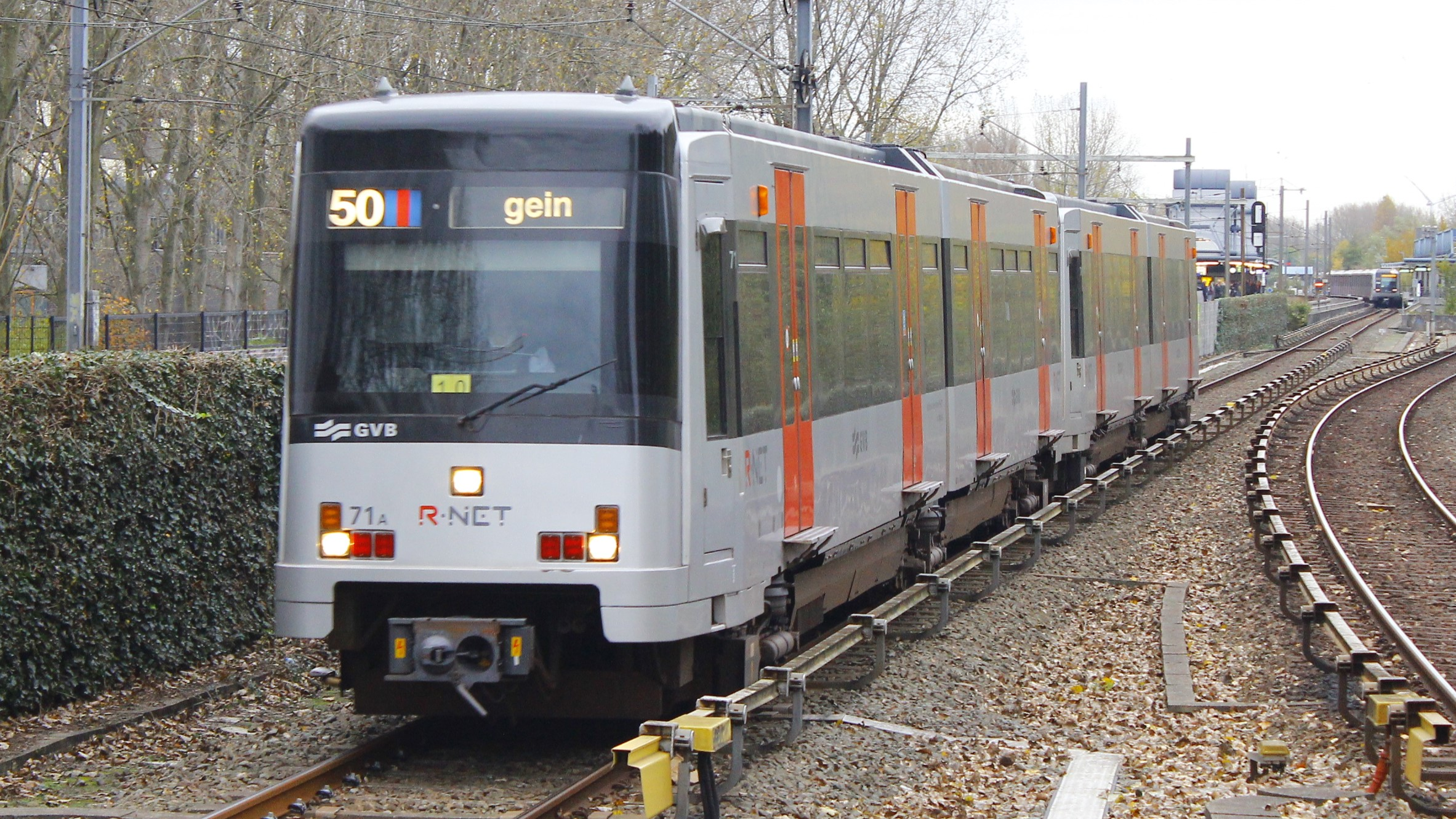
- S3/M4 stock of the Amsterdam Metro, 15 November 2022
- Stock type: Electric multiple unit
- Manufacturer: CAF
- Built at: Beasain, Spain
- Replaced: LHB M1/M2/M3
- Constructed: 1996–1997
- Number built: S3: 4 vehicles M4: 33 vehicles
- Formation: 3 cars per trainset Mk + Fs
- Fleet numbers: S3: 70–73; M4: 74–106
- Capacity: Before renovation: 66 (seating), 184 (standing); After renovation: 58 (seating), 192 (standing)
- Operators: Amsterdam Metro
- Lines served: Line 50; Line 51; Line 53; Line 54

Specifications
- Train length: 30.9 m (101 ft 5 in)
- Width: 2.65 m (8 ft 8 in) / 30.0 m (98 ft 5 in)
- Doors: 4 doors per side
- Maximum speed: 70 km/h (45 mph)
- Weight: S3: 48 tonnes (106,000 lb); M4: 47 tonnes (104,000 lb)
- Traction system: Holec IGBT-VVVF
- Power output: 6 × 70 kW
- Acceleration: 1.3 m/s^{2} (4.7 km/(h⋅s))
- Deceleration: Service: 1.5 m/s^{2} (5.4 km/(h⋅s)) Emergency: 1.96 m/s^{2} (7.1 km/(h⋅s))
- Electric system(s): Third rail: 750 V DC; Overhead line: 600 V DC
- Current collection: Contact shoe and Pantograph
- UIC classification: Bo′+Bo′+Bo′
- Track gauge: 1,435 mm (4 ft 8 1/2 in)

The CAF S3/M4 is a series of electric multiple unit (EMU) train operated by Amsterdam Metro, with car numbers 70-73 (S3) and 74-106 (M4). This train was built by CAF in Beasain, Basque Country (Spain) and delivered in 1996-1997. These are metro/light rail vehicles with a length of 30.90 meters and a width of 2.65 meters, consisting of two car bodies resting on two regular bogies and one Jacobs bogie. Since April 2024, this rolling stock has been the oldest operational metro generation in the Netherlands.

== Layout and deployment ==
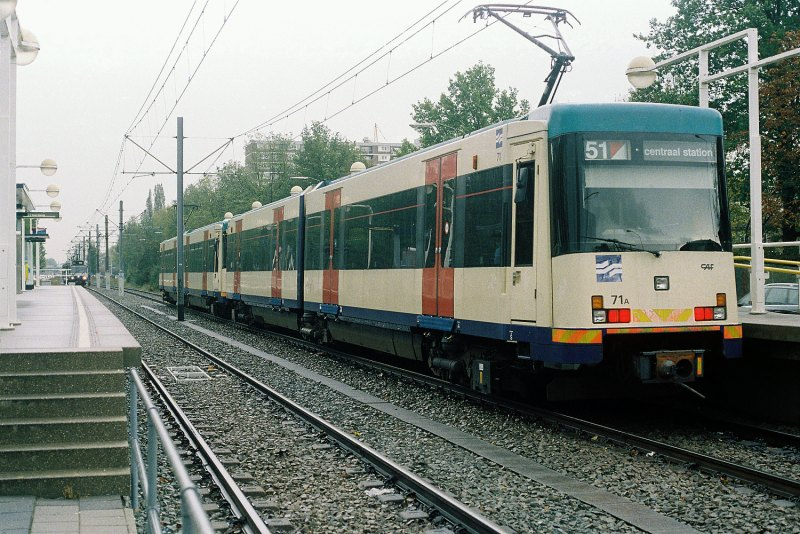
S3 light rail train in the original livery at Sportlaan stop, 2000

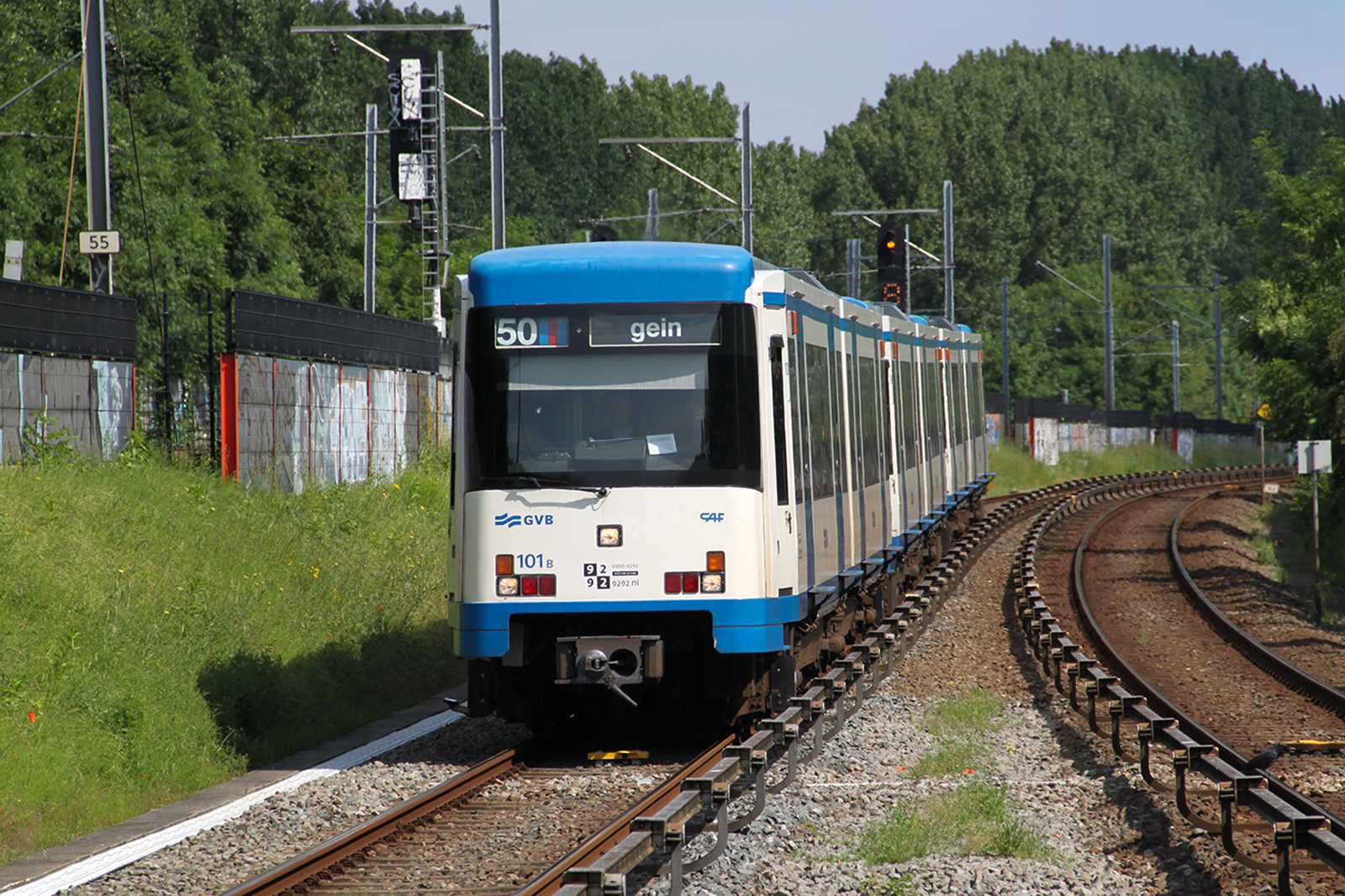
M4 metro train in the white and blue livery at Postjesweg station

The trains were acquired for the Ring Line 50 (Isolatorweg – Zuid – Bijlmer – Gein). Power is collected via the third rail using a contact shoe. Unlike the S1/S2 trains, which had foldable steps along the entire length of the carriages, these carriages only have foldable steps at the doors. These steps were fixed in place after the platforms on the western branch were narrowed, except for units 70-73, which retained them until March 2019 due to their deployment on the Amstelveen line. Like the 11G trams and the S1/S2 metro trains, they feature foot controls. The units 70-73, which form the S3 subset, are equipped with a single half-pantograph for overhead lines, allowing them to also operate on metro/rapid transit Line 51. The M4 has a small pantograph, which is only used for shunting within the premises of the Main Workshop. Additionally, the S3 units have side mirrors on the cab doors, a feature absent in the M4. These carriages also operated briefly on Line 53, but due to vandalism and the shared rolling stock schedule with Line 54, they were only sporadically used on these lines, primarily when M1/M2/M3 metro trains were unavailable. Since 2015, their deployment on Line 53 and Line 54 has become daily, with two or three sets in operation. On the East Line (Oostlijn), a maximum of five sets can fit along the platform, while on Line 50, the maximum is four sets. Technically, up to five sets can be coupled and fit along the platform, but in practice, a train consists of a maximum of three sets.

To create more standing room, individual seats were installed on one side instead of two rows of double seats on either side of the aisle. Notably, although all sets are identical, in some carriages the single seats are on the left side, while in others they are on the right side (reversed on the return journey). This is because, upon delivery, some carriages were positioned in reverse on the trailer, and it was not decided to realign them (which could easily have been done using the turntable at Spaklerweg). Due to the limited number of seats caused by the single seats, it was decided to install only four doors per side instead of six, as seen in other Amsterdam metro trains. This has resulted in slower passenger flow.

Due to issues with obtaining parts for the gearboxes, not all sets are always available, leading to the operation of shorter trains. The GVB and CAF disagree on who should bear the costs for these issues.

== Changes ==
Originally, the double seats were arranged in a face-to-face compartment layout, but since 2004, they have been reupholstered and rearranged in a row. Additionally, the seats were replaced with a new type (featuring a blue GVB livery), and the floor was covered with gray carpeting. Units 70-73 retained their original interior the longest, but the compartment-style seating was maintained under the seats where a sandbox was installed. Like the series 45-69, all carriages are equipped with a bicycle rack with space for two bicycles. Furthermore, the door handles have been replaced with a different type.

The most noticeable change is the color scheme; in 2004, set 90 was the first to receive the new white/blue livery. Starting in 2006, the remaining metro and rapid transit sets were updated. From 2009, a large sticker with the text "deze metro rijdt op groene stroom" (this metro runs on green energy) was applied to the sides of the carriages. By the end of 2011, the front and rear ends were adorned with a 9292OV sticker.

In the spring of 2015, the rapid transit trains (70-73) operating on the Amstelveen Line were fitted with red/yellow warning stripes on the front and rear. These were also applied to the trams on tram line 5.

In 2015, the refurbishment of the M4 train sets began, followed by the S3 sets, to accommodate the new signaling system, which had already been installed on the Isolatorweg – Amstelveenseweg route. The trains were also prepared for semi-automatic operation, which was to be introduced by the end of 2015. The modified sets can be identified by two black antennas on the roof above both driver cabins and two cabinets inside the carriages, directly behind the driver cabins. To make room for these cabinets, two double seats were removed behind each driver cabin.

Between 2016 and 2019, all train sets underwent a refurbishment. Among other changes, the seats were replaced with a new type of plastic seat, similar to those used in the new M5 train sets. Additionally, all 37 sets received the same color scheme of silver-gray, red, and black as the M5 sets, and were fitted with decals conforming to the R-net branding. For the S3 sets, the side mirrors on the cab doors were also removed. Since March 3, 2019, the S3 train sets are no longer used as rapid transit trams.

== Test ride on North/South Line ==
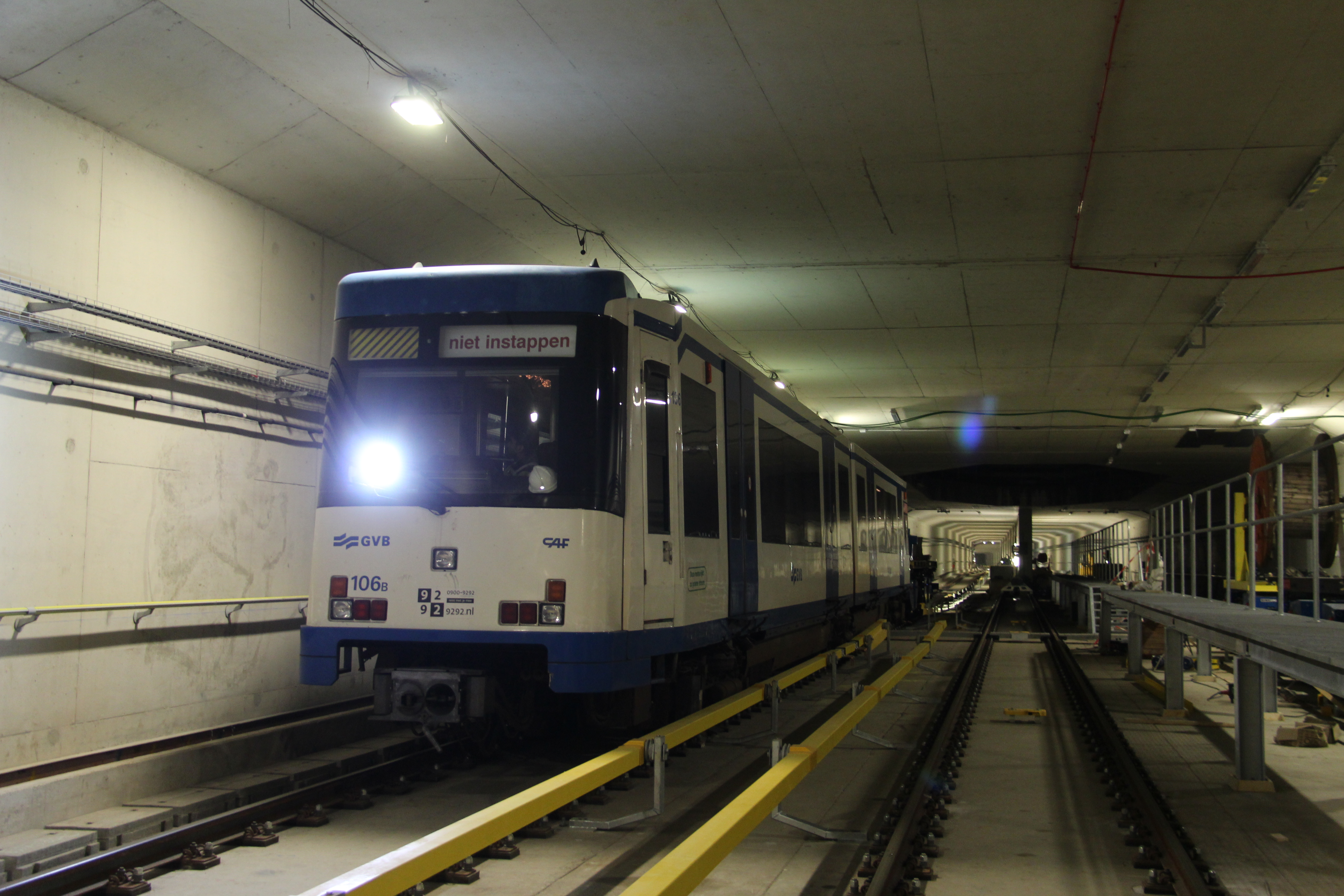
Set 106 during a test run on Line 52, October 2015

On the night of April 10 to 11, 2015, M4 set 76 was transferred to Amsterdam-Noord for the initial testing of various safety and ICT systems that will be used for the North/South Line (Line 52), scheduled to open in 2018. To this end, the carriage was equipped with all necessary hardware and software. All carriages will eventually be fitted with this equipment. The carriage conducted test runs between the storage yard at Noord and Sixhaven station, though it was not yet capable of operating under its own power.

On the night of October 25 to 26, 2015, a metro set was placed on the tracks in Line 52 tunnel for the first time. M4 set 106 was pulled into the tunnel from Zuid station. This set was used to test the train signaling systems in the tunnels over a period of 10 days. The testing was conducted in the same manner as the tests carried out in Noord in April 2015. The metro did not run under its own power but was instead pushed and pulled by a specialized vehicle.

Actual deployment of this rolling stock on Line 52 after its completion is not planned.

== Replacement ==
Due to the introduction of the new M7 trains, a portion of the 35 remaining sets has become redundant and has been taken out of service. On July 11, 2024, it was announced that GVB has ordered an additional 11 to 13 new M7 sets to fully replace the remaining operational trains.

== Disposal ==
In 2022, sets 82 and 85 were sidelined as donor trains for spare parts and were ultimately withdrawn from service in 2023.

== Gallery ==
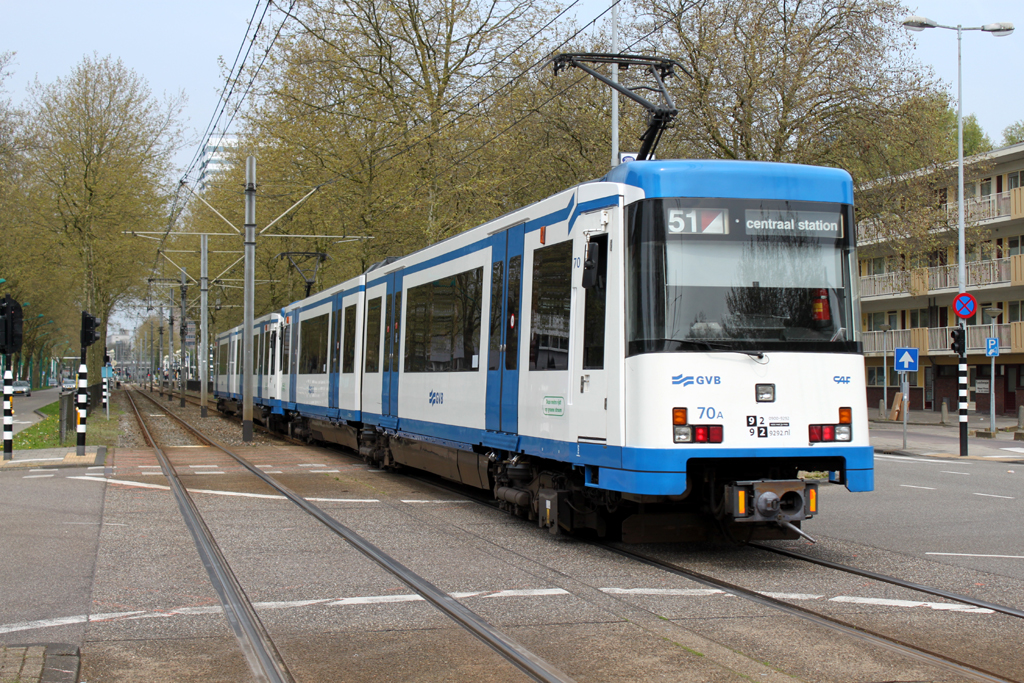
S3-set 70 at AJ Ernststraat stop

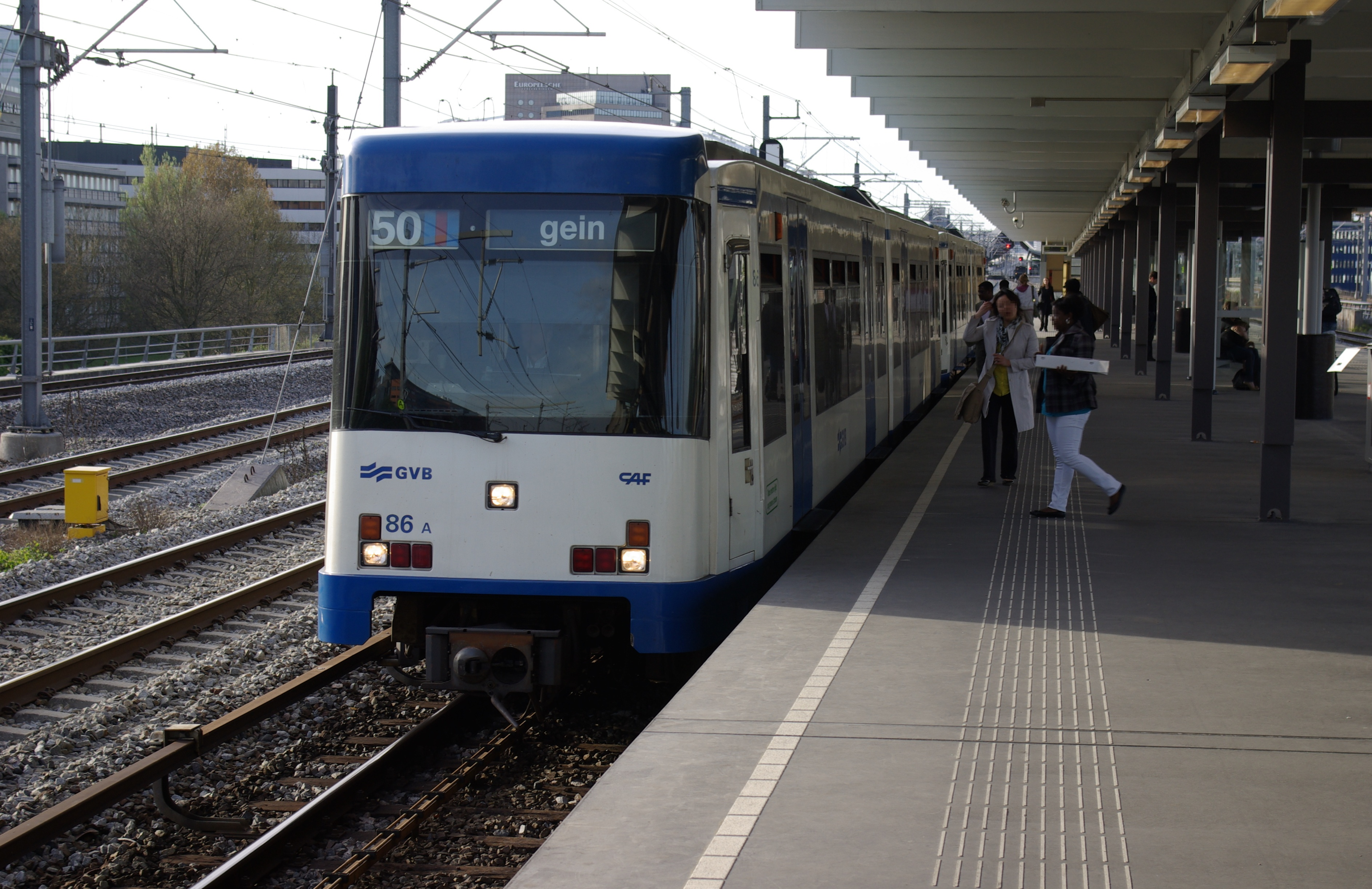
M4-set 86 at Bullewijk station

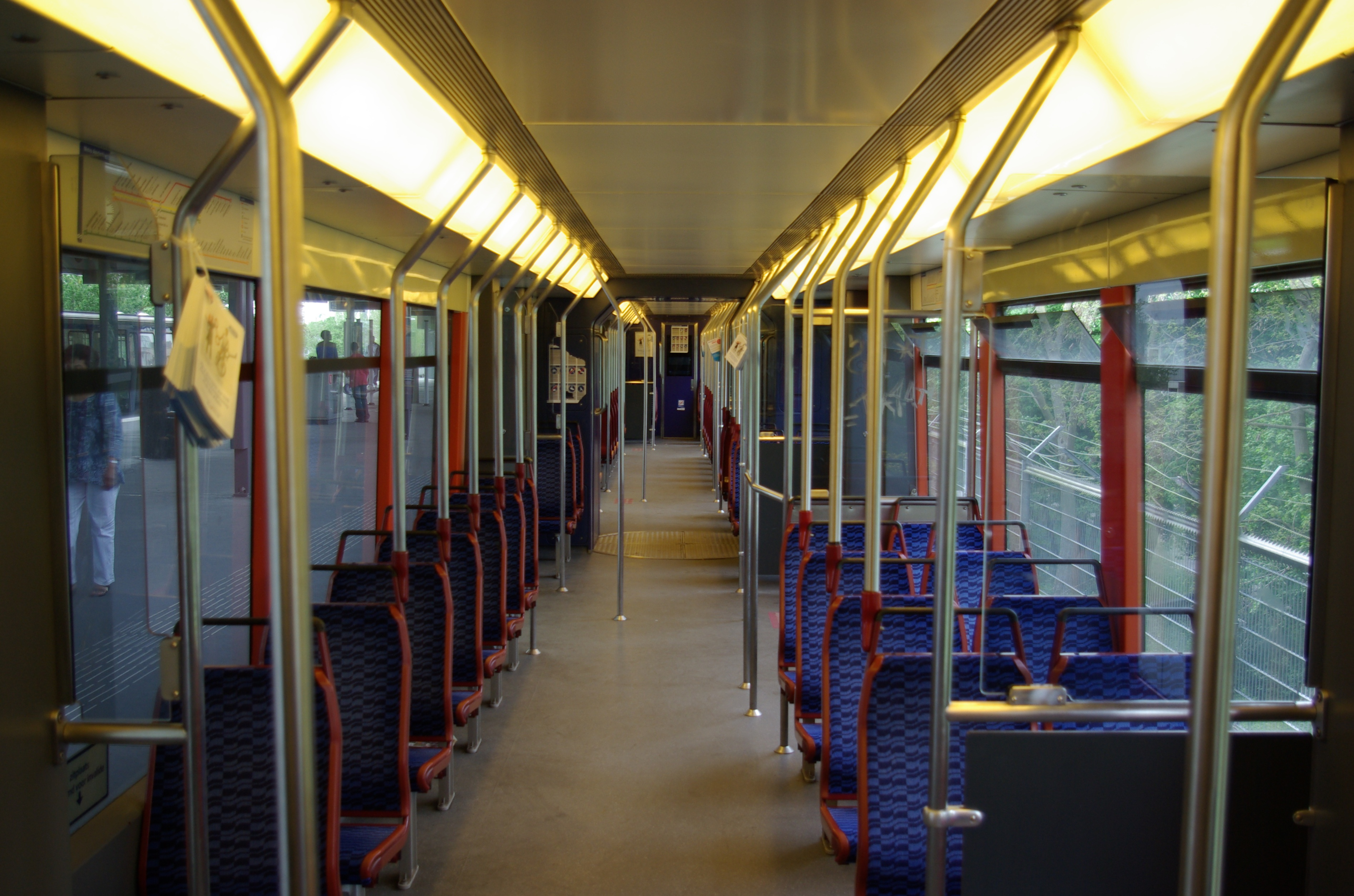
Interior of the M4 train

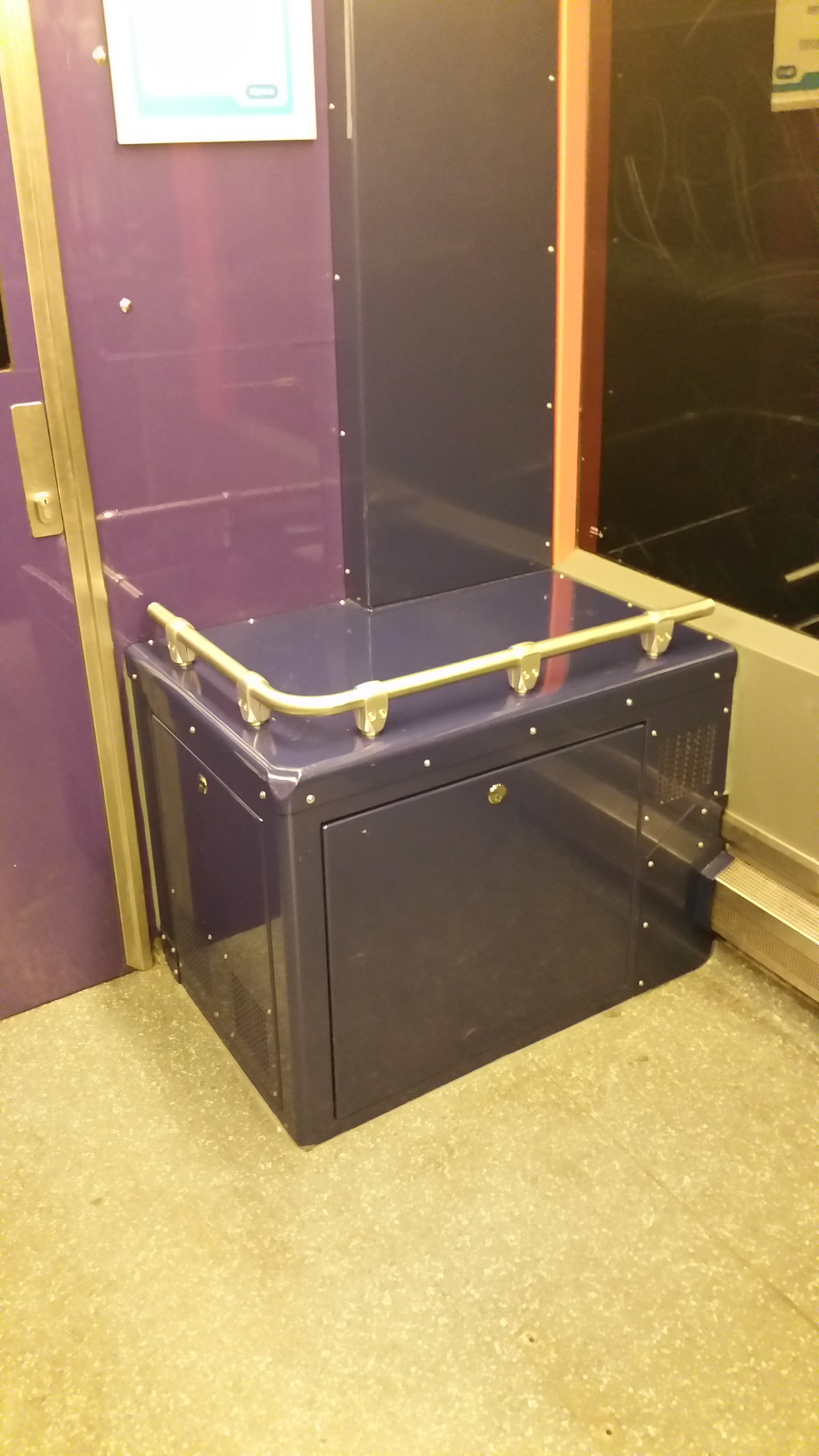
M4-set 76: newly installed cabinet for future semi-automatic operation and new security system
