= Meent tram stop =

Tram stop in Amstelveen, Netherlands

Meent
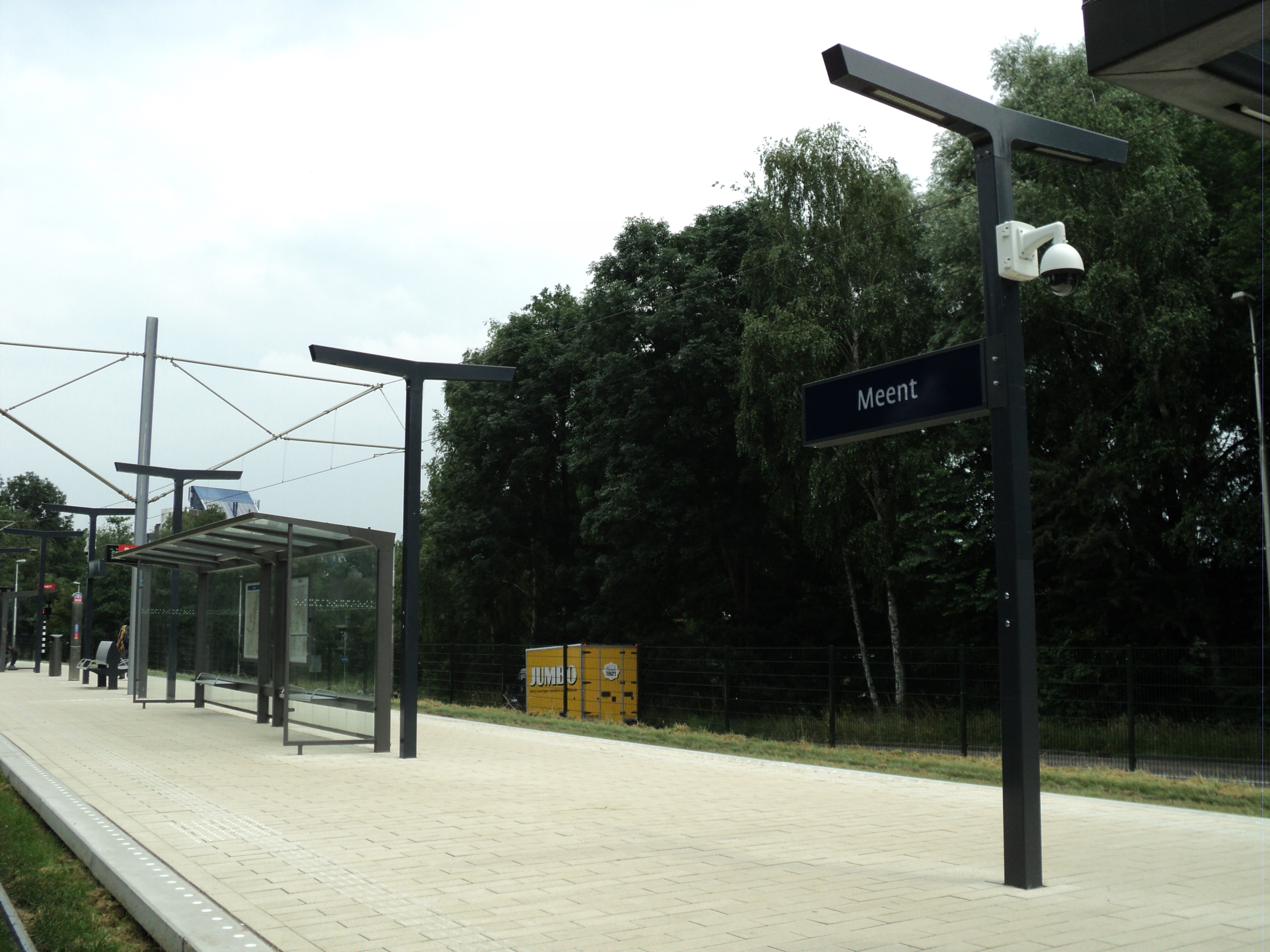
- Tram stop Meent in Amstelveen

General information
- Location: Gondel, Amstelveen; Netherlands
- Coordinates: 52°16′51.8″N 4°51′25.9″E
- Platforms: 1 centre platform
- Tracks: 2

Other information
- Website: GVB: Meent

History
- Opened: 2 Dec 1990 for metro line 51
- Closed: 3 March 2019
- Rebuilt: 13 December 2020 for tram line 25

Services
Preceding station	Amsterdam Tram	Following station
Sportlaan towards Station Zuid	Line 25	Brink towards Uithoorn Centrum

Former services
Preceding station	Amsterdam Metro	Following station
Gondel towards Centraal Station	Line 51	Brink towards Westwijk
Location

Meent is a tram stop within the city of Amstelveen, Netherlands. The stop lies along tram line 25, which was dubbed the Amsteltram before it received its line number. It opened officially on 13 December 2020, unofficially 4 days earlier on 9 December.

Meent was earlier a stop for metro line 51, a hybrid metro/sneltram (light rail) service that opened in 1990. Like a metro, the sneltram used high-level platforms. Metro line 51 service south of Amsterdam Zuid station was closed in 2019 to rebuild stations with lower platforms to accommodate the new low-floor trams for line 25.
