= Ouderkerkerlaan tram stop =

Tram station in Amstelveen, Netherlands

Ouderkerkerlaan

General information
- Location: Beneluxbaan, Amstelveen; Netherlands
- Coordinates: 52°17′46.4″N 4°52′3.2″E
- Platforms: 1 centre platform
- Tracks: 2

Other information
- Website: GVB: Ouderkerkerlaan

History
- Opened: 2 Dec 1990 for metro line 51
- Closed: 3 March 2019
- Rebuilt: 13 December 2020 for tram line 25

Services
Preceding station	Amsterdam Tram	Following station
Oranjebaan towards Station Zuid	Line 25	Sportlaan towards Uithoorn Centrum

Former services
Preceding station	Amsterdam Metro	Following station
Amstelveen Centrum towards Centraal Station	Line 51	Sportlaan towards Westwijk
Location

Ouderkerkerlaan is a tram stop within the city of Amstelveen, Netherlands. The stop lies along tram line 25, which was dubbed the Amsteltram before it received its line number. It opened officially on 13 December 2020, unofficially 4 days earlier on 9 December.

Ouderkerkerlaan was earlier a stop for metro line 51, a hybrid metro/sneltram (light rail) service that opened in 1990. Like a metro, the sneltram used high-level platforms. Metro line 51 service south of Amsterdam Zuid station was closed in 2019 to rebuild stations with lower platforms to accommodate the new low-floor trams for line 25.

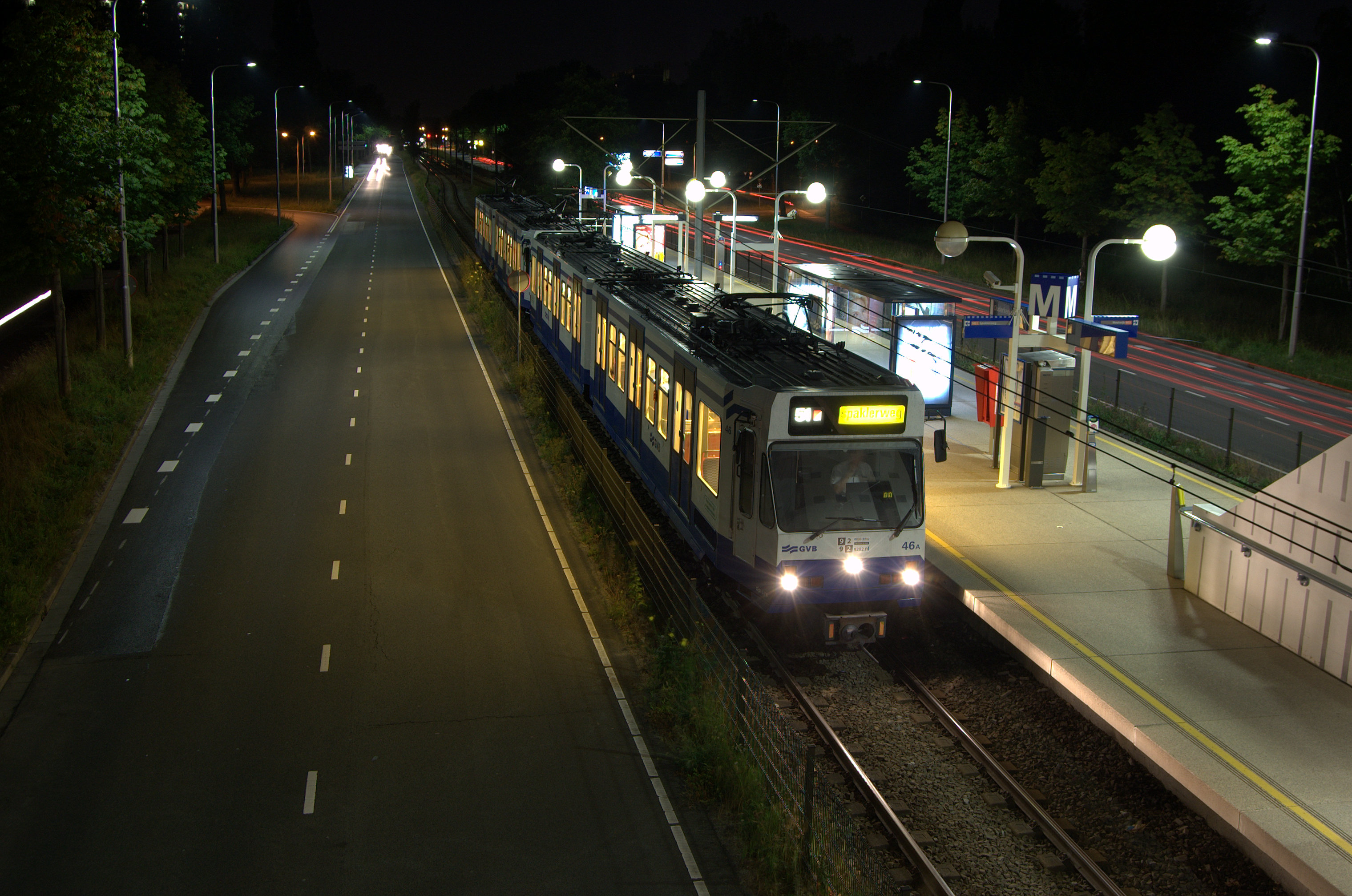
Metro line 51 sneltram (light rail tram) at Ouderkerkerlaan in 2013
