= Marne tram stop =

Tram station in Amstelveen, Netherlands

Marne

General information
- Location: Beneluxbaan, Amstelveen; Netherlands
- Coordinates: 52°17′13.1″N 4°51′40.9″E

History
- Opened: 2 December 1990
- Closed: 3 March 2019

Former services
Preceding station	Amsterdam Metro	Following station
Sportlaan towards Centraal Station	Line 51	Gondel towards Westwijk
Location
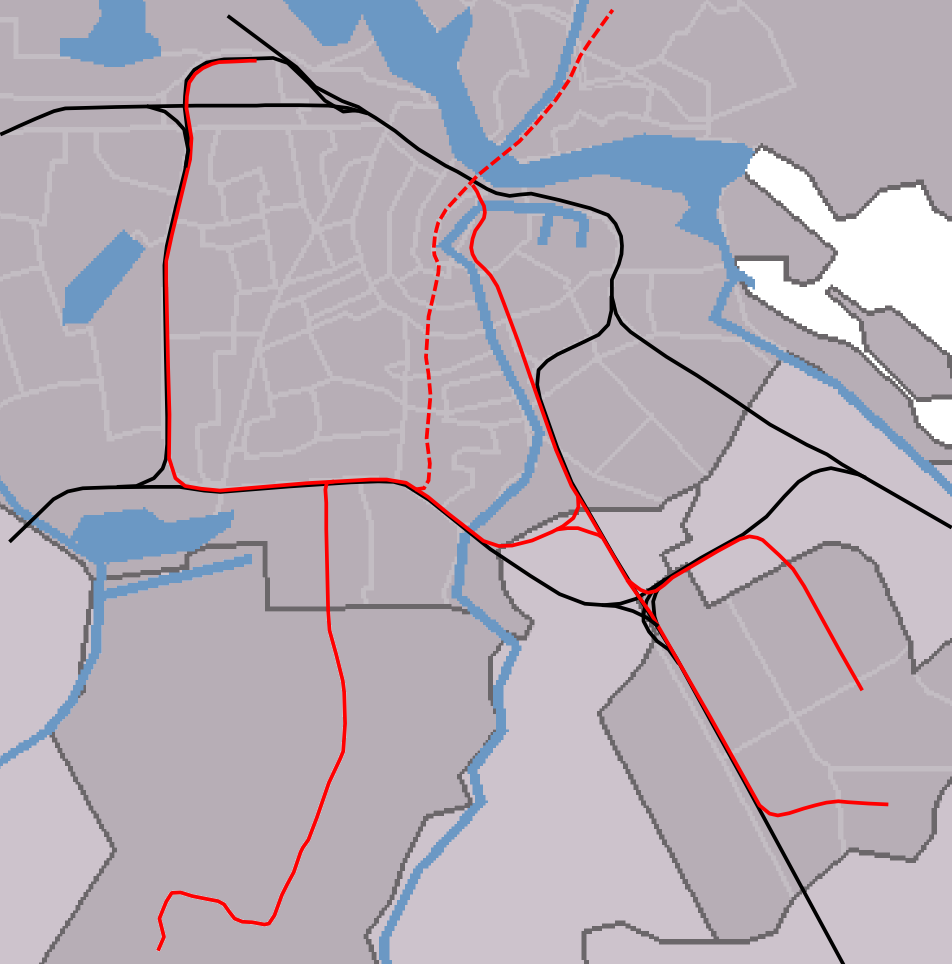
- Location within metro van Amsterdam

Marne was a metro station in Amstelveen on metro line 51, a hybrid metro/sneltram (light rail) route that used high-floor trams. The station closed on 3 March 2019 and was subsequently demolished. After closure, the metro line south of Amsterdam Zuid station, also known as the Amstelveenlijn, was converted for low-floor trams. Today, there is no tram stop at the site. Since its opening in 9 December 2020, the trams of line 25 have been bypassing the site without stopping.

In order to increase reliability and reduce travel time on the rebuilt line, five line 51 stations, including Marne, were demolished instead of being rebuilt as stops for low-floor trams. The former metro station site is 400 metres (1,300 ft) from the Sportlaan tram stop, which was rebuilt for trams below street level.
