= Amstelveen Centrum tram stop =

Former metro station in Amsterdam

Amstelveen Centrum

General information
- Location: Netherlands
- Coordinates: 52°18′0.2″N 4°52′12.1″E

History
- Opened: 2 December 1990
- Closed: 3 March 2019

Former services
Preceding station	Amsterdam Metro	Following station
Oranjebaan towards Centraal Station	Line 51	Ouderkerkerlaan towards Westwijk
Location
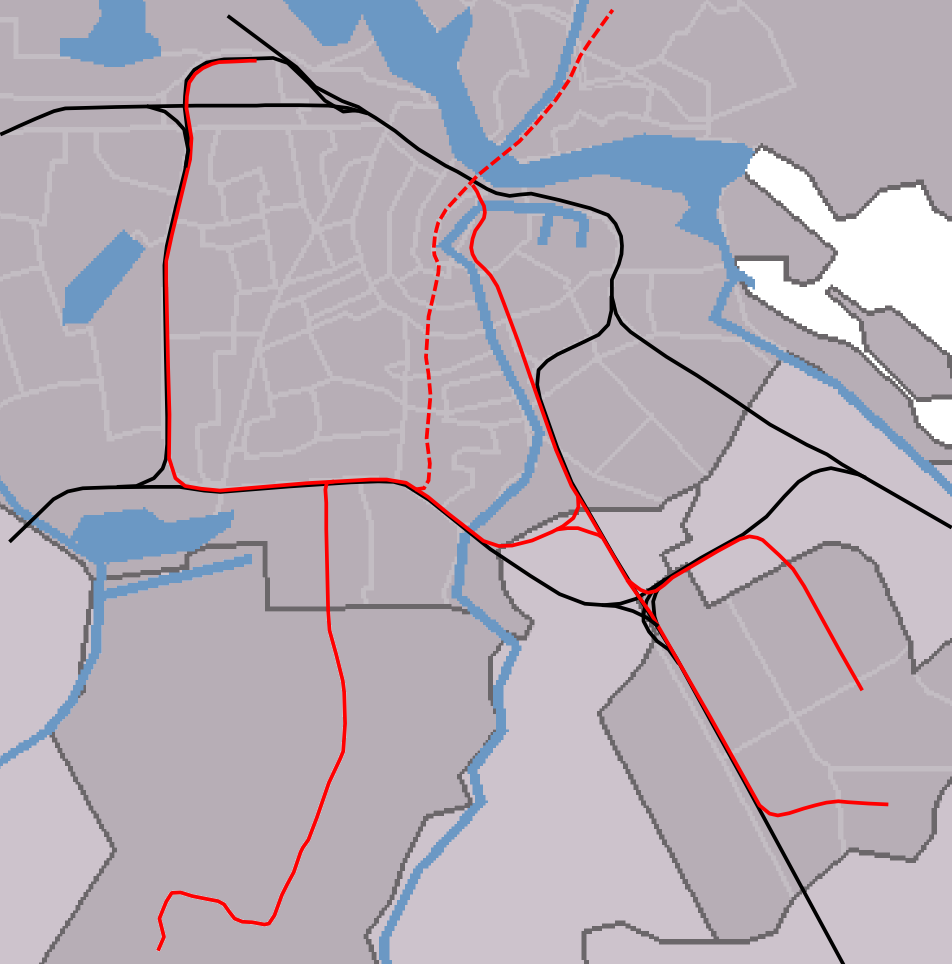
- Location within metro van Amsterdam

Amstelveen Centrum was a metro station in Amstelveen on metro line 51, a hybrid metro/sneltram (light rail) route that used high-floor trams. The station served the Amstelveen Stadshart shopping mall. The station closed on 3 March 2019 and was subsequently demolished. After closure, the metro line south of Amsterdam Zuid station, also known as the Amstelveenlijn, was converted for low-floor trams. Today, there is no tram stop at the site. Since its opening on 9 December 2020, the trams of line 25 have been bypassing the site without stopping; however, line 5 trams continue to serve Stadshart.

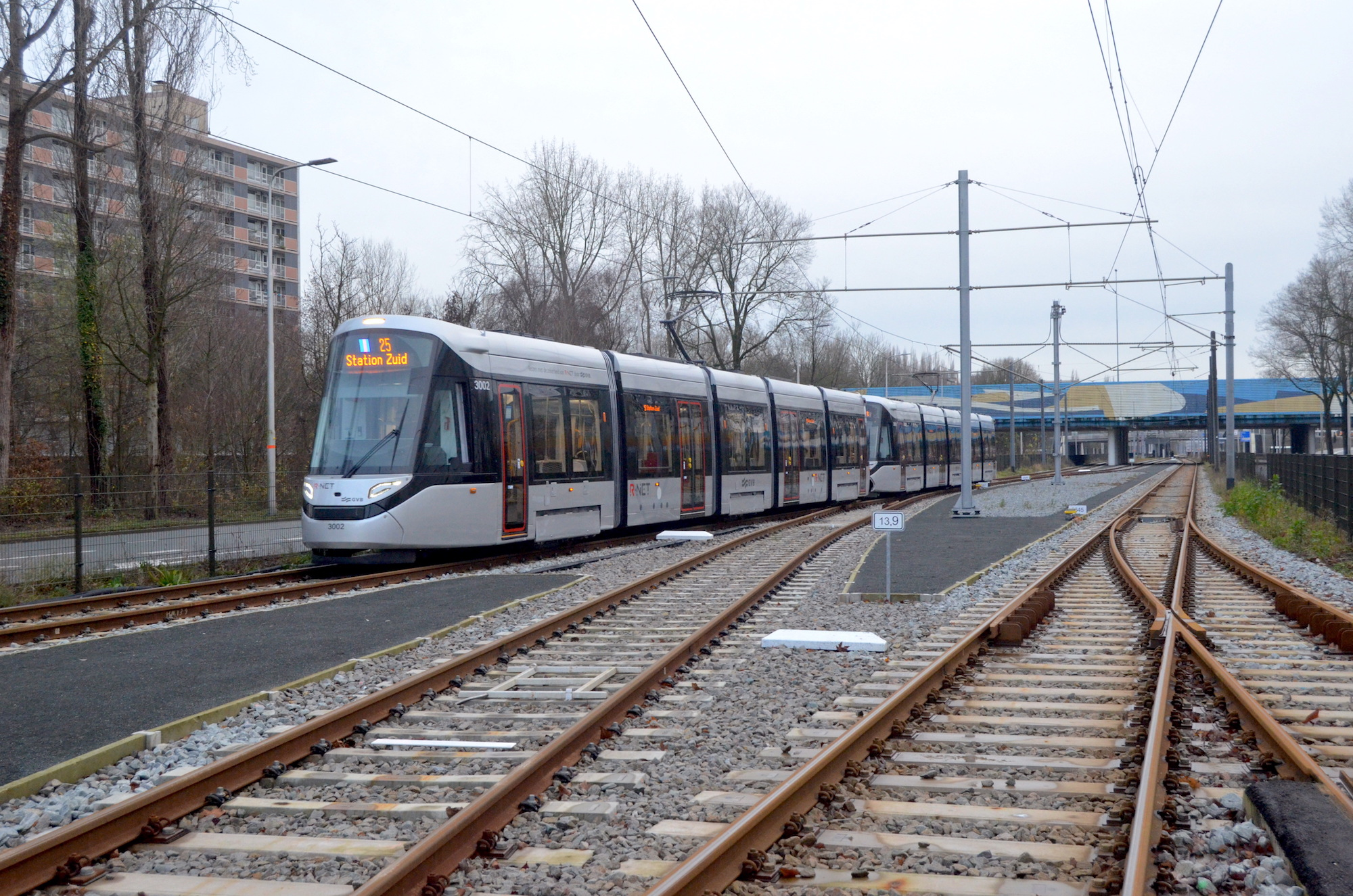
Line 25 trams passing site of former Amstelveen Centrum station with branch to Stadshart

In order to increase reliability and reduce travel time on the rebuilt line, five line 51 stations, including Amstelveen Centrum, were demolished instead of being rebuilt as stops for low-floor trams. The former metro station site is 450 metres (1,480 ft) from the rebuilt Ouderkerkerlaan tram stop, and 350 metres (1,150 ft) from the Oranjebaan tram stop. The former metro station was also 250 metres (820 ft) from the Stadshart stop used by tram line 5 which also runs north to Amsterdam Zuid station.
