= Amstelveenseweg metro station =

Metro station in Amsterdam

Amstelveenseweg
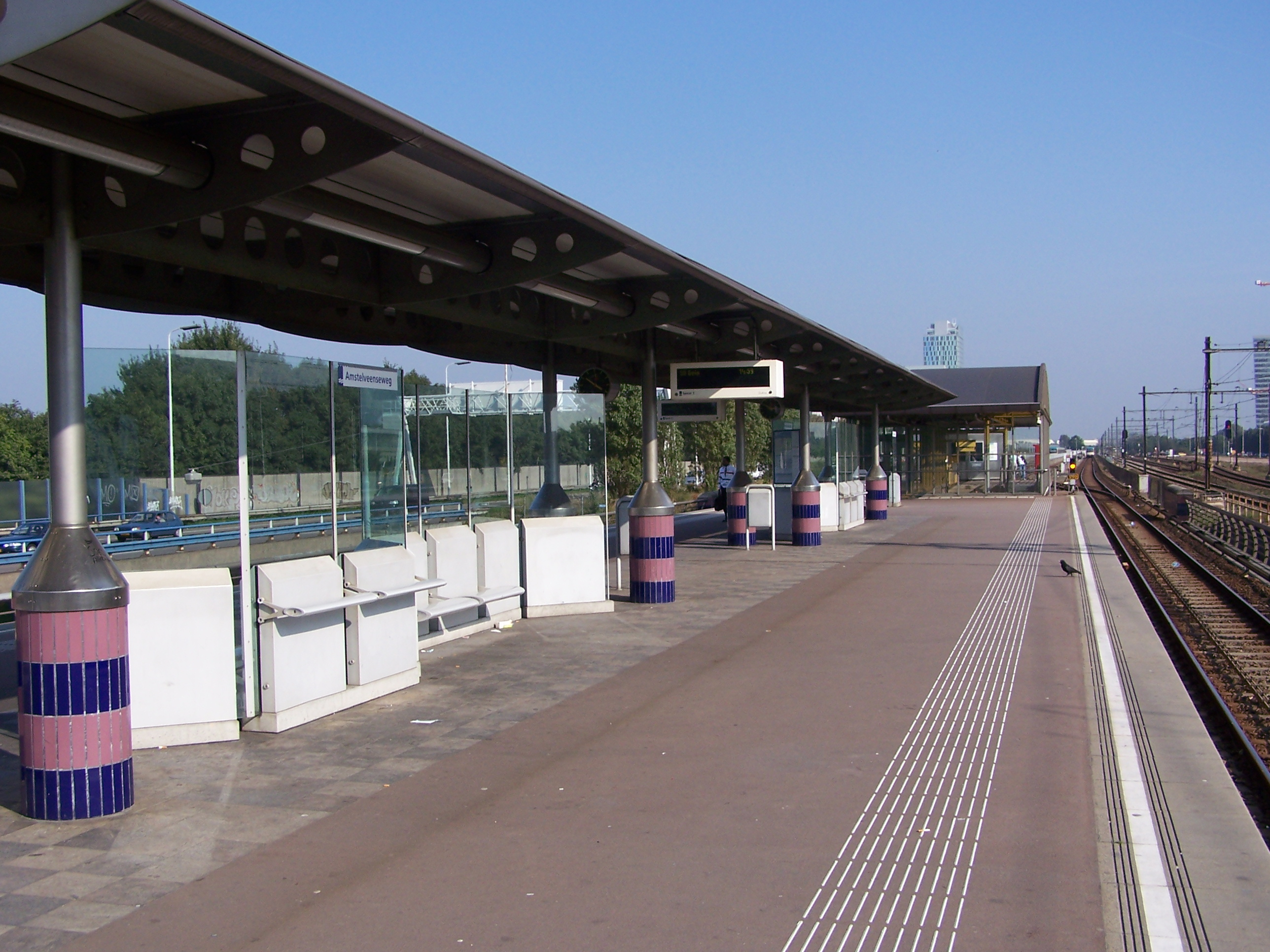

General information
- Location: Amstelveenseweg, Amsterdam; Netherlands
- Coordinates: 52°20′19″N 4°51′29″E
- Owner: Gemeentelijk Vervoerbedrijf
- Platforms: 1 island platform
- Tracks: 2

Other information
- Station code: ASW

History
- Opened: 28 May 1997; 29 years ago

Services
Preceding station	Amsterdam Metro	Following station
Station Zuid towards Gein	Line 50	Henk Sneevlietweg towards Isolatorweg
Station Zuid towards Centraal Station	Line 51	Henk Sneevlietweg towards Isolatorweg
Preceding station	Amsterdam Tram	Following station
IJsbaanpad towards Frederiksplein	Line 24	VU medisch centrum towards De Boelelaan/VU
Location
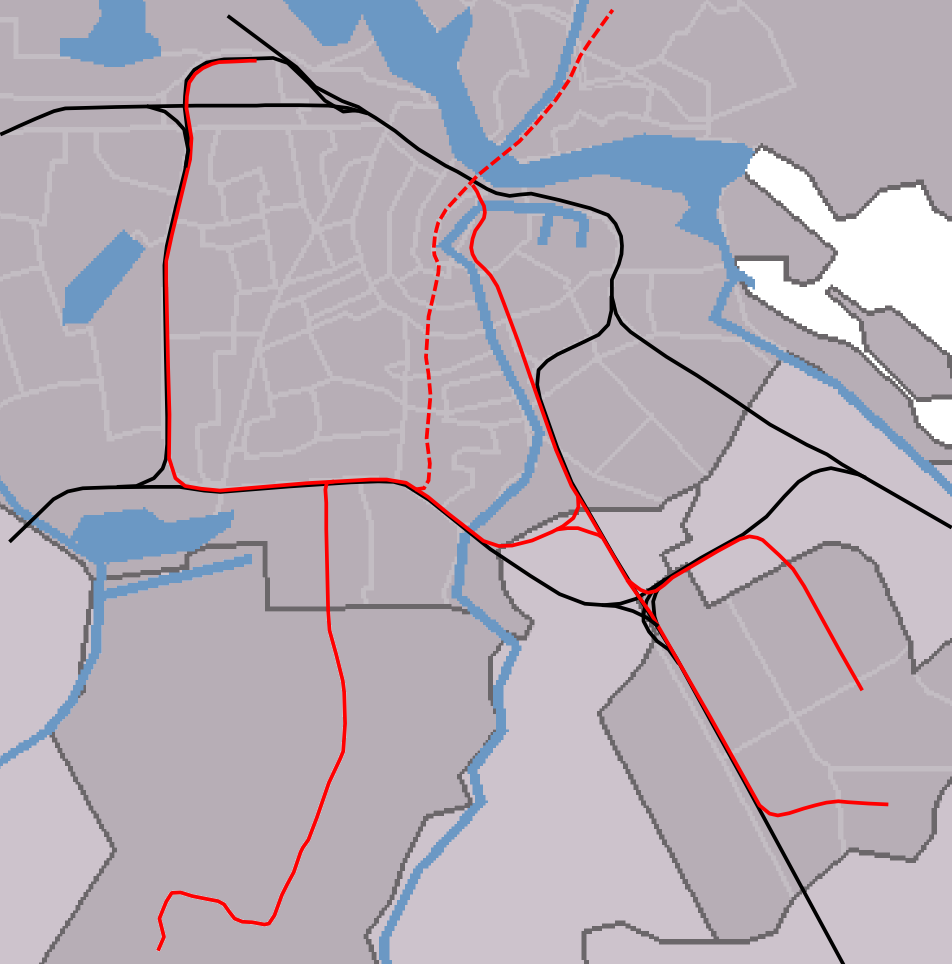
- Location within metro van Amsterdam

Amstelveenseweg is an Amsterdam Metro station in the south of Amsterdam, Netherlands. The station opened in 1997 and is served by line 50 and 51 (Isolatorweg - Gein & Centraal Station - Isolatorweg).

Amstelveenseweg station is an "important" transit point as the metro crosses several bus and tram lines. Changes to the station and its surroundings were made in 2022 to make transiting easier and safer. The station lies in the south of the city and serves as the metro station for many offices, the VU University Medical Center and Olympic Stadium.

The metro station is only accessible with an OV-chipkaart or GVB Travel Pass.

In January 2012, a gas leak at the metro station halted the tram and metro traffic, as well as all trains between Amsterdam Bijlmer station and Schiphol Airport.

== Metro services ==
- 50 Isolatorweg - Sloterdijk - Lelylaan - Zuid - RAI - Duivendrecht - Bijlmer ArenA - Holendrecht - Gein
- 51 Isolatorweg - Sloterdijk - Lelylaan - Zuid - RAI - Amsterdam Amstel - Central Station

== Tram services ==
- 24 Centraal Station - Dam - Weteringcircuit - De Pijp - Oud-Zuid - Olympisch Stadion - VU Medisch Centrum

== Bus services ==
=== City Services ===
This service is operated by GVB.

- 62 Station Lelylaan - Slotervaart - Hoofddorpplein - Haarlemmermeerstation - Olympisch Stadion - VU - Buitenveldert - RAI - Station Amstel

=== Regional Services ===
These services are operated by Connexxion and run under the R-NET brand.

- 341 Amsterdam Zuid - VU - Schiphol Noord - Schiphol Airport - Hoofddorp Station - Hoofddorp Centrum - Hoofddorp Spaarne Gasthuis
- 346 Amsterdam Zuid - VU - Haarlem Station
- 347 Amsterdam Busstation Elandsgracht - Leidseplein - Museumplein - Haarlemmermeerstation - Olympisch Stadion - Amstelveen Busstation - Uithoorn Busstation
- 357 Amsterdam Busstation Elandsgracht - Leidseplein - Museumplein - Haarlemmermeerstation - Olympisch Stadion - Amstelveen Busstation - Aalsmeer Busstation
- 397 Amsterdam Busstation Elandsgracht - Leidseplein - Museumplein - Haarlemmermeerstation - Olympisch Stadion - Schiphol Noord - Schiphol Airport - Hoofddorp Station - Nieuw-Vennep P+R Getsewoud Zuid

Amsterdam Metro network
