= Sportlaan tram stop =

Tram station in Amstelveen, Netherlands

Sportlaan
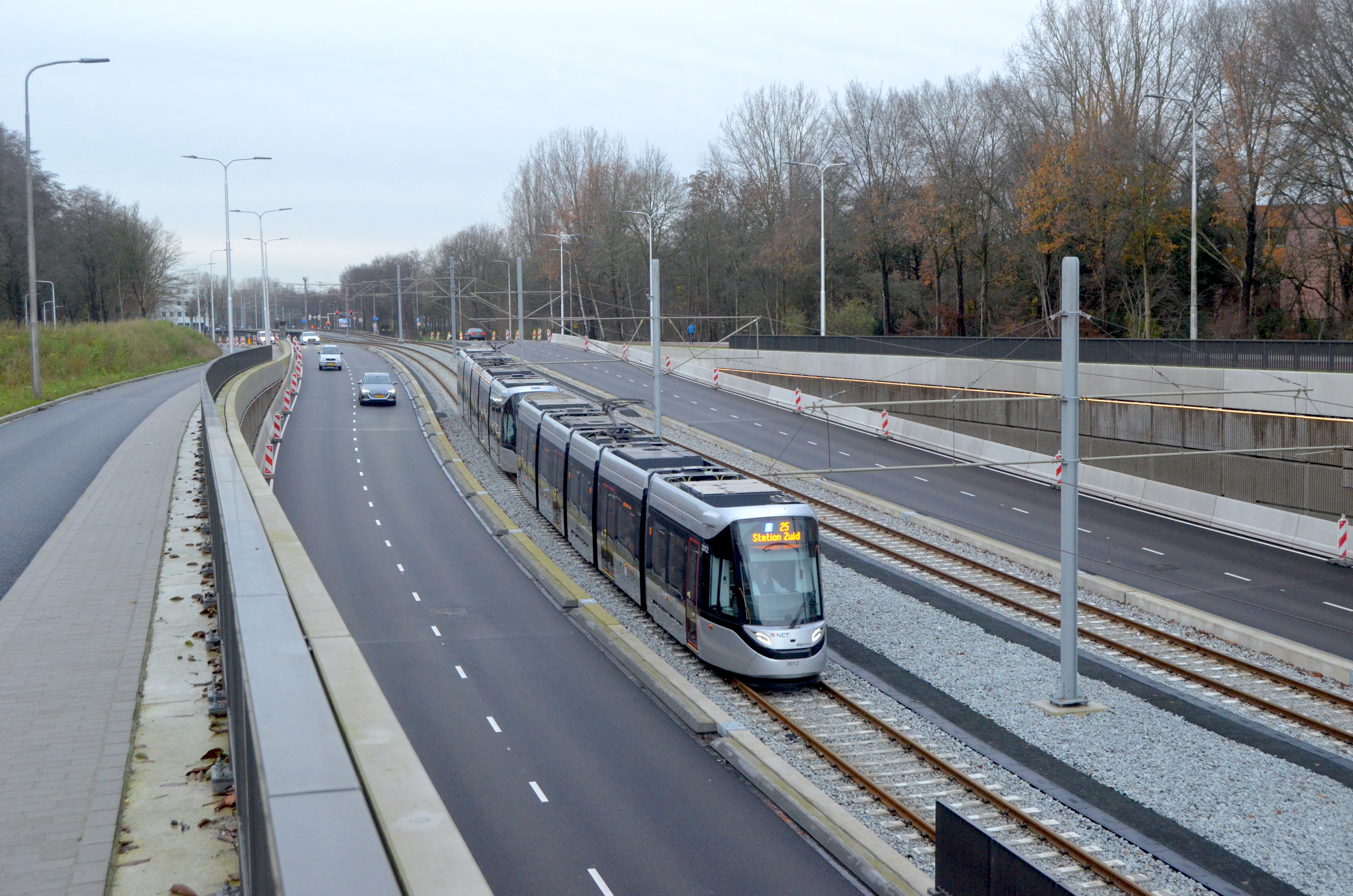
- Line 25 tram approaching Sportlaan

General information
- Location: Beneluxbaan & Sportlaan, Amstelveen; Netherlands
- Coordinates: 52°17′25.7″N 4°51′49.9″E
- Platforms: 1 centre platform
- Tracks: 2

Other information
- Website: GVB: Sportlaan

History
- Opened: 2 Dec 1990 for metro line 51
- Closed: 3 March 2019
- Rebuilt: 13 December 2020 for tram line 25

Services
Preceding station	Amsterdam Tram	Following station
Ouderkerkerlaan towards Station Zuid	Line 25	Meent towards Uithoorn Centrum

Former services
Preceding station	Amsterdam Metro	Following station
Ouderkerkerlaan towards Centraal Station	Line 51	Marne towards Westwijk
Location

Sportlaan is a tram stop within the city of Amstelveen, Netherlands. The stop lies along tram line 25, which was dubbed the Amsteltram before it received its line number. It opened officially on 13 December 2020, unofficially 4 days earlier on 9 December.

The stop is located in an open trench below street level, and resembles a station having a centre platform with stairs and a glass-walled elevator leading up to street level. Bridges above the stop carry automobile traffic over the tram line via a roundabout. This stop is similar in design to those at the Kronenburg and Zonnestein tram stops. On 7 August 2019, the roundabout above the Sportlaan stop was opened for road traffic.

Sportlaan was earlier a stop for metro line 51, a hybrid metro/sneltram (light rail) service that opened in 1990. Like a metro, the sneltram used high-level platforms. Metro line 51 service south of Amsterdam Zuid station was closed in 2019 to rebuild stations with lower platforms to accommodate the new low-floor trams for line 25. Unlike the current line 25 stop, the old metro line 51 stop was located at street level and tracks used to cross the street Sportlaan at grade.

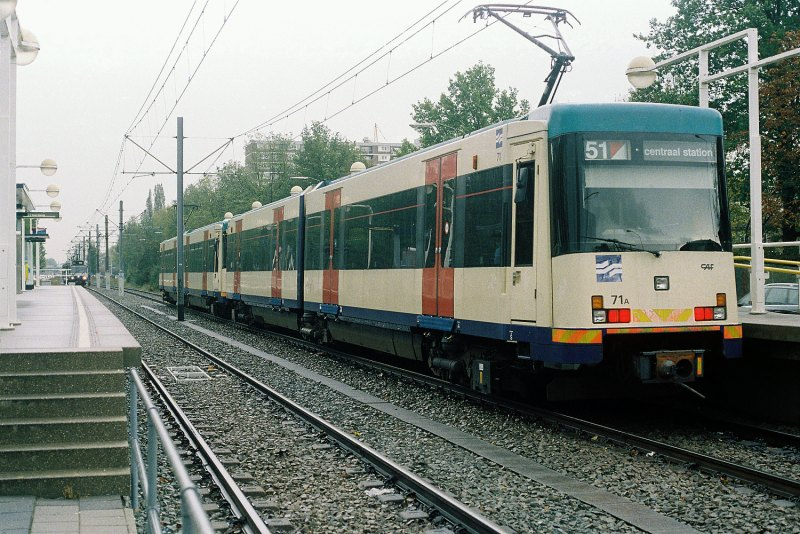
Metro line 51 sneltram at now replaced Sportlaan stop in 2013
