= Line 51 (Amsterdam Metro) =

Metro line in Amsterdam

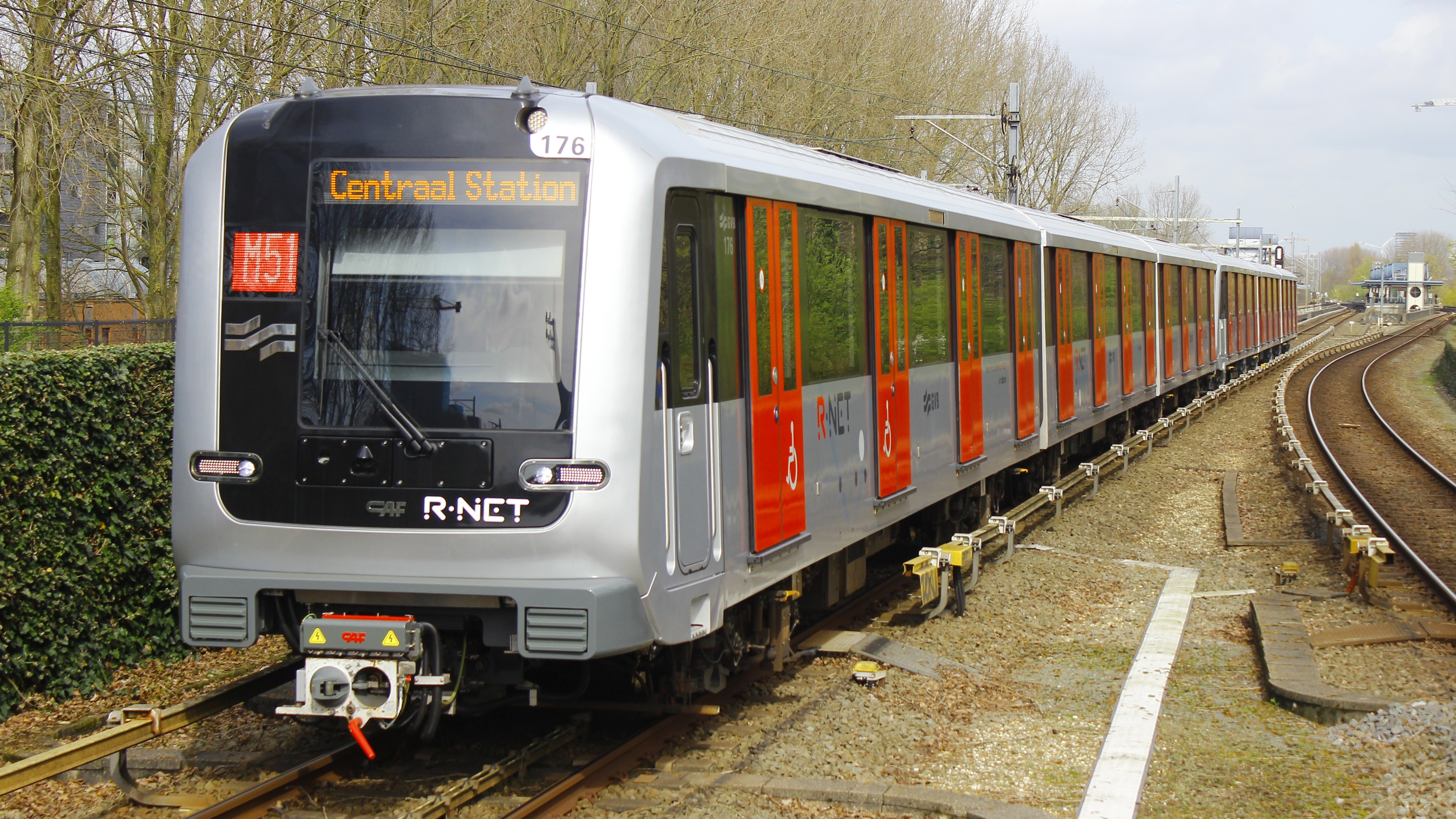
- A coupled M7 series train at Heemstedestraat

Overview
- Native name: Ringlijn
- Owner: Amsterdam Metro
- Termini: Amsterdam Centraal; Isolatorweg
- Stations: 19
- Color on map: Orange

Service
- Type: Rapid transit
- Operator: GVB
- Rolling stock: S3/M4; M5; M7

History
- Opened: 1 December 1990; 35 years ago

Technical
- Line length: 18.7 km (11.6 mi)
- Number of tracks: Double-track
- Track gauge: 1,435 mm (4 ft 8 1/2 in) standard gauge
- Electrification: Third rail, 750 V DC
- Operating speed: 70 km/h (43 mph)
Route map

Metro Line 51 (Dutch: Metrolijn 51), also known as the Ring Line (Ringlijn), is an Amsterdam Metro line running from Amsterdam Centraal station to Isolatorweg metro station, almost creating a full circle through Amsterdam. It was opened in December 1990 as a metro/tram hybrid line named sneltram ('express tram') and served the suburb of Amstelveen. Using special rolling stock, the Amstelveen Line ran as a metro on 750 V DC third rail from Amsterdam Centraal to the Amsterdam Zuid station, where it would switch operation modes and utilize 600 V DC overhead lines and end at Poortwachter. An extension to Westwijk was completed in 2004. In Amstelveen, the line partially ran on the same track as tram line 5 and had many level crossings.

The express tram was the result of a compromise between the municipalities of Amsterdam and Amstelveen. A full metro line for the suburb was proposed in the original 1968 plan of the system along with three other lines throughout the city, but the majority of these lines were cancelled due to protests against the demolition of houses caused by the metro construction in the city centre of Amsterdam. Amstelveen still wished to continue with the plans for a metro as it would not require any demolition, but the topic was too controversial in Amsterdam. The Amstelveen Line had problems following its opening as it suffered from a lack of capacity due to the lack of trains. It was temporarily shortened from Centraal to Zuid for 7 months in February 1991. Many collisions occurred at the level crossings, leading to additional safety measures.

Studies in the 2000s showed that Line 51 was unreliable due to the switching of operation modes, its level crossings and because it ran alongside a regular tram line. It was proposed to upgrade the section in Amstelveen to a full metro line as part of the new North–South Line, but this was deemed to be too expensive and was made impossible due to the developments at Zuid. In 2015, it was decided to convert the line into a high-quality and low-floor tram. Line 51 got its current route on the Ring Line as a full metro in March 2019 and was replaced by tram line 25 in Amstelveen.

== Initial plan ==
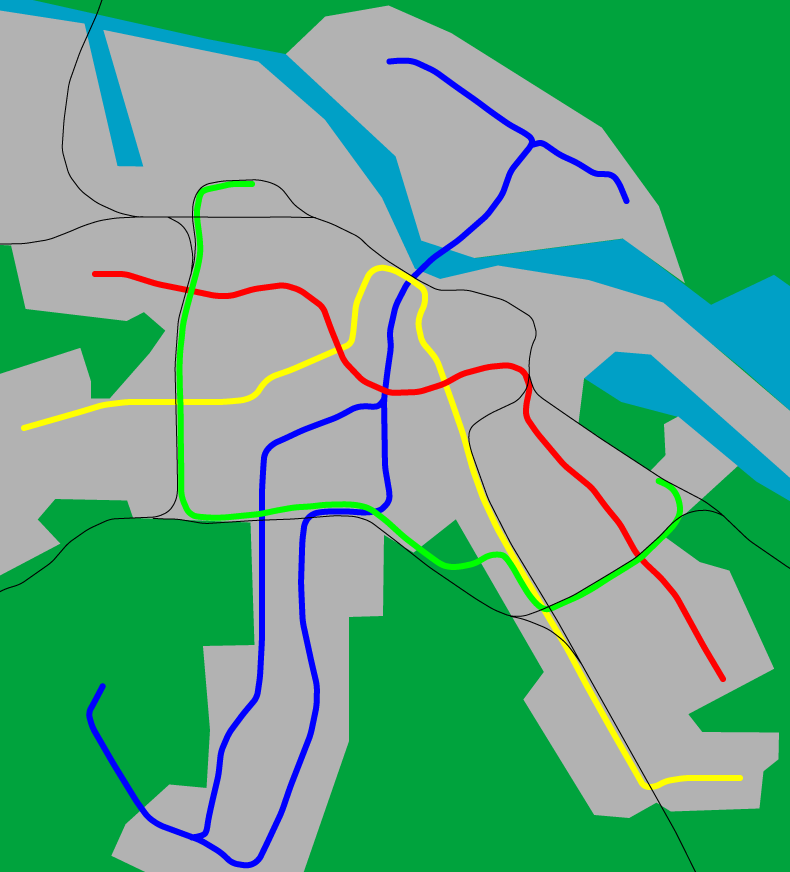
The original plan, in dark blue, with two branches through Amstelveen, at the lower part of the image.

The Bureau Stadsspoor (City Rail Bureau) was formed in 1963 and concluded that Amsterdam needed a new rail system to move large numbers of people. The bureau released five reports by 1966 and laid out a final plan for a total of four metro lines in the city, which was presented to the public in the same year during a press conference by alderman Roel de Wit. The plan included a North–South line originating in Amsterdam-Noord, which would split into two branches in the suburb of Amstelveen and end in Schiphol-East. In May 1968, the municipal council of Amsterdam approved the plans based on the advice of the bureau and reserved the money required for the first phase of the project, the two East–West lines. Construction of the first lines commenced in August 1970 at Weesperplein.

The metro was a controversial topic as the houses above the underground sections of lines in the city centre of Amsterdam had to be demolished to make construction possible. This caused protests against the metro at Nieuwmarkt in 1975, which eventually led to the cancellation of all other lines in the plan, while the two East–West lines already under construction were scaled back to just the eastern part of the city and renamed as the East Line. The reputation of the word "Metro" in Amsterdam was damaged for a long time due to the entire incident.

== History ==
=== Planning and construction ===
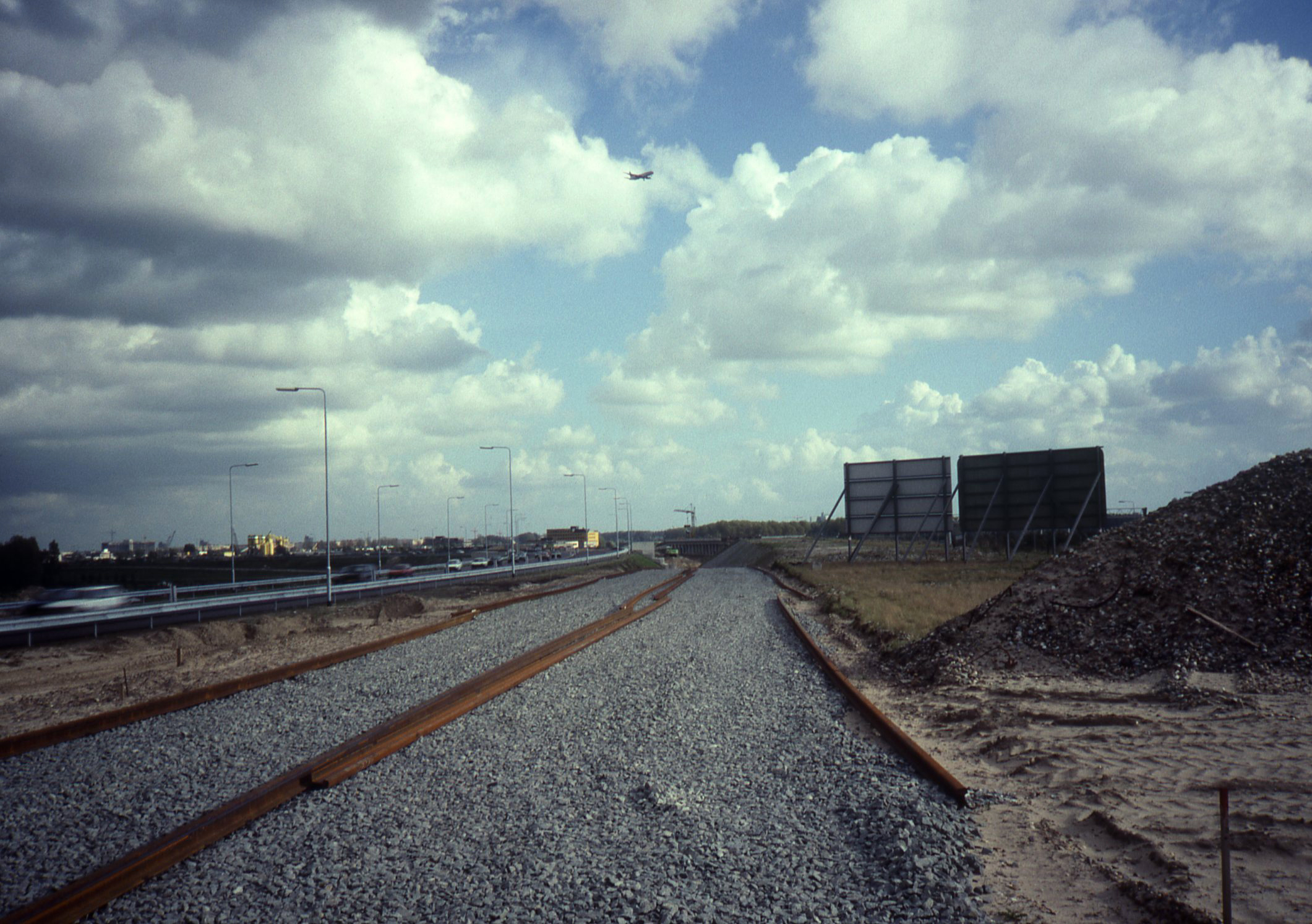
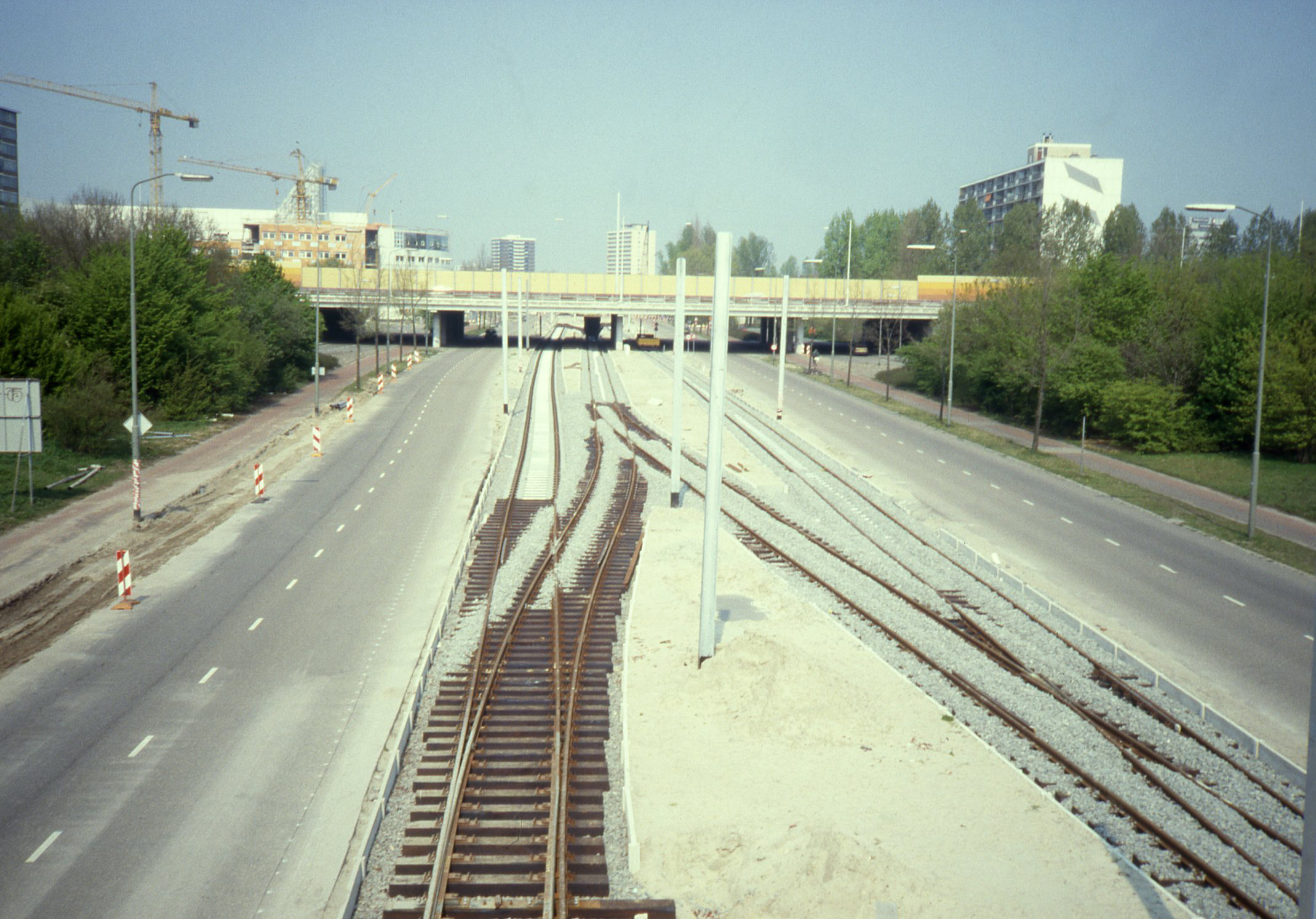
Construction of the line near the A10 motorway (top) and in Amstelveen (bottom).

The area where the lines were supposed to be installed was undeveloped despite the cancellation in 1975. In 1978, the municipality of Amstelveen announced that it would not take a metro line into account anymore, but that it was positive about a sneltram ('high-speed tram' or 'express tram'). This was the result of a compromise between the municipalities of Amstelveen and Amsterdam; Amstelveen initially wanted a full metro, while this was still politically controversial in Amsterdam. In the summer of 1979, both municipalities announced their support for an express tram line from Amsterdam Zuid station to Amstelveen with 13 stations. In September, the municipality of Amstelveen unexpectedly voted against the line, leading to more discussions. Amstelveen opposed because they claimed the tram line would not be faster or an improvement over the buses already running, and asked for more frequent buses instead. In November, the Ministry of Transport and Water Management announced that it would only support the express tram if it was extended to Amsterdam Centraal station instead of ending at Zuid, resulting in less transfers.

In February 1985, the two municipalities agreed on building the express tram; funding from the Dutch Government was secured shortly after. The GVB would financially compensate Centraal Nederland, which ran a bus route from Centraal station to Amstelveen. Centraal Nederland still started a campaign to construct a dedicated bus lane instead, which they claimed would be cheaper than the tram. Despite this, the municipality of Amstelveen voted in favour of the express tram over the bus lane in August 1985. The line was expected to cost 130 million Dutch guilder, with the government paying 54 million guilder and the municipality of Amsterdam funding the rest. The line was named Amstelveenlijn ('Amstelveen Line') and was expected to be the first of multiple express tram lines around Amsterdam. Construction on the line started in August 1987 and was met with protests by houseboat residents at Duivendrechtsevaart, who had to move out. Landscaping of the areas with dirt were complete by May 1988.

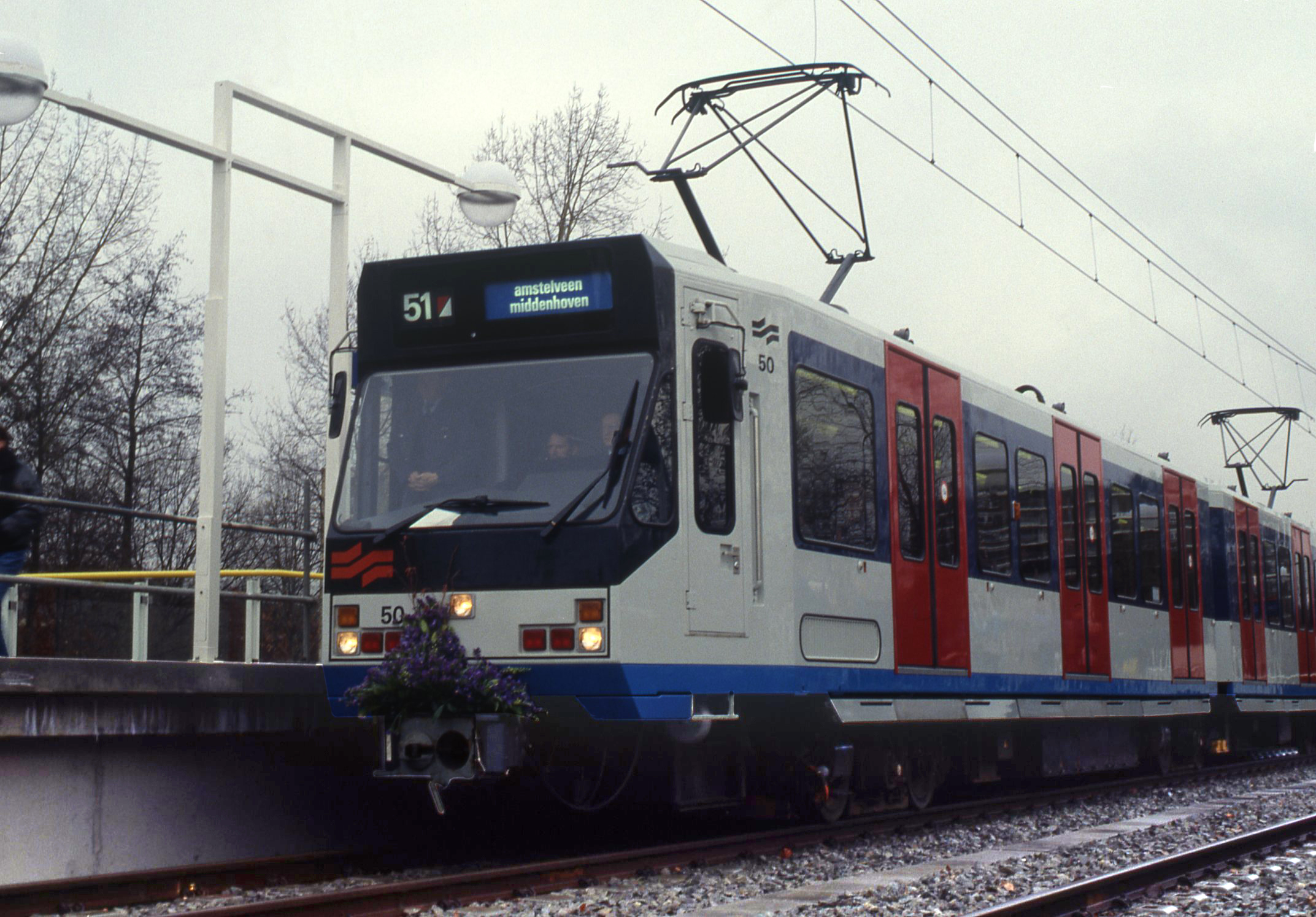
An express tram on the first day of operations in its original livery

The GVB started to test the new tram units in May 1990 on the line. A few weeks before the scheduled opening, two trains collided during a test run and were damaged, resulting in a reduced frequency at opening. The line officially opened on 30 November 1990. Metro and express tram lines were numbered in the 50s, with the Amstelveen Line receiving number 51. The line ran as a metro using the existing track of the East Line from Amsterdam Centraal to Amsterdam Zuid on 750 V DC third rail. After Zuid, the trains would extend their pantographs and pick up current from 600 V DC overhead lines to serve Amstelveen as a tram. The line used a tunnel beneath Amsterdam Zuid to join the Parnassusweg street. The second part of the route also shared tracks with tram line 5 and was constructed on the median strip of a road. This led to the line having 15 level crossings in the suburbs where the right of way was regulated by traffic lights, which is unusual for a metro line. Despite its metro/tram hybrid usage, the line was not called a metro due to the controversy surrounding the term. The platforms constructed in Amstelveen had a length of 65 metres (213 ft) and were compatible for high-floor units. On stations where the express tram ran alongside regular trams, an additional platform for low-floor trams was built. Upon its opening, the line terminated at Poortwachter. There were plans to expand it to Westwijk by 1993 and later to Schiphol Airport or Uithoorn. The destination board on the trains already had the option of displaying "Westwijk" and "Schiphol-Oost" before the line opened.

=== Operation as a hybrid ===
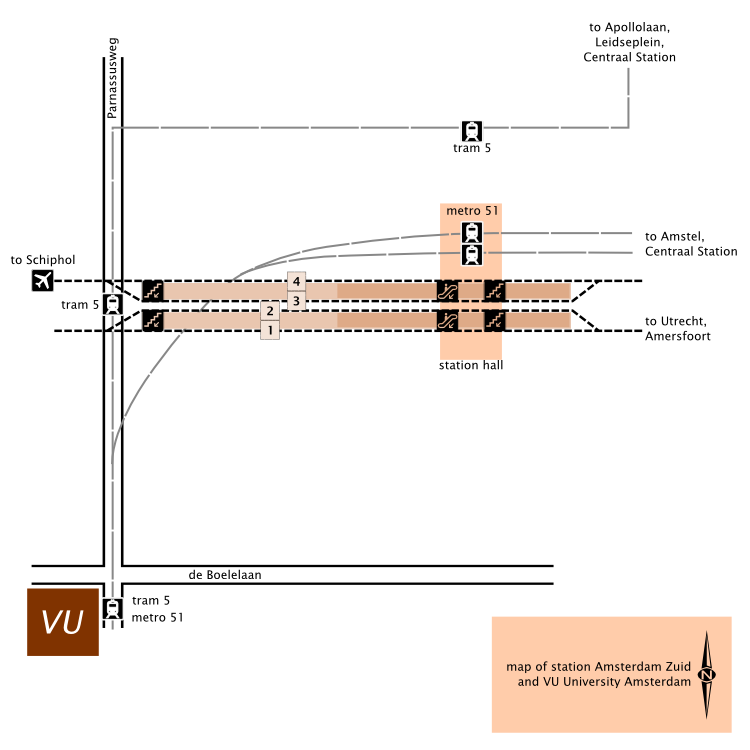
A map of Amsterdam Zuid station in 2008 where Line 51 changed to overhead lines and joined tram line 5 via a tunnel under mainline rail

The GVB started to have problems with the line as soon as it opened. Within a week of the opening, five of the 13 units were out of order due to technical problems or repairs. The capacity of the remaining trains was not enough and some people were left behind on the platform during rush hours due to the vehicles being full. The route of the line was shorted from Centraal to Zuid in February 1991 as 11 of the units were not running due to technical problems caused by the winter. The line resumed service on its normal route seven months later in September, with the tickets for the line initially being free as these were considered to be test runs. The tests ended and passengers were required to pay again by early November. Following the resumption of service, regular buses still ran just behind the express trams in case a problem occurred, as the rolling stock was sensitive to problems when switching operation modes, electronics froze during cold days and some communication cables were chewed by rabbits. The problems also put a financial strain on the GVB, as the line had an operating deficit of 17 million Dutch guilder instead of the budgeted 2 million in the first year. Despite the issues, the municipality considered the line to be "sufficient" and started discussions to build a new express tram line from Isolatorweg to Gein.

Residents of Buitenveldert started a campaign in October 1995 to increase the safety of the level crossings of the express tram after three people were killed in separate accidents within a month and many other heavy accidents occurred. They found the precautions taken at crossings, consisting of just a flashing light, to be insufficient despite the trams passing at high speed through traffic and threatened to block the crossings with cars. The trams can go through crossings at a high speed as the traffic light immediately turns white—meaning proceed for public transit—when a tram is approaching, quickly leading to collisions when pedestrians, bikers or cars fail to stop at their red light. The GVB announced the next day that it would install fences and warning signs at some crossings. Following an investigation a week later, maximum speed on some crossings was limited to 40 km/h (25 mph) for the trams.

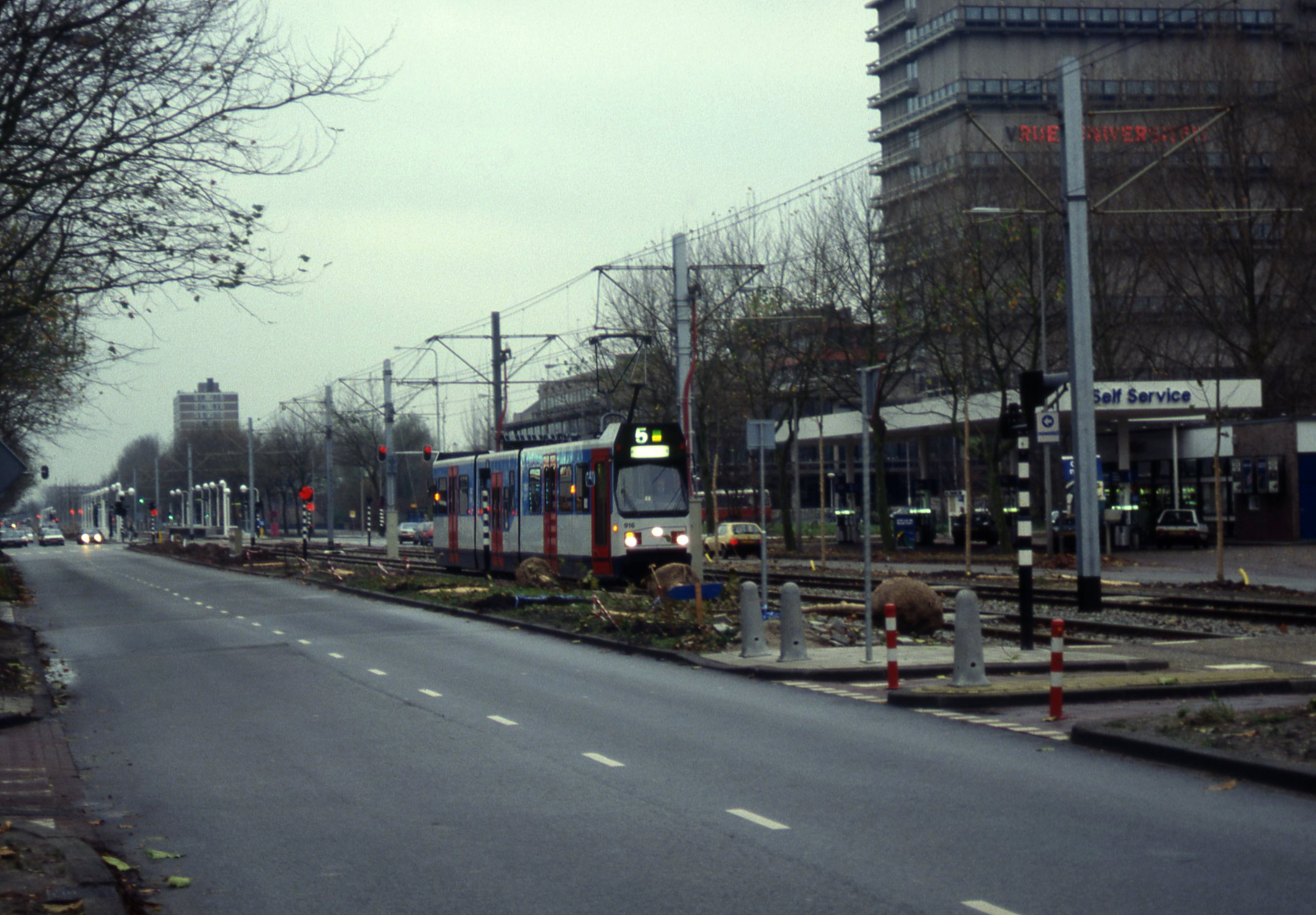
The tracks near De Boelelaan/VU in 1990, with nothing separating trams and other traffic

The line averaged 17 accidents per year by 1996, leading to seven fatalities in total. According to the GVB, none of these were the fault of tram drivers. With the new safety measures in place at crossings, the number of accidents decreased to ten in 1997. In April 1998, fences were installed along the entire line to prevent people from walking on the tracks outside of crossings. The first accident of that year occurred in September, where a man who jumped on the tracks was fatally struck while trying to catch another tram, with the chairman of the legislative council of Buitenveldert saying: "We have now installed bell signals, fences, lights, and safety barriers. People still walk under the tram in their right mind. What other measures can we take?" The council proposed to partially move the tram underground, pending funding from the Ministry of Transport and Water Management, although the ministry had no plans of doing so.

An express tram caught fire at the Weesperplein station on 12 July 1999 due to a blocked disc brake. Although the tram was carrying no passengers at the time, the smoke coming from the fire caused all levels of the station to be evacuated. Two people were taken to hospital for smoke inhalation, but were discharged quickly after their injuries were determined to be minor. GVB installed barriers at four more level crossings on the line in 2003 after a high number of collisions. Around ten people died in collisions involving the express tram during its entire operation span. The extension of the line to Westwijk was completed in September 2004.

=== Discussions on conversion ===
Line 51 on the system map in 2018

According to a 2007 study by the municipality, the line regularly had reliability problems. These were mostly caused by the switching of operation modes, level crossings and because the line was partially running on the same track as a regular tram line. Since the express tram shared some of its route with regular metro lines, a disruption in Line 51 would cause a disruption in the other lines as well. The same study found that it was "essential" to upgrade the Amstelveen Line to modernise the metro system of Amsterdam. This would also impact the North–South Line (Line 52), already under construction at the time, which was set to terminate at Amsterdam Zuid, as the number of metro platforms at the station would limit the frequency of the line. The study proposed to shorten Line 51 by one stop, extend the North–South Line to Westwijk also as a metro/tram hybrid or to extend Line 52 to Amstelveen Stadshart (terminus of tram line 5) as a full metro and have Line 51 operate to Westwijk from there. An action plan to convert the line was completed in 2009 and was pending approval from the involved municipalities. The conversion was expected to cost 400 to 500 million euros and be completed by 2018.

A project office was founded in February 2010 to prepare and enable decision-making of the conversion of the line in 2012. A city development study in 2011, approved by the municipal council, also recommended to upgrade the line to a full metro as a part of the North–South Line. In early 2011, the first report on the possible conversion concluded that it would not be possible to complete and open the new Amstelveen Line in time for the North–South Line. In May, the committee started considering alternative options to a full conversion. The project office was dissolved in September 2011 by alderman Eric Wiebes. Wiebes had imposed a cost–benefit analysis which found that the upgrade to a full metro would be too expensive and unaffordable, while the office kept pushing for the conversion.

On 9 February 2012, the province of North Holland and the municipality of Amsterdam agreed to relocate approximately 1 kilometre (0.62 mi) of the A10 motorway underground in a tunnel. The metro platforms at Amsterdam Zuid would be moved further west, resulting in the tunnel used by Line 51 becoming useless and making the extension of the North–South Line to Amstelveen impossible. On the same day, the municipalities of Amsterdam and Amstelveen announced their support for the conversion of the line into a high-quality tram costing around 300 million euros. In March 2013, the Amsterdam regional transport authority (VRA) definitively determined the preferred option for Amstelveen, where a tram line from Amsterdam Zuid to Westwijk would replace Line 51 and tram line 5 would keep running. The transport authority made the decision to continue with this option in December 2015 after the two municipalities voted in favour of it in November. In December 2016, it was announced that the new tram line would be extended to Uithoorn. The contract to carry out the conversion, which was expected to start in early 2019, was given to VITAL in 2017.

=== Route change ===
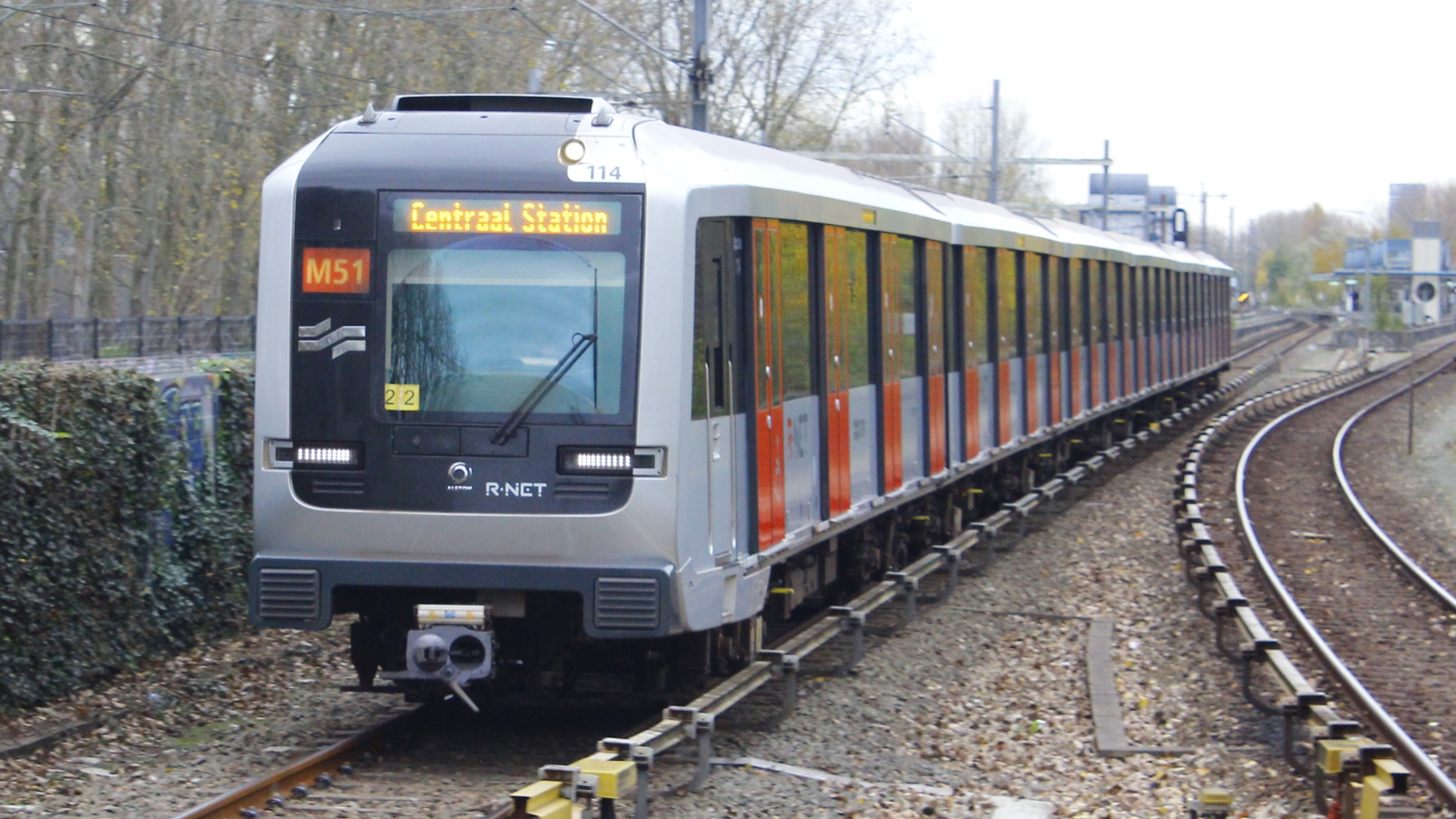
An M5 unit on Line 51 at Heemstedestraat in 2022

The Amstelveen Line closed on 2 March 2019. Metro 51 kept its original route from Amsterdam Centraal to Zuid, and instead of branching off to Amstelveen, it continues west-bound and ends at Isolatorweg. Following this change, the line partially runs on the Ringlijn ('Ring Line'), which is also the nickname given to the line along with Line 50. Following the closure, high-level platforms in Amstelveen were removed to make way for low-floor platforms, four stations were closed and some level crossings were grade separated. The replacement of the Amstelveen Line, tram line 25, was opened on 13 December 2020. On 30 March 2020, the GVB temporarily suspended the metro 51 as a result of the COVID-19 pandemic in the Netherlands impacting the number of passengers; service was resumed on 29 April. The frequency of the line was halved in early 2022 due to lack of staff. Line 51 was chosen as it ran alongside other lines on its entire route.

In February 2025, the VRA announced that they would be implementing changes to the metro network of the city from 2027 onwards. Lines would run more frequently, but one line had to be removed from the East Line tunnel to accommodate this increase, as the tunnel does not have the required capacity due to the safety requirements in place. Four options were provided, where Line 51 remained unchanged in two, re-routed to Gaasperplas in one, and completely removed in the last. In November, it was announced that Lines 50 and 53 would be combined into one continuous line from Isolatorweg to Gaasperplas, with Line 51 keeping its route. The changes would come into effect in December 2027, with the remaining lines receiving new numbers and colours; Line 51 was renumbered to M2 and recoloured to yellow.

== Services ==
=== Frequency ===
In the 2026 timetable, Line 51 is scheduled to keep its frequency the same as in the previous year and will run every 10 minutes for most of the day. The first trains in the early day start at Spaklerweg metro station towards Centraal Station, and at Amstelveenseweg metro station towards Isolatorweg.

Frequency
Early morning	Rush hour and daytime	Early evening	Late evening	Summer frequency
15 minutes 4x/hour	10 minutes 6x/hour	12 minutes 5x/hour	15 minutes 4x/hour	12 minutes 5x/hour

=== Route ===
Station	Transfers	Borough
Centraal Station	52 Line 52; 53 Line 53; 54 Line 54; Amsterdam–Rotterdam Line; Amsterdam–Schiphol Line; Amsterdam–Elten Line; Amsterdam–Zutphen Line; Amsterdam–Schiphol Line; Den Helder–Amsterdam Line	Centrum
Nieuwmarkt	53 Line 53; 54 Line 54	Centrum
Waterlooplein	53 Line 53; 54 Line 54	Centrum
Weesperplein	53 Line 53; 54 Line 54	Centrum
Wibautstraat	53 Line 53; 54 Line 54	Oost
Amstel	53 Line 53; 54 Line 54; Amsterdam–Arnhem Line	Oost
Spaklerweg	53 Line 53; 54 Line 54	Oost
Overamstel	50 Line 50	Oost
Station RAI	50 Line 50	Zuid
Station Zuid	50 Line 50; 52 Line 52; Weesp–Leiden Line	Zuid
Amstelveenseweg	50 Line 50	Zuid
Henk Sneevlietweg	50 Line 50	Nieuw-West
Heemstedestraat	50 Line 50	Nieuw-West
Station Lelylaan	50 Line 50; Amsterdam–Schiphol Line	Nieuw-West
Postjesweg	50 Line 50	Nieuw-West
Jan van Galenstraat	50 Line 50	Nieuw-West
De Vlugtlaan	50 Line 50	Nieuw-West
Station Sloterdijk	50 Line 50; Amsterdam–Rotterdam Line; Den Helder–Amsterdam Line; Amsterdam–Schiphol Line	Westpoort
Isolatorweg	50 Line 50	Westpoort

== Rolling stock ==
=== S1/S2 ===
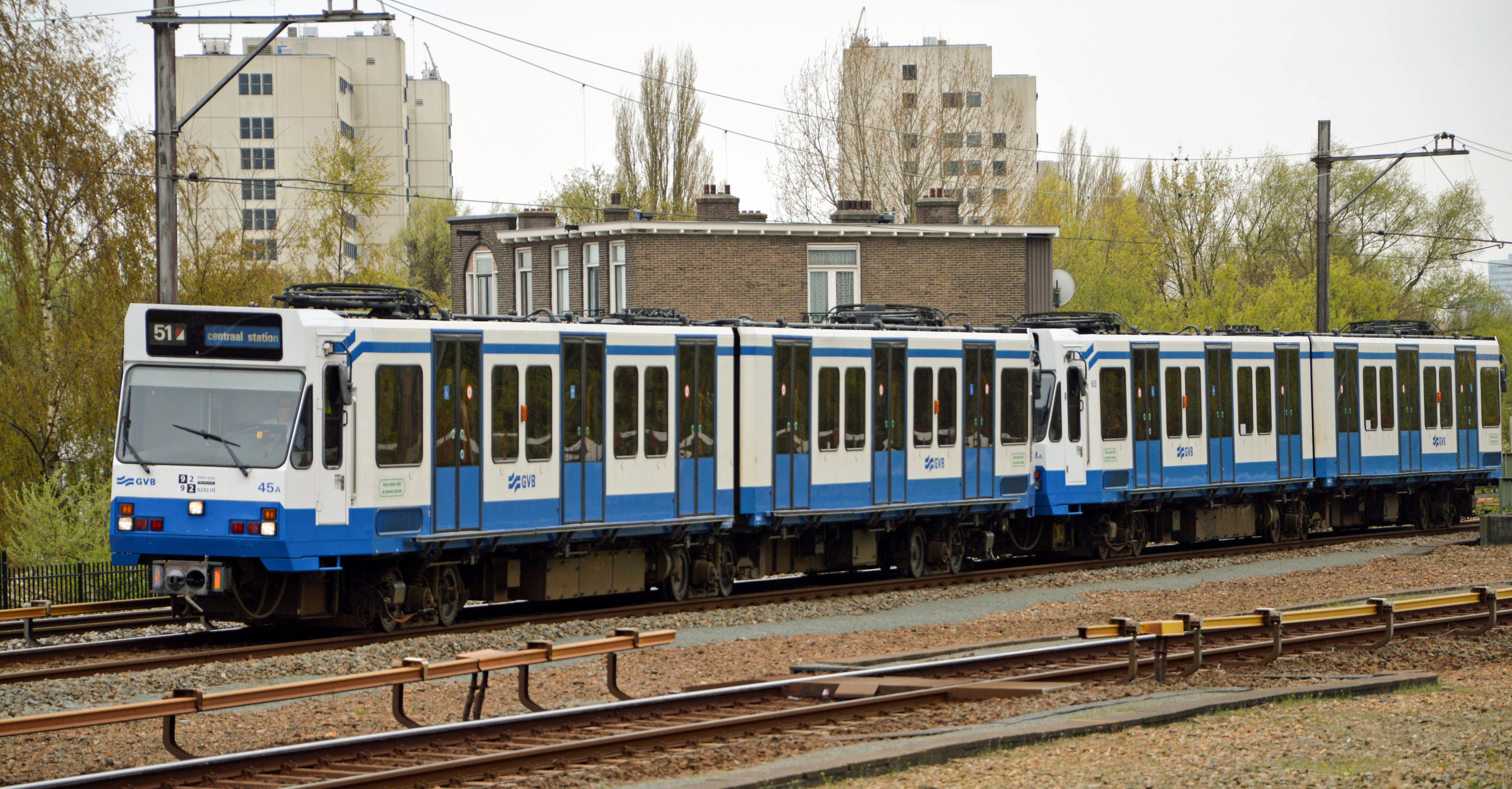
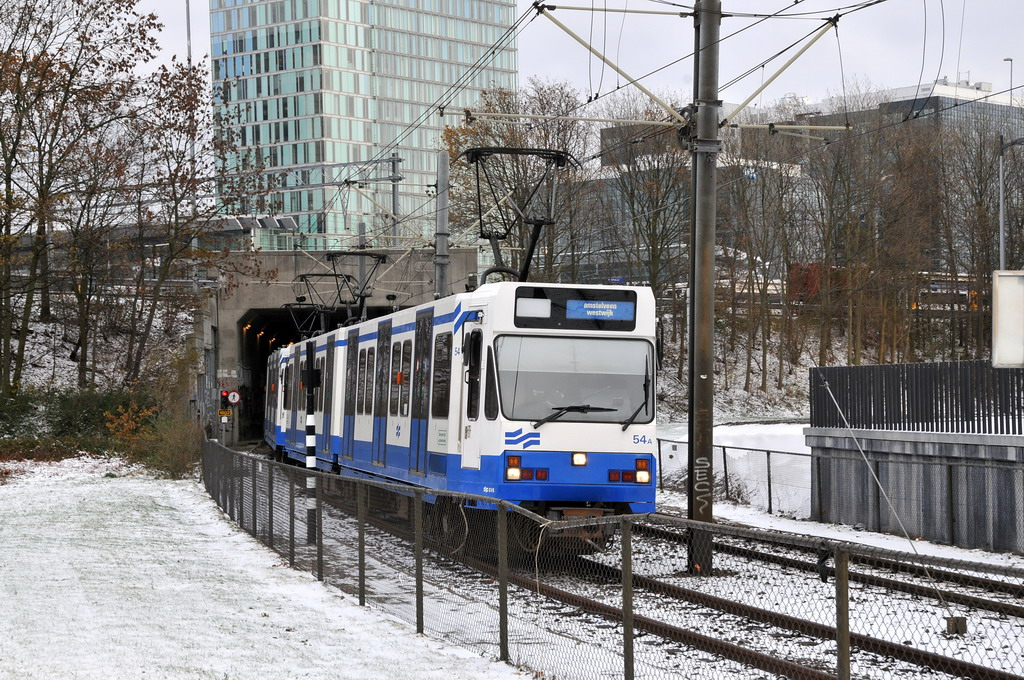
Units 45 (S1) and 63 (S2) coupled together on Line 51 near Amstel station, running on third rail (left) and two units running on overhead lines exiting the tunnel at Amsterdam Zuid (right).

Consisting of two cars, the S1/S2 units are 30 metres (98 ft) long and 2.65 metres (8.7 ft) wide. The first 13 units (45–57) are named S1 while the 12 units (58–69) from an additional order are named S2. Two units can be coupled together for operation in Amstelveen, while four can run together in the rest of the system. The tram platforms in Amstelveen were built for the width of the trains, while stations on the rest of the system were compatible for a width of 3 metres (9.8 ft). The units were fitted with retractable footboards to bridge the platform gap in those stations. The trains can reach a maximum speed of 70 km/h (43 mph).

Built by La Brugeoise et Nivelles (BN), 13 units of the type were ordered in 1988 only for use as Line 51. As the line was unusual, the trams were designed specifically for the GVB. In 1989, the municipality recalculated the number of trains needed to operate the line and came to the conclusion that an additional 12 units were needed. By the time the line opened, the ministry still had not allocated the required funding for the extra trains. The order was placed after funding was approved by the ministry in early 1991. There were problems with the retractable footboards caused by a design error. These were fixed by BN for free. GVB put the blame of the capacity and technical issues that occurred after the opening of the line on the constructor and considered asking for financial compensation. Two units arrived in 1993, while the remaining ten were delivered a year later. Capacity issues on the line were resolved following this as the trams started running coupled together in March 1994.

Express tram stock is expected to have a lifespan of 30 years or less given the complex operation required. By the 2010s, the units were considered to be prone to technical issues due to their age. Following the conversion of the express tram, the S1/S2 trains went through a technical upgrade for the final time and were used on regular metro lines. The trains were retired in April 2024, with the arrival of the newer M7 metros.

=== S3/M4 ===
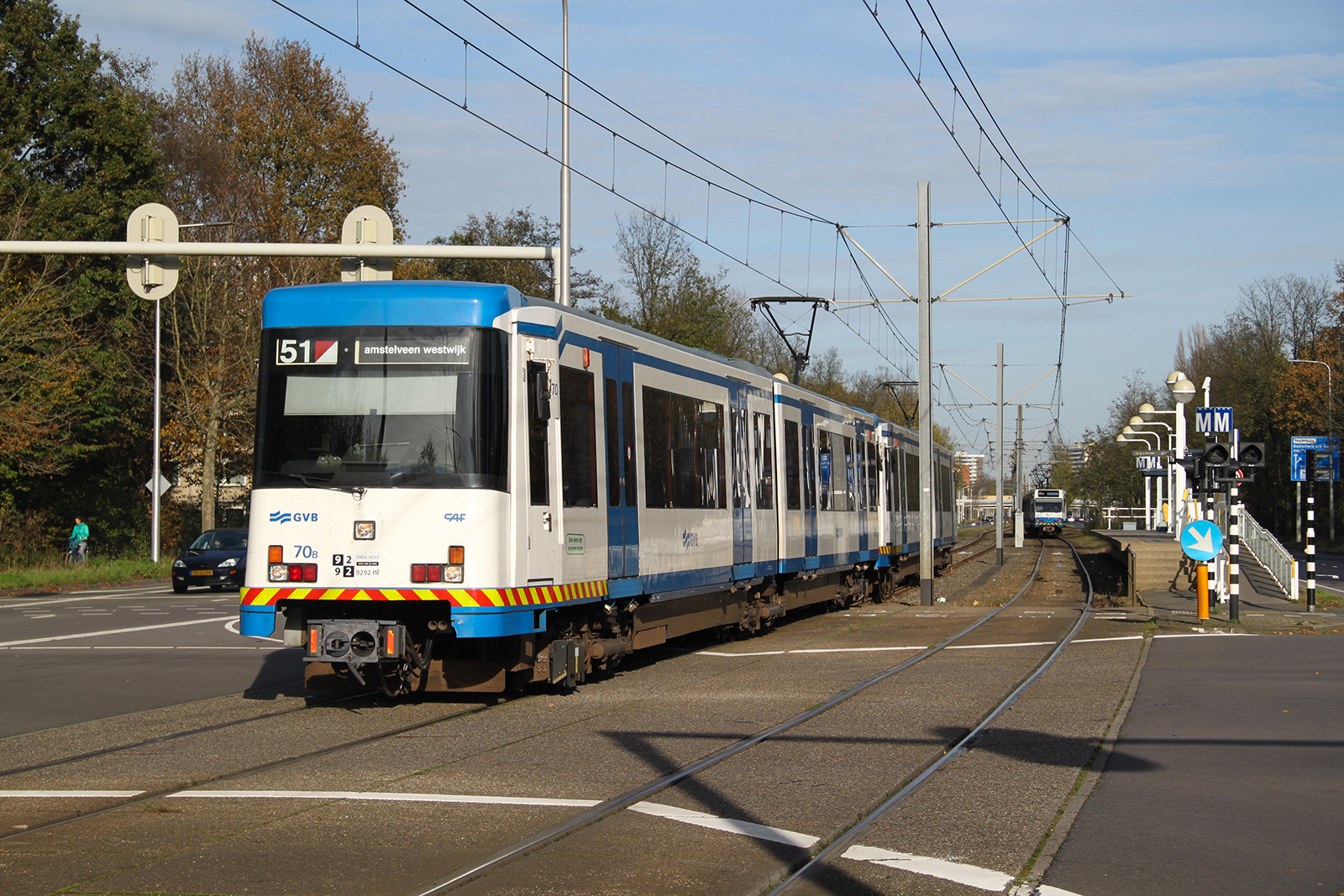
Two S3 units as express tram near Sportlaan

The S3/M4 units are 31 metres (102 ft) long and 2.65 metres (8.7 ft) wide. There are four S3 units (70–73) that can convert into an express tram and operate like the S1/S2, while the 33 M4 units (74–106) are solely in use as a metro on other lines with third rail pick up. Four units of the type can run coupled together, except in Amstelveen. The units were ordered in February 1994, and to be built by Construcciones y Auxiliar de Ferrocarriles. BN had also made an offer to deliver new units, but was not selected due to regular problems with the previous express trams.

The S3/M4 units were bought for the new Line 50, also known as the Ring Line, which was initially also called an express tram line despite being a full metro line without any level crossings. The stations on this line were built for the width of the trains, leading to the S3/M4 units also being fitted with retractable footboards like the S1/S2 to bridge the platform gap in other stations of the system. One unit was sent to the Netherlands in April 1996 and returned to Spain following testing. Deliveries of the type for operations was started and completed in 1997. While the trains operate at a speed of 70 km/h (43 mph), the units are technically capable of reaching 100 km/h (62 mph). The S3/M4 trains are set to go out of service by 2027 with the arrival of the newer M7 metros.

=== M5 ===
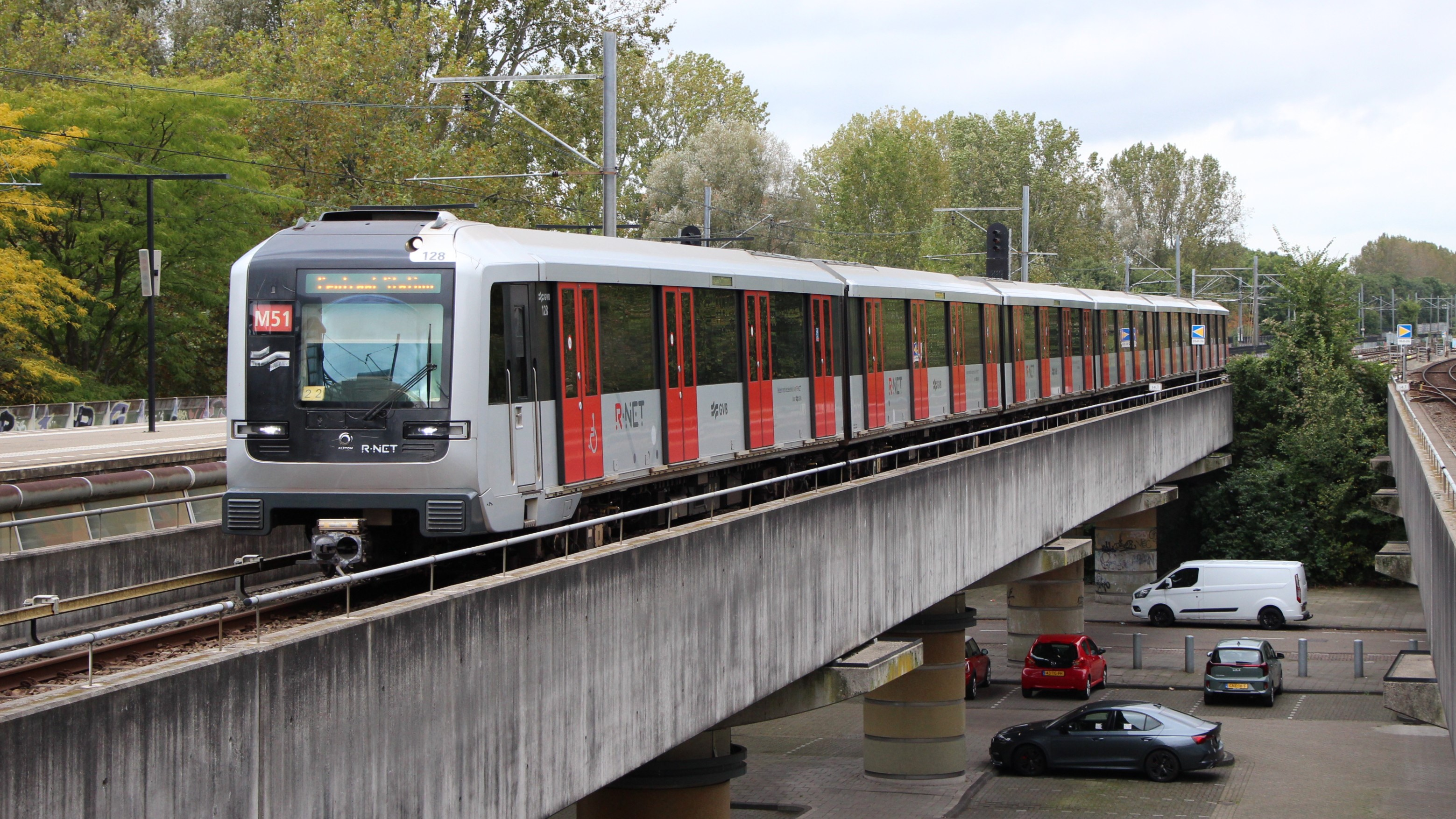
Trainset 127/128 approaching Amsterdam Lelylaan station

M5 units are 6 car trains based on the Metropolis family of trains by Alstom, with a length of 116 metres (381 ft) and width of 3 metres (9.8 ft). 23 of these trains were ordered in 2010 to replace the oldest type of metro in Amsterdam, the M1/M2/M3 series, as well as the brand new North–South Line. The first two were built by Alstom in France and the rest by Alstom Konstal in Poland. The trains include a higher ceiling and door height than the standard Metropolis units running in other countries. In early 2013, an additional five sets from Konstal were ordered, bringing the total number to 28 trains. The M5 trains started passenger service in June 2013. Each 6 car train set consists of two separate units which have their own number (107/108–161/162). The five additional trains are sometimes called an M6.

=== M7 ===
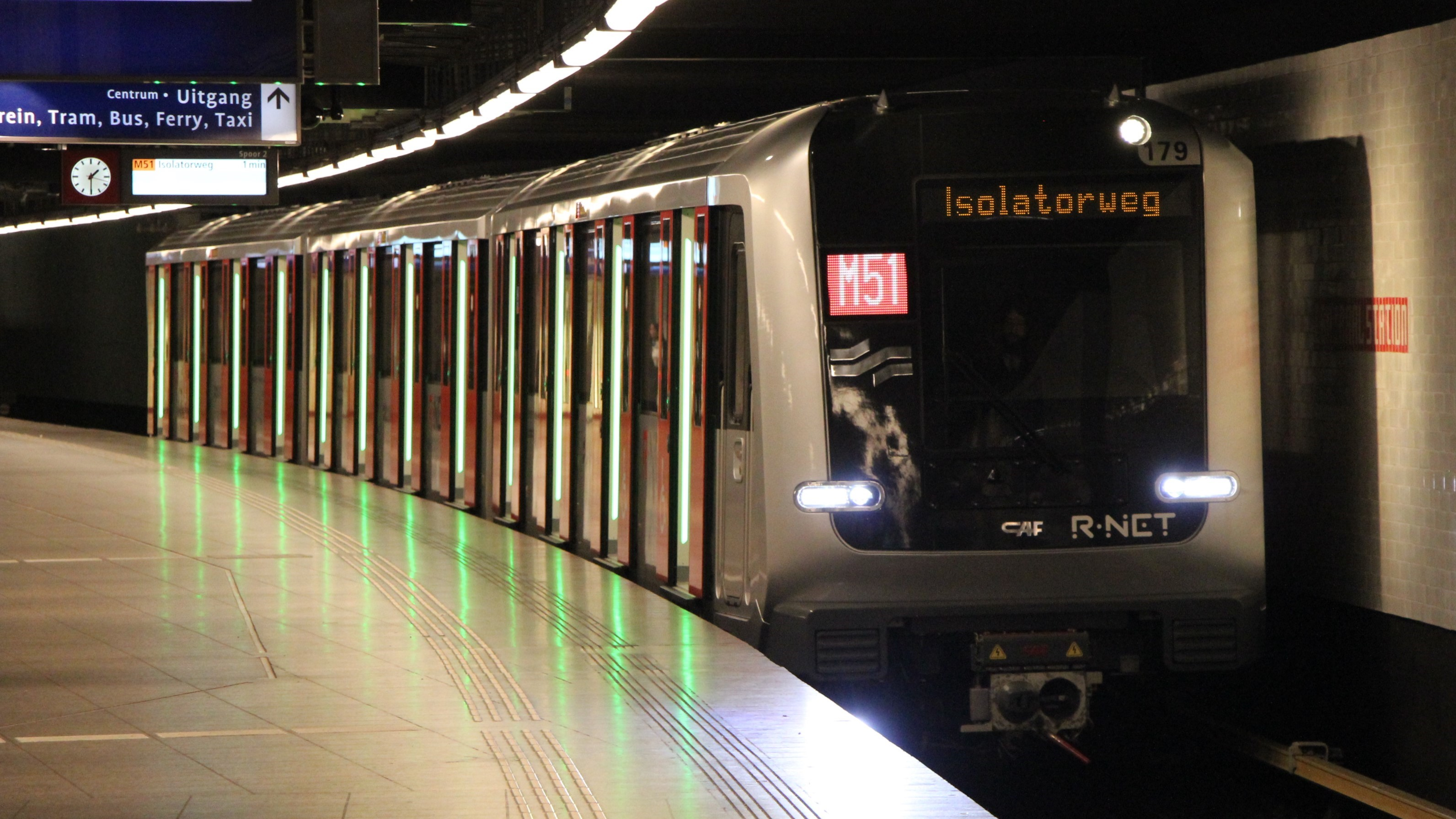
An M7 unit at Amsterdam Centraal station

M7 are 59.6 metres (196 ft) long trains based on the Inneo series of Construcciones y Auxiliar de Ferrocarriles and consist of 3 cars. 30 units were ordered initially in 2018, with an option for 30 more. 13 additional units were ordered in 2024, bringing the total to 43 trains (163–205). They have around half the capacity and length of an M5 train, but seem similar from the outside. M7 units were primarily bought to be able to run coupled during rush hours and as single units outside busy periods, which was more energy efficient and made planning maintenance easier. The first train went into service in March 2023 as a single unit. As a combination of two coupled M7 trains is 4 metres (13 ft) longer than a single M5 unit, the trains are too long for the screening panels that come down in case of a fire to stop the spread of smoke in the newly constructed Europaplein station of the North–South Line. Because of this, the M7 units are used on the Ring Line (M50 and M51) and East Line (M53 and M54) only.
