= Trams in Amsterdam =

Overview of the tram system of Amsterdam, Netherlands

Amsterdam Tram

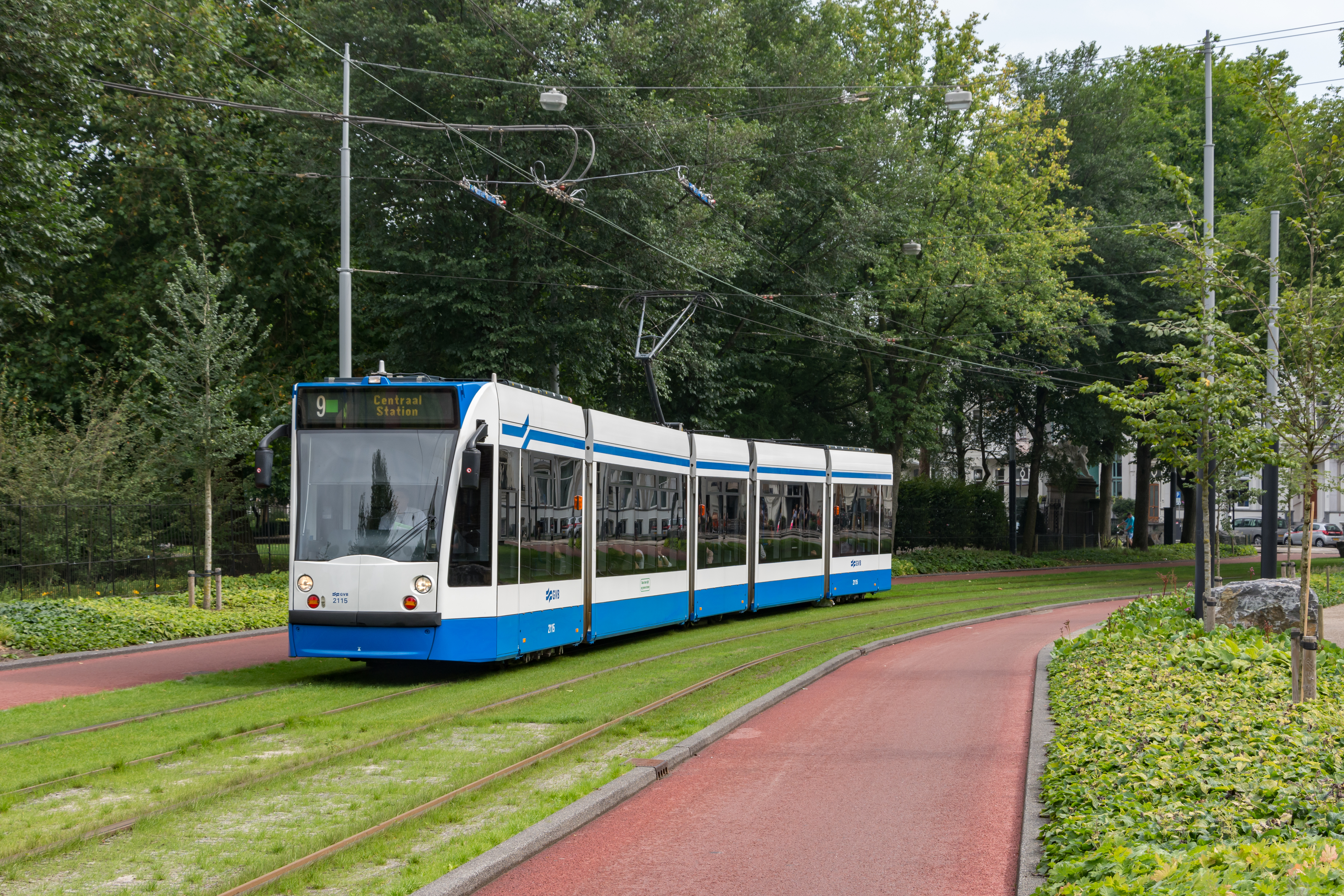
- Combino tram in the Plantage neighbourhood, in front of the Wertheimpark

Operation
- Locale: Amsterdam, Netherlands

Statistics
Horsecar era: 1875–1906/1916
- Status: Converted to electric operation
- Operators: Amsterdamsche Omnibus Maatschappij (AOM) (1875–1899); Gemeentetram Amsterdam (GTA) (1900–1916)
- Track gauge: 1,422 mm (4 ft 8 in)
- Propulsion system: Horses
Electric tram era: since 1900
- Status: Operational
- Lines: 14
- Operators: Gemeentetram Amsterdam (GTA) (1900–1942); GVB (since 1943)
- Track gauge: 1,435 mm (4 ft 8 1/2 in) standard gauge
- Propulsion system: Electricity
- Electrification: 600 V DC from overhead catenary
- Stock: 200
- Track length (single): 200 km (120 mi)
- Route length: 95 km (59 mi)
- Stops: 500
- Passengers in 2025: 91.2 million
- Website: Official website
Overview

The Amsterdam Tram (Dutch: Amsterdamse tram [ˌɑmstəɹˈdɑmsə tɾɛm]) is a tram network in Amsterdam, Netherlands. It dates back to 1875 and since 1943 has been operated by municipal public transport operator GVB, which also runs the Amsterdam Metro and the city bus and ferry services. Amsterdam has the largest tram network in the Netherlands and one of the largest in Europe.

== Network overview ==
The 15 tram lines within Amsterdam's tram network serve all boroughs in Amsterdam except for Amsterdam-Noord on the north side of the IJ and Amsterdam-Zuidoost. Tram lines 5 and 25 extend south of the borough of Amsterdam-Zuid to serve the municipalities of Amstelveen and Uithoorn, and tram line 19 extends east of the borough of Amsterdam-Oost to serve the municipality of Diemen.

Since April 2022, the fleet consists of 227 trams, of which 155 are Combinos (types 13G and 14G) from Siemens and 72 are Urbos 100 trams from Construcciones y Auxiliar de Ferrocarriles (type 15G). The first 15G trams ran on line 25. Trams of types 14G and 15G are bi-directional for use on lines 5 and 25 which have terminals without turning loops. All other tram lines have turning loops and use unidirectional trams. Lines 25 (Amsteltram) and 26 (IJtram) can operate trams coupled in pairs; both lines run in a right-of-way mostly separated from road traffic.

In 2020, the tram network consisted of 14 lines operating over 95 kilometres (59 mi) of routes and 200 kilometres (120 mi) of standard gauge track with 650 switches and 500 tram stops. The tram fleet travelled almost 12 million kilometres (7.5 million mi) while in service. Tram service consumed 45 million kilowatts of electricity per year, all produced from green sources.

== History ==
=== Beginnings ===
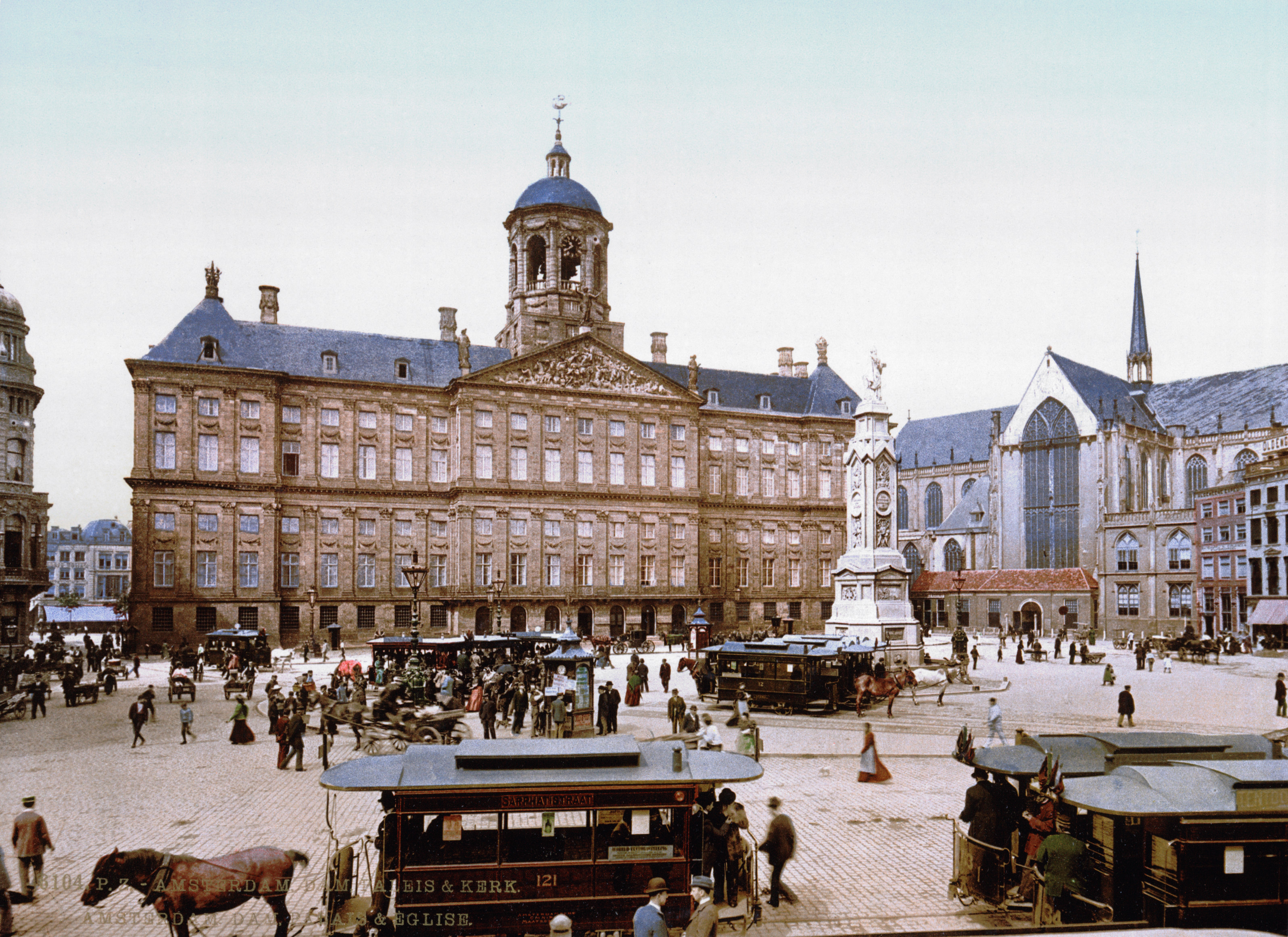
In the late 19th century, Dam Square was the centre of the horse-drawn tramway network.

On 3 June 1875, Amsterdam's first horse-drawn tramway was opened. It linked Plantage with the Leidseplein, and was operated by AOM (Amsterdamsche Omnibus Maatschappij), which had been founded in 1872 by Karel Herman Schadd, amongst others.

In the last quarter of the 19th century, horse trams ran through the main streets of Amsterdam, linking all neighborhoods inside the Singel with Dam Square, and were extended to newly constructed residential areas. By the end of the century, about 15 lines led to or from the Vondelstraat, Overtoom, Willemsparkweg, Amsteldijk, Linnaeusstraat, Weesperzijde, Bilderdijkstraat and Ceintuurbaan.

The lines of the original horse tram lines can still clearly be recognised in the present day tram routes 1, 2, 3, 4, 7, (9, 10) and 13.

=== Gemeentetram ===
As of 1 January 1900, the municipality of Amsterdam took over AOM. The company continued as the Gemeentetram Amsterdam (GTA). A total of 242 tramcars, 758 horses and 15 buildings were acquired along with the company.

On 14 August 1900, electric trams ran on what would known as line 10, the first electric tram line in Amsterdam. (Line 10 would run between Planciusstraat and Leidseplein until 2018.) By 1906, all but one of the existing tram lines were electrified. Additionally, the AOM's unusual track gauge of 1,422 mm (4 ft 8 in) was converted to 1,435 mm (4 ft 8 1/2 in) standard gauge.

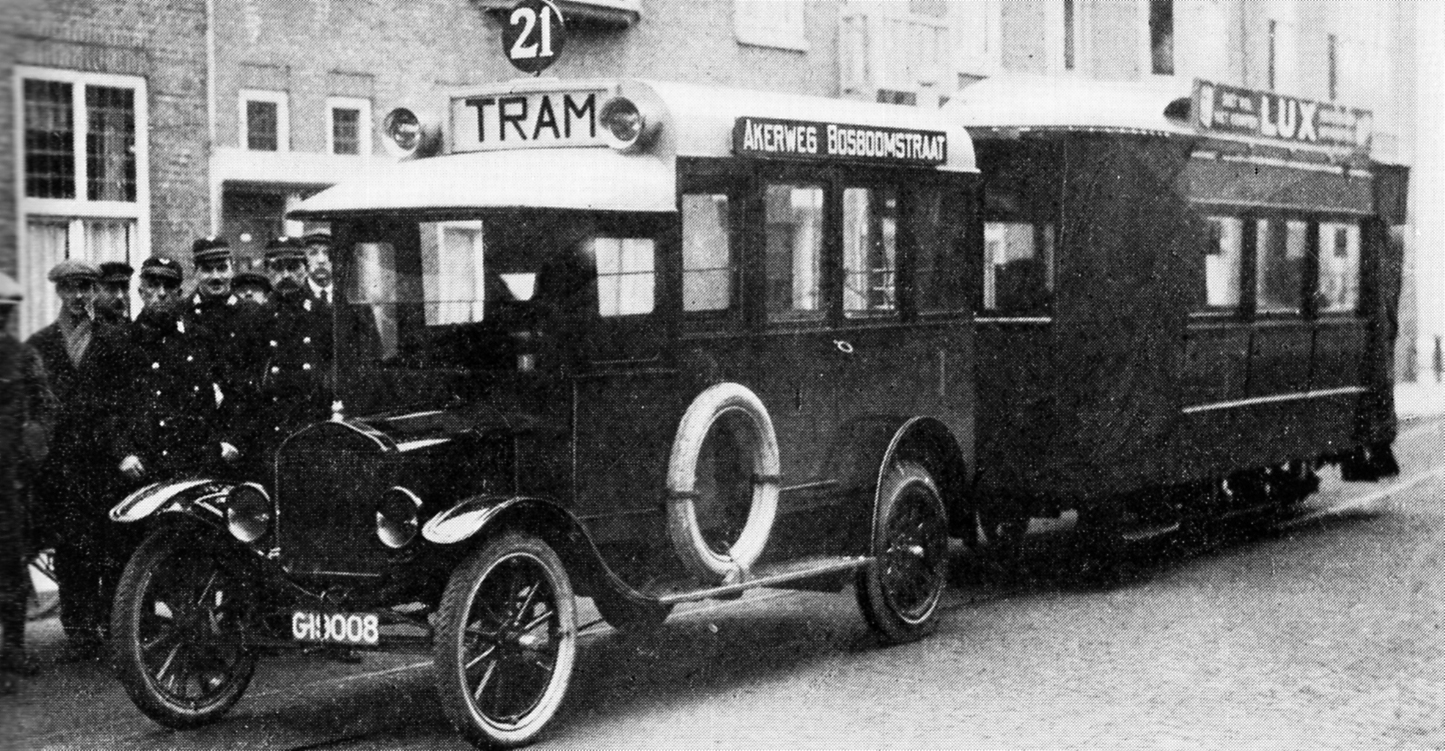
In 1922, the horses of the Sloten horsecar line were replaced by tram-hauling buses, such as this one in Jacob Marisstraat.

By 1906, the electric tram network consisted of 12 tram lines (1-11 and 13). To operate these lines, the GTA purchased 229 new electric tramcars. The former horse-drawn trams were progressively reclassified as tram trailers. In 1906, the Amsterdamse Tramharmonie orchestra (now known as Symfonisch Blaasorkest ATH) was founded. This orchestra, composed of amateur musicians from the Amsterdam region, still exists.

The last remaining Amsterdam horse tramway was line 12 (Nassauplein–Sloterdijk), which was electrified in 1916. Five years later, upon Amsterdam's annexation of the municipality of Sloten, a former Sloten horse tramway came under the control of the GTA. The horses of this line, which linked Overtoom with Sloten, were replaced by tram-hauling buses in 1922; the line was converted into a conventional bus line in 1925.

=== Further developments ===
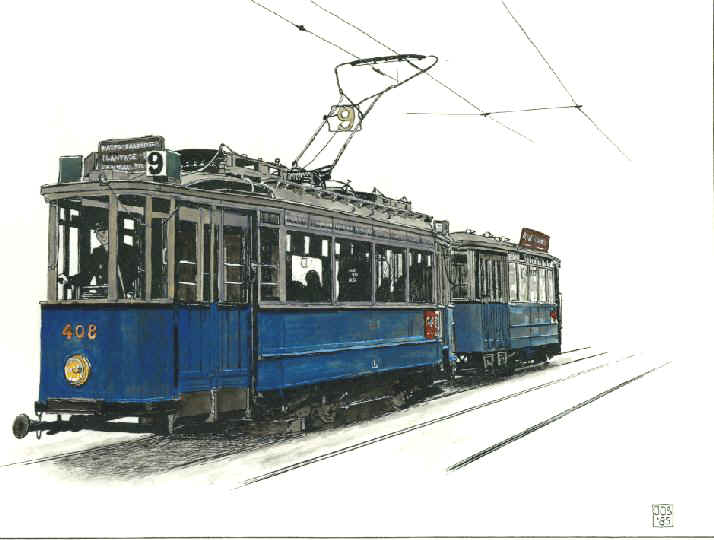
A twin axle tram in 1929; this tram type was used until 1968.

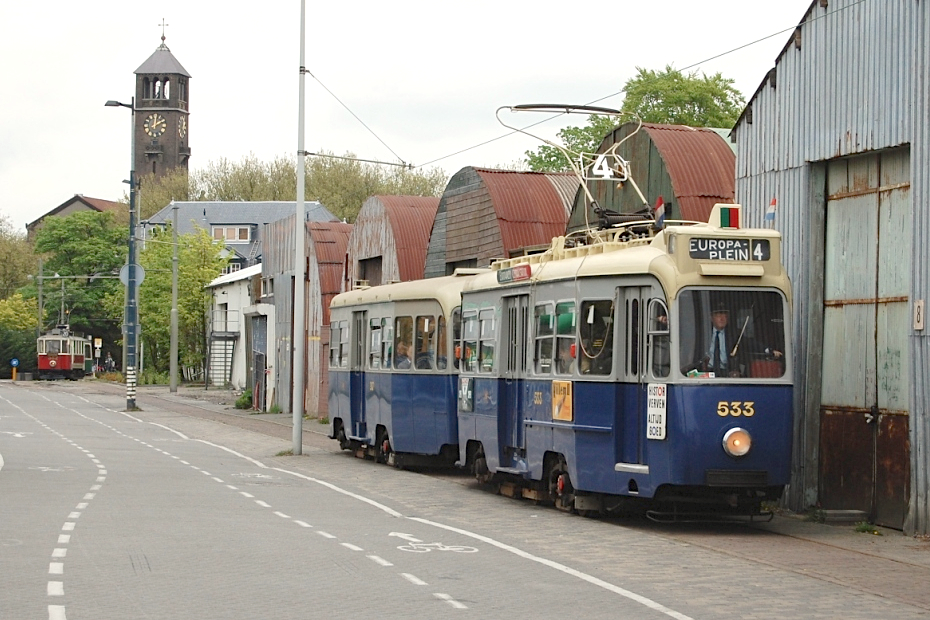
Drieasser 3-axle tram cars 533+987 at the Electric Tramway Museum Amsterdam, at Haarlemmermeerstation (Haarlemmermeer railway station). This tram type was used between 1948 and 1983.

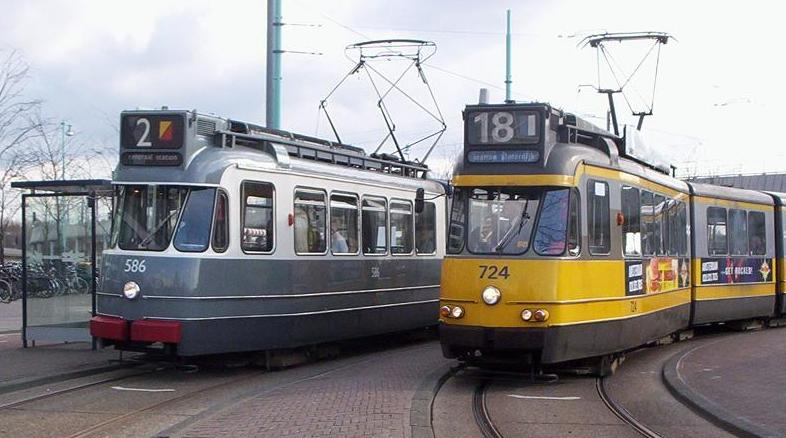
Articulated trams in Amsterdam: Zesasser 6-axle in the original grey, and bi-articulated in yellow.

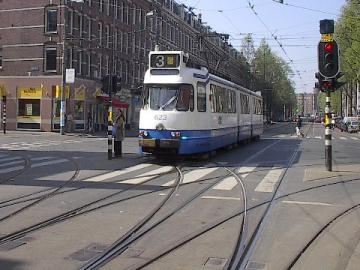
Old articulated tram at the Ceintuurbaan / Ferdinand Bolstraat intersection. This tram type was used between 1957 and 2004.

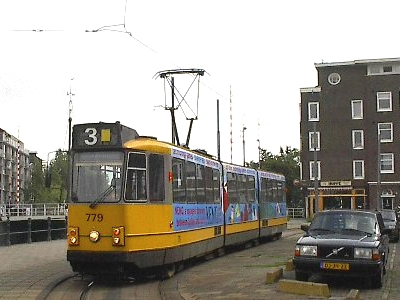
Yellow Amsterdam tram, series 725–779. This tram type was used between 1974 and 2003. The line colour is shown beside the line number.

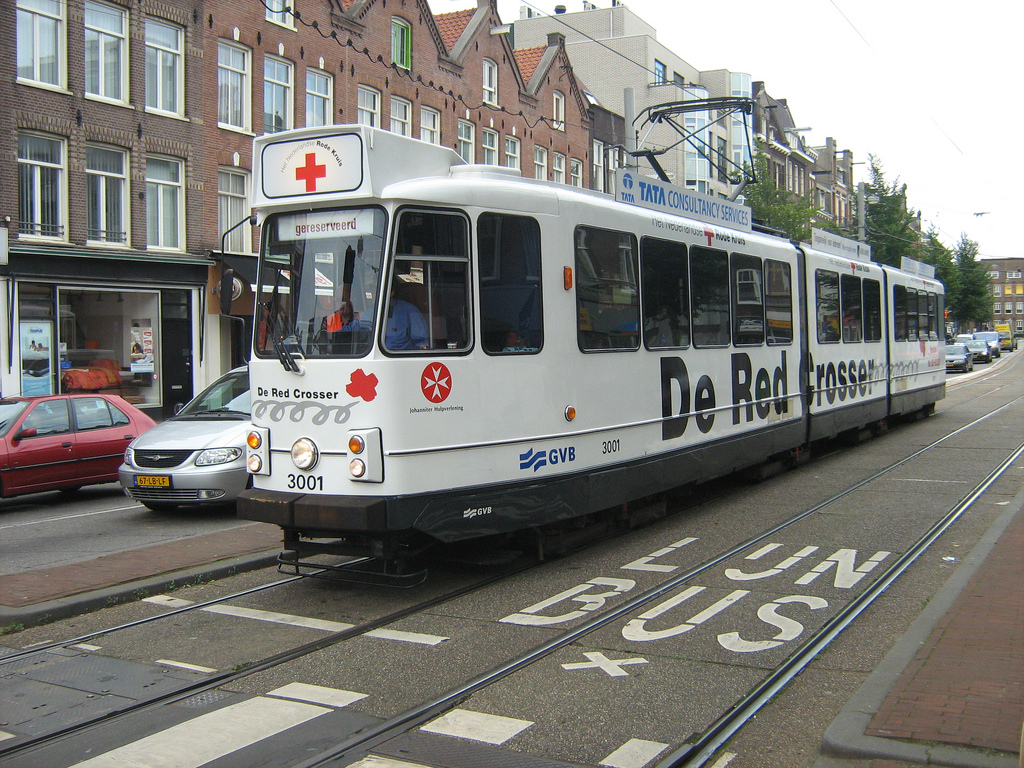
'De Red Crosser' 3001 (ex-767) with facilities serving people with disabilities (including a lift). This tram was used between 2003 and 2016.

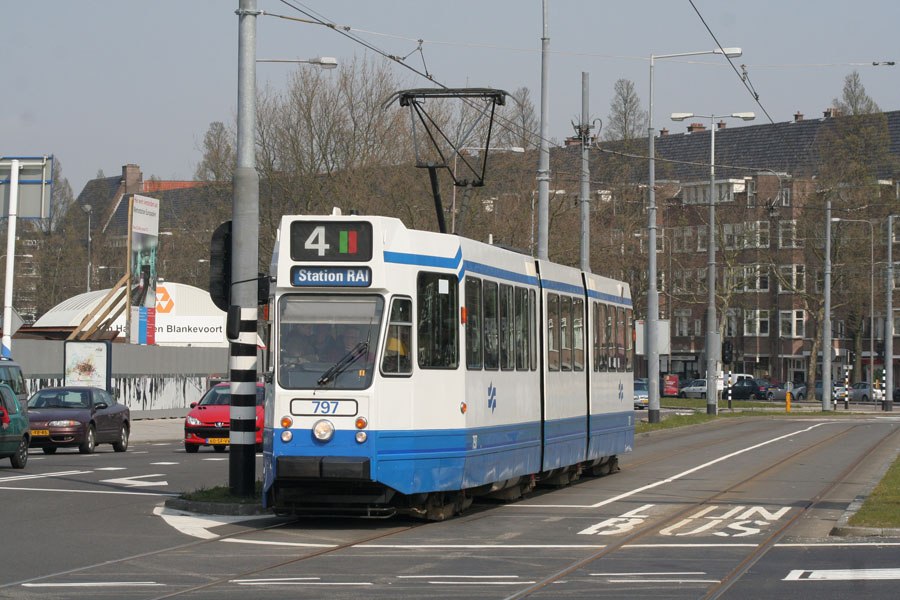
Achtasser bi-articulated no 797 on the Europaplein in Amsterdam-Zuid. This tram type was used between 1979 and 2015.

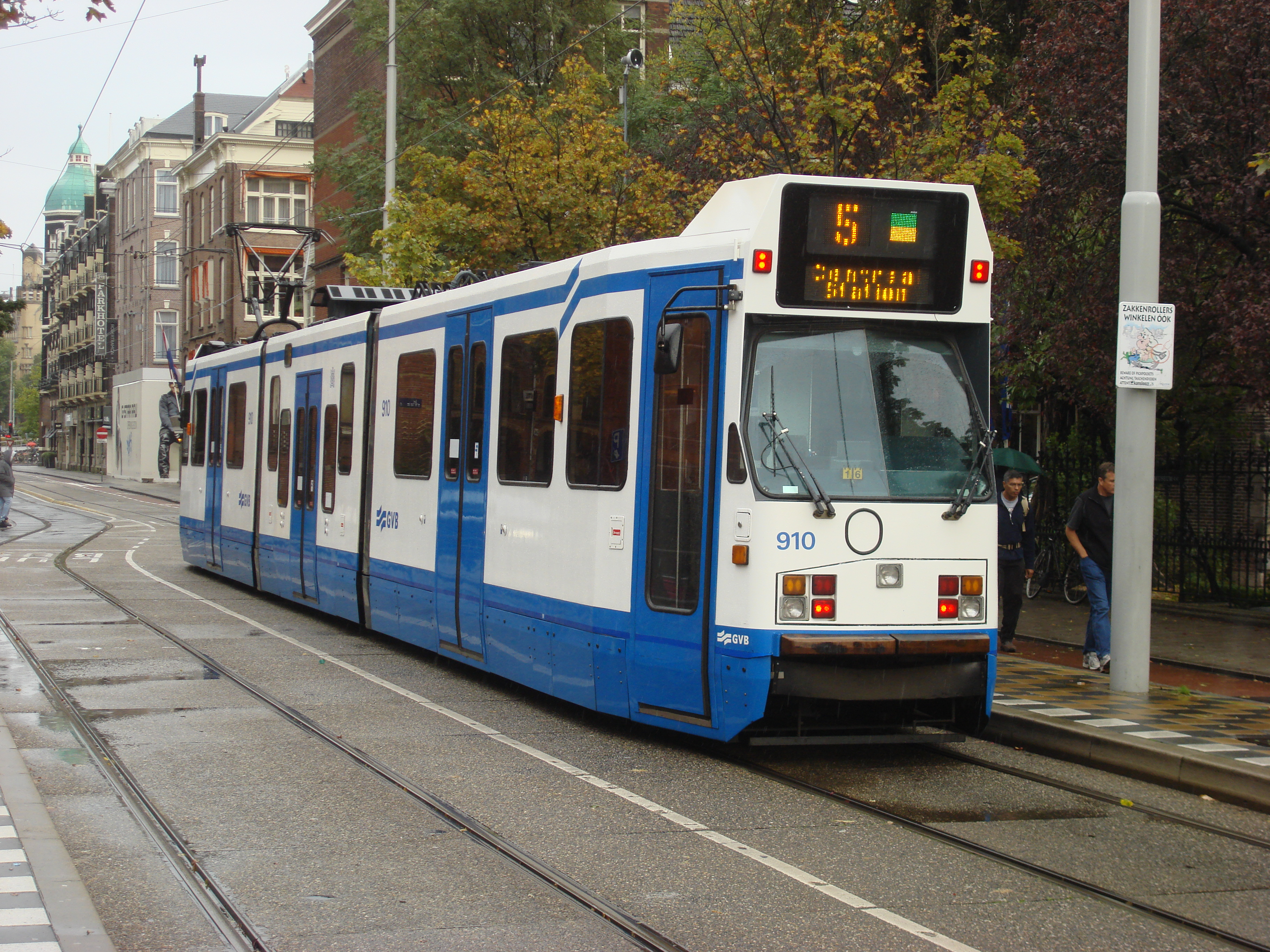
Amsterdam tram line 5 from central Amstelveen to central Amsterdam with bidirectional BN-tram built in 1989.

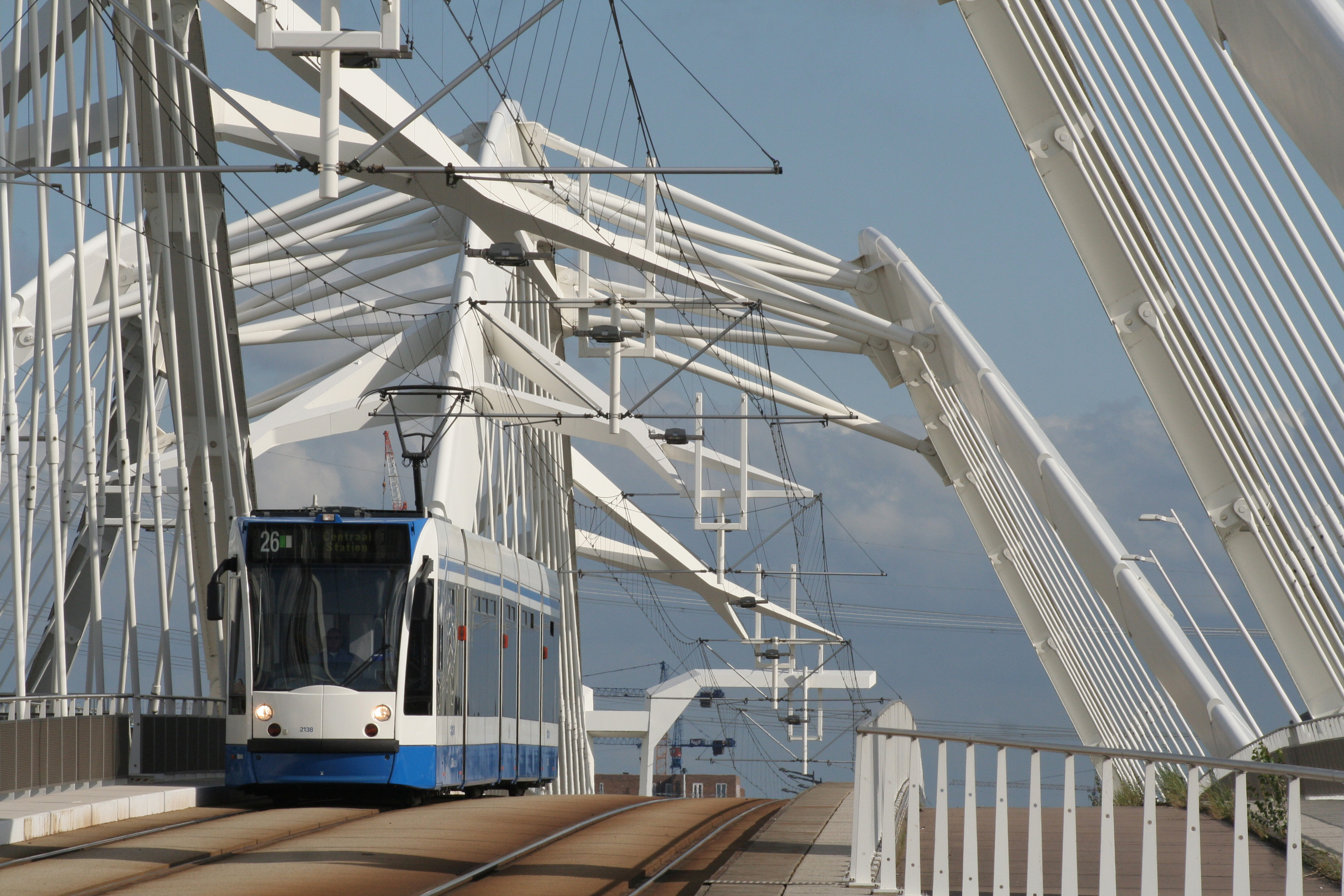
A Combino on the newest Amsterdam tram line, Line 26, opened in 2005, to the new district of IJburg.

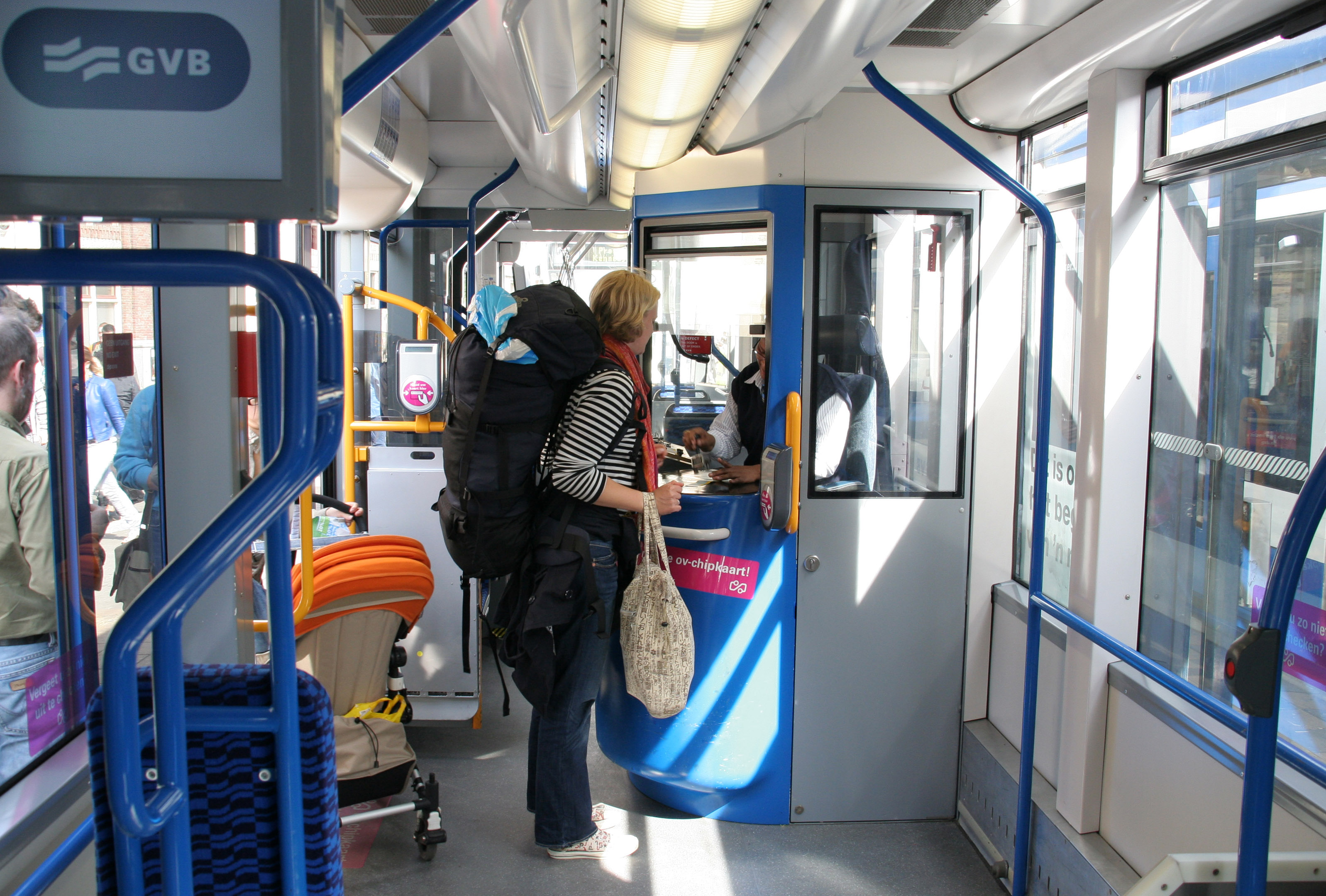
Interior of an Amsterdam Combino with conductor's cabin.

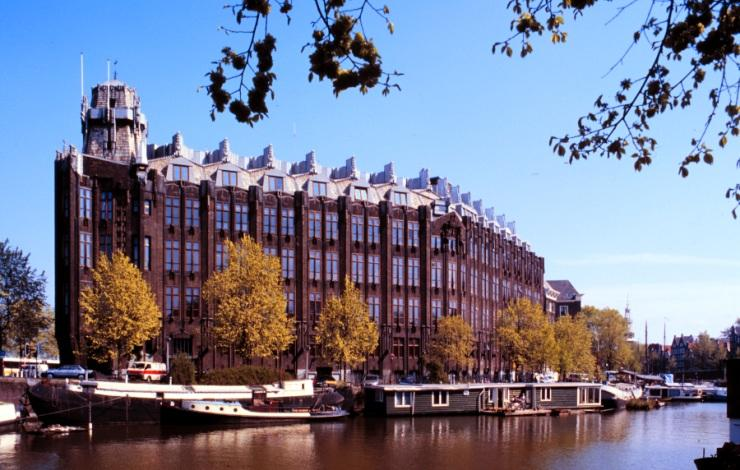
The Scheepvaarthuis.

The proposed network for 2018, after the opening of the North–south line.

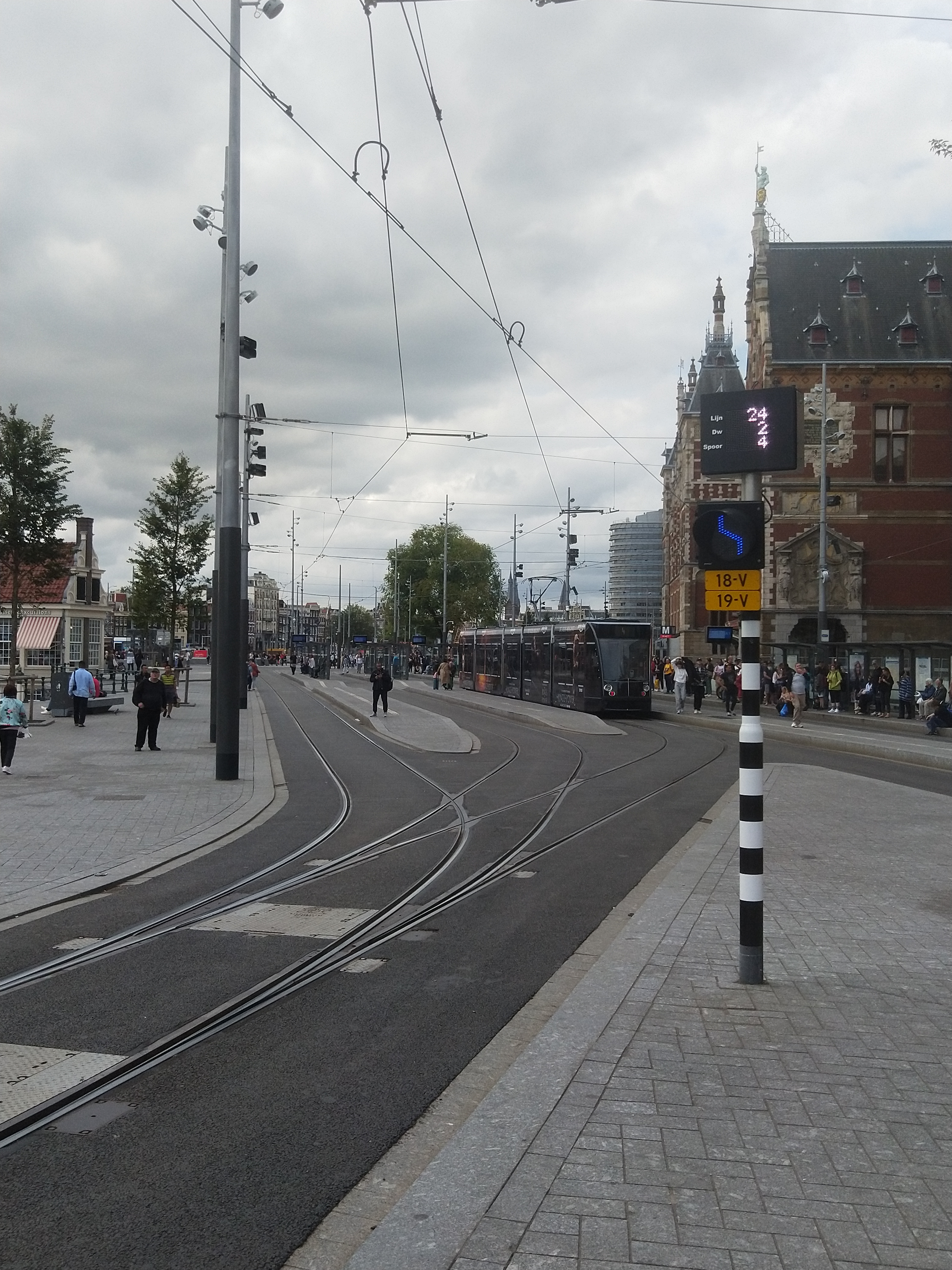
A 3-way Hanning & Kahl point-setting system at Amsterdam Centraal station. It automatically sends trams arriving at stand A to the correct platform. The indicator on the right displays "Lijn 24, Spoor 4". The points are accordingly set to send the next tram, on route 24 to De Boelelaan/VU, into the platform 4 on the left. Meanwhile, a tram 4 to RAI waits at platform 2

Between 1910 and 1930, the growth of the city generated many new extensions to the tram lines. The first thirteen electrified tram lines were joined by: line 14 in 1910, lines 15–18 in 1913, line 19 in 1916, lines 22 and 23 in 1921, line 20 in 1922, line 21 in 1928, line 24 in 1929 and line 25 in 1930.

In 1931, the tramway network reached its greatest extent, at 25 tram lines. From that year to 1940, (almost) all the districts in the city could be reached by tram. Between 1900 and 1930, the fleet grew to 445 motorised trams and approximately 350 trailers. These were all twin axle vehicles with wooden bodies.

From 1922 until 1971, all trams had mailboxes at their rear side. These were emptied at Centraal Station; the post office's distribution centre was located next to the station, at Stationsplein, and later at Oosterdokskade. Thanks to the tram mailboxes, a letter could be delivered on time, even if it is too late for the last collection from the regular mailboxes.

During the Great Depression of the 1930s, the tram service was reduced. In 1932, lines 12, 15, 19, 20 and 21 were abandoned. However, as part of the Eastern Railway Works (Spoorwegwerken Oost) in 1939–1942, trams came to the new neighborhoods in Amsterdam-Oost, to serve the Watergraafsmeer, the new Amstel station and the rebuilt Muiderpoort station.

On 1 January 1943, the GTA merged with the Gemeenteveren to form GVB.

Between 1940 and 1945, the trams carried big crowds and faced a crisis. Several lines had to be suspended (lines 4, 6, 8 and 14), before the whole service ceased in October 1944 due to a coal shortage. Many tram cars were transported eastward.

=== Postwar period ===
Following the end of World War II, tram services were resumed in June 1945, initially with only limited service (lines 1, 3, 5, 7, 9, 10, 12, 13, 16, 24, 25). Line 5 was split into line 5 and line 12. Some lines were returned to service in later years: lines 2, 17 and 18 (in 1947) and 4 (in 1948). Between 1945 and 1949, the emergency line 26 was the tram line with the highest line number, followed by line 11. In 1948 and 1949, a special tram S ran as an express service from line 25 to Amstel station.

Tram lines 6 and 23 did not return to regular service, but operated intermittently until 1958 for transportation to the stadium. Lines 8, 14 and 22, used during the war, were not reactivated as tram lines, although line 22 was revived in 1950 as a bus line.

Between 1948 and 1950, the GVB acquired sixty motorised trams and fifty trailers, known as the three axles (drieassers). They were built by Werkspoor in Utrecht-Zuilen, and replaced the then oldest trams in the fleet, which had entered service in 1902.

After a period of reconstruction in the 1940s, one tram line after another was shut down in the 1950s. Buses were considered to be more practical. Thus, between 1950 and 1965 lines 18, 12, 11, 17 and 5 (provisionally in 1961, finally in 1965) were replaced, in that order, by bus services. Only the Leidsestraat and Utrechtsestraat remained served by tram lines (lines 1, 2 and 4), which were necessary because these streets were too narrow for buses.

=== Revival ===
In the mid-1950s, (modern) tramcars came back into the spotlight. The 25 articulated trams ordered in 1955 to serve only the Leidsestraat lines 1 and 2 were well received, and secured the future of trams in Amsterdam. Between 1957 and 1968, 160 new articulated vehicles, manufactured by Beijnes and Werkspoor in the Netherlands, were added to the fleet; they were numbered 551-587 and 602–724. The old twin axle trams from the prewar period were withdrawn from service between 1945 and 1968.

=== Extensions ===
After the trams had returned to favour in the inner city, the newly created Western Garden Cities (Westelijke Tuinsteden) in the west of Amsterdam were connected with its tramway network: Bos en Lommerplein in 1950, Slotermeer in 1954, and Osdorp in 1962.

There were also some other new tram lines with line numbers that had long since disappeared or had never existed. Line 17, which was closed in 1956, was revived in 1962 (to Osdorp), when line 27 appeared on the old route of line 17. In October 1971, line 1 was extended to Osdorp. Line 27 disappeared in 1971. In 1977, upon the opening of Amsterdam's first metro line, lines 6 and 12 appeared. In 1978, with the opening of Station Zuid, came line 5, and in 1982, a new line 14 (to Station Sloterdijk) was opened, forty years after the lifting of the original line 14.

Other changes also occurred. In 1971, the tramway postal service was abandoned. In 1972–1973, the first group of articulated trams were extended by the addition of a middle section, to become bi-articulated trams. Also in the early 1970s, two series of new trams were ordered from Linke-Hofmann-Busch in Salzgitter, Germany, to operate the new western extensions. In 1974–1975, nos 725-779 entered the fleet, and in 1979–1981, nos 780-816 joined them.

By the early 1980s, the GVB had 252 bi-articulated trams available for use, at that time the highest number in any city in Europe. In 1983, after only 35 years - a short time for the Amsterdam tramway network - the three axle trams operated their last services; they had never been liked by the tram personnel. Between 1981 and 1983, the GVB also lost four other trams, when they were destroyed by fires started by rioting squatters.

Meanwhile, further western extensions of the network were opened, to Geuzenveld in 1974, Slotervaart-Zuid in 1975, Nieuw Sloten in 1991 and De Aker in 2001. Other enhancements were to: Station Zuid in 1978, Flevopark in 1980, Station RAI in 1981, Station Sloterdijk in 1982 (extended in 1985), and a second connection with Bos en Lommer/Slotermeer in 1989.

In 1985, a tram line was built to Haarlemmerhouttuinen, but not connected to other tracks, nor equipped with overhead wires. Thirty years later, it had still not entered into service.

=== New technology ===
In 1989–1991, to replace the oldest articulated trams, and to operate new lines, 45 articulated vehicles (numbers 817-841 and 901–920) were built by BN in Bruges, Belgium. They were Amsterdam's first (partly) low-floor trams. During the same period came the first withdrawals of the first articulated trams from 1957, apart from a few vehicles that had previously had been damaged by fire or a collision. Additionally, a number of the 1974-1975 LHB vehicles were removed from service.

In 1990, a new tramway to Buitenveldert and Amstelveen was ready to go. Line 5 links Station Zuid with Amstelveen Binnenhof, while line 51 ran as a light rail service, from Station Zuid to Amstelveen Poortwachter, and later to Westwijk in 2004. Also in 1990, line 9 to the Watergraafsmeer was extended to Diemen (Sniep). In 1991, a rush hour line 20 and a special events line 11 were opened. In 1993 a support line 11 and in 1997 a circle line 20 were added to the network. Lines 6, 11 (2 lines) and 20 have since disappeared. However, line 11 is still used occasionally for extra services to the RAI convention centre.

Between 2002 and 2004, following an order for 155 Siemens Combino trams (nos 2001-2151 and 2201–2204), the existing tram fleet was largely renewed. Four of the Combinos were specified as bidirectional vehicles, for use on line 5 to Amstelveen. By mid-2004, 155 Combinos had been delivered. As a result, the last old articulated cars of the 1960s were removed from service in March 2004. However, between 2004 and 2008 all of the Combinos had to be taken progressively out of service for repairs and strengthening, to correct their many structural faults.

In 2022 a Hanning & Kahl 3-way point-setting system was installed to direct trams on routes 4, 14 and 24 to the correct track in stand A at Centraal Station.

=== Changes 2001—2016 ===
In December 2001, line 1 was extended to the new district of De Aker, and line 17 replaced line 1 on the route between Osdorpplein and Dijkgraafplein. For a lengthy period, line 24 was diverted via line 16, and line via line 4, during the construction of the De Pijp metro station on Ferdinand Bolstraat. In December 2002, line 6 was diverted to call at Centraal Station in place of Stadionplein, and in November 2003, line 16 was extended from Stadionplein to the VU Medisch Centrum.

In May 2004, line 10 was extended/diverted to Java-eiland (Azartplein). Lines 7 and 14 was later rerouted to Amsterdam-Oost (with a terminus at Flevopark). In December 2004, line 6 started sharing a terminus with line 16 at VU Medisch Centrum (Gustav Mahlerlaan). Since that month, line 7 has been sharing the Sloterpark terminus of line 14; the former line's terminus had earlier moved to Surinameplein, because the turning loop at Bos and Lommerplein had been closed.

On 30 May 2005, a new line, the IJ-tram (line 26) was opened (Centraal Station – Piet Heintunnel – IJburg, a distance of 8.5 km (5.3 mi)) and (initially) line 16 was extended from CS to the Passagiersterminal (for cruise ships). Twelve months later, line 6 was closed, and the route CS–Passagiersterminal was taken over by line 25 from line 16 (it was later curtailed again to CS). In December 2006, line 24 was extended from Olympiaweg to VU Medisch Centrum.

In October 2011, a new turning loop for line 16 and 24 was installed at the De Boelelaan/VU stop. It replaced the loop at Gustav Mahlerlaan, which was required to give way to a new building.

In December 2013, tram line 25 between Centraal Station and President Kennedylaan in the Rivierenbuurt neighbourhood was discontinued. Tram lines 4 and 12 also ran between Rivierenbuurt and Centraal Station, and their service frequency was increased.

In May 2015, tram line 24 between Centraal Station and VU Medisch Centrum was temporarily discontinued. It has since been reinstated and line 16 ceased instead.

=== Changes since 2017 ===
==== 2017 changes related to the opening of the North-South subway line ====
When the new metro North–South line (line 52) opened on 22 July 2018, the GVB's and Amsterdam "City Region" ('Stadsregio')'s policy was that the metro use should be emphasized, that is, that travelers traveling across the city would, in general, be expected to take the metro more as part of their journey and transfer between the metro and trams and buses.

The new tram network thus consisted of 14 tram lines. Fewer trams ran on the lines between Centraal Station, the southern part of the city center and Amsterdam-Zuid borough. Meanwhile, more trams would run in the areas surrounding the city center. The route Leidseplein—Weteringschans–Sarphatistraat –Weesperplein became the busiest tram route portion with three lines serving it.

Lines 9, 10 and 16 were discontinued while lines 11 and 19 were reintroduced:

- Line 11 is the same route as line 1 but with its western terminus at Surinameplein
- Line 19 is a combination of lines 9, 10 and 12, connecting Amsterdam Sloterdijk with Diemen (Sniep) via Leidseplein and Weesperplein

The routes of lines 1, 3, 5, 7, 12 and 14 were partially changed, while lines 2, 4, 13, 17, 24 and 26 remained unchanged. In a few streets no trams ran anymore, such as in Bos en Lommerweg (line 14), Mozes en Aäronstraat (line 14), Paleisstraat (line 14), or along Albert Cuypstraat–Ruysdaelstraat–Johannes Vermeerstraat–Gabriël Metsustraat–De Lairessestraat–Cornelis Krusemanstraat–Amstelveenseweg up to Stadionplein (line 16). Except for the Witte de Withstraat, where the removal of tram rails was the cause of the removal of line 7 to Postjesweg– Hoofdweg, the rails were kept in place in case of detours, trips to the tram shed or possible future route changes.

==== Other changes since 2017 ====
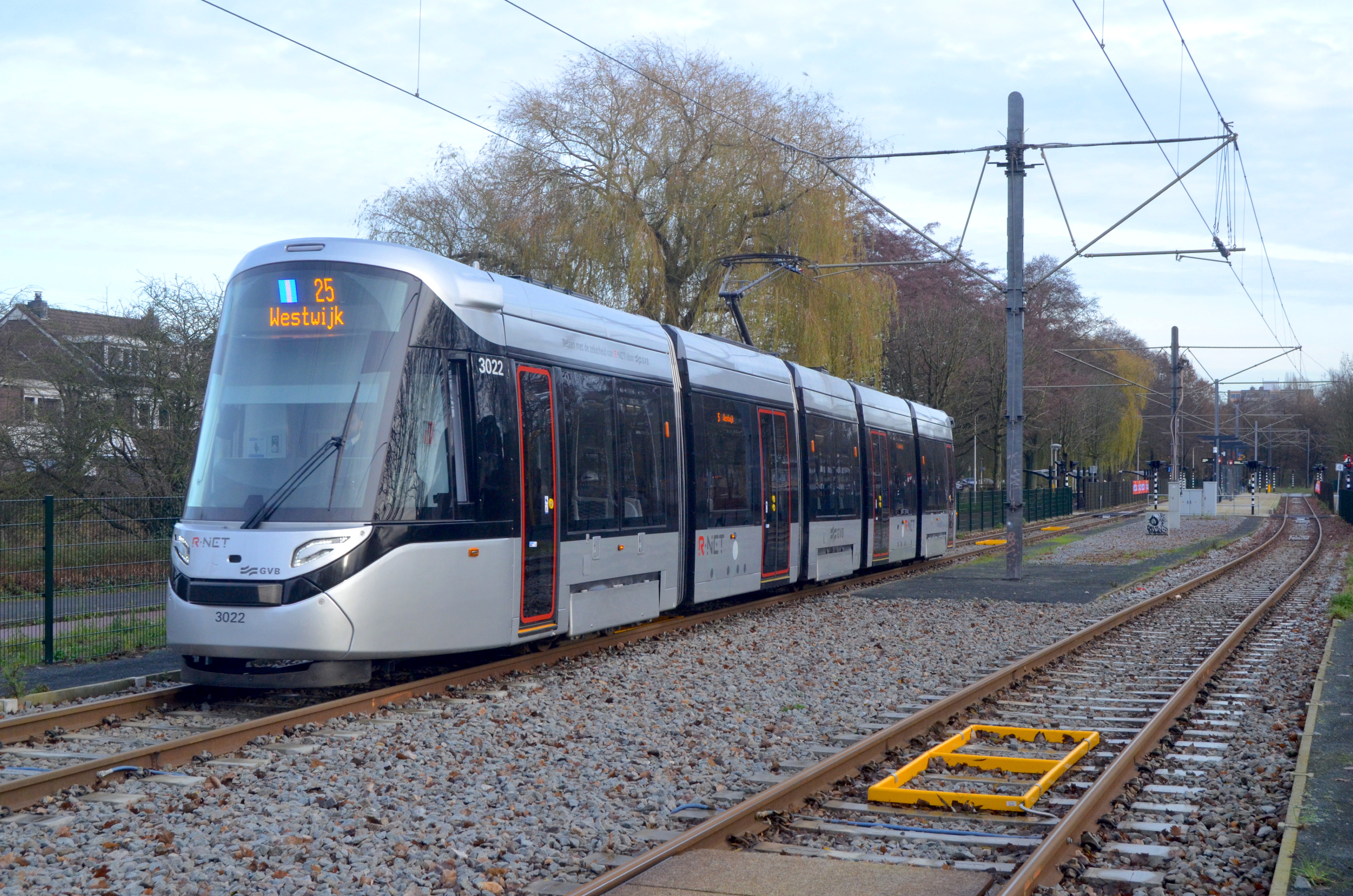
Line 25 on opening day with 15G tram leaving stop Amstelveen Poortwachter.

In 2017, the line 24 track over a 140-metre (460 ft) section of Ferdinand Bolstraat, between Stadhouderskade and Albert Cuypstraat, was rebuilt from double-track to single-track. This change was made to provide more space for pedestrians and cyclists. During the rebuild, a tram stop was moved closer to Marie Heinekenplein.

Also in 2017, the GVB started testing the use of coupled pairs of trams on line 26. They were put into service 28 September 2020.

In 2018, the GVB replaced the conductor cabins on 151 Combino trams with modern, open service counters, that would give a more welcoming feel. These conversions took 15 hours per tram and were performed in the Lekstraat depot.

In March 2018 work started to build an alternative turning circle for tram 26 on the IJ side of Centraal Station, for use when events such as the Dam tot Damloop block Stationsplein. It was completed in October 2019 in time for the track relaying of Stationsplein in 2020.

On 3 March 2019, the light rail line through Amstelveen (formerly metro line 51 a.k.a. Amstelveenlijn) closed to convert it into a new tram line to Westwijk to go into service as line 25 officially opened on 13 December 2020. (Unofficially, it went into service on 9 December 2020.) Line 25 will later be extended further south to Uithoorn.

On 27 May 2019 a rush-hour tram line 6 was introduced between Amsterdam Zuid station and Amstelveen Stadshart. Because metro line 51 was discontinued and, because the replacement bus service between De Boelelaan/VU and Oranjebaan doesn't stop, line 5 became overcrowded. Following 6 November 2020, tram line 6 was discontinued due to low ridership. It was originally scheduled to be replaced by tram line 25 upon the latter's opening on 13 December 2020.

Starting 23 March 2020, tram line 11 (Central Station – Leidseplein – Surinameplein) was suspended due to a drop in ridership, and was definitively cancelled by the end of that year. The GVB recommended that riders take tram 1 between Surinameplein and Leidseplein, and tram 2 or 12 between Leidseplein and Centraal Station.

On 7 February 2021, snowstorm Darcy caused the shutdown of the entire Amsterdam tram system. By 9 February tram lines 5 and 17 were again in operation. However, by 10 February, lines 1, 3, 4, 13, 14, 24 and 25 were still not operating. It took three days to clear ice and snow on all tram lines, the problem being aggravated by road traffic pushing snow back on the rails and refreezing. To help with clearing the rails, the GVB borrowed two preserved work cars and crew from the Electrische Museumtramlijn Amsterdam, a local operating tram museum. One vintage car used was a snow scraper originally from the Wiener Linien (Vienna). A second museum car was a former streetcar modified to carry a tank to sprinkle brine onto the tracks. The two cars were operated by museum staff.

On 14 June 2021, the GVB officially retired its remaining 11G (bidirectional) and 12G (unidirectional) trams manufactured by La Brugeoise et Nivelles (BN). On this day, the GVB donated one tram of each type to the Electrische Museumtramlijn Amsterdam for preservation. These two trams made a symbolic last trip from the Havenstraat depot to the Lekstraat depot. There were still 45 BN trams on hand of which some would be sold at auction with the remainder scrapped. Despite the official retirement, 11G and 12G trams were still spotted in service during the weeks following.

On 13 December 2021, tram line 27 started service between Dijkgraafplein and Surinameplein during the morning rush hours supplementing service on tram line 17.

In 2024, GVB will be working with the Amsterdam regional transport authority (Vervoerregio Amsterdam) to plan the conversion of the Amsterdam tram system from 600 to 750 volts. Such a conversion would use energy more efficiently, reduce energy costs, prevent outages when many trams are in operation and support larger trams in future.

On 21 July 2024, a southward extension of line 25 between Amstelveen Westwijk and Uithoorn Centrum opened. A trip from Uithoorn Centrum (in Uithoorn) to Amsterdam Zuid station is scheduled to take 30 minutes.

Effective 29 March 2026, the GVB made several route changes to the tram network. Tram line 25 (Amsteltram) was extended north-eastwards from Amsterdam Zuid Station to Muiderpoort Station. Line 24 would approach Central Station via Leidseplein instead of Ferdinand Bolstraat. Line 3 was terminated and its route was split among tramlines 7, 24 and 25. Riders will be able to transfer between tramlines 12 and 25 at the De Pijp tram stop. The GVB resurrected line 6 as a rush-hour service between Zuid and Westwijk. According to the GVB, splitting line 3 among lines 12 and 25 would force a transfer for 30 percent of its 15,000 daily riders. Line 12 would serve the busiest portion of line 3 between De Pijp and Kinkerstraat.

On 31 August 2026, the IJtram (line 26) was extended to Strandeiland with three new stops at Centrumeiland, Buiteneilandlaan and Franz Kafkasstraat (new terminus).

== Lines ==
=== Current lines ===
As of January 2026, the Amsterdam tramway network operated the following lines, with long-term diversions described in Notes:

| 1 | Muiderpoort Station – Weesperplein – Leidseplein – Surinameplein – Lelylaan Station – Osdorp De Aker (Matterhorn) | uWSL+l uHST uABZgxl+l uCONTfq CONTgq-; u-CONTgq; lhvSTRq umvSTRq; lhvSTRq; lvINTq CONTfq-; u-CONTfq; lhvSTRq uABZg+l uSTR+r uDST uSTRr uABZgl+xl uexCONTgq ueABZgr uHST; BL2 BLc3 uCONTgq uexKRZlr+lr; uKRZ; BLc1 uCONTf@Fq; KBL4; ulHST uABZg+r KBL2; uHST(L)g uABZgl+l; BLc1; BLc2 uCONTf@Fq; KBL3; KBL4; ulHST; NULfq KBL1; uHST(R)f BLc4 uexKRZlr+lr; uABZg+r uexCONTfq utCONTgq uTBHFt utCONTfq BLc2 KBL2; KBL3; uHST(L)g KBL1; KBL2; uHST(L)gq; MASKll; ulCONTg@Gq uexKRZlr+lr; uKRZ; BLc1; BLc2; BLc3; BLc4 KBL3; KBL4; uHST(R)fq; MASKrr; ulCONTf@Fq BLc1 KBL1; KBL4; uHST(R)f ueABZgl uBHF uABZgl uABZgxr+r KBL3; uHST(L)g KBL1; KBL2; uCONTg@Gq; uKHSTaq uKRZxl; uKRZxr; uKRZ+l; uKRZ; BLc3; BLc4 KBL4; uHST(R)f hCONTgq umKRZh hCONTfq uSTR+l uABZgr+xr uINT-L; lNULg uINT-R uSTRl uCONTf |
| 2 | Central Station – Leidseplein – Hoofddorpplein – Nieuw Sloten (Oudenaardeplantsoen) | uKBHFa uHST uCONTgq uABZgr uBHF(L)g uABZq+lxr; uSTR uCONTfq uBHF(R)f uKRZ+xr; uKRZl; uKRZ uexCONTgq uKRZxl; uKRZ+xl; ueKRZ uexCONTfq uSKRZ-Au uTBHFh umKRZu uWSLgl uWSLr |
| 4 | Central Station – Frederiksplein – Station RAI | utCONTg utBHF-L uKBHFa-R utSTR uHST utSTR; uexCONTg@Gq ueABZgr+r uBHF-R utCONTr+g uSTR uexCONTg@Gq uABZgl+xl uCONTfq BLc2 KBL2; KBL3; uHST(L)g BLc3 KBL1; KBL2; uHST(L)gq; MASKll; ulCONTg@Gq uexKRZlr+lr; uKRZ; BLc1; BLc2; BLc3; BLc4 KBL3; KBL4; uHST(R)fq; MASKrr; ulCONTf@Fq BLc1 KBL1; KBL4; uHST(R)f BLc4 KBL2; KBL3; uHST(R)f KBL1; KBL2; uHST(R)fq; MASKll; ulCONTg@Gq BLc1; BLc2; BLc3; BLc4; uexKRZlr+lr; uKRZ KBL3; KBL4; uHST(L)gq; MASKrr; ulCONTf@Fq KBL1; KBL4; uHST(L)g KBL2; uHST uABZgxl+l; BLc1 KBL4; uKHSTeq; uCONTf@Fq uCONTgq uABZgr umhvSTRq; lvINTq uSTR+l uSTRf uHST(L)g uSTRl uSTRr |
| 5 | Van Hallstraat (Westergasfabriek) – Leidseplein – Museumplein – Station Zuid – A.J Ernstraat – Amstelveen Stadshart | uSTR+l uSTR+r uHST(R)f uSTRg uABZg+l uSTRr uHST BLc2 KBL2; KBL3; uHST(R)f BLc3 KBL1; KBL2; uHST(R)fq; MASKll; ulCONTg@Gq BLc1; BLc2; BLc3; BLc4; uKRZ+xl; uKRZ+xr KBL3; KBL4; uHST(L)gq; MASKrr; ulCONTf@Fq BLc1 KBL1; KBL4; uHST(L)g BLc4 uBHF(L)g uCONTgq uABZgr+r uBHF(R)f uABZgl+l uCONTfq uABZgr uPSLla uSTR; lINT~F uSTR; lINT~G uSKRZ-G4u uKRZu CONTgq umKRZu CONTfq ueHST uSTR+GRZq uhHSTae uTUNNEL2; ulHST uABZgl uKHSTe |
| 6 | Station Zuid – Westwijk (rush hours only) | |
| 7 | Slotermeer (Sloterpark) – Mercatorplein – Leidseplein – Weesperplein – Alexanderplein – Azartplein | uSTR+l uSTR+r uHSTf uSTRg uSTRl uABZg+r BLc2 KBL2; KBL3; uHST(L)g BLc3 KBL1; KBL2; uHST(L)gq; MASKll; ulCONTg@Gq uexKRZlr+lr; uKRZ; BLc1; BLc2; BLc3; BLc4 KBL3; KBL4; uHST(R)fq; MASKrr; ulCONTf@Fq BLc1 KBL1; KBL4; uHST(R)f BLc4 uHST umKRZh uTBHFh uSKRZ-Ao uHST(L)g ueABZgl+l uexCONTfq uHST(R)f KBL2; uHST uCONTgq uexKRZlr+lr; uKRZ; BLc1 KBL4; uKHSTeq; uCONTf@Fq KBL3; uHST(L)g BLc3; BLc4; uABZgxr+r KBL4; uHST(R)f KBL2; KBL3; uHST(R)f KBL1; KBL2; uHST(R)fq; MASKll; ulCONTg@Gq BLc1; BLc2; BLc3; BLc4; uKRZxl; uKRZ+xr KBL3; KBL4; uHST(L)gq; MASKrr; ulCONTf@Fq KBL1; KBL4; uHST(L)g KBL2; uHST(L)g BLc1; BLc2; uABZgl+l KBL1; uHST(R)f uKRZr+r; BLc1; BLc2; BLc3; BLc4 uexKRZlr+lr; uABZg+r uTBHFt ueABZgl uABZgr+xr KBL3; uHST(R)f KBL1; KBL2; uCONTg@Gq; uKHSTaq BLc3; BLc4; uKRZ+r uCONTfq KBL4; uHST(L)g utCONTgq uSTR; utBHFe@fq uWSLl |
| 12 | Central Station – Leidseplein – Museumplein – Ceintuurbaan (De Pijp) – Amstelstation | lINT~F uSTR; lINT~G uHST ueABZgl+l uexCONTfq uCONTgq uABZgr+xr BLc2 KBL2; KBL3; uHST(L)g BLc3 KBL1; KBL2; uHST(L)gq; MASKll; ulCONTg@Gq BLc1; BLc2; BLc3; BLc4; uKRZ+xr; uKRZ+l KBL3; KBL4; uHST(R)fq; MASKrr; ulCONTf@Fq BLc1 KBL1; KBL4; uHST(R)f BLc4 uABZgr uABZgr+r uexCONTgq uexKRZxr; uexKRZ+xr; uSTR KBL3; uHST(R)f KBL1; KBL2; uHST(R)fq; MASKll; ulCONTg@Gq BLc3; BLc4; uABZgr+r KBL4; uHST(L)g uINT uABZgl+xl uCONTfq uABZg+r uSTR+l BLc2; uKRZlr+lr KBL3; uKHSTeq; uCONTf@Fq uKDSTe KBL1; uHST uhbKRZWae mvCONTgq umKRZu-uKRZu mvCONTfq uexvWSLa; uv-SHI2gr d; uINT uSTRg uvWSLe |
| 13 (Note: Line 13 diverts to Zoutkeetsgracht instead of Central Station until January 2027.) | Central Station – Rozengracht (Note: The street Rozengracht is closed for construction until 2027 requiring tramlines 13 and 17 to divert.) – Mercatorplein – Geuzenveld (Lambertus Zijlplein) | uKBHFa uHST ueABZgl+l uexCONTfq uABZgl+xl uCONTfq BLc2 KBL2; KBL3; uHST(R)f BLc3 KBL1; KBL2; uHST(R)fq; MASKll; ulCONTg@Gq BLc1; BLc2; BLc3; BLc4; uKRZ+xr; uKRZl+l KBL3; KBL4; uHST(L)gq; MASKrr; ulCONTf@Fq BLc1 KBL1; KBL4; uHST(L)g BLc4 BLc1; BLc2; BLc3; BLc4; uKRZxl; uKRZ+xl uCONTgq uABZgr+xr KBL3; uHST KBL1; uKHSTaq; uCONTg@Gq uexKRZlr+lr; uKRZ; BLc4 uSKRZ-Au uTBHFh umKRZh KBL2; KBL3; uHST(L)g KBL1; KBL2; uHST(L)gq; MASKll; ulCONTg@Gq uexKRZlr+lr; uKRZ; BLc1; BLc2; BLc3; BLc4 KBL3; KBL4; uHST(R)fq; MASKrr; ulCONTf@Fq KBL1; KBL4; uHST(R)f uWSLr |
| 14 | Central Station – Dam – Plantage – Alexanderplein – Javaplein | utCONTg utBHF-L uKBHFa-R utSTR uHST utSTR; uexCONTg@Gq ueABZgr+r uBHF-R utCONTr+g uSTR uexCONTg@Gq uCONTgq uABZgr+xr uTBHFt ueABZgl+l uexSTR+r uexSTR uexCONTgq uexKRZlr+lr; uSTR uexSTRr uHST(L)g KBL2; uHST(R)fq; MASKll; ulCONTg@Gq BLc2; BLc3; uKRZ+r KBL3; uHST(L)gq; MASKrr; ulCONTf@Fq BLc1 KBL1; KBL4; uHST BLc4 uABZgl+xl uSTR+r BLc2 KBL3; uHST(R)f KBL1; KBL2; uHST(L)gq; MASKll; ulCONTg@Gq BLc3; BLc4; uABZgr+r KBL4; uHST(L)g uHST(R)f umKRZu uSTR+l uSTRg uBHF uSTRl uSTRr uCONTf |
| 17 | Central Station – Rozengracht – Kinkerstraat – Lelylaan Station – Osdorp (Dijkgraafplein) | uKBHFa uHST ueABZgl+l uexCONTfq uABZgl+xl uCONTfq BLc2 KBL3; uHST(R)f KBL1; KBL2; uHST(R)fq; MASKll; ulCONTg@Gq BLc3; BLc4; uABZgr+r BLc1 KBL4; uHST(R)f KBL2; uHST(R)f BLc3 BLc1; BLc2; uABZgl+l KBL3; KBL4; uHST(R)fq; MASKrr; ulCONTf@Fq KBL1; uHST(R)f BLc4 KBL2; KBL3; uHST(R)f BLc1; BLc2; BLc3; BLc4; uKRZxl; uKRZ+xr KBL3; KBL4; uHST(L)gq; MASKrr; ulCONTf@Fq KBL1; KBL4; uHST(L)g KBL3; uHST(L)g KBL1; KBL2; uHST(L)gq; MASKll; ulCONTg@Gq BLc3; BLc4; uABZgr+xr uABZgxl+l uSTR+l uABZgr uDST uSTRl uSKRZ-Ao uCONTgq-; -CONTgq; lhvSTRq mvSTRq; lhvSTRq; lvINTq uCONTfq-; -CONTfq; lhvSTRq uWSLr |
| 19 | Sloterdijk Station – Leidseplein – Weesperplein – Alexanderplein – Watergraafsmeer – Diemen Sniep | uSTR+l uSTR+r uSTRf uBHF uABZgxl+l uSTRr uSKRZ-Au uHST uHST(L)g uexCONTgq ueABZgr+r uHST(R)f uCONTgq uABZgxr+r BLc2 KBL2; KBL3; uHST(R)f BLc3 KBL1; KBL2; uHST(R)fq; MASKll; ulCONTg@Gq BLc1; BLc2; BLc3; BLc4; uKRZxr; uKRZ+xr KBL3; KBL4; uHST(L)gq; MASKrr; ulCONTf@Fq BLc1 KBL1; KBL4; uHST(L)g BLc4 KBL2; uHST(R)f BLc1; BLc2; uABZgl+l KBL1; uHST(L)g KBL3; uHST(L)g KBL1; KBL2; uHST(L)gq; MASKll; ulCONTg@Gq BLc3; BLc4; uABZgr+r KBL4; uHST(R)f KBL2; KBL3; uHST(L)g uKRZr+r; BLc1; BLc2; BLc3; BLc4 KBL3; KBL4; uHST(R)fq; MASKrr; ulCONTf@Fq KBL1; KBL4; uHST(R)f uexKRZlr+lr; uABZg+r uexCONTfq uTBHFt uexKRZlr+lr; uKRZ; BLc1; BLc2; BLc3; BLc4 ueABZgl uABZgr+xr KBL3; KBL4; uKHSTaq; uCONTf@Fq KBL1; uHST uCONTfq BLc1; BLc2; BLc3; BLc4; uKRZxr; uKRZ+xr; uKRZl umKRZu uABZgl+l uENDEeq uSTR; GRZq uABZgl+xl uSTR uABZgl uKDSTe |
| 24 | Central Station – Vijzelstraat – Ferdinand Bolstraat – Stadionweg – Amstelveenseweg – VUmc – De Boelelaan/VU | uCONTg uSTR+l uABZg+r uSTRf uHST uCONTgq uSTRg uSTRl uKRZ; uSTR+r uCONTfq utCONTgq utSTR+r uBHF(R)f utBHF uSTRq; utSTR uABZgr utSTR uABZg+l utSTRl uTINTt utCONTfq uABZgr+r uBHF(L)g uABZgl uSKRZ-G4u uTINTu CONTgq umKRZu CONTfq uWSLl |
| 25 (Note: Line 25 temporarily diverted to Flevopark until 24 September 2026.) | Muiderpoort Station - Station Zuid – Sacharovlaan – Amstelveen Westwijk - Uithoorn Centrum | |
| 26 | Central Station – Rietlandpark – Piet Heintunnel – IJburg – Strandeiland | udKINTa uHST uHST; PORTALf udCONTgq utTBHF udCONTfq utSTRe uSKRZ-G4u uhbKRZWae udSTR2; udHST udSTRc3 d; uvWSLe@F; MASKa; udKHSTe; udSTRc1; dNULf d; udKSTR+4 |
| 27 | Surinameplein – Lelylaan Station – Osdorp (Dijkgraafplein) (morning peak only) | uCONTg uSTR+l uABZgr uDST uHST uSTRl uSKRZ-Ao uCONTgq-; -CONTgq; lhvSTRq mvSTRq; lhvSTRq; lvINTq uCONTfq-; -CONTfq; lhvSTRq uABZgl+xl uCONTfq uWSLr |

=== Former lines ===
The GVB may reassign a line number once used on a former line to a new, unrelated line. For example, in 2020, number 25 was assigned to tram line 25 (Station Zuid – Westwijk) which does not overlap with former line 25 (Centraal Station – President Kennedylaan), closed in 2013.

| 3 | (F. Hendrikplantsoen – Museumplein – Ceintuurbaan (De Pijp) – Muiderpoortstation – Flevopark | Began in 1902 but was split among tramlines 7, 24 and 25 effective 29 March 2026. |
| 6 | Was used multiple times as a temporary rush hour tram service, including at one time to supplement line 5 during the conversion of Metro Line 51 into tram line 25 (Station Zuid – Amstelveen Stadshart). Line 6 was resurrected on 29 March 2026 as a rush hour service between Zuid and Westwijk. | |
| 8 | Centraal Station – Nieuwmarkt – Waterlooplein – Weesperstraat – Rivierenbuurt | Existed from 1905 to 1942. This tram ran through the old Amsterdam Jodenbuurt. The line number will most definitely never be used again since the line was used in the Second World War to transport deported Jews. |
| 9 | Existed from 1903 until 22 July 2018, from Central Station to Diemen Sniep (until 1990 until Watergraafsmeer). This line has for most of its route been replaced by line 19, which instead of Central Station runs to Sloterdijk station, with on its way possibilities to transfer to several metro lines towards Central and South stations. | |
| 10 | Existed from 1900 until 22 July 2018, from Westergasfabriek to Azartplein. This line has for most of its route been replaced by lines 5 and 7. | |
| 11 | First existed between 1904 and 1944 (Central Station – Weesperpoortstation - Muiderpoortstation) and was briefly reassigned to a different route from 1948 to 1955. In 1991 and in between 1996 and 2013 the number was also occasionally used for special routes during events and congresses in the city. From 1993 to 1996 line 11 was also used as a rush hour tram service (Central Station – Leidseplein – Surinameplein) to supplement line 1. This route was reopened on 22 July 2018, but closed again on 23 March 2020 due to declining ridership. | |
| 15 | Existed from 1913 to 1932, and from 1936 to 1937. | |
| 16 | Existed from 1913 until 22 July 2018, from Central Station to VU medical centre. The route was roughly parallel to that of line 24 and the newly opened metro 52, which is why this tram line was closed. | |
| 18 | Existed from 1913 to 1951 under two different routes. | |
| 20 | Existed from 1922 to 1932, from 1991 to 1993 (branch line), and as a Circle Tram from 1997 to 2002. During the entire period, there were successively three different tram lines with this number. | |
| 21 | Existed as a horse/tractor tram line (ex municipality of Sloten) from 1921 to 1925 and as an electric tramway from 1928 to 1931. | |
| 22 | Existed from 1921 to 1944 (Circle Line Central Station). | |
| 23 | Existed from 1921 to 1944 (Stadium transport to 1958). | |
| S | Was a tram service in use in 1948 and 1949 to transport passengers between Central Station and the Amstelstation to make the Amstelstation more accessible after the war. This line did not have its own color and just displayed the letter S. | |

=== Other numbers ===
| 28 | Number 28 has never been used for a tram line in Amsterdam. | |
| 29 | Number 29 has also not been used, but both numbers have their own colors so that they may be used in the future. | |
| 30 | Haarlemmermeerstation – Amstelveen – Bovenkerk | Number 30 is used informally by the Electrische Museumtramlijn Amsterdam. |

=== Line colours ===
Upon the electrification of the Amsterdam tramway network, all tram lines were given a line number and a line colour. The latter designator is a square logo next to the line number, so that people who cannot read the line numbers can still recognise the line. The tram stop signs also display the line colours, as did the early twentieth century horse tram lines. Line colours have been used in other cities in the Netherlands (The Hague, Rotterdam, Utrecht), but outside Amsterdam the colours have since been removed.

The Amsterdam line colours consist of combinations of one or two colours (red, green, yellow, blue and white). Not all colour combinations are permitted: for example, green-blue and yellow-white are not used, due to the lack of contrast. The square plane can be split horizontally, vertically or diagonally.

The belt lines 3, 7, 9 and 10 were given a line colour in one colour: yellow, blue, green and red, respectively. The radial lines usually had line colours divided into two. Later, new line colours divided into three fields (using a total of two colours) were introduced. Lines 7 and 13 have different combinations again. Line 7 is blue, but for clarity two horizontal white stripes are added. Line 13 is white, but has a pattern of blue squares added. Line 22 (originally 19) (Circle Line Centraal Station) was the only line using the colour pink.

Under the current system, there are 38 colour combinations. In the 1980s, unused combinations were assigned to the nonexistent lines 27, 28, 29 and 30 and to the metro line numbers 50 and 58. Today, the line colours are still used. They are located next to the line number on the front of the trams and light rail vehicles (and also on light rail vehicles running on metro lines 50, 51, 53 and 54).

== Headquarters and depots ==
The AOM's original headquarters was located at Stadhouderskade 2. In 1923, the GTA set up a new headquarters in the Amsterdam School style building at the corner of the Overtoom and Stadhouderskade 1. In 1983, the GVB moved to Scheepvaarthuis (also in Amsterdam School style; completed 1913) at Prins Hendrikkade 108. In 2004, the GVB moved again, to a modern office building at Arlandaweg 100, near Sloterdijk station.

For the operation of Amsterdam's trams, there are two main depots: Havenstraat (Oud-Zuid), which was opened in 1914, and Lekstraat (Rivierenbuurt), built between 1927 and 1929 in Amsterdam School style. On 12 July 2010, the management of the two depots was merged. Lekstraat depot is now only used for storage, and the daily maintenance of all trams is now carried out at the Havenstraat depot. The Lekstraat depot is classified as a state monument (rijksmonument) with restrictions on materials that may be used for renovations.

Line 26 uses the IJburgstalling, a tram storage yard on Zeeburgereiland in the IJburg district of Amsterdam. Located along tram line 26 near the Bob Haarmslaan stop, the yard was built especially for line 26, partly because of lack of space in the Lekstraat depot, and partly to shorten turnaround times. The yard opened in May 2005, and was reopened on 28 September 2020 after a renovation to handle coupled pairs of trams and to increase its capacity from 18 to 32 trams.

Line 25 uses the Legmeerpolder tram storage yard located south of the Westwijk tram stop, the line 25 terminal in Amstelveen. Opened in August 2020, the yard has capacity for 36 trams.

Since 1996, the main Amsterdam tram workshop has been in Diemen-Zuid. It is connected to the network by a kilometre of single track from the Diemen Sniep terminus of line 19. Previously, it had been housed from 1902 in Tollensstraat (Oud-West).

== Rolling stock ==
| Image | Series | Capacity sit/stand | Length | Width | Weight | Number built (in service) | Delivered | In operation |
|---|---|---|---|---|---|---|---|---|
| | Series 11G built by BN; 901-920 bidirectional trams officially retired 14 June 2021 | 52/76 | 25.9 m (84 ft 11 5/8 in) | 2.35 m (7 ft 8 1/2 in) | 38 tonnes | 20 (0) | 1989–1990 | 1990–2021 |
| | Series 12G built by BN; 817-841 all retired by 2 January 2021 | 51/90 | 25.9 m (84 ft 11 5/8 in) | 2.35 m (7 ft 8 1/2 in) | 38 tonnes | 25 (0) | 1990–1991 | 1991–2021 |
| | Series 13G Siemens Combino; C1: 2001–2130, 2145–2151; C1A: 2131-2144 (with ATB for the Piet Heintunnel) | 55/76 | 29.2 m (95 ft 9 5/8 in) | 2.4 m (7 ft 10 1/2 in) | 36 tons | 151 (151) | 2001–2005 | 2002–present |
| | Series 14G Siemens Combino bidirectional trams C2A: 2201–2204 | 52/99 | 29.2 m (95 ft 9 5/8 in) | 2.4 m (7 ft 10 1/2 in) | 36 tons | 4 (3) | 2002 | 2002–present |
| | Series 15G CAF Urbos 100 bidirectional trams R-net livery: 3001-3025 blue-white livery: 3026-3063 | 50/125 | 30 m (98 ft 5 1/8 in) | 2.4 m (7 ft 10 1/2 in) | 39 tonnes | 72 (72) | 2019–2022 | 2020–present |

In 2026, the GVB requested tenders for 75 new trams to replace its older Combino vehicles delivered as early as 2002 which were becoming less reliable and more difficult to maintain as they approach the end of their service life. The contract is expected to be signed in 2027 with the new trams going into service starting in 2032. There is a life extension plan for the Combino fleet.

=== 15G trams ===
The 15G trams were needed to replace the 30-year old 11G and 12G trams. The trams have couplers to operate on the Amsteltram and IJtram lines (numbered 25 and 26 respectively), and be bidirectional and low-floor. The materials in the new trams were expected to be 92 percent recyclable.

==== Development ====
On 11 November 2016, GVB contracted with the Spanish manufacturer Construcciones y Auxiliar de Ferrocarriles (CAF) to build and deliver 63 new trams with an option for 60 more. In July and August 2017, a full-size mockup of the new tram was displayed at the Lekstraat depot to solicit comments from the public. At the end of 2018, CAF built the first tram and began testing it on its own 350-metre test track. A tram simulator was installed at the Havenstraat depot in order to tram 300 GVB operators. At 02:45 on the morning of 26 April, the first 15G tram arrived at the Diemen workshop. To satisfy legal requirements, there had to be 3 phases of testing: 1) operating around the Diemen workshop grounds, 2) on the tram network when no other trams were running and 3) between other trams on the network. Winter testing was done at a facility in Minden, Germany. On 13 July 2020, a permit was issued to commission the 15G. On the night of 28/29 May 2019, the 15G made its first test trip over the tram network. Nightly sound tests were performed between 29 July and 15 August. Starting 19 September, carrying sand bags, the tram made test runs on the tram network while other trams were in regular service. In May 2020, the GVB ordered 9 additional trams from CAF, with all 72 trams to cost 209.1 million euros. In 2020, despite a COVID-19 lockdown for several months of all non-essential businesses in Spain, CAF put in extra effort to deliver the last 15G on schedule. Between 30 November and 12 December 2020, there were training runs using coupled 15G trams. On 13 December 2020, coupled pairs of 15G trams went into service on the Amstelveen line (a.k.a. Amsteltram, line 25); these trams were in R-net livery. At the end of March 2021, 15G trams appeared in the blue and white GVB livery. The 72nd 15G tram was received on 11 April 2022.

The GVB still has the option to purchase 53 more 15G trams from CAF. The extension of the IJtram (line 26) between Centrumeiland en Strandeiland will require 13 extra trams, and a new tram line between Station Sloterdijk and Zuid railway stations (along bus line 15) will be require 11 more.

==== Problems ====
On 18 August 2020, there were complaints of screeching wheels when a 15G tram went around the Azartplein turning loop. To solve the problem, the GVB implemented a GPS-controlled greasing mechanism mounted on the tram to apply a thin layer of oil to the wheels.

There was a partial derailment soon after the 15G trams went into service. Trams were not communicating properly with the switch systems. Initially, on-site maintenance staff were required to correct the problem. Until there was a permanent solution, track-side control boxes were installed so that tram operators could step outside and insert a key in the box to set switches and signals.

In October 2021, there were complaints that the extendable wheelchair ramp was too slanted, too short or had a kink in it. This rendered the ramp unusable for certain wheelchair types, and required assistance. However, the trams had no conductor on board to assist. As of May 2022, the GVB was awaiting a solution from the manufacturer.

== See also ==
- Amsterdam Metro
- Transport in Amsterdam
- List of town tramway systems in the Netherlands
- History of Amsterdam
