= Onderuit tram stop =

Tram station in Amstelveen, Netherlands

Onderuit
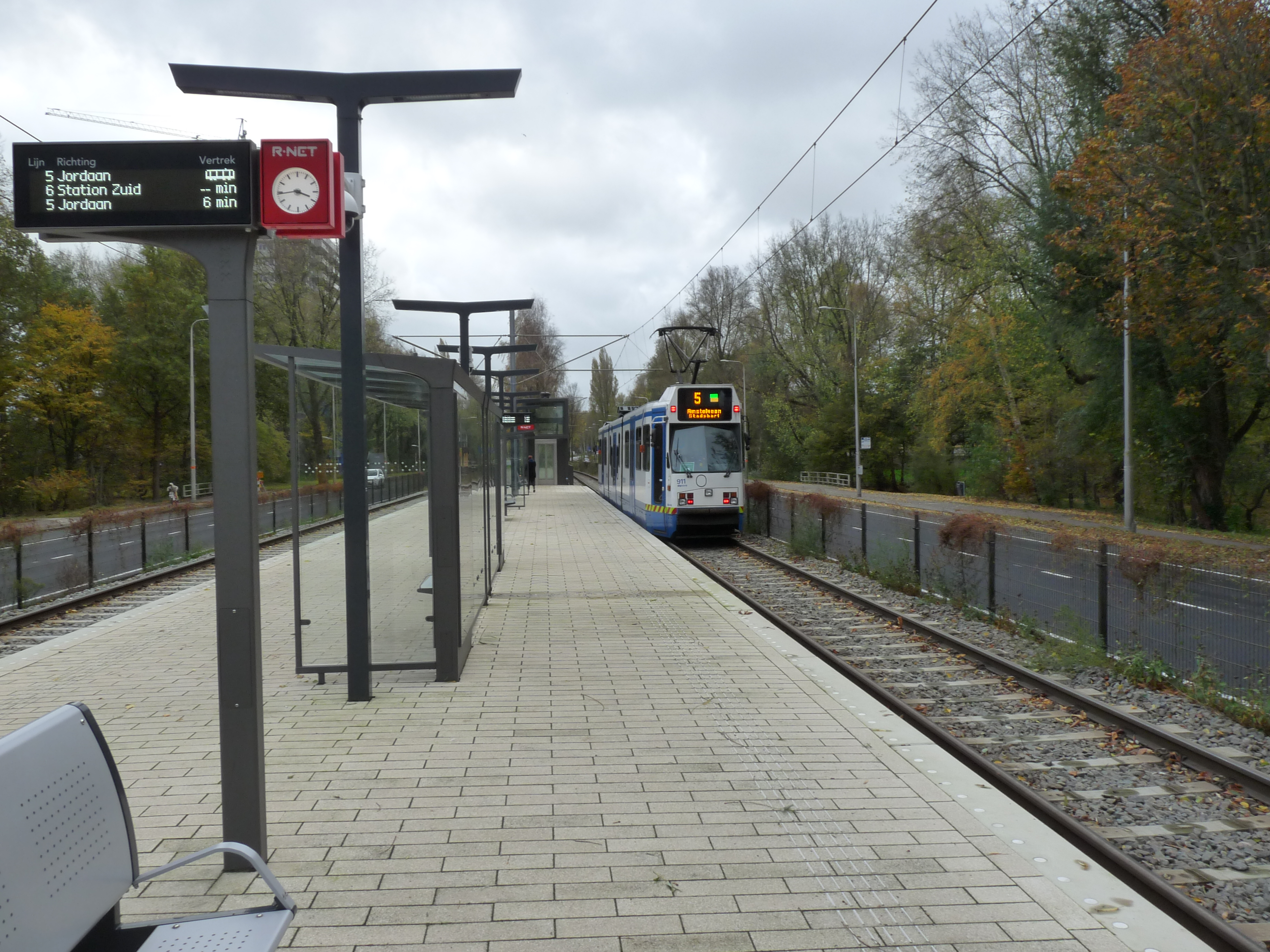
- Line 5 tram at Onderuit after stop rebuilt

General information
- Location: Beneluxbaan & Onderuit, Amstelveen; Netherlands
- Coordinates: 52°18′29.3″N 4°52′21.1″E
- Platforms: 1 centre platform
- Tracks: 2

Other information
- Website: GVB: Onderuit

History
- Rebuilt: 2019–2020

Services
Preceding station	Amsterdam Tram	Following station
Zonnestein towards Westergasfabriek	Line 5	Oranjebaan towards Stadshart
Zonnestein towards Station Zuid	Line 25	Oranjebaan towards Uithoorn Centrum

Former services
Preceding station	Amsterdam Metro	Following station
Zonnestein towards Centraal Station	Line 51	Oranjebaan towards Westwijk
Location
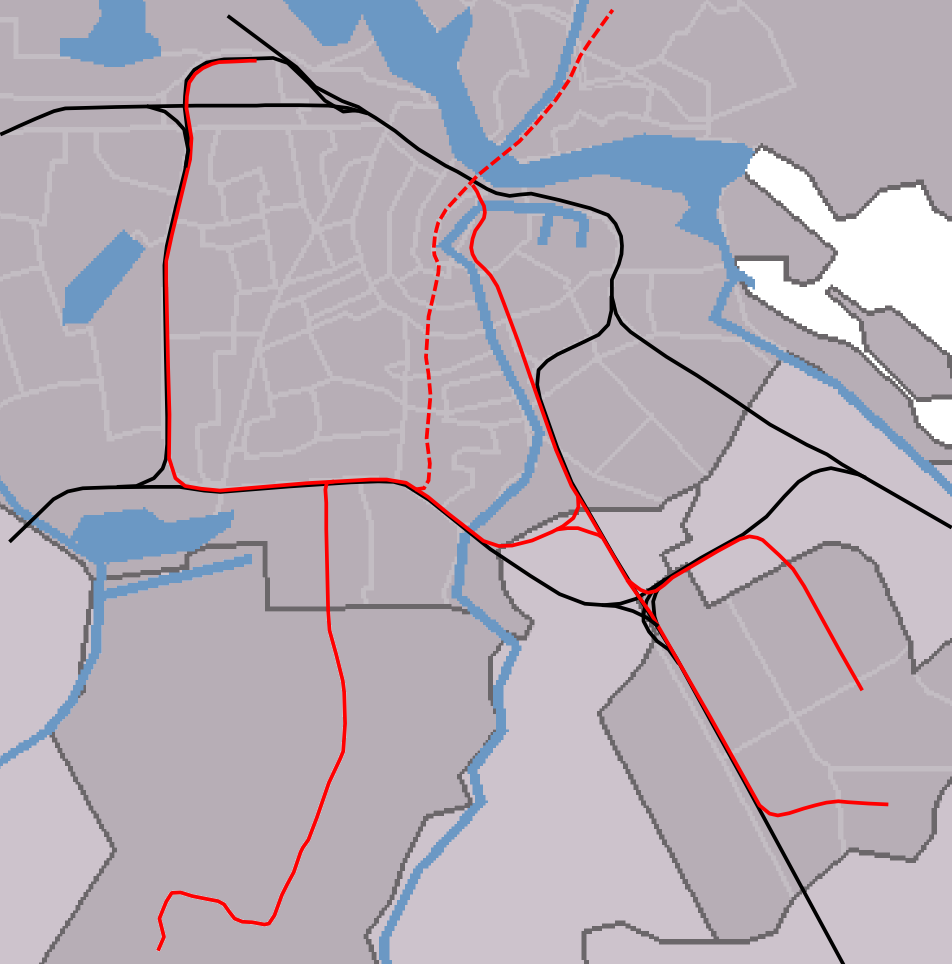
- Location within metro van Amsterdam

Onderuit is a tram stop within the city of Amstelveen, Netherlands. The stop serves tram lines 5 and 25. Line 25, dubbed the Amsteltram before receiving its line number, opened officially on 13 December 2020, unofficially 4 days earlier on 9 December.

Before being rebuilt in 2019 and 2020, the stop used to serve both the low-floor trams of tram line 5 plus the high-floor trams of metro line 51, a hybrid metro/sneltram (light rail) service that opened in 1990. Both lines 5 and 51 shared the same pair of tracks but used separate, adjacent platforms. There were a pair of low-level platforms for line 5 and a separate pair of high-level platforms for line 51, with stairs connecting the two platform levels. In 2019, metro line 51 service south of Amsterdam Zuid station was terminated to rebuild stations to accommodate only the low-floor trams of lines 5 and 25; the high-level platforms were demolished, and the low-level platforms were lengthened to handle a coupled pair of low-floor trams.

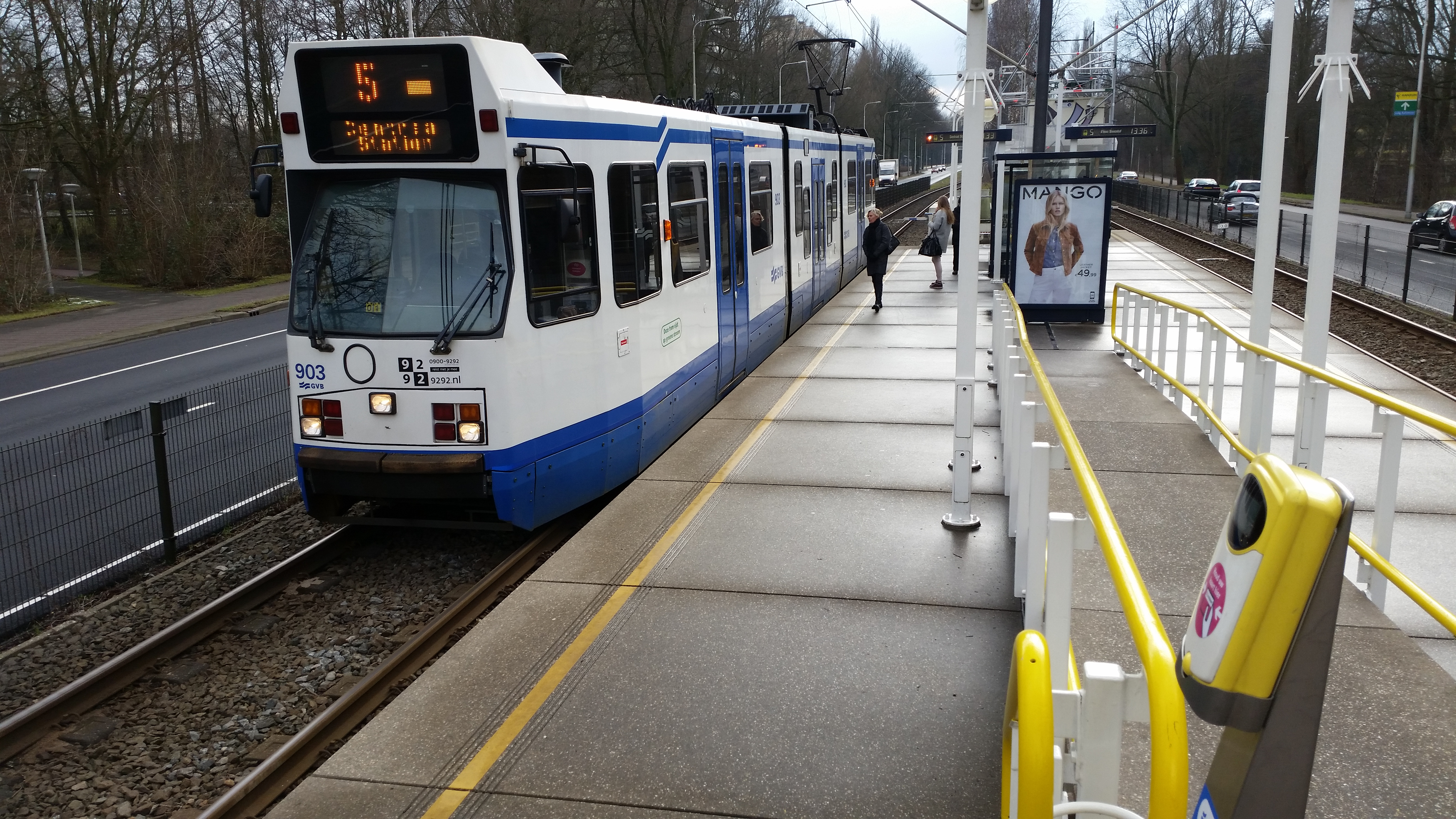
Line 5 tram at Onderuit before stop rebuilt
