= Amsterdam tram line 24 =

Tramline in Amsterdam

Tramlijn 24 (Amsterdam)
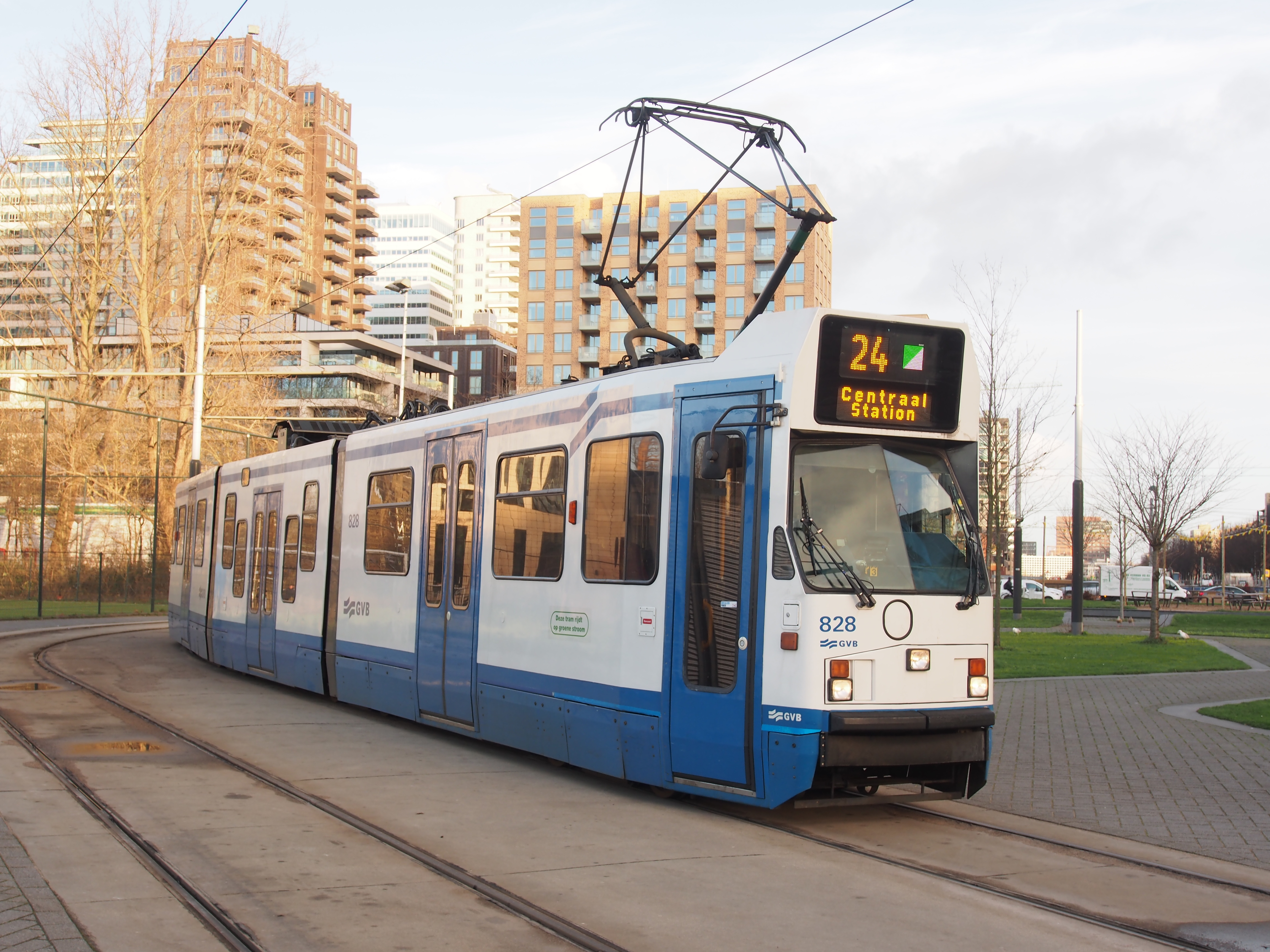

Overview
- Locale: Amsterdam
- Termini: Frederiksplein; Vrije Universiteit
- Stations: 15
- Website: GVB Lijn 24

Service
- Route number: 24
- Operator: Gemeente Vervoerbedrijf (GVB)

History
- Opened: 17 October 1929

Technical
- Line length: 6 Km
- Number of tracks: 2
- Track gauge: 1,435 mm (4 ft 8 1/2 in)
- Electrification: 600 V DC overhead

Line 24 is a GVB run tram between the edge of the center of Amsterdam and the northwestern part of Buitenveldert. The starting and ending points are Frederiksplein and the Vrije Universiteit on De Boelelaan.

== History of the line ==
The Amsterdam tram line 24 was established on October 17, 1929, and operated the route from the Central Station via Damrak – Dam – Rokin – Vijzelstraat – Ferdinand Bolstraat – Ceintuurbaan – Roelof Hartstraat – Joh. M. Coenenstraat – Beethovenstraat – Stadionweg, where a loop was driven through Turnerstraat and Olympiaweg to a stand at Stadionplein. However, trams leaving the Havenstraat depot were stationed on Stadionweg at the reserve stop and therefore did not drive through the loop. Furthermore, until 1975 there was a separate stadium loop on Stadionplein for the installation of extra trams during matches.

In the early years, the Stadionweg was still undeveloped and a single vehicle sufficed. However, from the 1930s the line, together with line 25, grew into a much busier line.

In 1965 there was a plan for an extension via the Parnassusweg and Buitenveldertselaan to Buitenveldert, but due to the emerging metro plans, this plan did not go ahead. 17 new double-articulated trams (653–669) had already been ordered for the extension. These were put into service in 1964 and were then used to replace old two-axle vehicles.

This route remained in use unchanged for 73 years. This makes line 24 the tram line whose route remained unchanged for the longest time, until May 6, 2003. The line then detoured from Ferdinand Bolstraat via Albert Cuypstraat – Ruysdaelstraat – Gabriël Metsustraat – Van Baerlestraat – Joh. M. Coenenstraat and beyond, due to the start of work on the north–south metro line in Ferdinand Bolstraat. The diversion was supposed to take a year and a half but ultimately took thirteen years. The old route was only restored in 2017, when the tracks in this part of Ferdinand Bolstraat came back into use. From 2003 to 2016, line 24 in Amsterdam-Zuid had a winding route.

On December 10, 2006, line 24 left the loop via the Olympiaweg after more than 77 years and was extended via the extension, which was already in use by line 16 in 2003, via the Amstelveenseweg and De Boelelaan to the VU medical center on Gustav Mahlerlaan. As a result, lines 16 and 24 now had the same endpoints, but different routes between Museumplein and Stadionplein.

As of 2012, a new building was built at the location of the turning loop of tram lines 16 and 24 as part of the Zuidas. That is why this turning loop was replaced on October 31, 2011, by a loop directly northwest of the intersection of Buitenveldertselaan / De Boelelaan, right in front of the main entrance of the Vrije Universiteit. Although tram line 5 and metro/express tram line 51 (later tram line 25) on the Parnassusweg run close to this terminus, there is no direct rail connection.

== Temporary Suspension ==
From May 11, 2016, until April 18, 2017, line 24 was temporarily closed. The reason for the closure was that the connecting arches at the Concertgebouw between Van Baerlestraat and Gabriël Metsustraat, which were constructed in 2000 as temporary diversion arches for line 24, were worn out. This meant that Stadionweg lost its tram connection for 11 months. The tracks were only used for depot runs of line 5. According to the plans, the original route (until 2003) via the Ferdinand Bolstraat between Ceintuurbaan and Albert Cuypstraat became available again after the end of the work on April 18, 2017, and the line returned, after which line 16 was temporarily canceled due to other work. With the arrival of metro line 52 on July 22, 2018, in addition to the cancellation of line 16, the frequency on line 24 was also reduced to 6 times per hour, except on Saturday afternoon.

== Future relocation of south end point ==
If the Zuidasdok project were to be carried out according to the original planning, the southern terminus of line 24 would be moved to the new tram station of Station Zuid around 2031.

== Line 24R ==
Between December 20, 1932, and October 9, 1944, there was a short route service 24R (Rembrandtplein) that, coming from the South, ended at Rembrandtplein (via the Reguliersbreestraat / Reguliersdwarsstraat loop).
