= Dijkgraafplein =

Square in Amsterdam, Netherlands

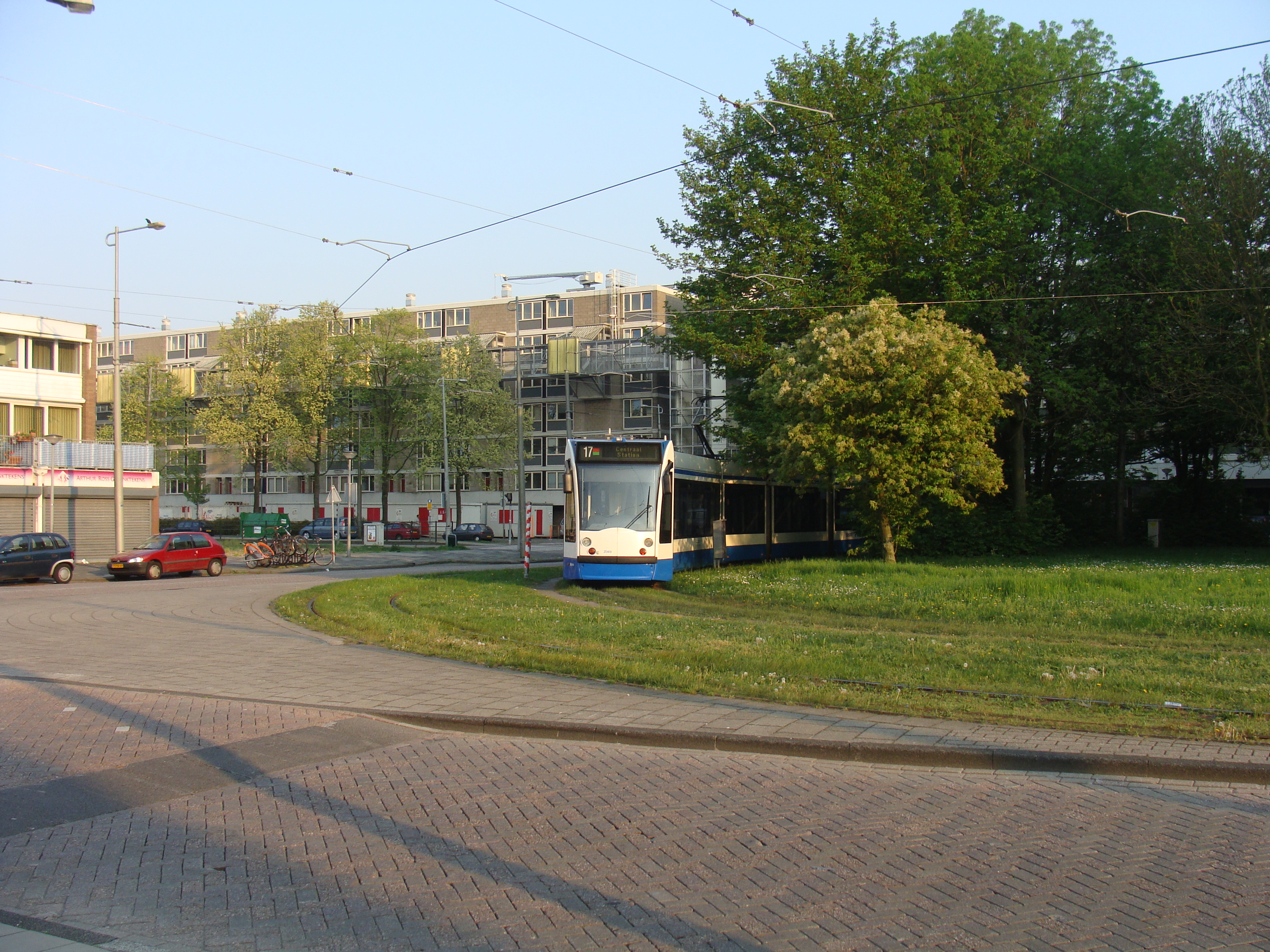
- Dijkgraafplein in 2011

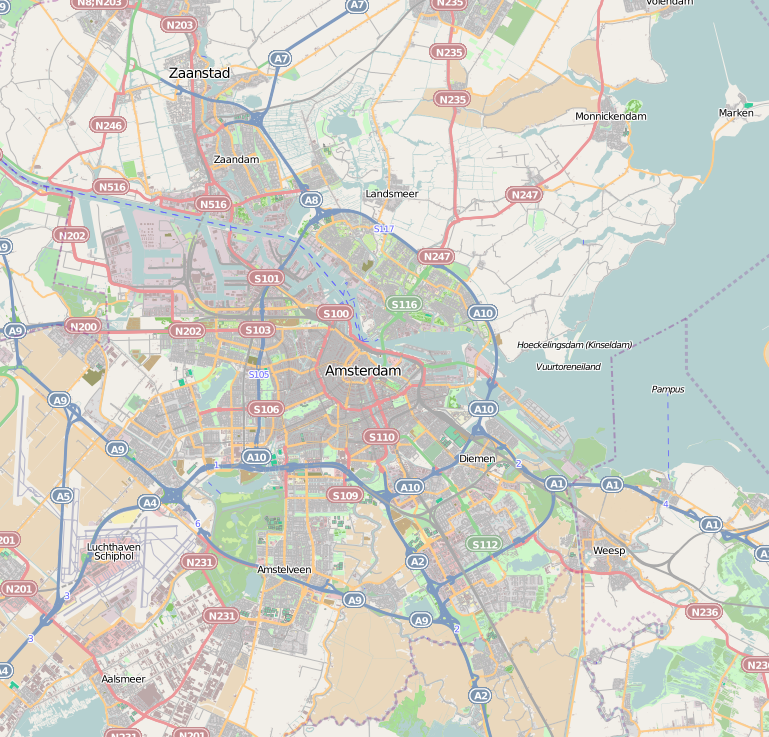
- Location within Greater Amsterdam
- Namesake: Dijkgraaf
- Location: Nieuw-West, Amsterdam, Netherlands
- Nearest metro station: Lelylaan
- Coordinates: 52.3556°N 4.7860°E

The Dijkgraafplein is a square in Amsterdam-Osdorp in the Netherlands, lying at the end of Tussen Meer. The square is named after the office of dijkgraaf (the chairman of a water board) in 1962. The Dijkgraafplein lies in the neighborhood that is now known as 'De Punt' and where many streets are named after waterways.

Since 1962 tram line 17 terminates on this square. From 1971 tram line 1 also began here. In 2001, line 1 began running via a new tram track to De Aker and line 17 was again extended to the Dijkgraafplein, just as between 1962 and 1971.
