= Mantler =

Mantler is a surname. Notable people with the surname include:

- Karen Mantler (born 1966), American jazz pianist, singer, and composer
- Lisa and Lena Mantler (born 2002), German social media personalities
- Michael Mantler (born 1943), Austrian avant-garde jazz trumpeter and composer
- Theodor Mantler (1893-1970), Austrian football goalkeeper and referee

== See also ==
- Mantle (surname)
