= Mantle =

A mantle is a piece of clothing, a type of cloak. Several other meanings are derived from that.

Mantle may refer to:

- Mantle (clothing), a cloak-like garment worn mainly by women as fashionable outerwear
  - Mantle (vesture), an Eastern Orthodox vesture worn by monastics and higher clergy
  - Mantle (royal garment), a garment worn by monarchs and princes as a symbol of authority
  - Mantle (heraldry), a heraldic element
- Mantle (geology), a layer in the interior of a planet
  - The Earth's mantle
- Mantle (surname)
- Mantle, a feature of bird anatomy
- Mantle (climbing), the external covering of a climbing rope.
- Mantle, a black and white dog coat colour, especially in Great Danes
- Mantle (mollusc), a layer of tissue in molluscs which secretes the shell
- Fireplace mantle or mantel, the hood over the grate of a fire
- Gas mantle, a device for generating bright white light when heated by a flame
- Mantle Site, in Whitchurch-Stouffville, near Toronto
- Mantle (API), a low-level GPU API developed by AMD

== Entertainment ==
- The Mantle, an album by Agalloch
- Greenmantle, a novel by John Buchan

== See also ==
- Mantel (disambiguation)
- Mantell (disambiguation)
- Mantling, heraldry drapery that is tied to the helmet above the shield
