= Inauguration of Beatrix =

Inauguration of Queen Beatrix of the Netherlands

Coordinates: 52.3739°N 4.8918°E

Inauguration of Queen Beatrix
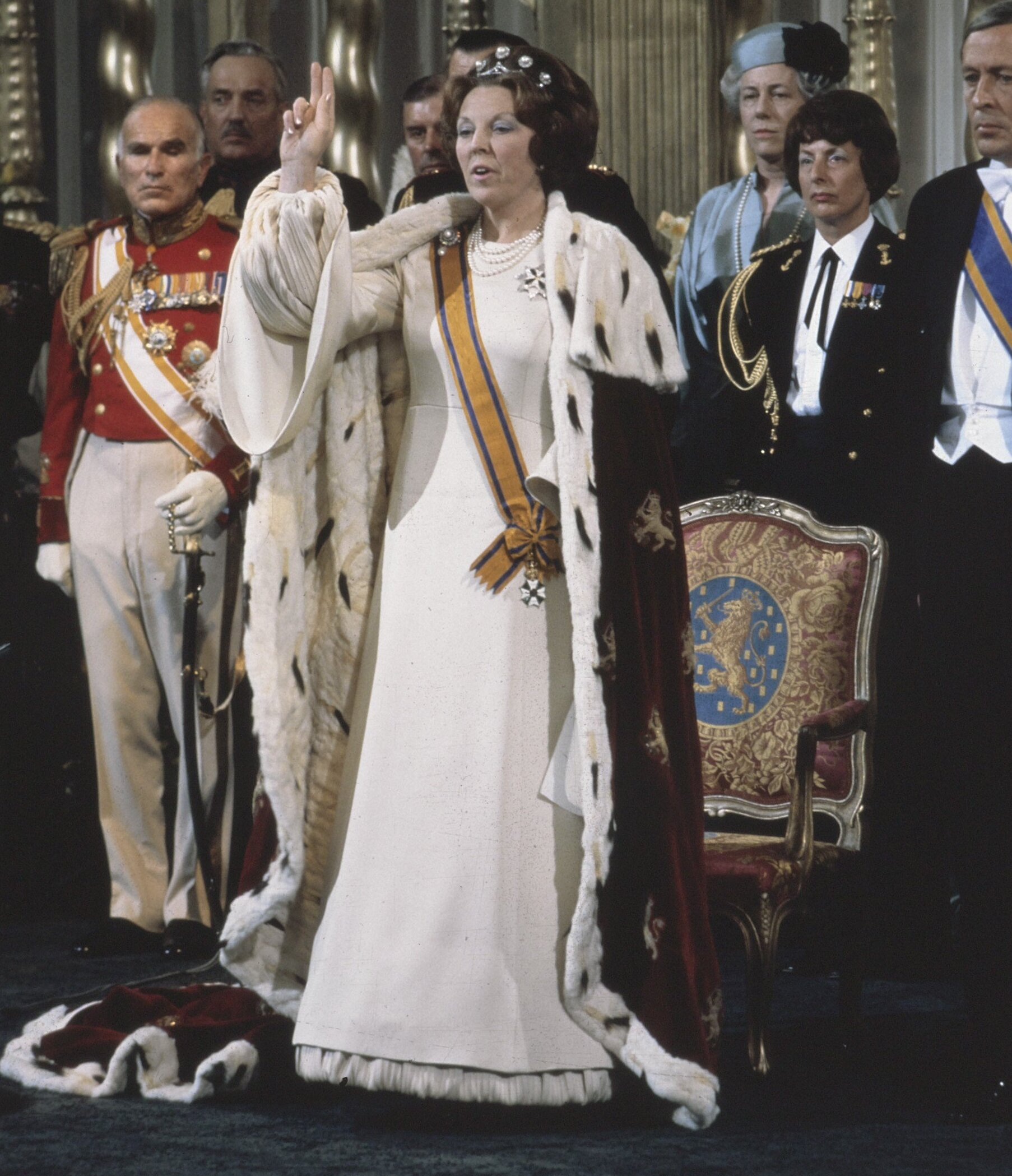
- Queen Beatrix taking the oath
- Date: 30 April 1980
- Location: Amsterdam, Netherlands
- Participants: Queen Beatrix; States General; Dutch Armed Forces; King of Arms; Officer of Arms

The inauguration of Beatrix as Queen of the Netherlands took place on 30 April 1980 at the Nieuwe Kerk in Amsterdam. Beatrix ascended the throne immediately following the abdication of her mother Juliana earlier that day.

Celebrations were largely marred by riots, known as the Amsterdam coronation riots.

== Background ==
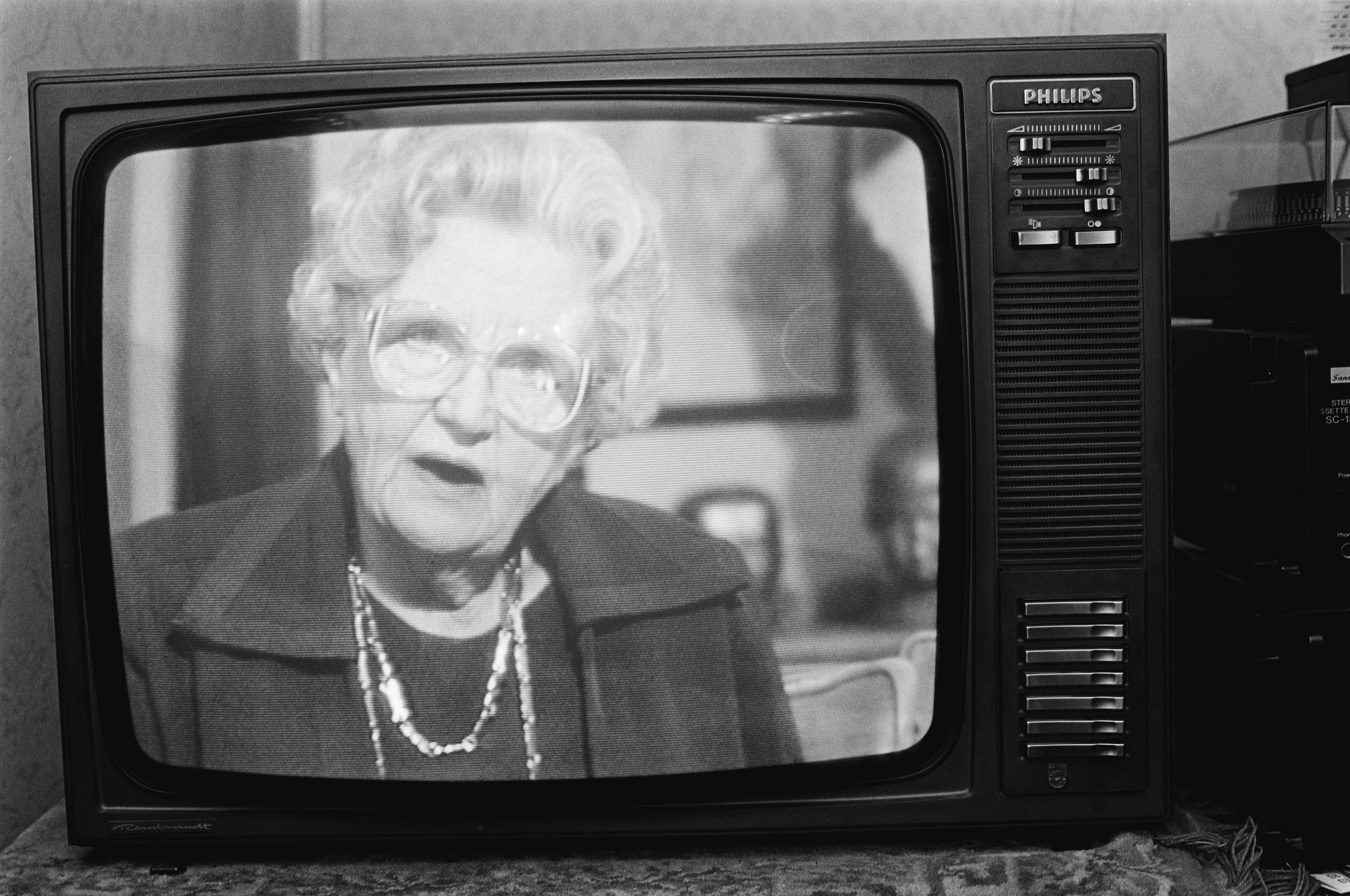
Queen Juliana accouncing her intent to abdicate

Following a reign of 31 years which began with the abdication of her mother Queen Wilhelmina in 1948, Queen Juliana, in a television and radio address to the nation on 31 January 1980, announced her intent to abdicate the throne in favour of her eldest daughter, Beatrix, in accordance with the precedence set by her mother.

== Abdication ==
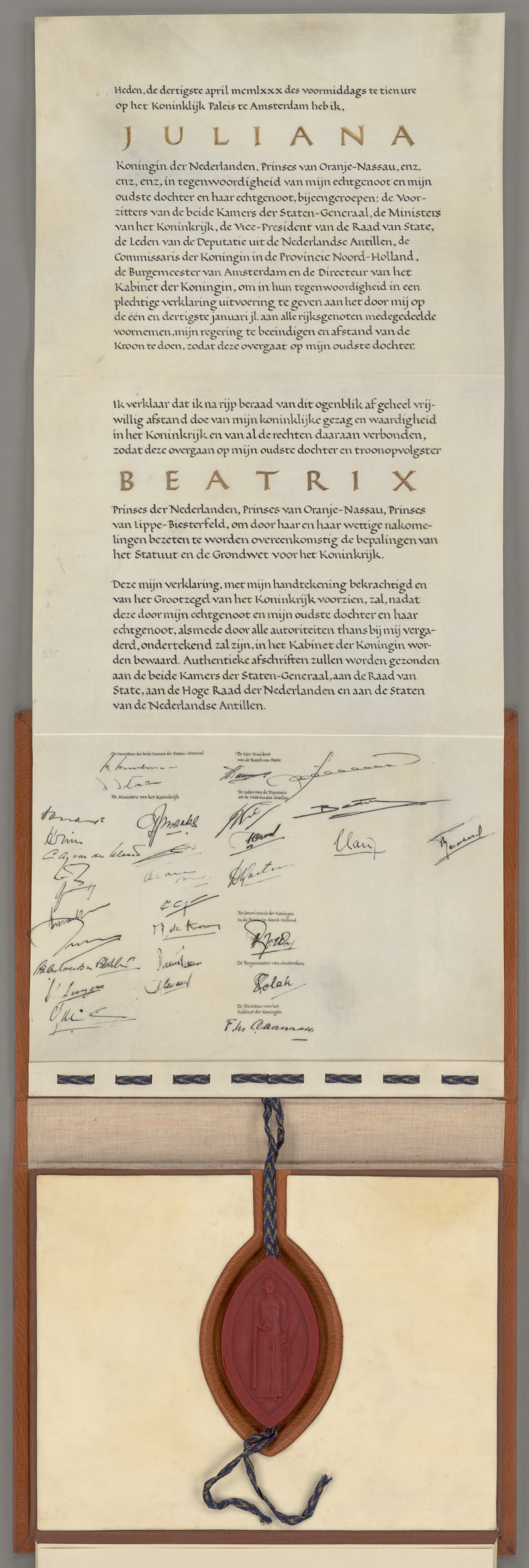
The instrument of abdication

At 10:06 AM CEST on 30 April 1980, her 71st birthday, Queen Juliana signed the instrument of abdication in the Royal Palace of Amsterdam. Juliana thus relinquished the Dutch throne and all its associated titles and styles. She reverted to her pre-accession martial titles "Princess of the Netherlands, Princess of Orange-Nassau, Duchess of Mecklenburg, Princess of Lippe-Biesterfeld" with the style of Royal Highness.

Afterward, Queen Beatrix, Prince Claus, Princess Juliana and Prince Bernhard appeared on the palace balcony. The outgoing and incoming queens both made speeches. Princess Juliana and Prince Bernhard left the balcony, making way for the new Queen's three sons, Prince Willem-Alexander, Prince Johan-Friso and Prince Constantijn, to symbolise the transition of the Royal House.

== Inauguration ==
=== Procession ===
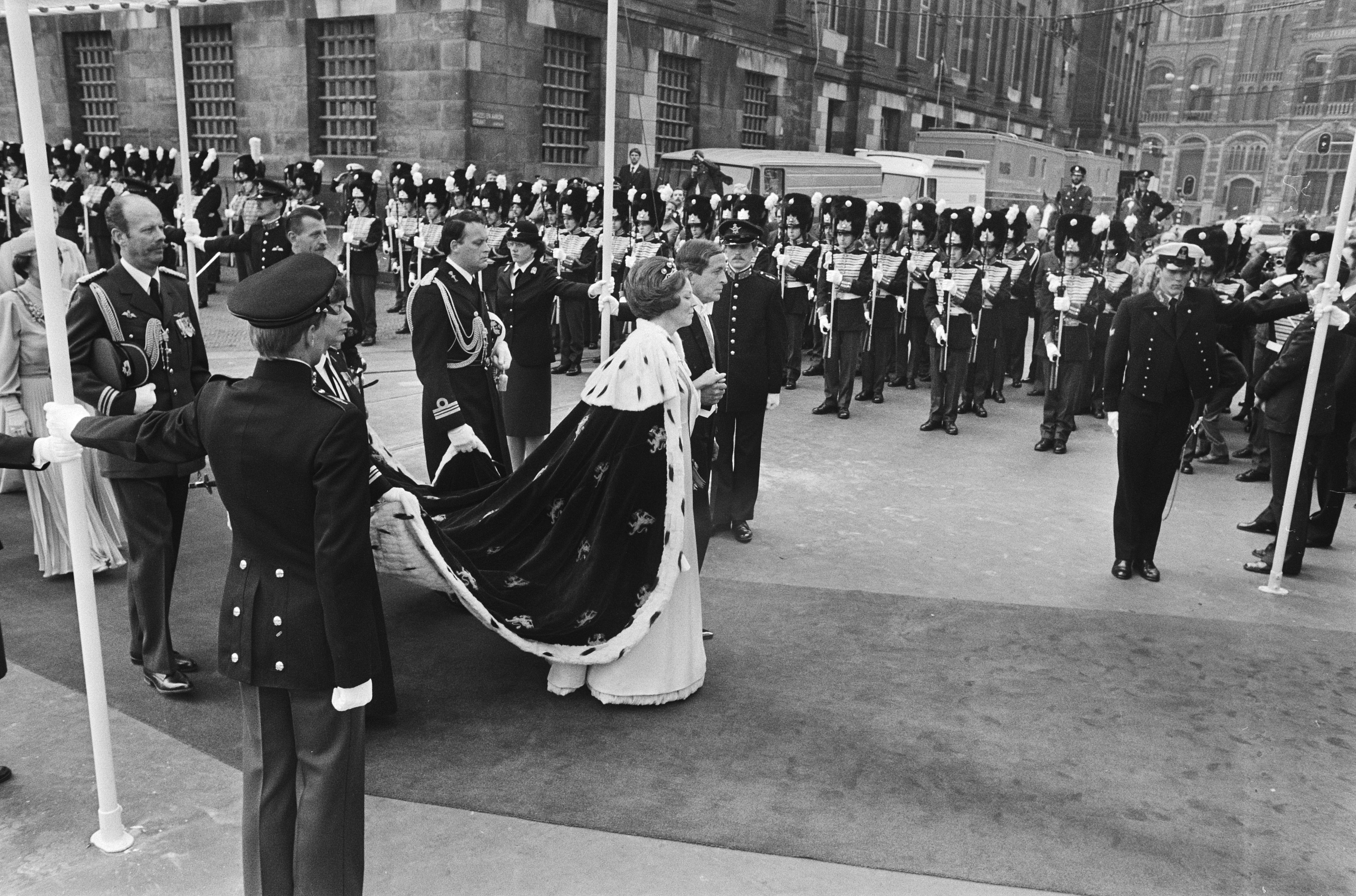
Queen Beatrix and Prince Claus process to the Nieuwe Kerk

En route from the Royal Palace to the Nieuwe Kerk, the Queen was led by a delegation of aids carrying both the Charter and Constitution which were placed on the credence table in front of the throne. The delegation consisted of two kings of arms, the senior one being Erik Hazelhoff Roelfzema, a member of the resistance and officers of arms. Then came the Sword of state and the gonfalon of state, a white banner bearing the 1815 coat of arms of the Netherlands symbolizing the Kingdom of the Netherlands.

=== Ceremony ===
Beatrix was inaugurated as queen of the Netherlands in a solemn session of the States General of the Netherlands in the Nieuwe Kerk. During the ceremony, she took his oath of office and swore to uphold the Charter for the Kingdom of the Netherlands and the Constitution of the Netherlands. Following Beatrix's swearing-in, members of the States General swore allegiance.

Queen Beatrix was not physically crowned, but the regalia of the Netherlands was displayed during the ceremony.

=== Attire ===
Queen Beatrix wore a gown by Dutch designer Theresia Vreugdenhil under the Koningsmantel. She wore the Pearl Button Tiara and the riband and star of the Military Order of William.

=== Guests ===
==== Dutch Royal Family ====
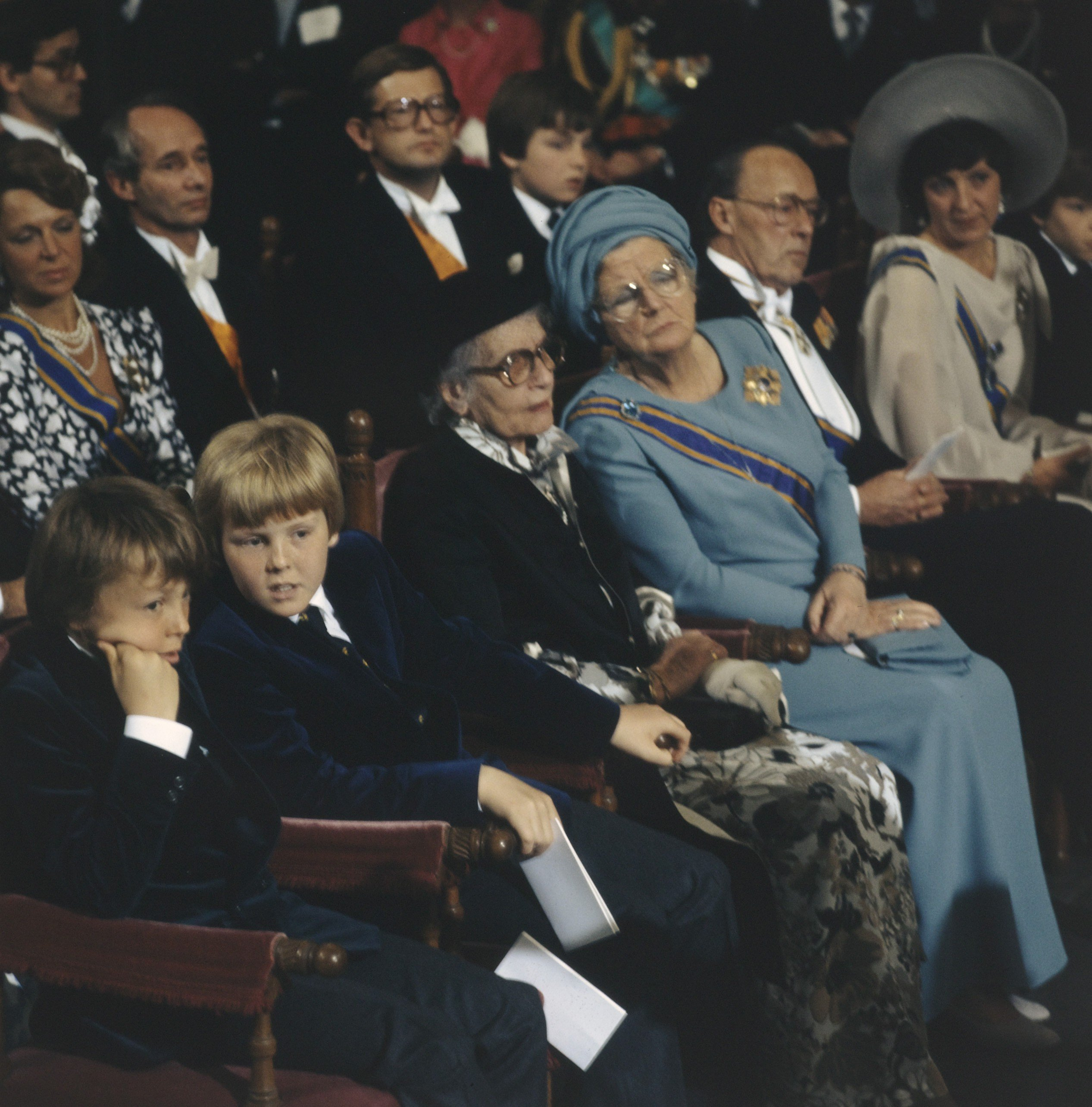
Prince Johan Friso, the Prince of Orange, Baroness Gösta von Amsberg, Princess Juliana, Prince Bernhard and Princess Margriet during the ceremony

- Princess Juliana and Prince Bernhard, the Queen's parents
  - Prince Claus, the Queen's husband
    - The Prince of Orange, the Queen's son
    - Prince Johan Friso, the Queen's son
    - Prince Constantijn, the Queen's son
  - The Duchess and Duke of Parma and Piacenza, the Queen's sister and brother-in-law
  - Princess Margriet and Prof. Pieter van Vollenhoven, the Queen's sister and brother-in-law
    - Prince Maurits of Orange-Nassau, van Vollenhoven, the Queen's nephew
    - Prince Bernhard of Orange-Nassau, van Vollenhoven, the Queen's nephew
    - Prince Pieter-Christiaan of Orange-Nassau, van Vollenhoven, the Queen's nephew
  - Princess Christina and Mr Jorge Pérez y Guillermo, the Queen's sister and brother-in-law

==== Von Amsberg Family ====
- Baroness Gösta von Amsberg, Prince Claus' mother

==== Foreign Royal ====
- (Belgium) The Prince and Princess of Liège (representing the King of the Belgians)
- The Princess and Prince of Sayn-Wittgenstein-Berleburg (representing the Queen of Denmark)
- The Prince and Princess Mikasa (representing the Emperor of Japan)
- The Hereditary Grand Duke of Luxembourg (representing Grand Duke of Luxembourg)
- The Crown Prince of Morocco (representing the King of Morocco)
- The Crown Prince and Crown Princess of Norway (representing the King of Norway)
- The Duchess and Duke of Badajoz (representing the King of Spain)
- Princess Christina, Mrs Magnuson, and Mr Tord Magnuson (representing the King of Sweden)
- Princess Maha Chakri Sirindhorn (representing the King of Thailand)
  - (Thailand) Princess Chulabhorn Walailak
- The Prince of Wales (representing the Queen of the United Kingdom)

== Riots ==
On the day of the inauguration, large-scale riots were staged by those advocating for squatter's rights. The protesters chanted the slogan Geen woning, geen kroning (No house, no coronation). Around 10,000 police officers and military personnel were present in Amsterdam for the inauguration, thus turning the riots into a major clash.

600 people were injured and, due to the large public support the royal family enjoyed, the riots largely turned public opinion against the squatters.

== See also ==
- Inauguration of Willem-Alexander
- Inauguration of the Dutch monarch
- Amsterdam coronation riots
