= Mantell =

Mantell is a surname. Notable people with the surname include:

- David Mantell (1934–2017), English cricketer
- Elizabeth Mantell (1941–1998), Scottish midwife and nurse
- G. D. Mantell, 10th Surveyor General of Ceylon
- Gideon Mantell (1790–1852), British obstetrician, geologist and palaeontologist
- Joe Mantell (1915–2010), American actor
- Mary Ann Mantell, palaeontologist
- Richard Mantell (b. 1981), British field hockey player
- Robert B. Mantell (1854–1928), Scottish actor
- Simon Mantell (b. 1984), British field hockey player
- Susan Mantell, American mechanical engineer
- Thomas F. Mantell (d. 1948), American pilot
- Walter Mantell (1820–1895), New Zealand scientist and politician

== See also ==
- Mantle (disambiguation)
- Mantel (disambiguation)
- Ord Mantell, a fictional planet in the Star Wars franchise
