= Mantel =

Mantel may refer to:

- Mantel, Germany, a town in Bavaria, Germany
- Fireplace mantel, a framework around a fireplace
- Mantel Corporation, a fictional organization in the video game Haze
- Mantel theorem, mathematical theorem in graph theory
- Mantel (climbing), a climbing move used to surmount a ledge or feature in the rock in the absence of any useful holds directly above.

== People ==
- Bronwen Mantel, Canadian actress
- Dave Mantel (1981–2018), Dutch actor, producer, and model
- Dutch Mantel, ring name of Wayne Cowan (born 1949), American professional wrestler
- Gerhard Mantel (1930–2012), German cellist and writer
- Henriette Mantel (born 1954), American writer, actress, and director
- Hilary Mantel (1952–2022), British novelist
- Hugo Mantel, German footballer
- Nathan Mantel (1919–2002), biostatistician
- Yisroel Mantel, American Orthodox rabbi
- Gregory Mantel, a fictional character in the soap opera EastEnders

== See also ==
- Mantel clock
- Mantle (disambiguation)
- Mantell (disambiguation)
