= Inauguration of the Dutch monarch =

Ceremonial swearing-in of the Dutch monarch

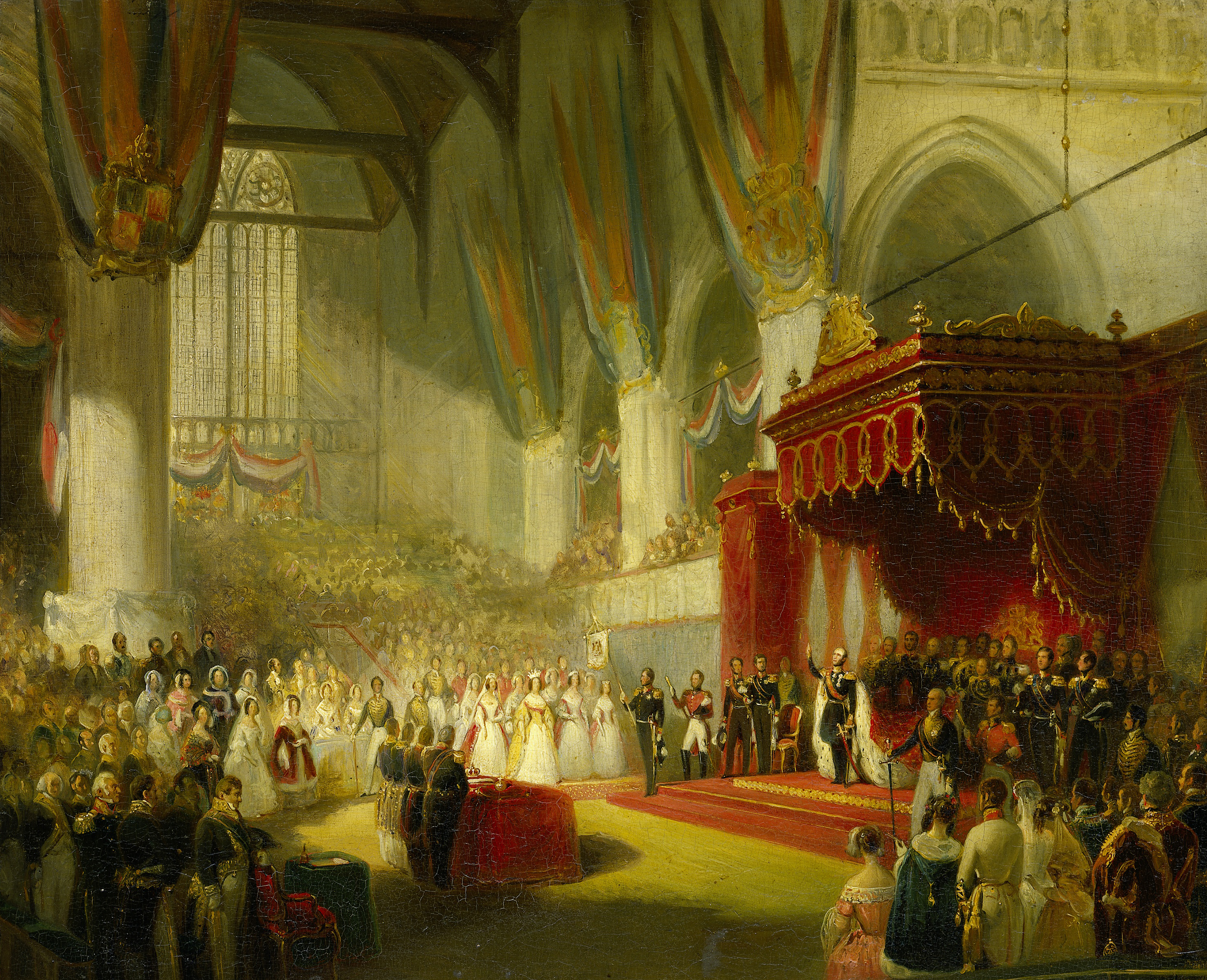
A painting by Nicolaas Pieneman depicting King William II swearing the oath during his inauguration on 28 November 1840

Upon their accession to the throne, the new Dutch monarch undergoes an inauguration ceremony as required by the constitution. The ceremony is taken as a joint session of the two houses of the States General, and is held at the Nieuwe Kerk in Amsterdam.

== Background ==
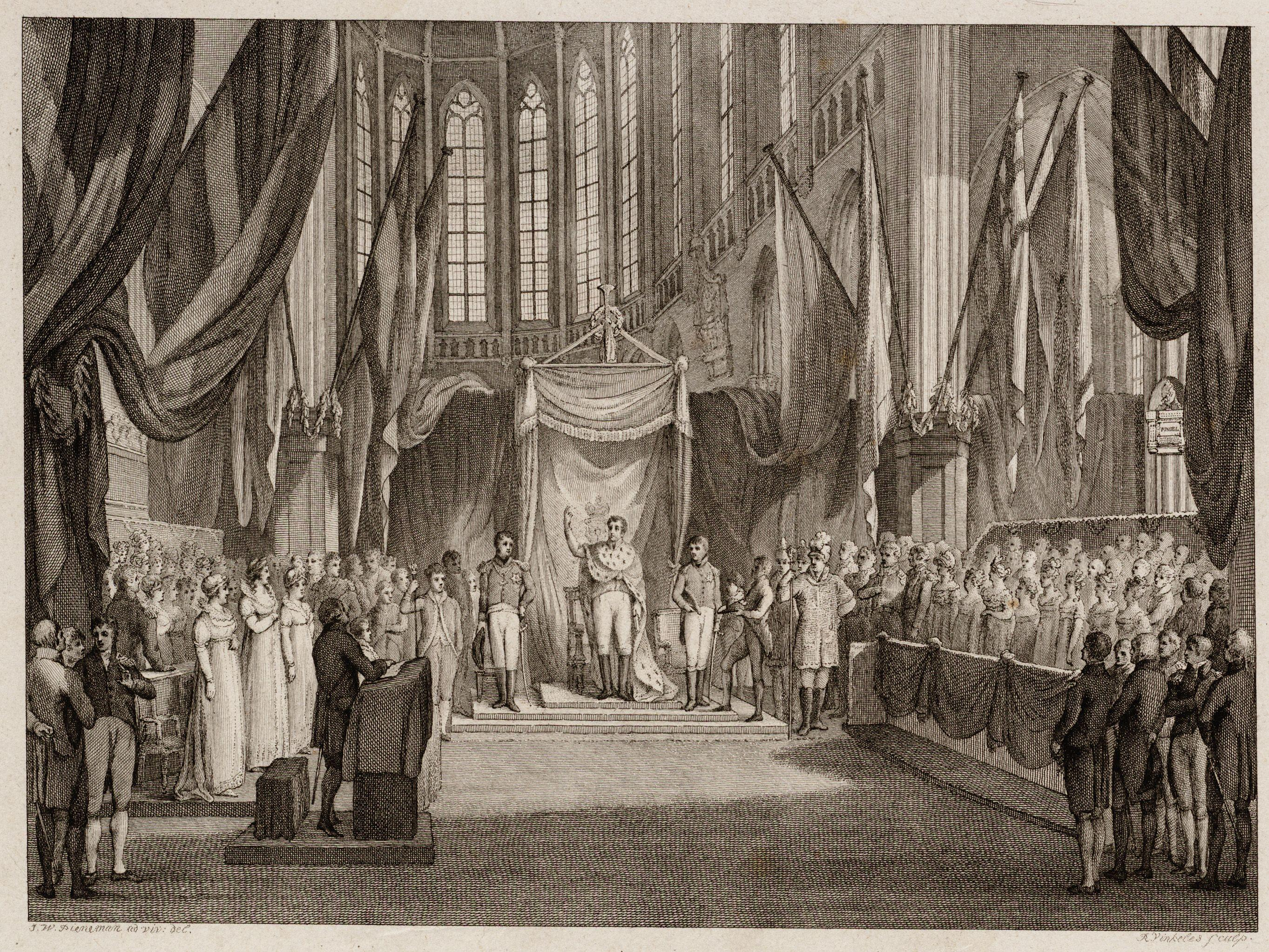
Inauguration of William I, 30 March 1814

Just as in most other European monarchies today (except the monarchy of the United Kingdom), in the Netherlands new monarchs are not crowned. The Dutch crown and other regalia have never been physically bestowed. Article 32 of the Dutch constitution states that as soon as the monarch assumes the royal prerogative, he is to be sworn in and invested in Amsterdam at a public joint session of both houses of the States General.

An inauguration is strictly ceremonial as the successor to the throne accedes instantly when the previous one dies or abdicates. The last Dutch monarch to reign until his death was William III in 1890. His successor was his daughter, Wilhelmina; however, she was not inaugurated until her coming of age in 1898, as the monarch may not exercise the royal prerogative until reaching the age of 18. Her mother, Emma of Waldeck and Pyrmont, acted as regent from 1890 to 1898. Wilhelmina later abdicated and passed the throne to her daughter Juliana in 1948.

== Abdication ==
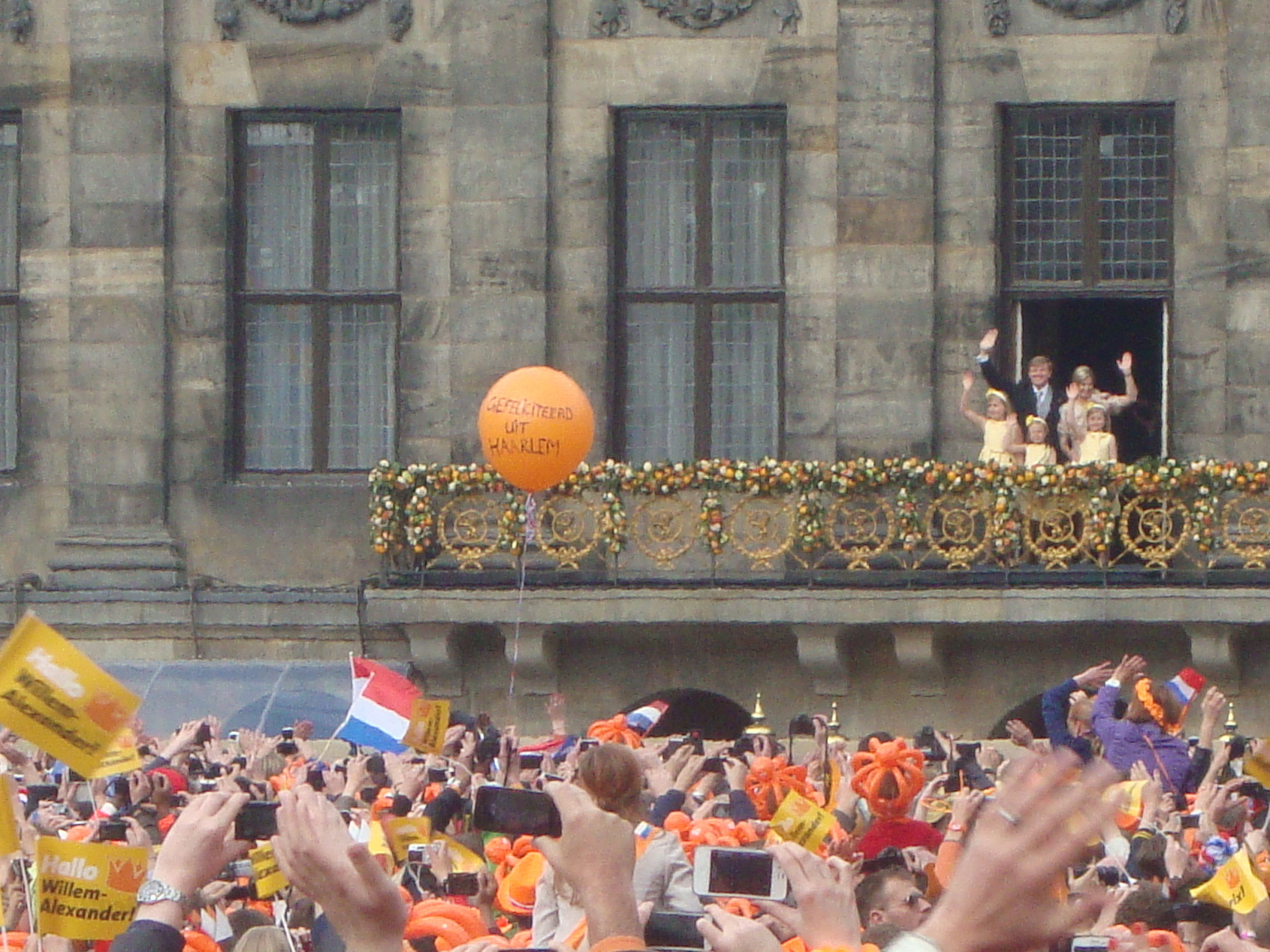
King Willem Alexander and his family at the balcony of the Royal Palace of Amsterdam following the abdication of Queen Beatrix, on April 30, 2013

All Dutch monarchs since Wilhelmina have so far chosen to abdicate their throne after a certain period reigning. The monarch, the heir to the throne, the royal family and cabinet led by the prime minister meet in the State Hall of the Royal Palace of Amsterdam. The monarch first signs the instrument of abdication, which is then signed by their heir as the new monarch, then by members of the royal family and the government. As soon as the instrument is signed, the new monarch's accession is a legal fait accompli. The previous monarch then steps onto the balcony of the palace, and introduces the new monarch to the waiting public outside.

After the signing, the new monarch proceeds from the palace to the Nieuwe Kerk, where the States General of the Netherlands and the cabinet along with guests of honour have assembled for the inauguration.

== Ceremony ==
The ceremony takes place as a joint session of the two houses of the States General (Verenigde Vergadering) and is presided over by the president of the joint session (i.e. the president of the senate). The ritual is held at the Nieuwe Kerk, in the capital city of Amsterdam. Regalia such as the crown, orb and sceptre are present, but are never physically given to the monarch, nor worn by him or her. Instead, these are placed on cushions upon what is called a credence table. The royal regalia surround a copy of the Dutch constitution. Two other regalia–the sword of state and the standard of the kingdom bearing the coat of arms of the Netherlands–are carried by two senior military officers. During the ceremony, the monarch, vested in an ermine-lined heirloom mantle, is seated on a chair of state (as is their consort) upon a raised dais, opposite members of the States General.

The two parts

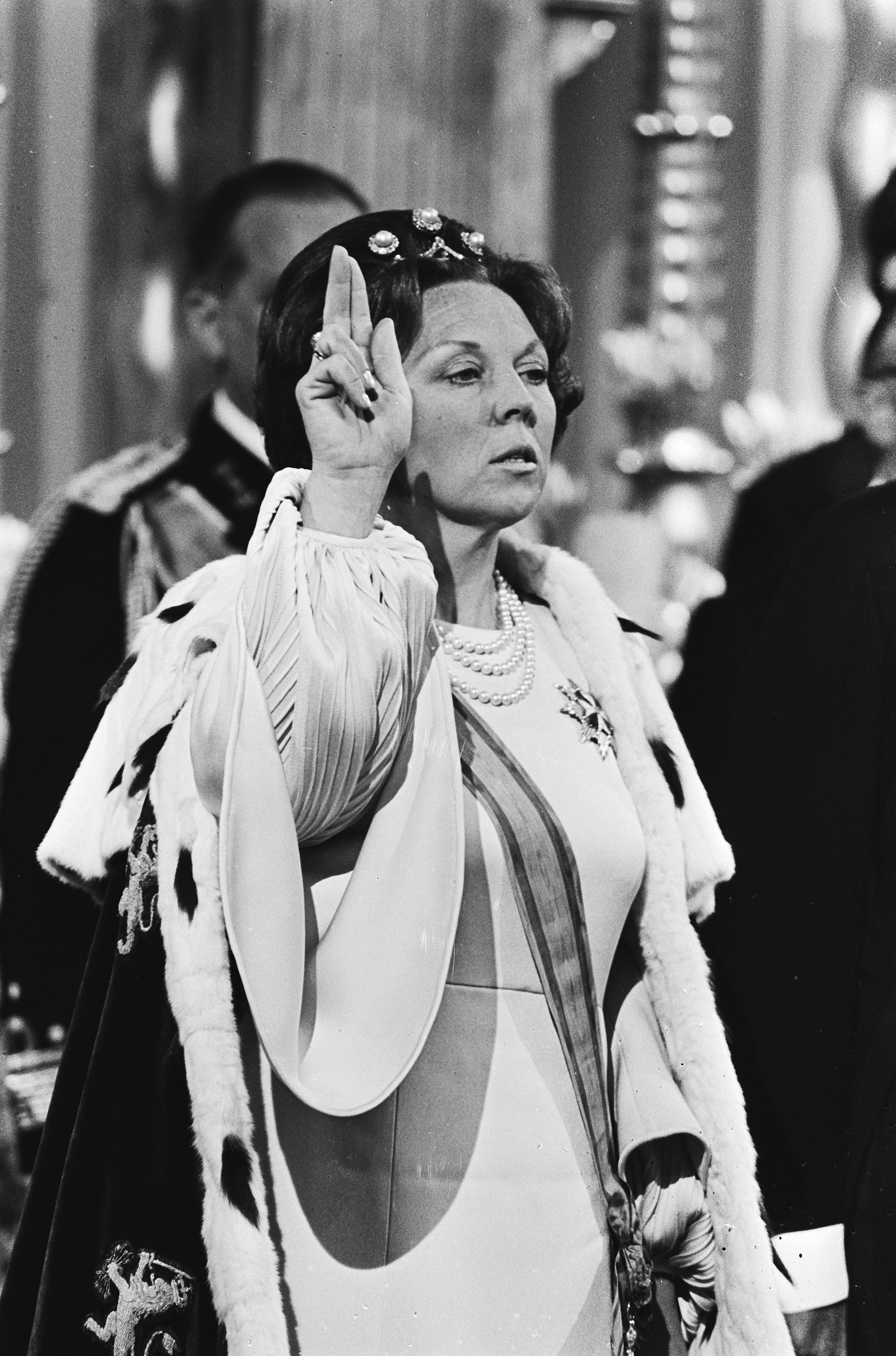
Beatrix displays the Spreekgebaar during her inauguration in 1980

The new monarch has their master of ceremonies announce their arrival from the palace, and they take their seat on the chair of state facing the States General and the regalia. The monarch gives an address before swearing the oath to uphold the constitution and protect the people of the Kingdom. In reciting the final formula to swear the oath, the new monarch often displays the Spreekgebaar: the gesture has them raise the right hand, extending upwards and joining only the index finger and middle finger.

I swear (promise) to the people of the Kingdom that I shall constantly preserve and uphold the Charter for the Kingdom of the Netherlands and the Constitution.
I swear (promise) that I shall defend and preserve the independence and the territory of the Kingdom to the best of my ability, that I shall protect the freedom and rights of all Dutch citizens and residents, and that I shall employ all means placed at my disposal by the law to preserve and promote prosperity, as a good king (queen) should do.
So help me God! (This I promise!)

Following the monarch's oath, the monarch is paid homage to by the assemblage of people. The president of the joint session makes a declaration on behalf of those assembled and then swears or affirms this declaration.

We receive and invest, in the name of the people of the Kingdom and in accordance with the Charter for the Kingdom of the Netherlands and the Constitution, you as King (Queen); we swear (promise) that we will maintain your inviolability and the rights of your Crown.
We swear (promise) to do all that a good and faithful States General, States of Aruba, States of Curaçao and States of St Maarten should do;
So help us God! (This we promise!)

Following this, the names of members of the States General are called out, who then stand and swear or affirm this declaration in turn. They either display the Spreekgebaar like the new monarch and swear, "Zo waarlijk helpe mij God Almachtig" ("So truly help me, God Almighty"), or affirm with a simple "Dat beloof ik" ("That, I promise.").

After every willing member has sworn or affirmed the declaration, the president of the joint session declares the ceremony to have been completed. This is followed by the senior King of Arms exclaiming that the monarch has been inaugurated and the president crying "Long live the King!" to the response of three hurrahs from those assembled. The other heralds proceed outside the church to Dam Square where they also announce to the wider public that the monarch has been inaugurated, and also cry "Long live the King!"

After the homage, the monarch and his retinue then exit the church and return to the palace. The ceremony is then followed by an official reception at the palace.

== Medals ==
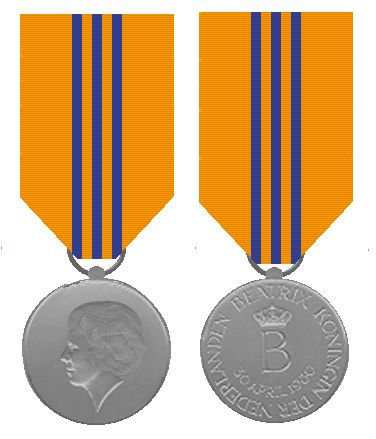
Commemoration medal for Queen Beatrix's inauguration in 1980

Since the inauguration of Queen Wilhelmina in 1898, the Dutch government issues for each inauguration a limited number of commemoration medals (Inhuldigingsmedaille). The obverse shows the profile of the new monarch, while the reverse features the royal monogram, surrounded on the rim with the name of the monarch and the date of the inauguration. The ribbon's colour is mainly in orange, the colour of the royal house, and blue.

== End of military service ==
In contrast to most other monarchies, the Dutch monarch cannot hold a formal military position and retires from military service upon accession to the throne. This is based in the fact that in the Netherlands the supreme command is with the government (as a whole) instead of the monarch, who as head of state is part of that government. A special Royal Distinction not indicating any formal rank was created to allow the monarch to show his commitment to the armed forces.

== See also ==
- Coronations in Europe
- Inauguration of Beatrix
- Inauguration of Willem-Alexander
