= John Mantle =

John Mantle may refer to:

- John Mantle (bishop) (1946–2010), Bishop of Brechin
- John Mantle (rugby) (1942–2018), British rugby footballer
- Jack Foreman Mantle (1917–1940), VC recipient
- The "Shadow Mantle Holder," an enemy in Deltarune.

== See also ==
- John Mantley (1920–2003), actor, writer, director, screenwriter and producer
