= Susan Mantell =

American mechanical engineer

Susan C. Mantell is an American mechanical engineer interested in the design, fabrication, and longevity of structures made from polymers and composite materials, and the use of these structures in renewable energy systems and energy-efficient architecture. Her research has also included work on microelectromechanical systems. She is James J. Ryan Professor, Morse Alumni Distinguished Teaching Professor, and head of the Department of Mechanical Engineering at the University of Minnesota.

== Education and career ==
Mantell majored in mechanical engineering at Stanford University, graduating in 1981. After working in industry in Massachusetts for several years, she returned to graduate study for a master's degree at Northeastern University in 1987, and then a Ph.D. from Stanford in 1991.

She became an assistant professor at the University of Minnesota in 1991, choosing the university in part to solve a two-body problem with her husband, who was entering graduate study at the same time. There, she became the only woman in the university's Department of Mechanical Engineering. She was promoted to associate professor in 1998 and full professor in 2003. She has been James J. Ryan Professor, and head of the mechanical engineering department, since 2019.

== Recognition ==
Mantell was elected as an ASME Fellow in 2016.

The University of Minnesota Alumni Association gave Mantell the Horace T. Morse Award for Outstanding Contributions to Undergraduate Education, and she was given the permanent designation as a Distinguished University Teaching Professor, in 2011.
