= Theodor Mantler =

Austrian footballer and referee

Personal information
- Full name: Theodor Mantler
- Date of birth: 1893
- Place of birth: Vienna, Austro-Hungary
- Date of death: 27 January 1970 (aged 76–77)
- Position: Goalkeeper

Senior career*
Years	Team	Apps	(Gls)
1916–1917	Rapid Wien	19	(0)
1917–191x	Germania Schwechat		
191x–19xx	UTK Novi Sad		
- * Club domestic league appearances and goals

Theodor Mantler (1893 – 27 January 1970) was an Austrian football goalkeeper and referee.

== Club career ==
He played with SK Rapid Wien in the season 1916–17 when they won the championship, and then he started the season 1917–18 and after making one league appearance he moved to Germania Schwechat on 3 September 1917. After the end of First World War, Mantler played for some time in Yugoslavia with UTK Novi Sad in the Novi Sad Football Subassociation. Later, he returned to Austria and became a referee.

== Honours ==
Rapid Wien

- Austrian Championship: 1916–17
