= Mantle (royal garment) =

Garment worn by a ruling monarch as a symbol of authority

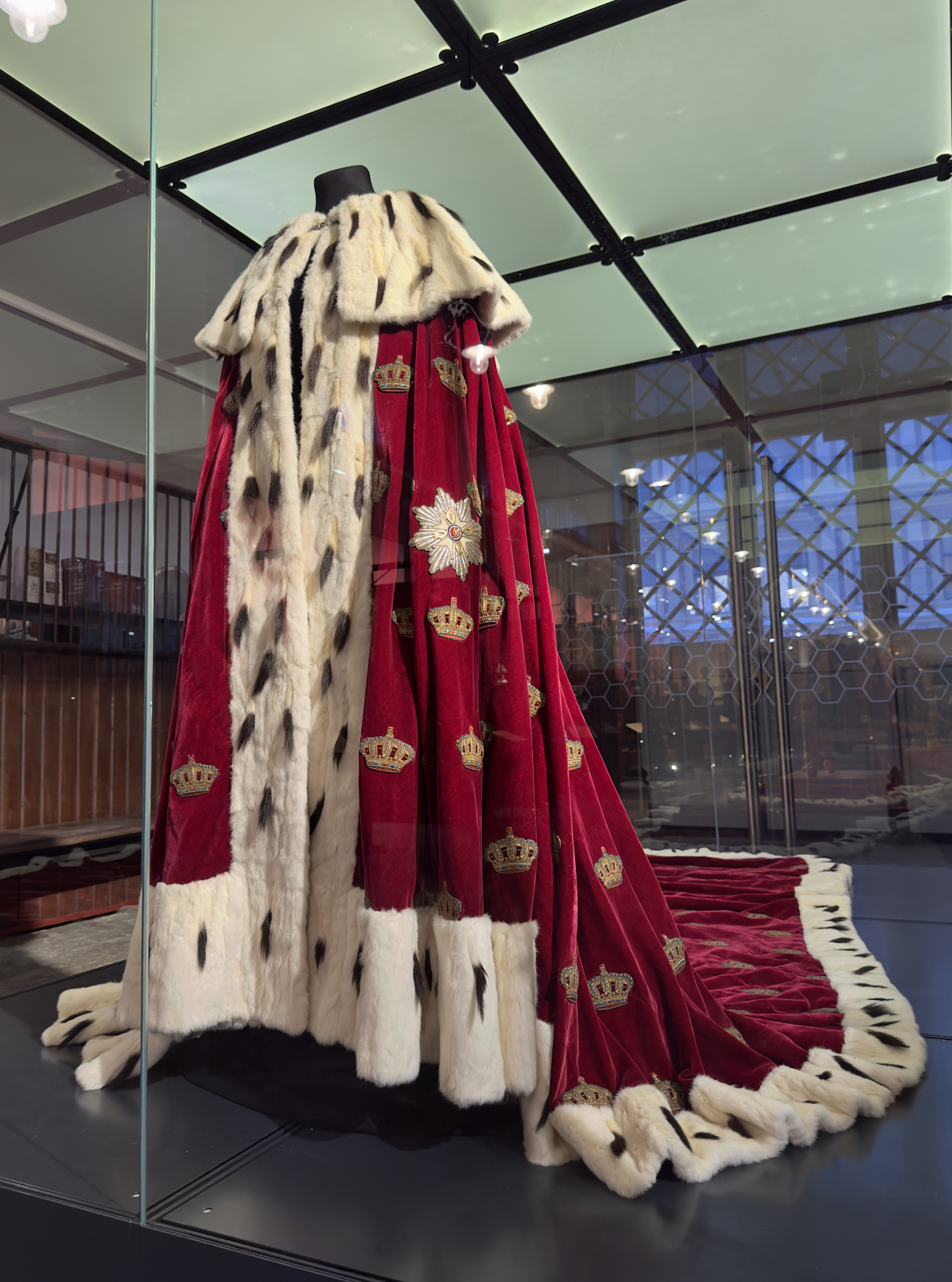
A royal mantle

A royal mantle, or more simply a mantle, is a garment normally worn by emperors, kings or queens as a symbol of authority. When worn at a coronation, such mantles may be referred to as coronation mantles. Many princes also wear such a mantle. Sometimes the mantles are worn only once, but in other instances they may be worn or used on other occasions, such as during the opening of a session of the nation's legislature. Mantles feature prominently in state portraiture and artwork featuring monarchs and princes.

In principle, there is no difference between the mantles of an emperor and king. Different countries have their own styles, and the shape of mantles has changed somewhat over the centuries. The oldest coats were not very long, and they were not lined with fur. In the 18th century, cloaks become more like each other and appeared everywhere in Europe. The French example was lined with fur, and a cloak with a long train became standard. The German emperors continued their short coat from the 12th century to the end of their empire. The Hungarian Kings also kept using their short coat from the reign of Saint Stephen until the end of their kingdom.

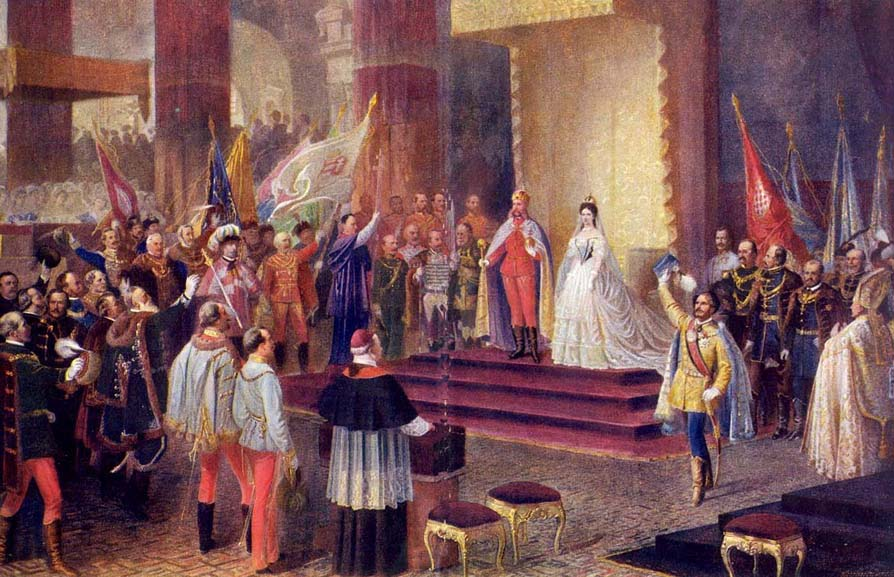
Coronation of Francis Joseph I and Elisabeth at Matthias Church, Buda, 8 June 1867. Notice the short mantle worn by the King.

Originally, mantles and the religious cope, coming from similar origins as a cloak worn by all classes, were indistinguishable, except that the religious garment may have a flap representing a hood, and the mantle may be fastened at the shoulder instead of the front. Therefore, while the cope was used by all clerics, the mantle would be used by royalty on occasions of a sacred character. The Coronation cloak of the Holy Roman Empire and Sicily was made semicircular in imitation of the cope of clergy. The royal mantle of the kings of France, which was based on the Ephod of a High Priest of Israel, also stood in for the chasuble of a priest, to emphasize the religious character of the coronation; from Louis XIII the mantle was purple, to represent both temporal authority (the azure of the French coat of arms) and religious authority (the scarlet robes of cardinals).

The non-crowned but inaugurated Dutch kings wear a robe on the French model. In the Netherlands, one does not speak of a coronation mantle but uses the term "royal robe" (Dutch: Koningsmantel; Dutch phonetic: γoningsmant∂l).

== Gallery ==
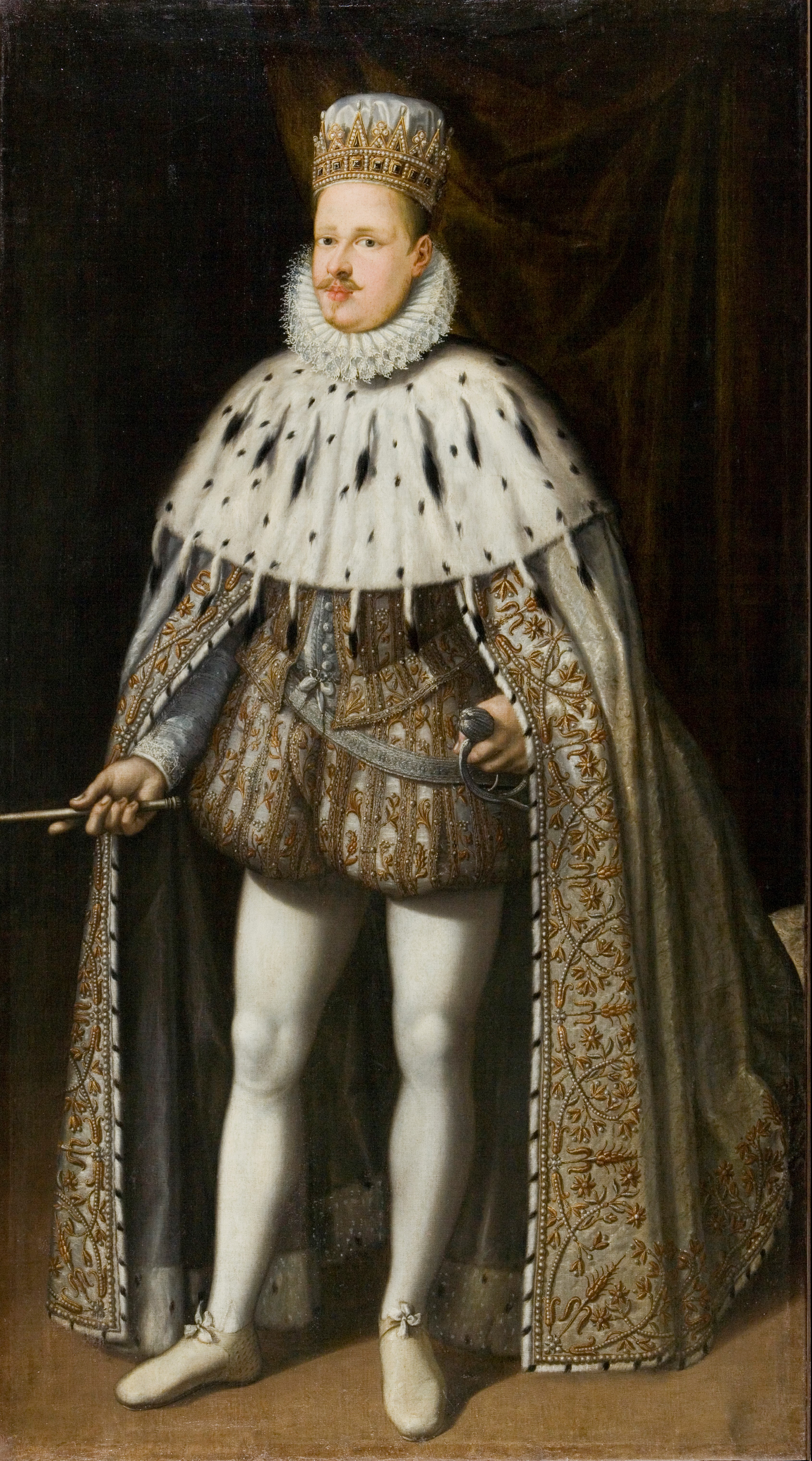
Vincenzo I Gonzaga

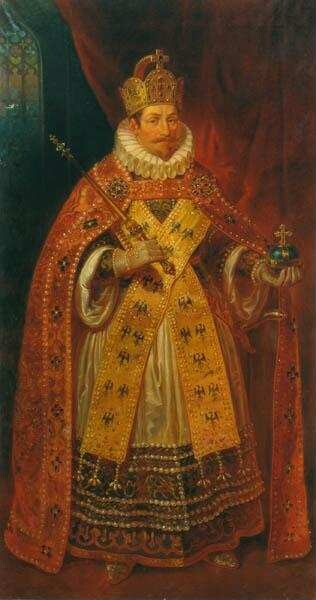
Emperor Ferdinand III of Habsburg

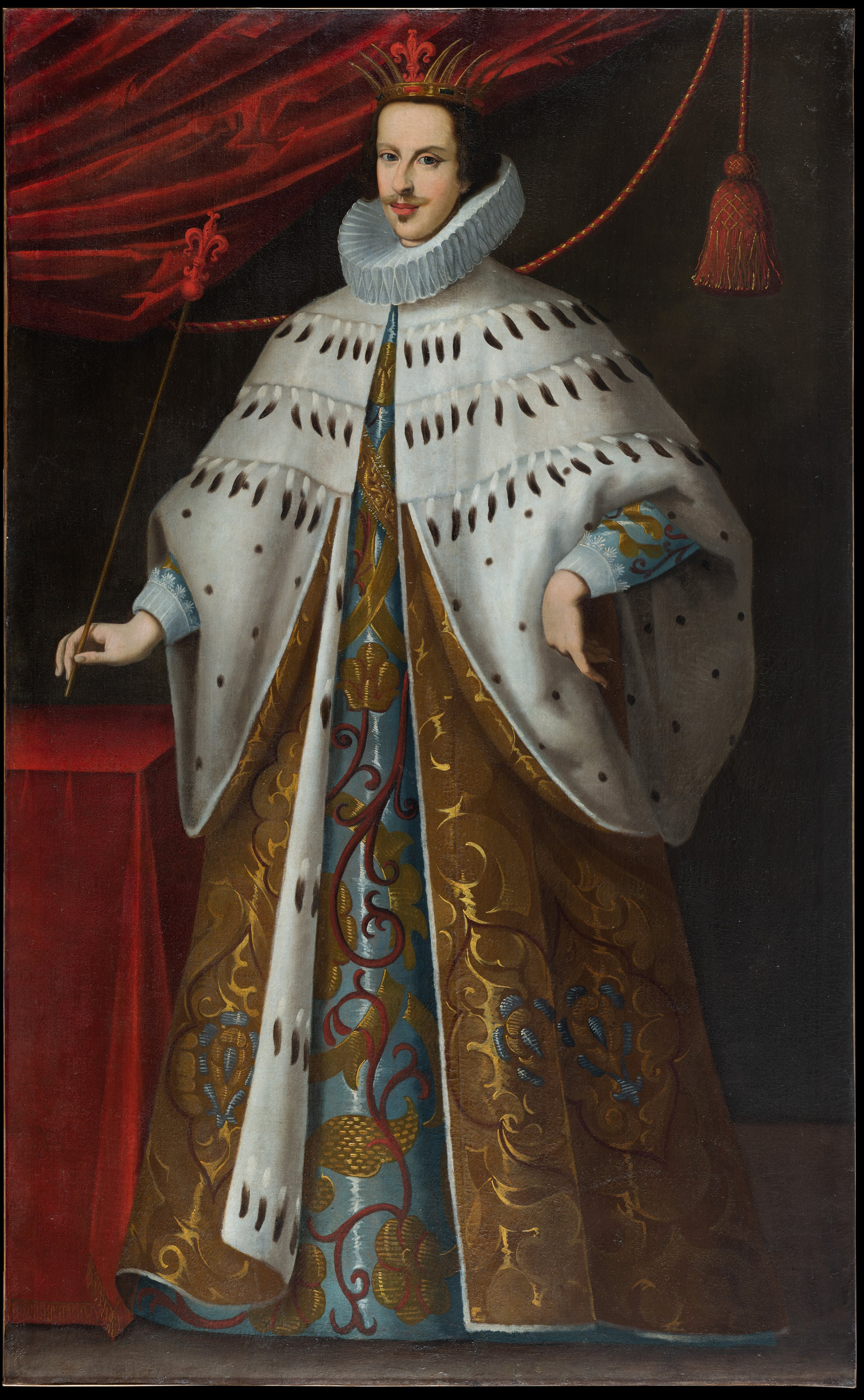
Cosimo II de' Medici

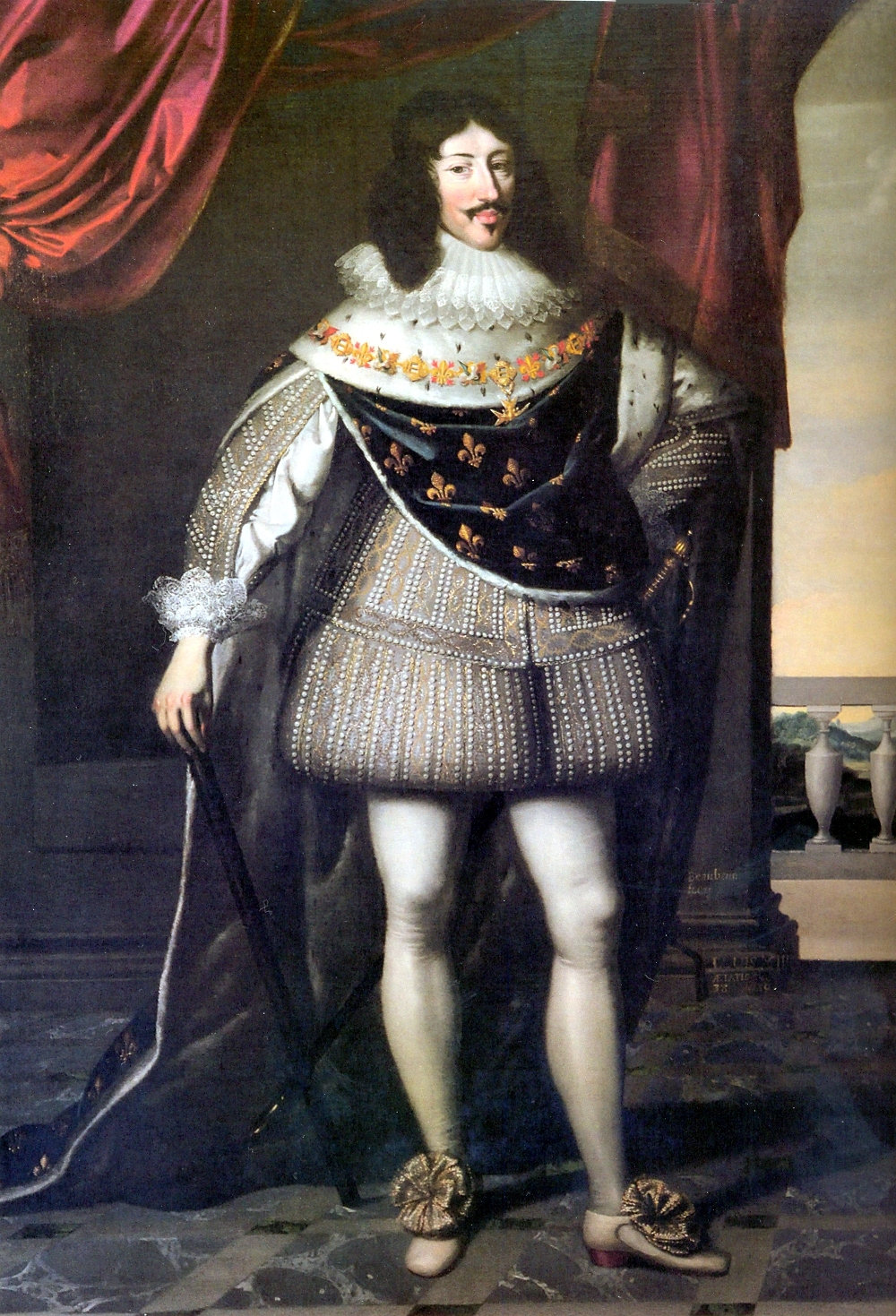
Louis XIII of France

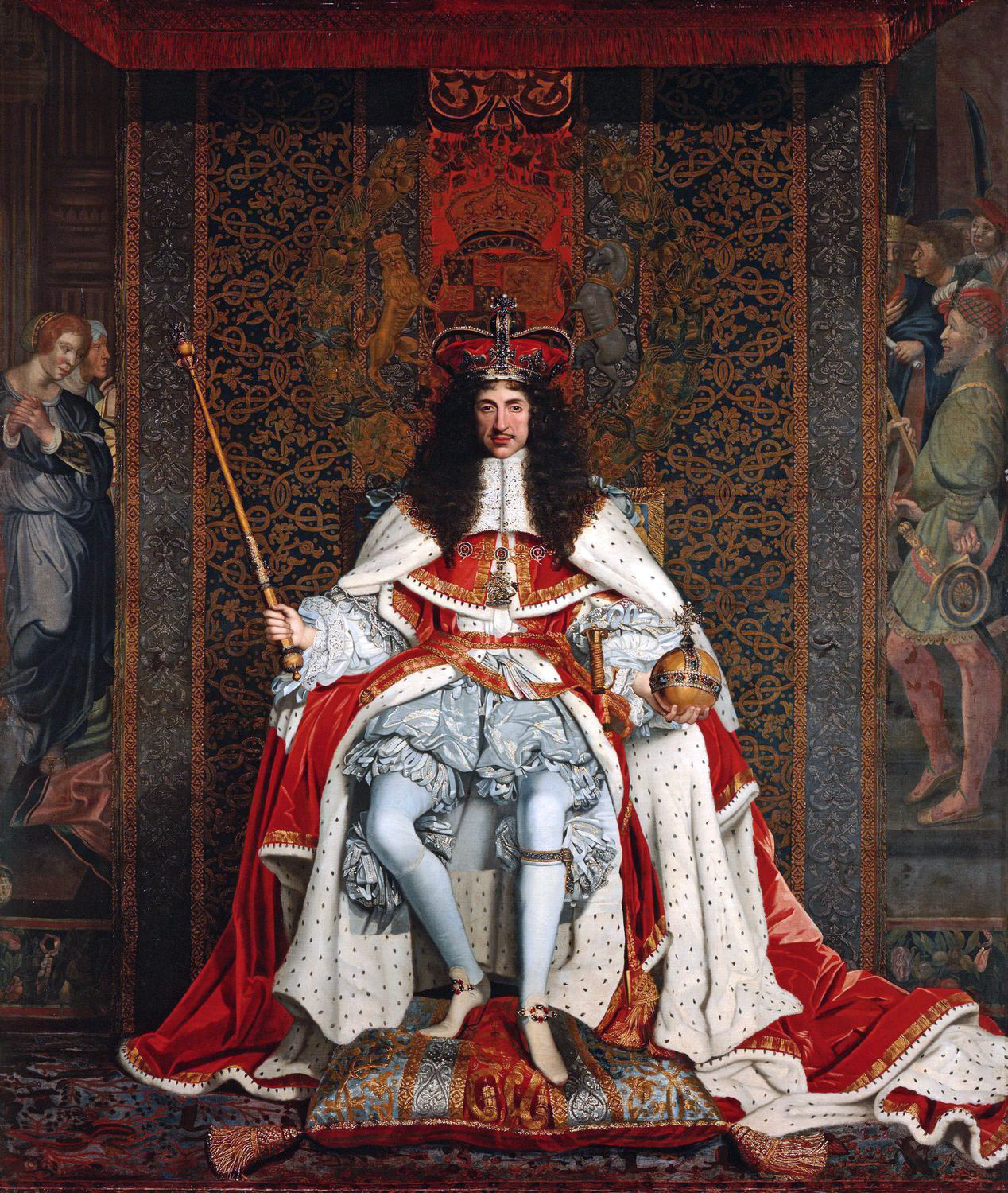
Charles II of England

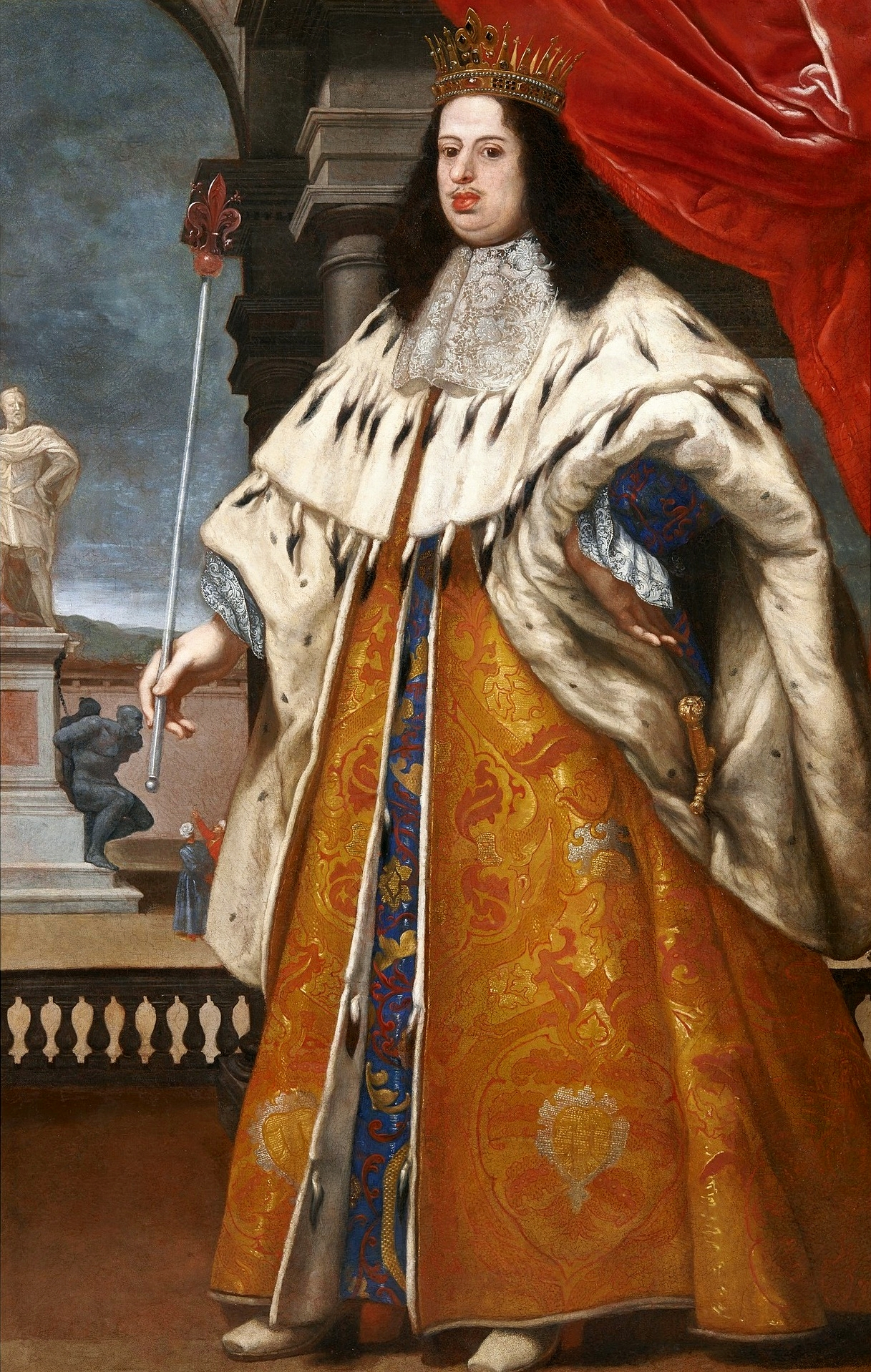
Cosimo III de' Medici of Tuscany

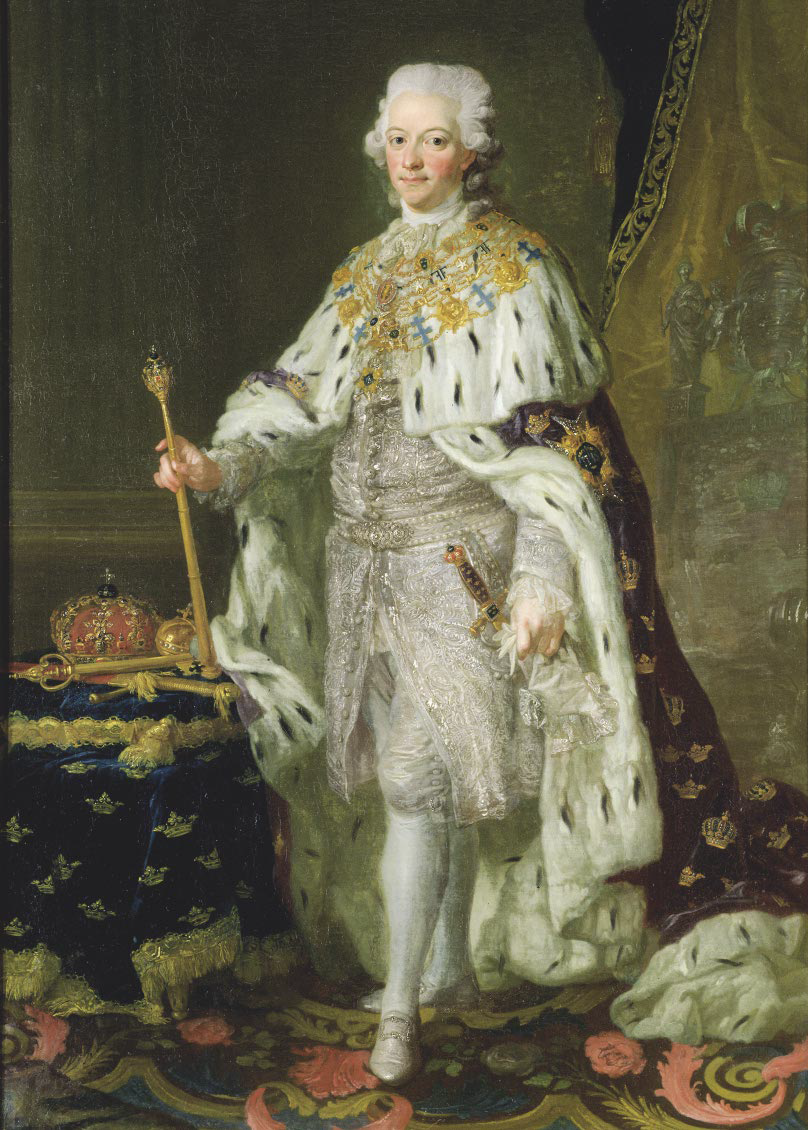
Gustav III of Sweden

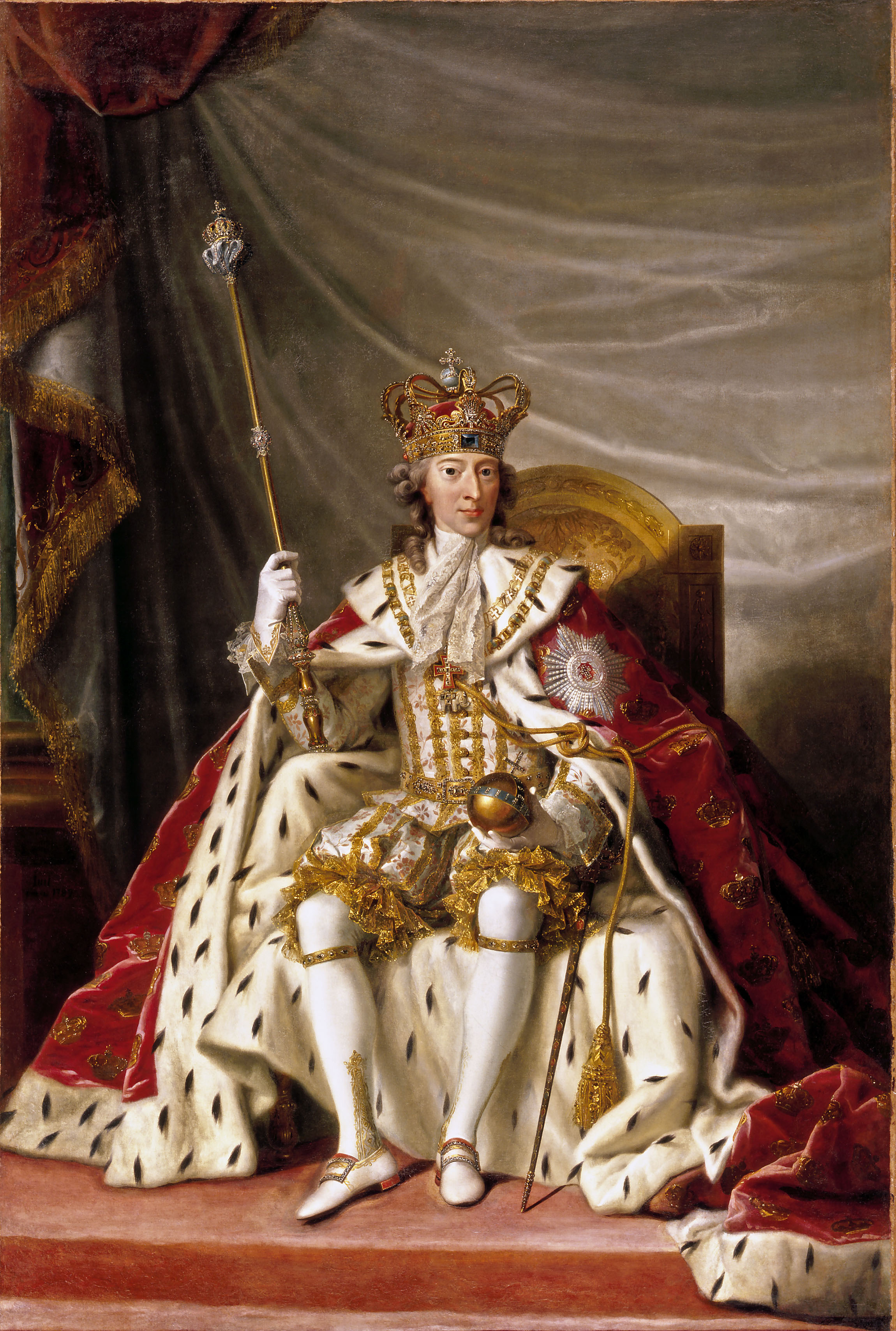
Christian VII of Denmark

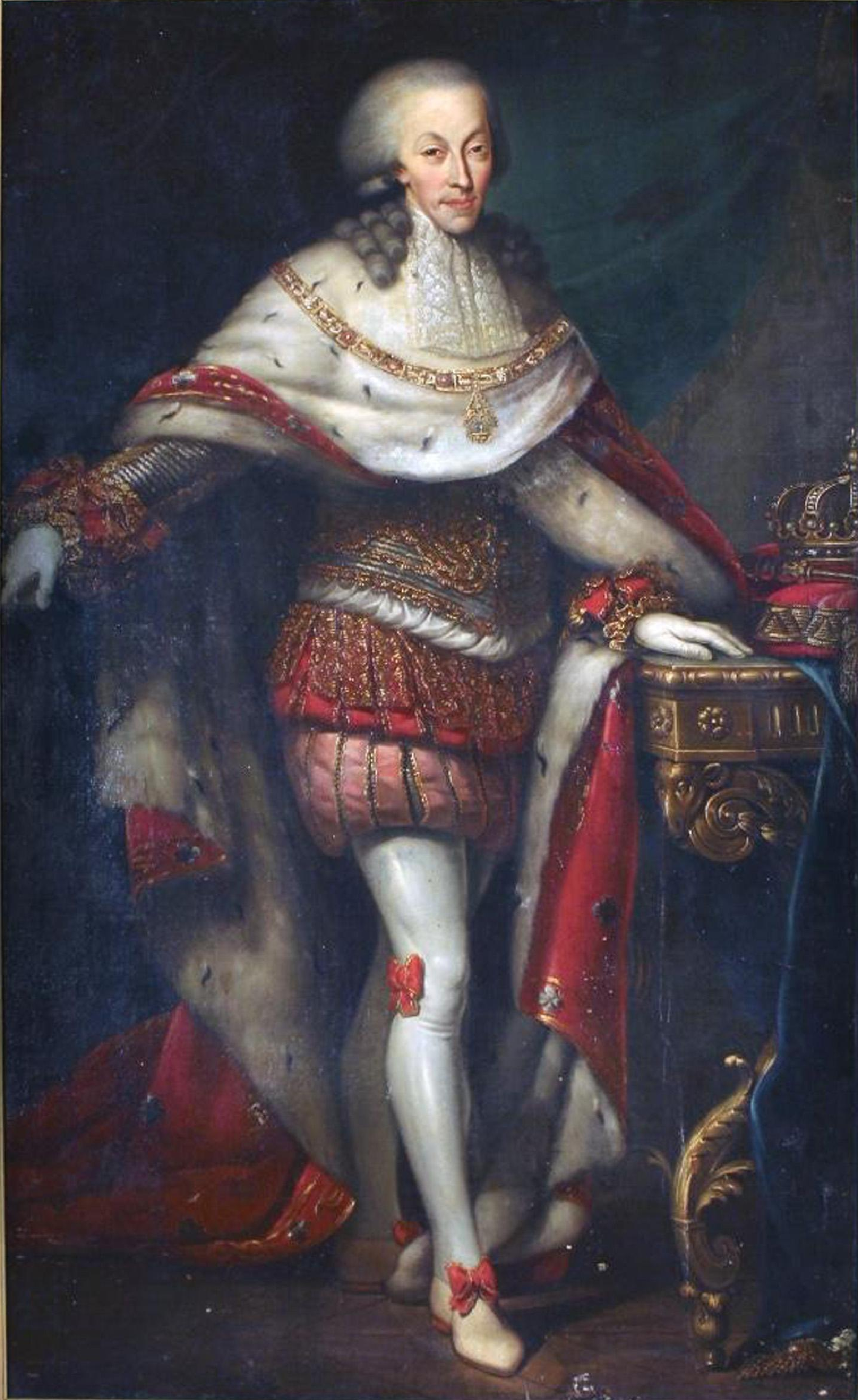
Charles Emmanuel IV

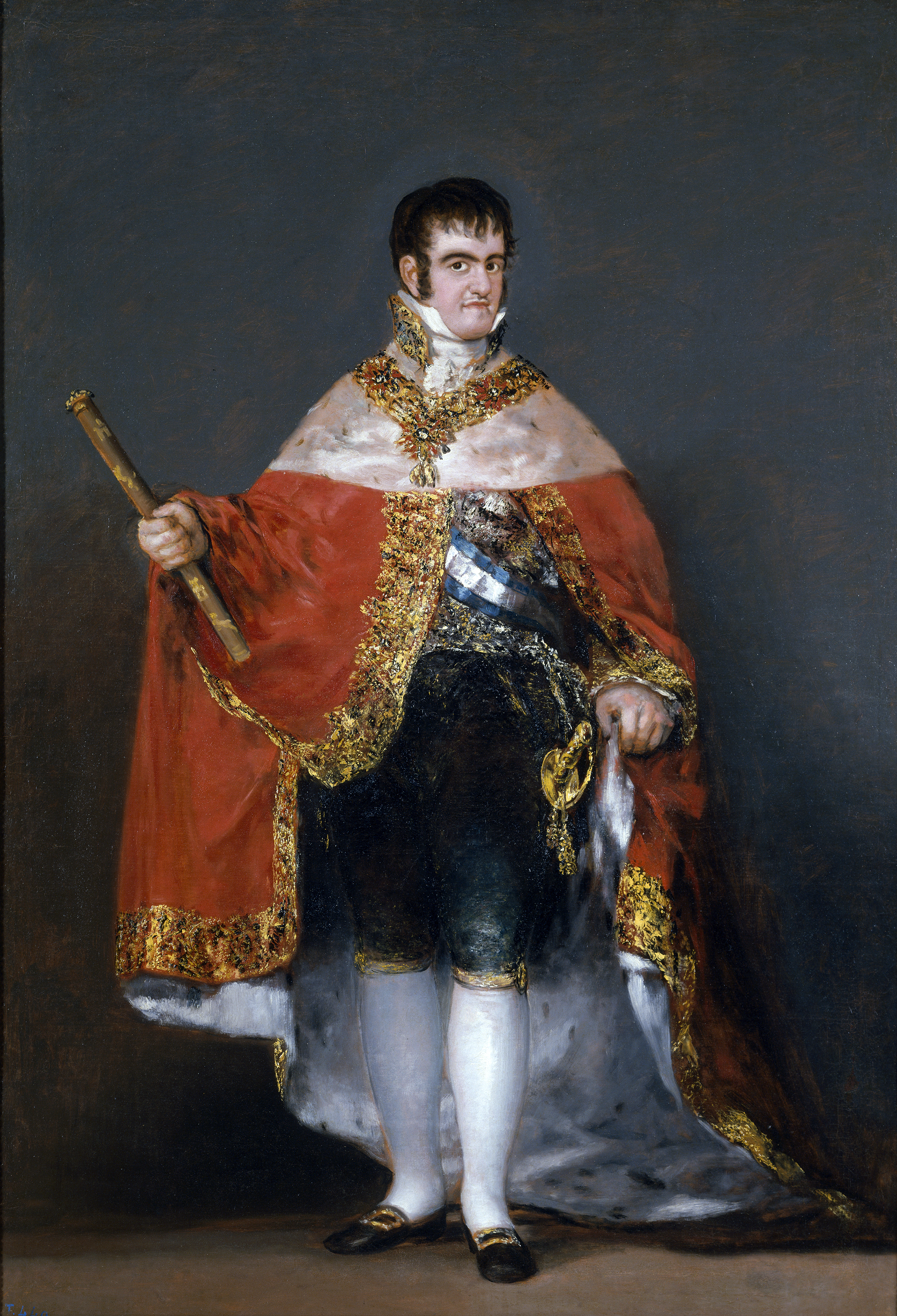
Ferdinand VII of Spain

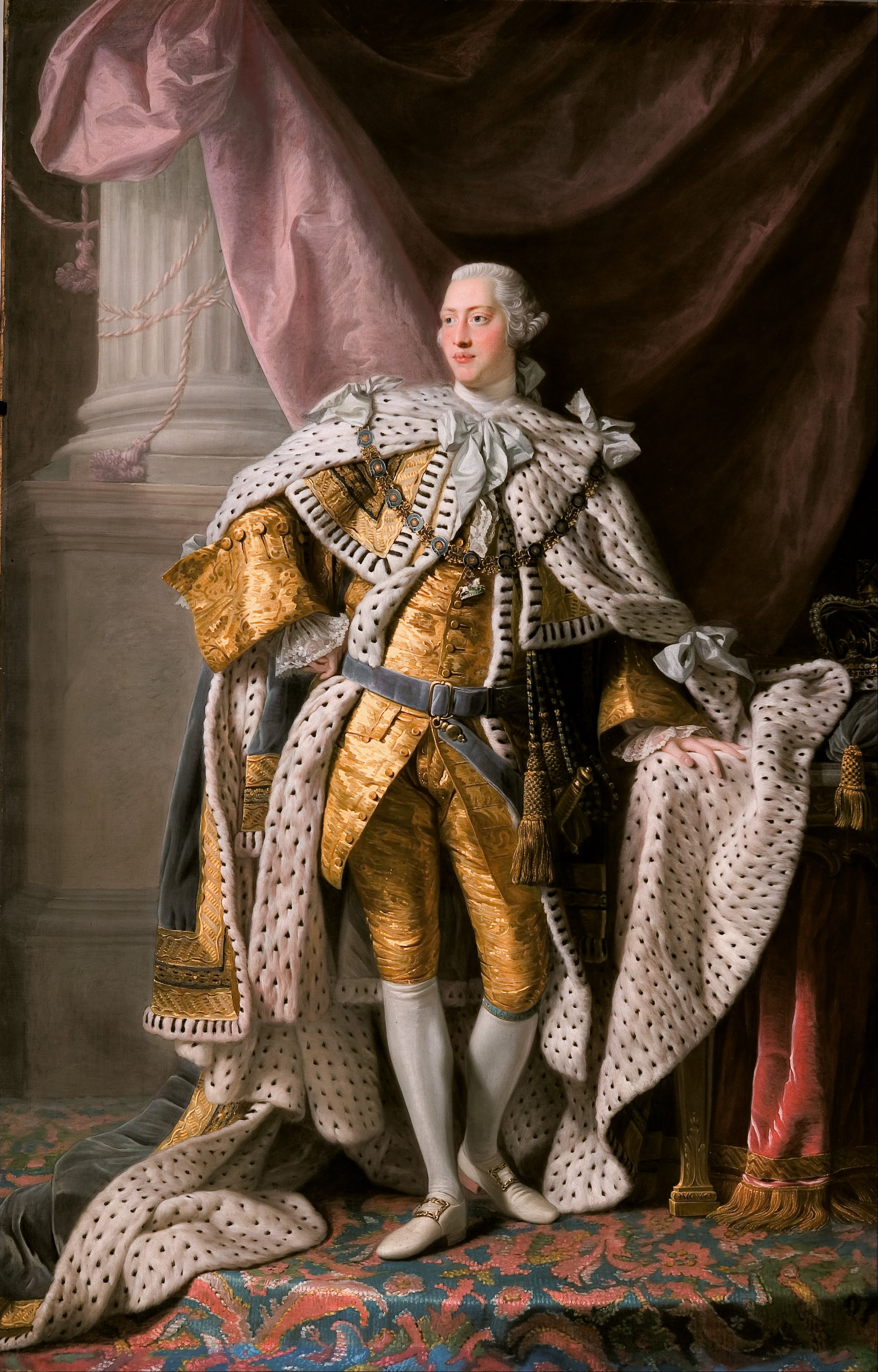
George III of Great Britain

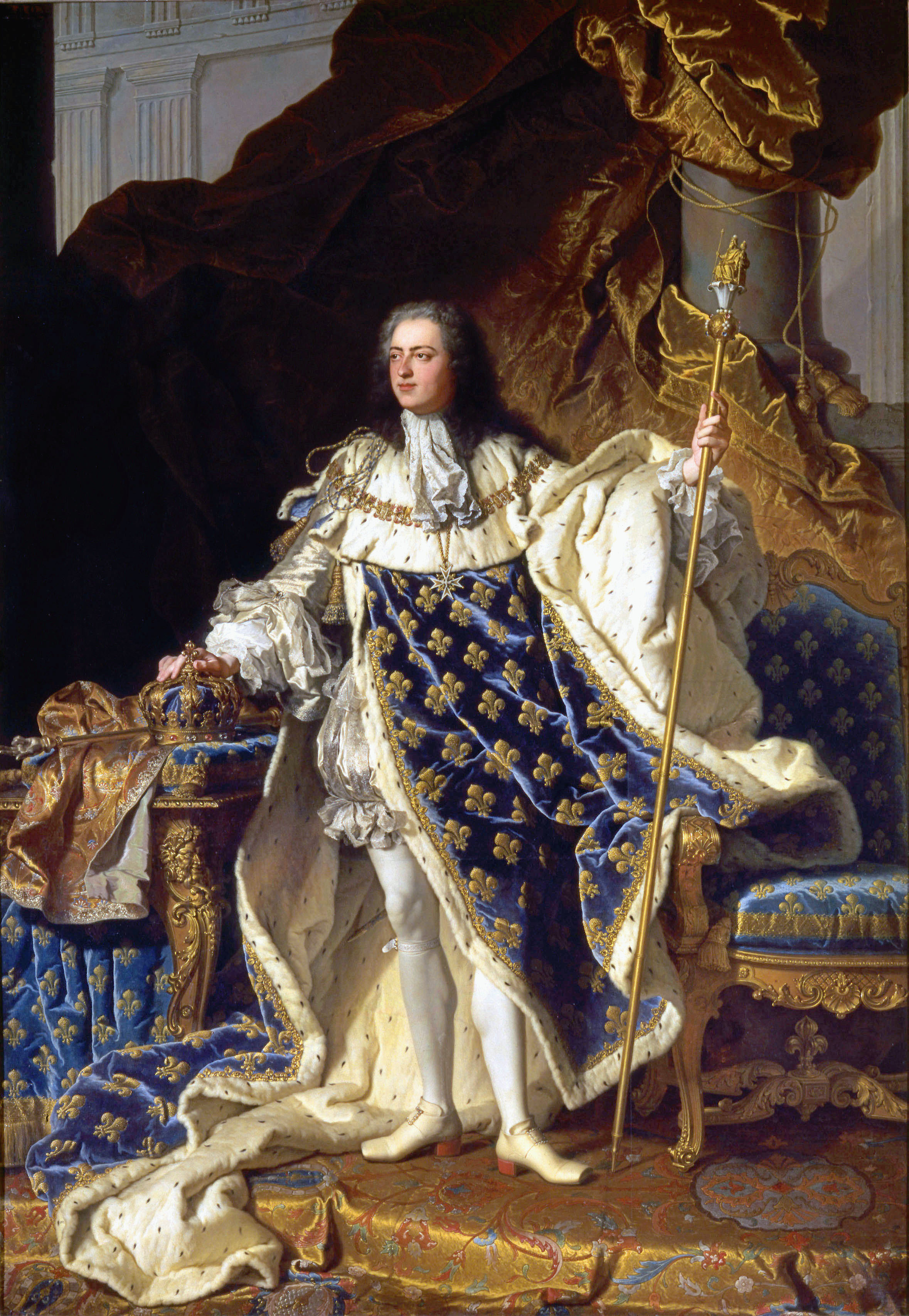
Louis XV of France

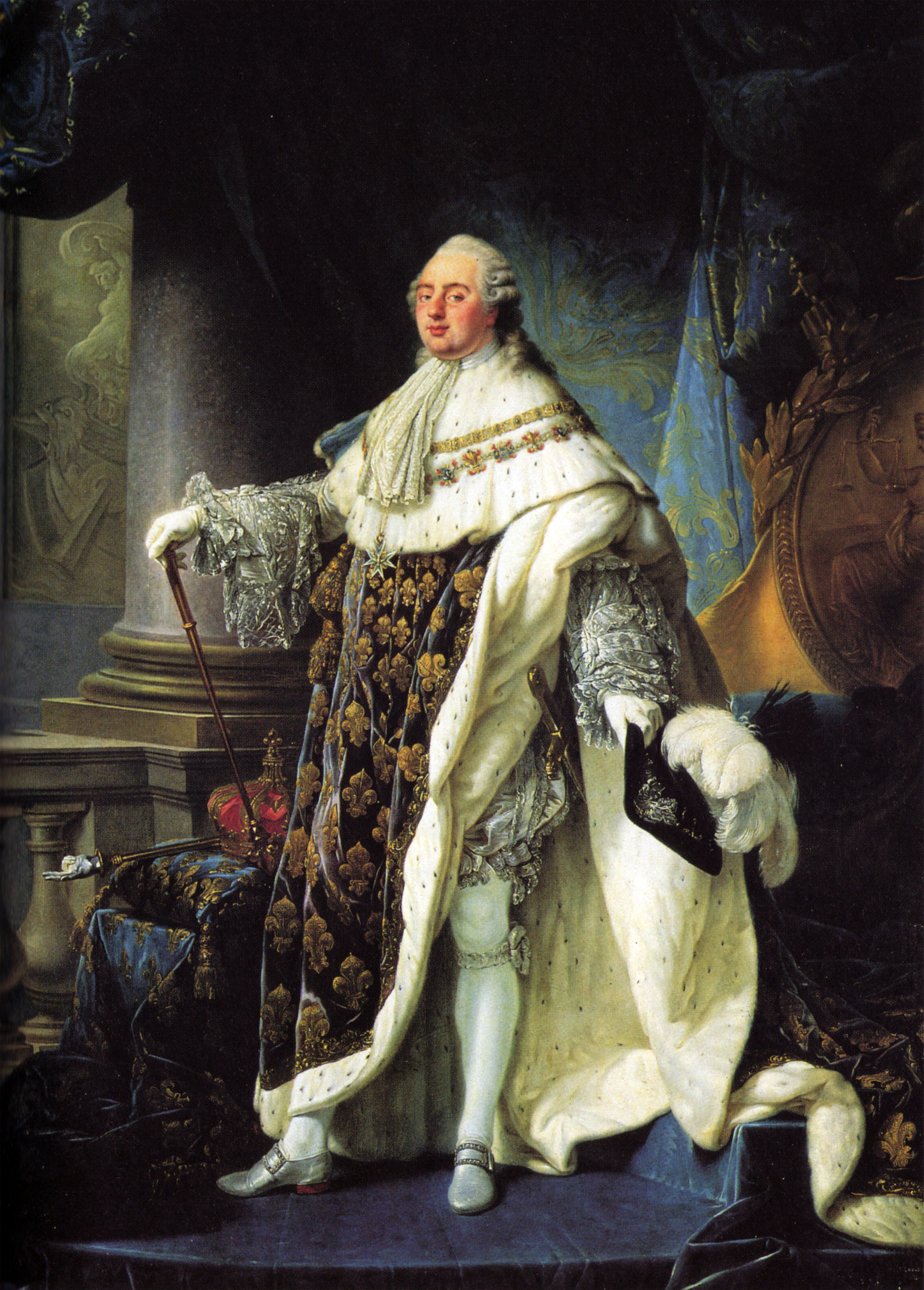
Louis XVI of France

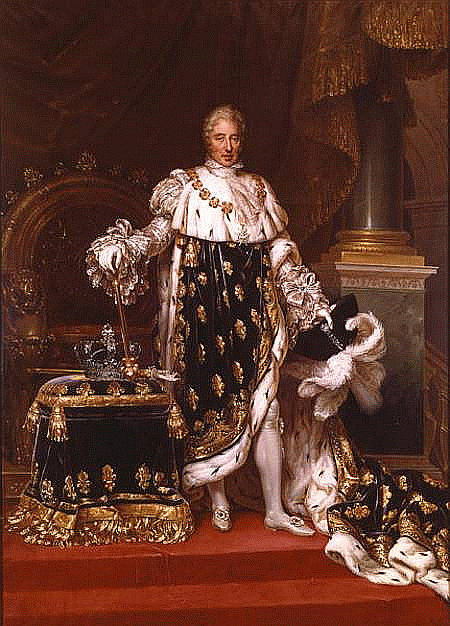
Charles X of France

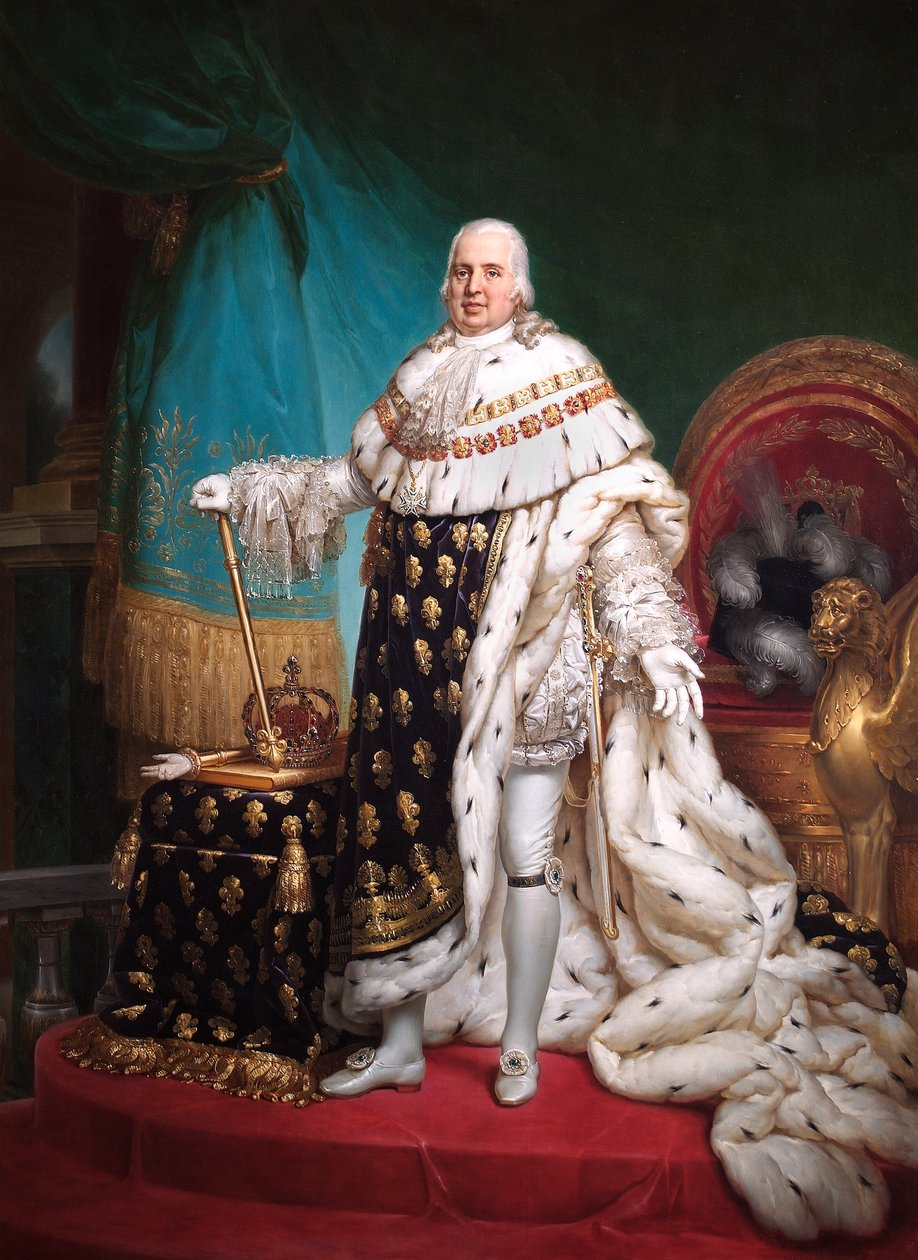
Louis XVIII of France

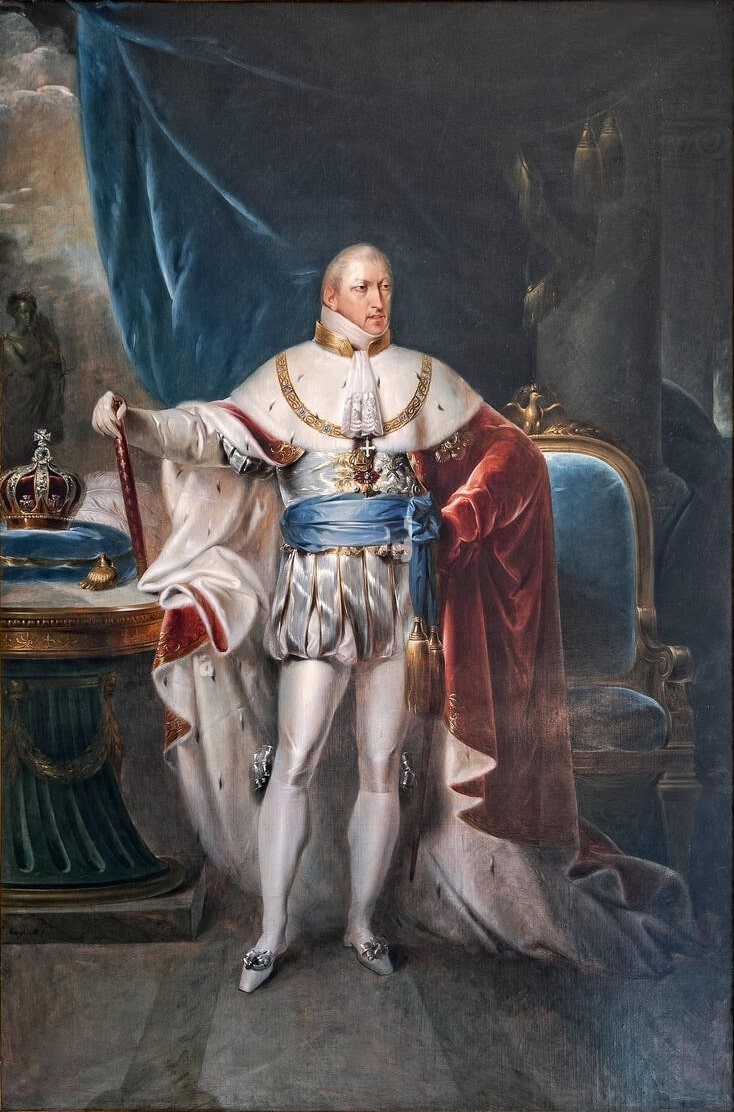
King Charles Felix of Savoy

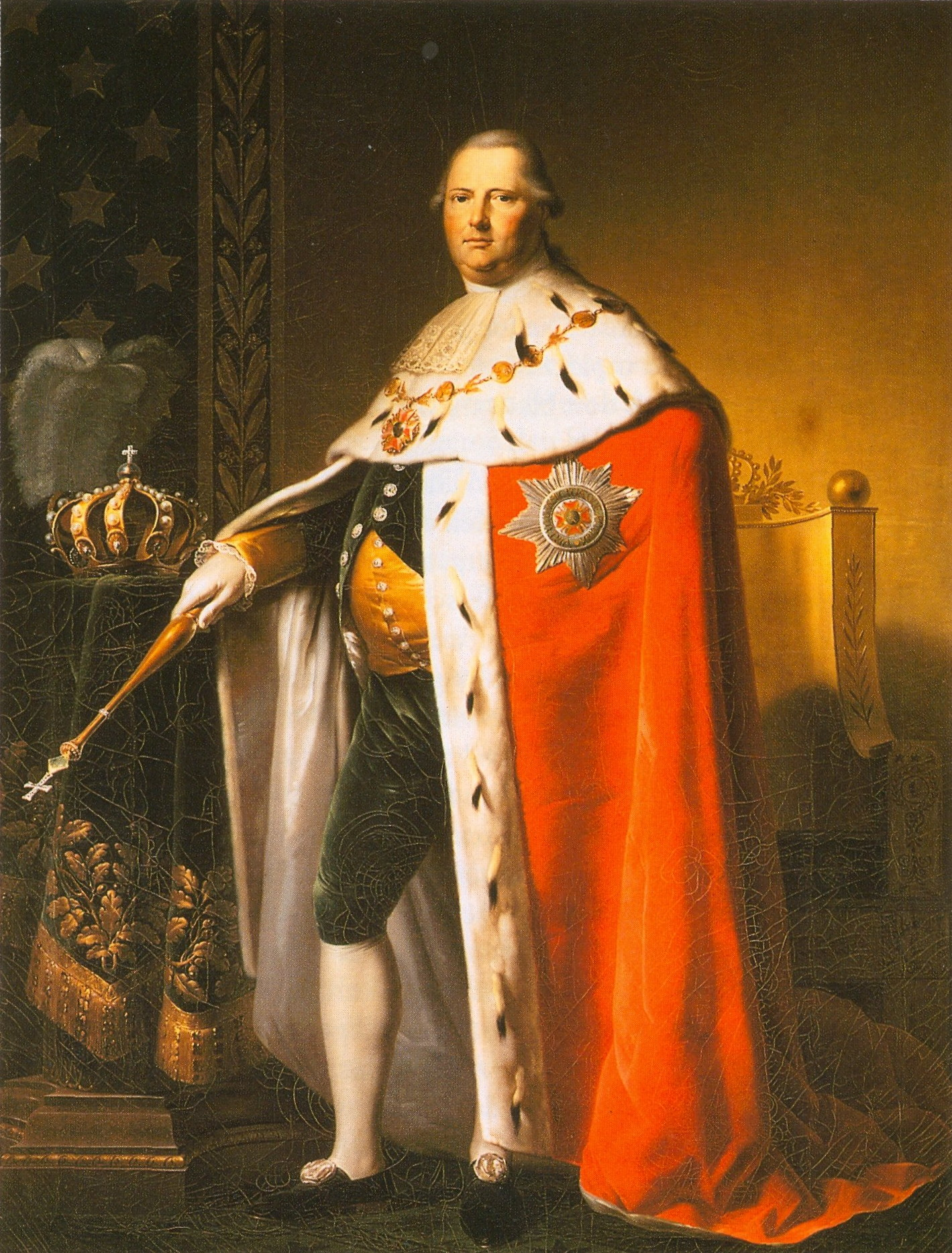
Frederick I of Württemberg

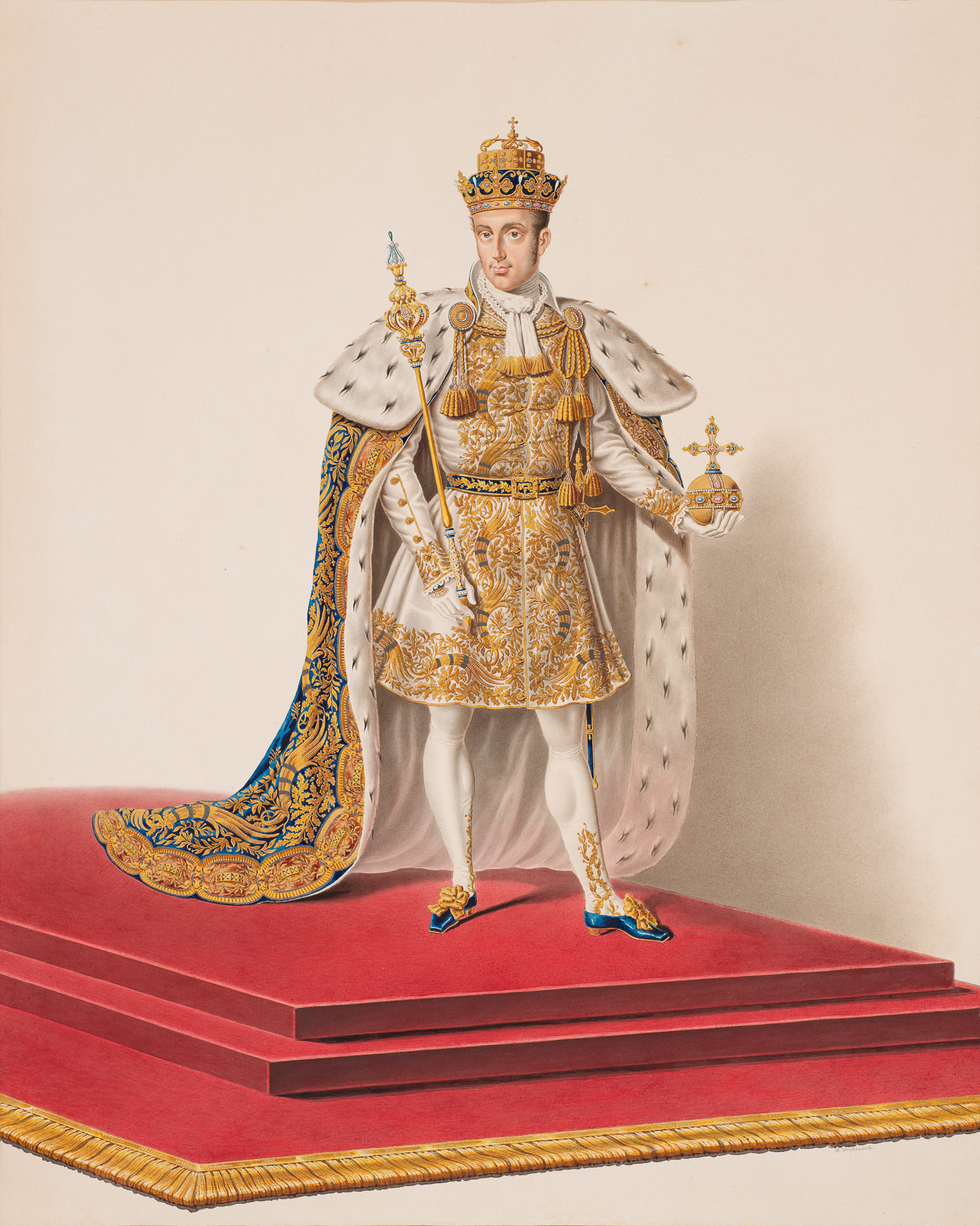
Emperor Ferdinand I as King of Lombardy-Venetia

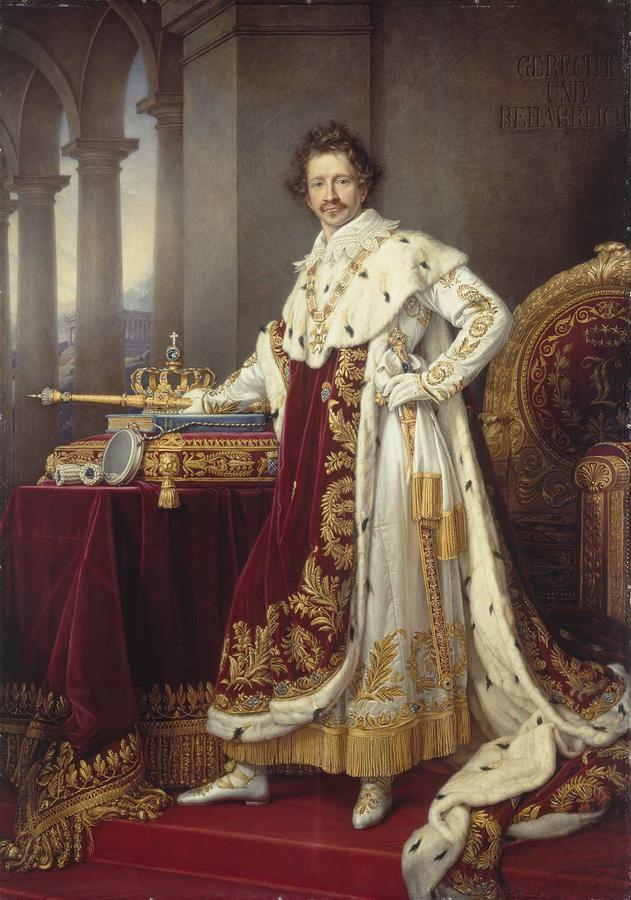
Ludwig I of Bavaria

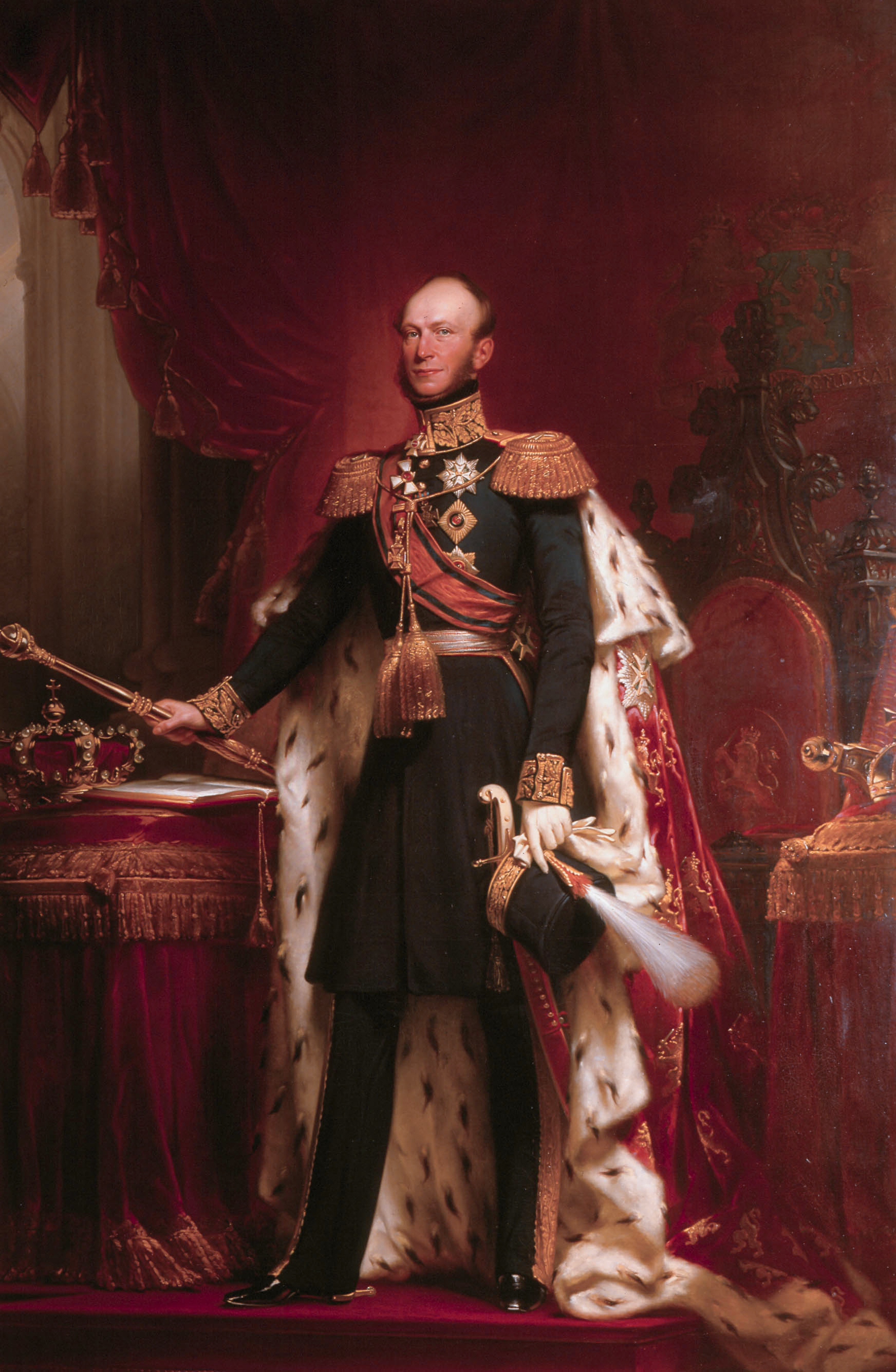
William II of the Netherlands

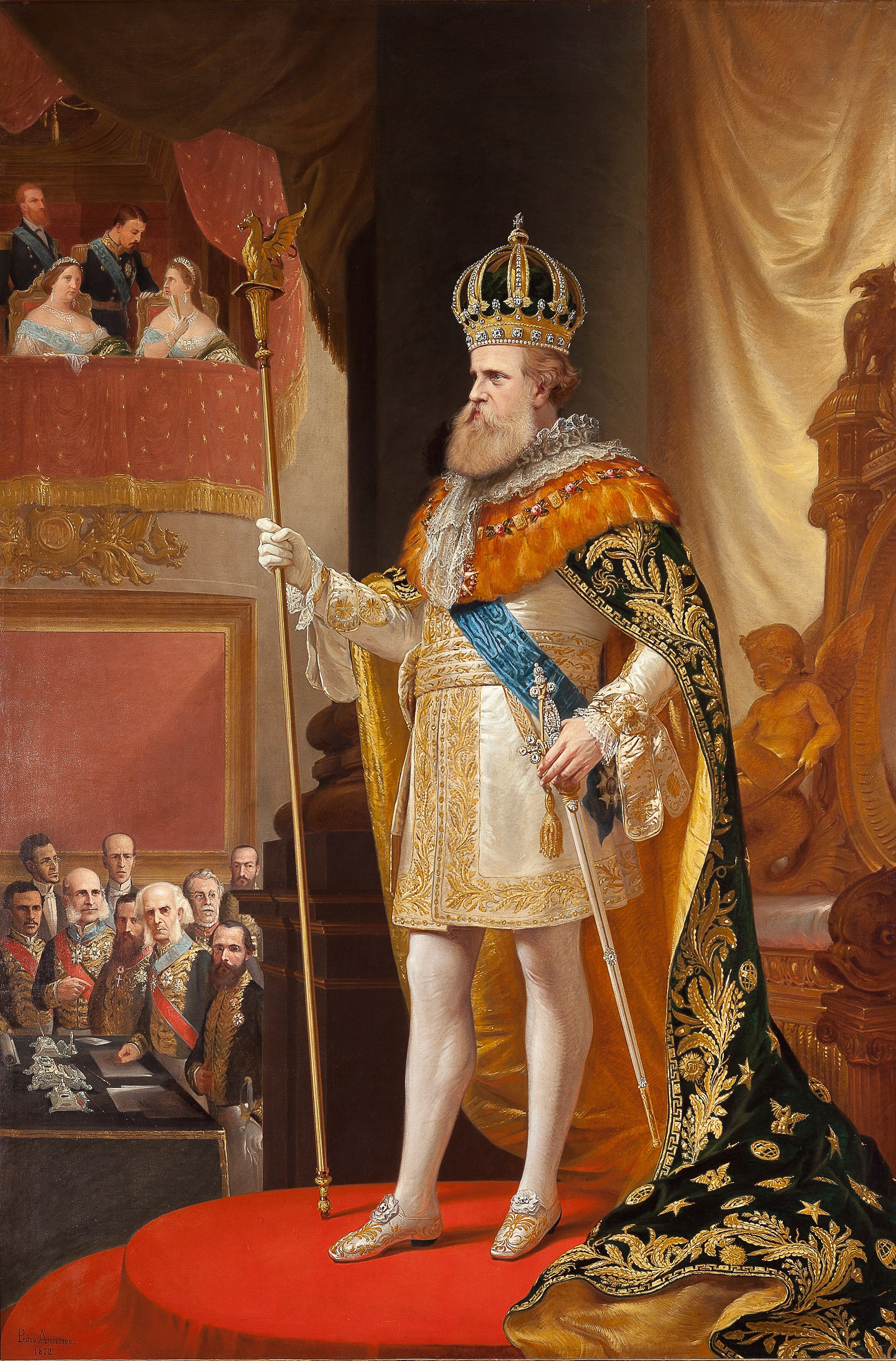
Pedro II of Brazil

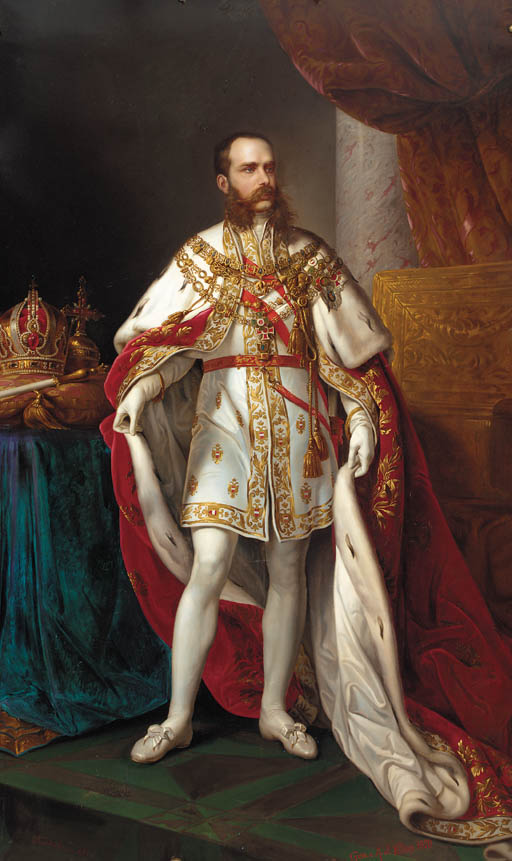
Franz Joseph I of Austria

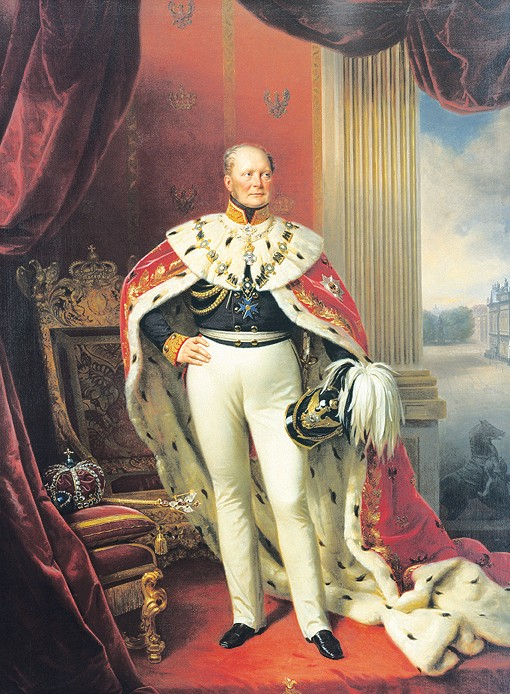
Frederick William IV of Prussia

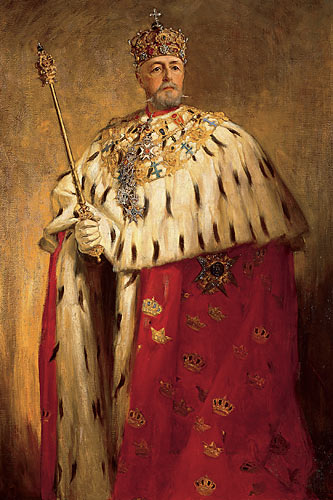
Oscar II of Sweden

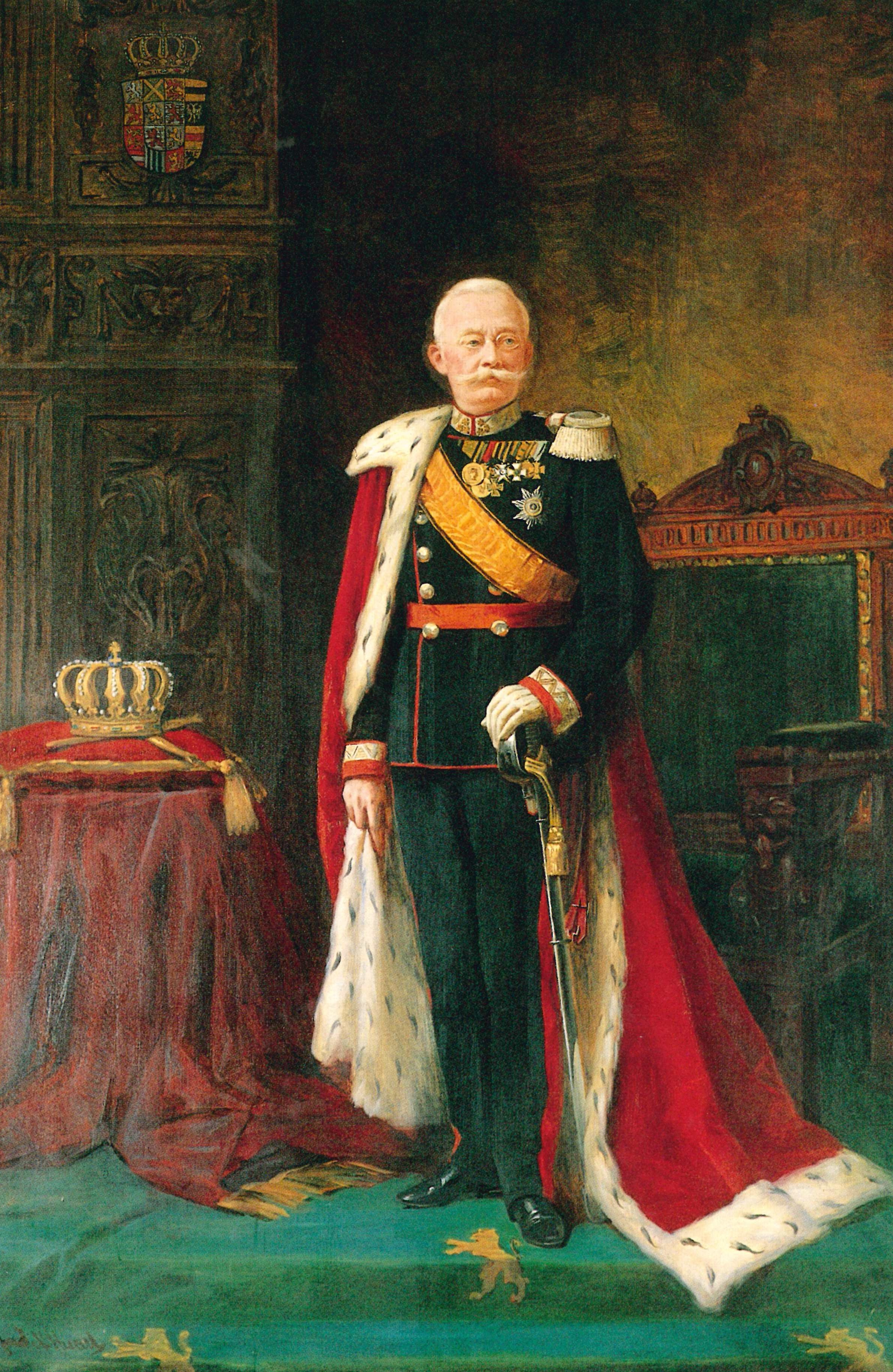
Adolphe, Grand Duke of Luxembourg

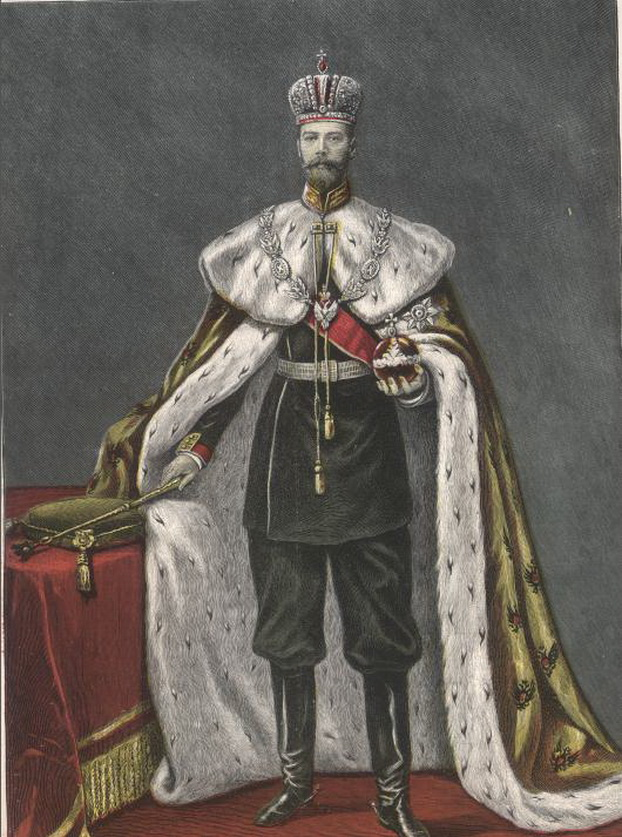
Nicholas II of Russia

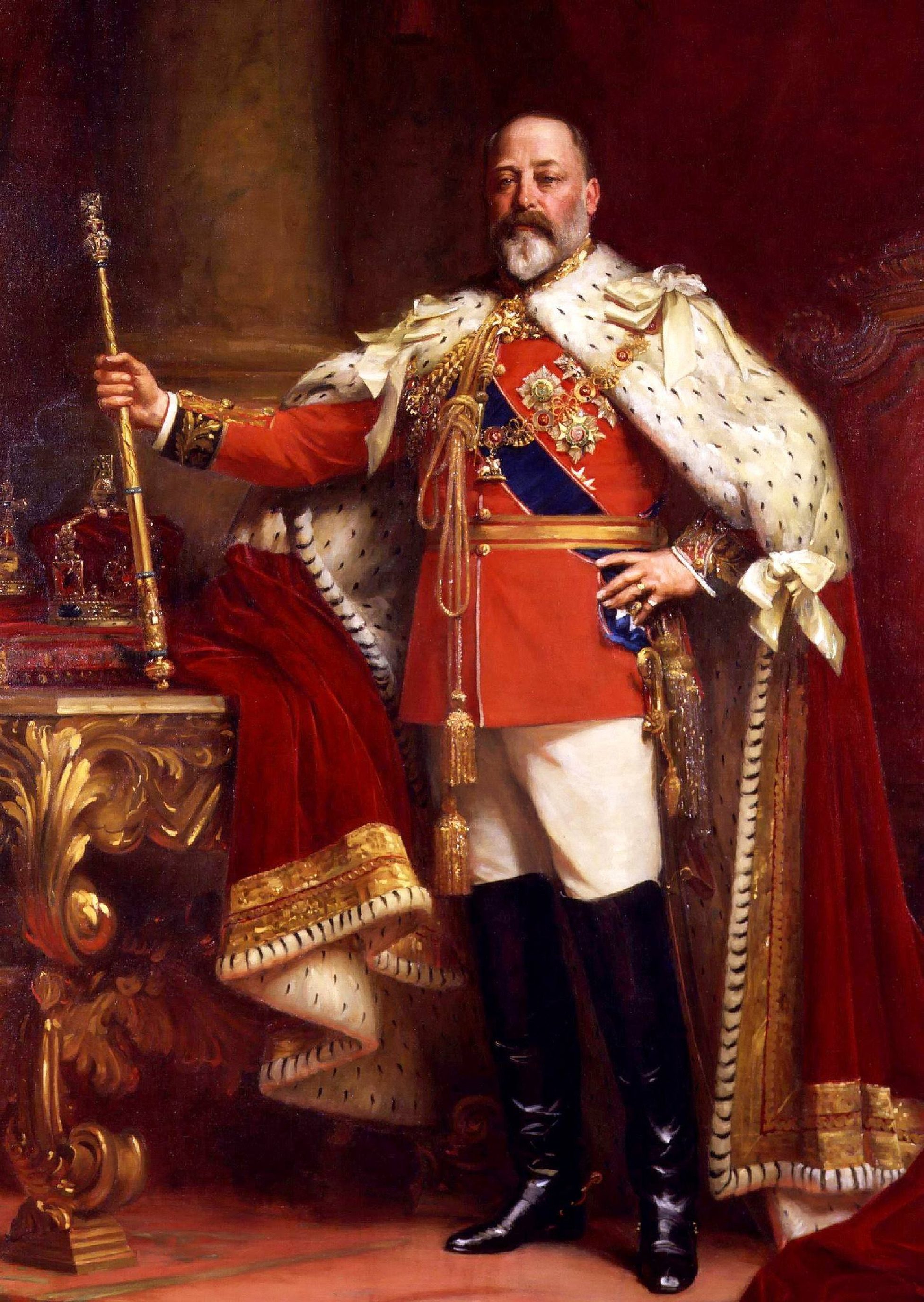
Edward VII

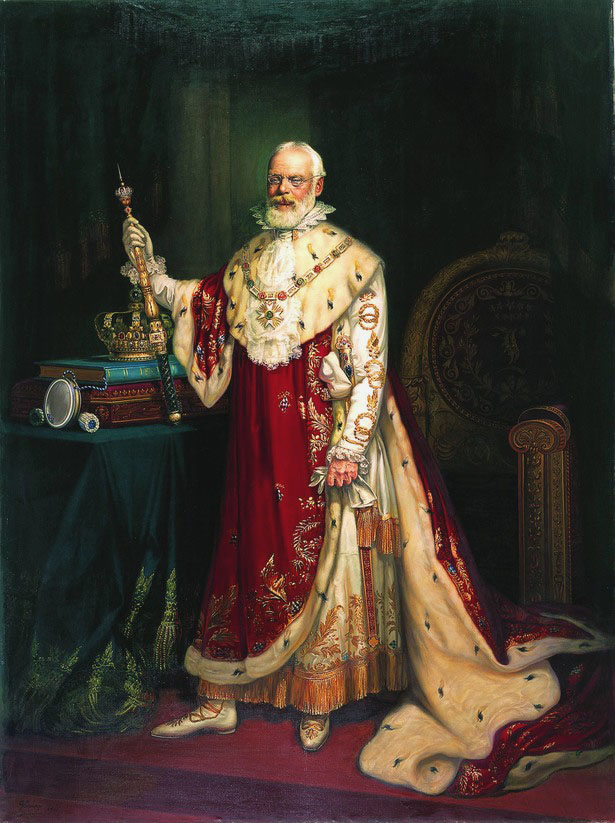
Ludwig III of Bavaria

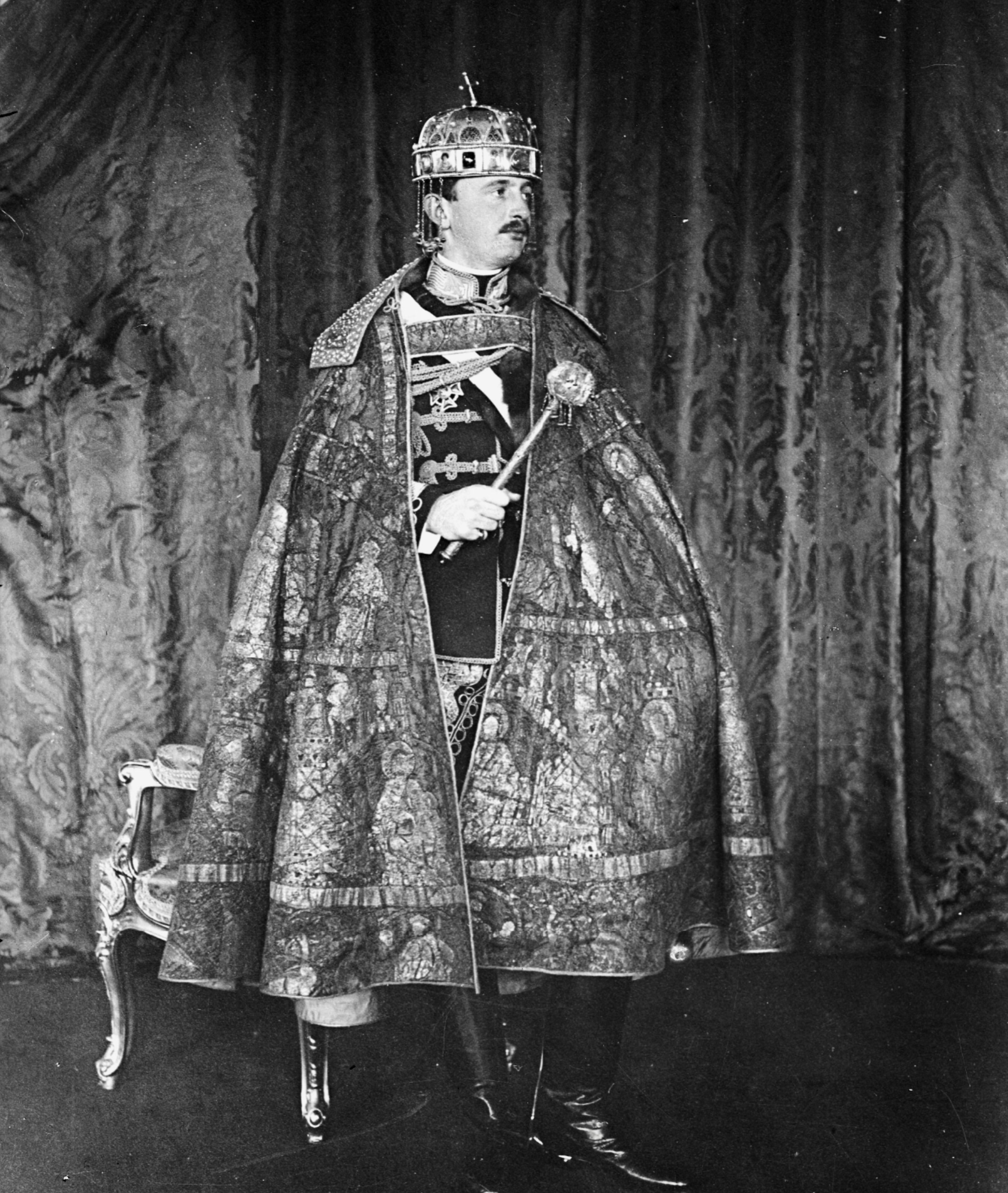
Karl I of Austria

== Bibliography ==
- Ruess, K.H. (red.), Becker, H-J. et al. (1997): Die Reichskleinodien, Herrschaftszeichen des Heiligen Römischen Reiches, Gesellschaft für Staufische Geschichte, Göppingen, ISBN 3929776081
- Elzinga, E. (1990): Theater van staat: oude tradities rond een jong koningschap, Rijksmuseum Paleis Het Loo, Apeldoorn
- Fasseur, C. (1998): Wilhelmina, de jonge koningin, Balans, Amsterdam
- Fillitz, H. (1954): Die Insignien und Kleinodien des Heiligen Römischen Reiches, Schroll, Wenen - München
- Grijpma, Dieuwke (1999): Kleren voor de elite. Nederlandse couturiers en hun klanten 1882-2000, Balans, Amsterdam, ISBN 9050184472
- Kubin, E. (1991): Die Reichskleinodien, Ihr tausendjähriger Weg, Wenen - München, ISBN 3850023044
- Seipel, H.W. (2004): Nobiles Officinae. Die königlichen Hofwerkstätten zu Palermo zur Zeit der Normannen und Staufer im 12. und 13. Jahrhundert, Skira, Milaan, ISBN 3854970765

== See also ==
- Koningsmantel (Netherlands)
- Swedish coronation robes
- Mantle of Luís I
- Mantle of João VI
- Robe
- Blessed Mantle of the Prophet Muhammad
