= Mantle (surname) =

Mantle is a surname. Notable people with the surname include:

- Anthony Dod Mantle (born 1955), British cinematographer
- Clive Mantle (born 1957), English actor
- Doreen Mantle (1926–2023), British actress
- Gabe Mantle (born 1975), Canadian drummer
- John Mantle (disambiguation), multiple people
- Kelly Mantle (born 1976), American drag queen
- Larry Mantle (born 1959), American radio host
- Mickey Mantle (1931–1995), American baseball player
- Reggie Mantle, fictional character from Archie Comics
