= Koningsmantel (Netherlands) =

Red velvet robe worn by monarchs of the Netherlands at their inaugurations

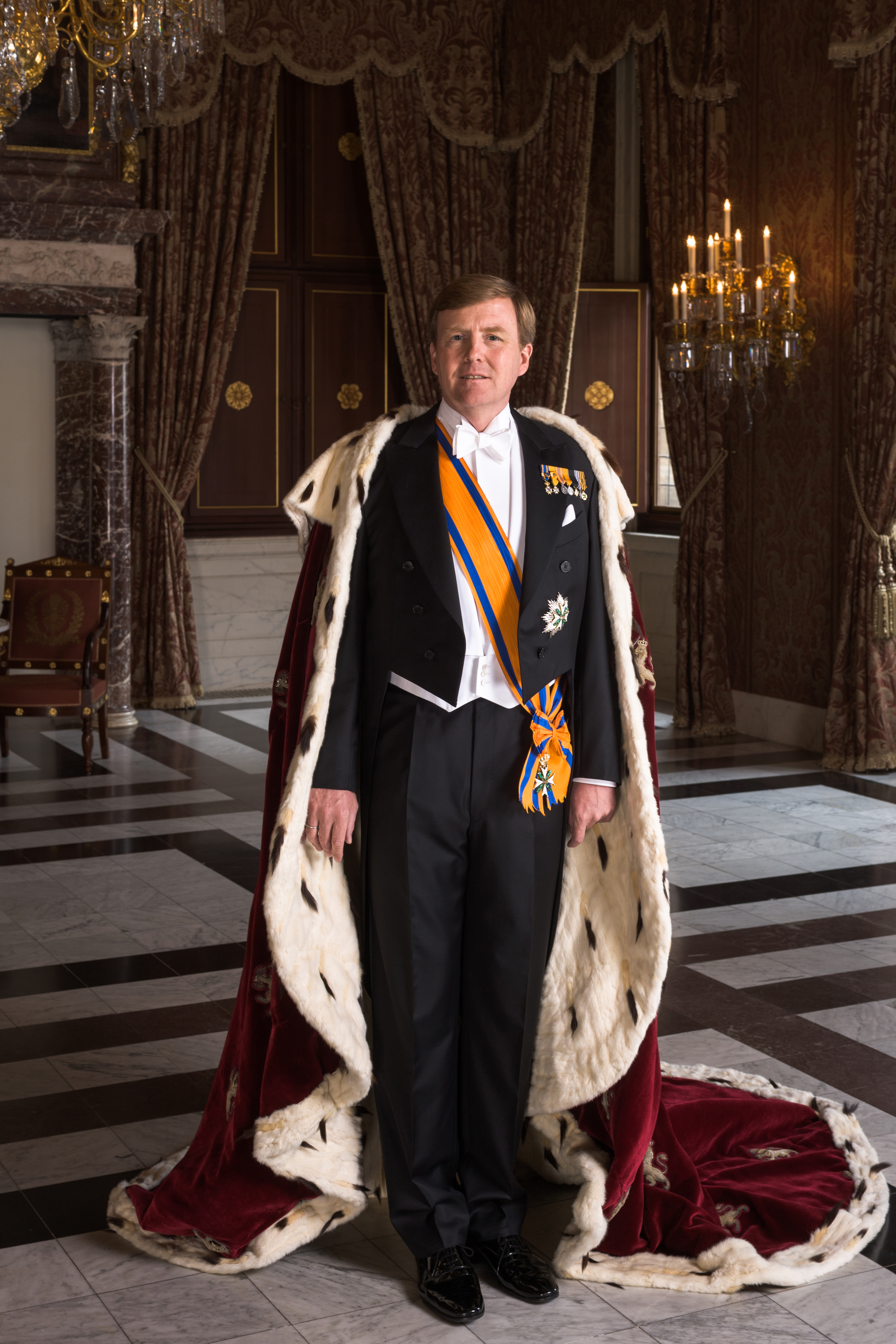
King Willem-Alexander wearing the Dutch royal mantle

The royal mantle (Dutch: Koningsmantel) of the Netherlands is worn only by the Dutch monarch at their inauguration. As Dutch monarchs are never crowned, it is more appropriate to speak of a royal mantle than a coronation mantle.

It is a red velvet trimmed coat lined with white ermine and 83 Dutch lions embroidered with gold threads. It was last worn at the inauguration of King Willem-Alexander.

== Bibliography ==
- Elzinga, E. (1990): Theater van staat: oude tradities rond een jong koningschap, Rijksmuseum Paleis Het Loo, Apeldoorn
- Fasseur, C. (1998): Wilhelmina, de jonge koningin, Balans, Amsterdam
- Grijpma, Dieuwke (1999): Kleren voor de elite. Nederlandse couturiers en hun klanten 1882-2000, Balans, Amsterdam, ISBN 9050184472

== See also ==
- de:Königsmantel Wilhelms I. der Niederlande
