= Amsterdam riots =

Amsterdam riots may refer to:

- 1740 Pachtersoproer
- 1787 Bijltjesoproer
- 1886 Palingoproer
- 1917 Potato riots
- 1934 Jordaanoproer
- 1975 Nieuwmarkt riots
- 1980 Vondelstraat riots
- 1980 Amsterdam coronation riots
- 1997 Battle of Beverwijk
- 2021 Dutch curfew riots
- November 2024 Amsterdam riots

== See also ==
- Amsterdam stabbing attack
