= Dolf Toussaint =

Photographer (b. 1924, d. 2017)

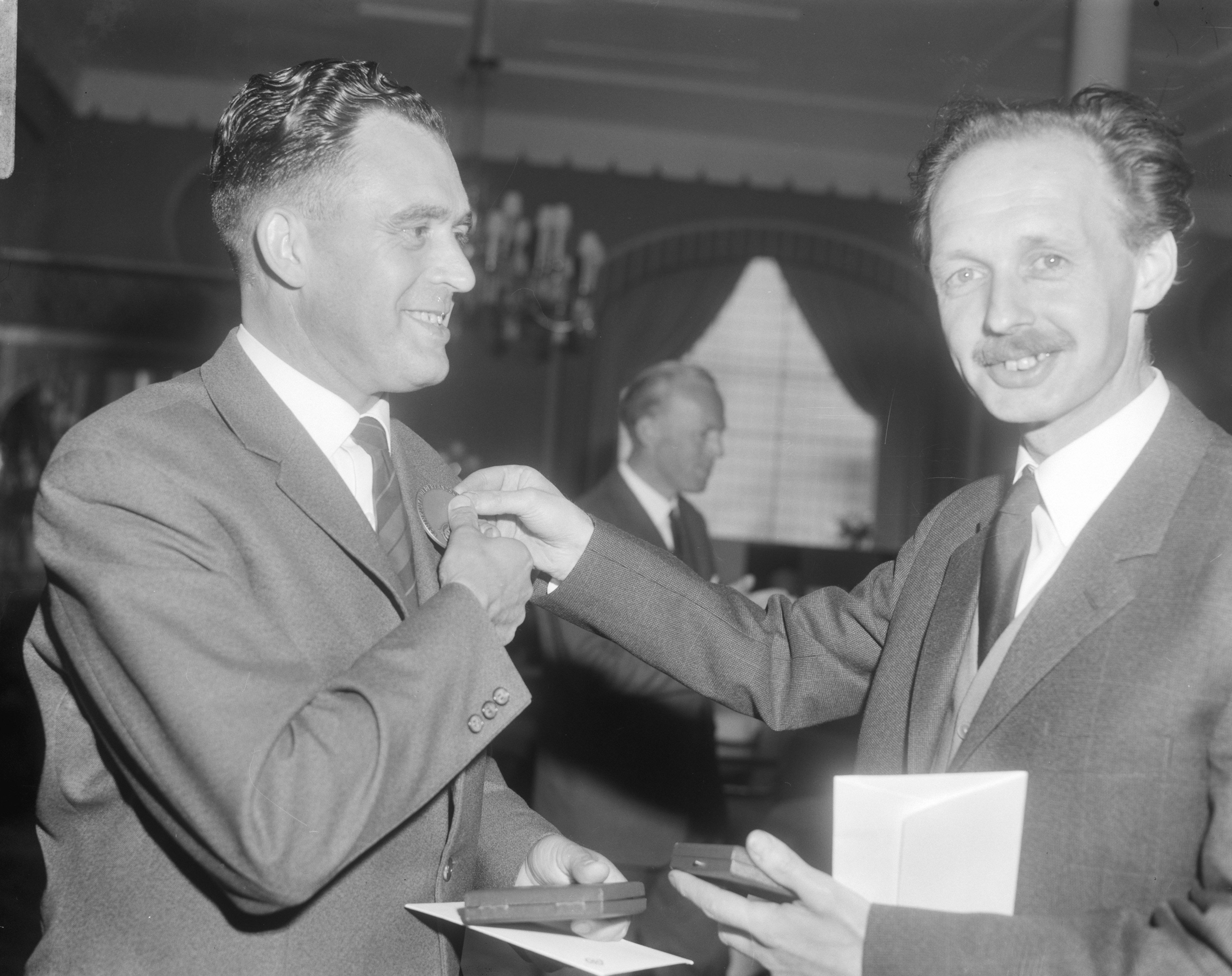
- Journalist H.A. Bollen (left) and Dolf Toussaint receive the ANWB prize (1966)
- Born: December 15, 1924
- Died: June 13, 2017 (aged 92)
- Notable work: De Jordaan (1965); Zone industrielle (1984)

Dolf Toussaint (1924-2017) was a Dutch photographer best known for his work documenting daily life in Amsterdam, particularly the changes in the De Jordaan neighborhood in the 1960s, as well as documenting the social unrest in the late 70s and early 80s, such as the Amsterdam coronation riots. He is also known for documenting proceedings at The Hague parliament in a dynamic manner, when the standard at the time were staged portraits of politicians.

Since his death in 2017, much of his work is held at the Amsterdam City Archives.
