= 2021 Dutch curfew riots =

Riots against COVID-19 restrictions in the Netherlands

- Part of the COVID-19 protests in the Netherlands
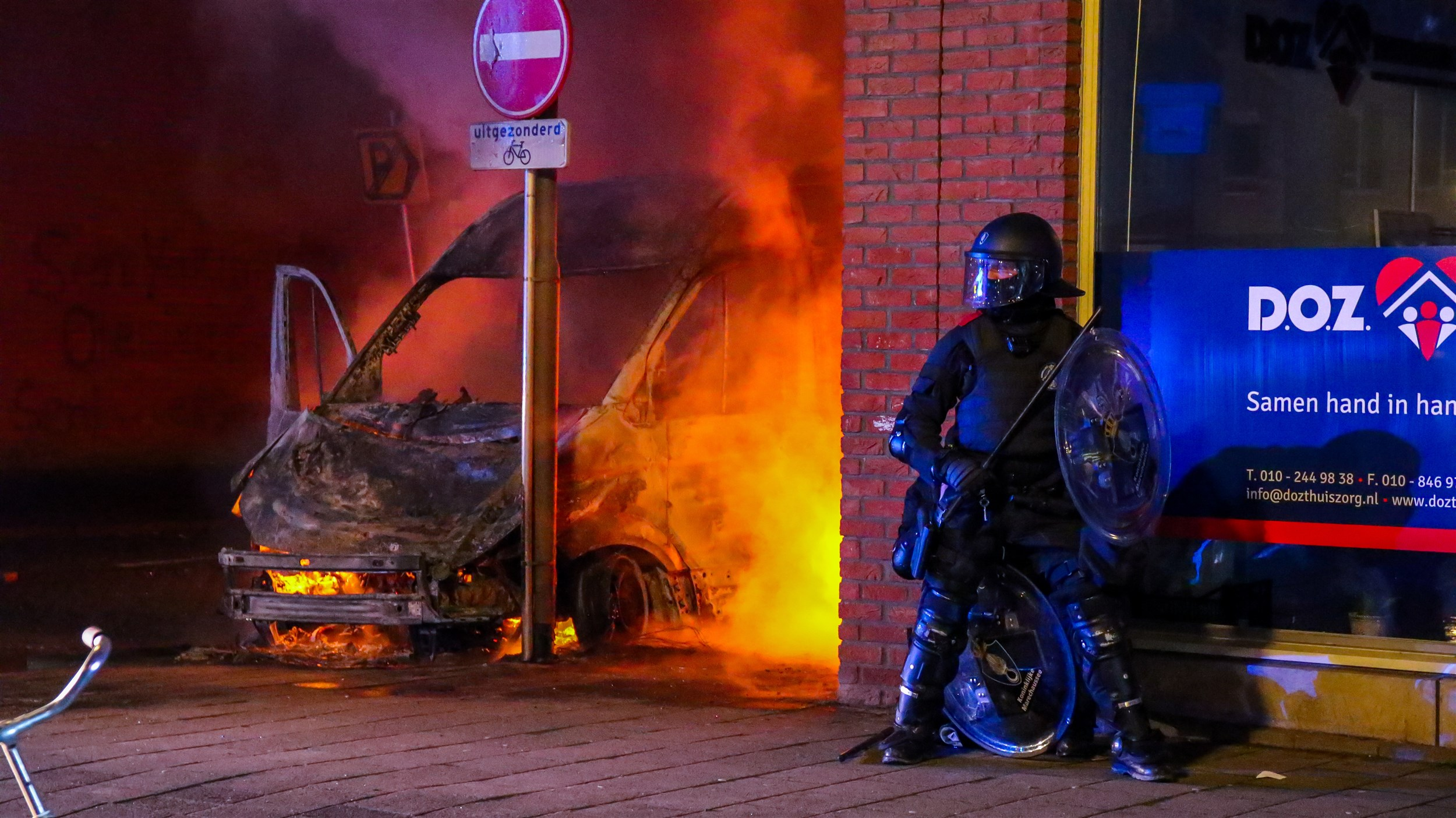
- A van set on fire during the riots in Rotterdam on 26 January 2021
- Date: 23–26 January 2021
- Location: Netherlands
- Caused by: The introduction of a curfew, as part of the COVID-19 prevention measures in the Netherlands; Overall dissatisfaction with restrictions due to the COVID-19 pandemic; Calls to riot spread on social media
- Methods: Rioting; Vandalism; Arson; Looting

Parties
Rioters; Youths; Hooligans; Right-wing radicals; Conspiracy theorists; Anti-lockdown protesters	Law enforcement; National Police Corps; Royal Marechaussee; Local vigilantes; Football supporters; Farmers

Casualties
- Injuries: At least 12 (as of 27 Jan 2021)
- Arrested: 575+ (as of 27 Jan 2021)

The 2021 Dutch curfew riots (Dutch: avondklokrellen) were a series of riots in the Netherlands that initiated as protests against the government's COVID-19 prevention measures and specifically the 21:00–4:30 curfew that was introduced on 23 January 2021. The police have described the riots as the worst in the country since the 1980 coronation riots.

== Background ==
The proposal to introduce a nationwide curfew to curb the spread of the coronavirus disease 2019 (COVID-19) had been put on the table by the Outbreak Management Team (OMT) as early as September 2020, but did not gain the support of the House of Representatives at the time, because of its strong association with World War II.

Four months later, however, the measure was deemed necessary as the number of infections was not declining fast enough, despite the fact that the Netherlands had been in a full lockdown since 14 December 2020. Furthermore, the more transmissible B.1.1.7 variant of the virus continued to spread across the country, raising concerns for a potential "third wave" of infections.

Demissionary Prime Minister Mark Rutte announced his plan to introduce a 20:30–4:30 curfew at a press conference on 20 January 2021. On 21 January, a majority in the House of Representatives voted to support the proposal, after a motion to shorten the curfew to 21:00–4:30 had been adopted. The curfew would be in effect from 23 January to at least 10 February 2021. The curfew was lifted on 28 April 2021 and has not been reinstated since then.

Non-violent protests against the government's COVID-19 prevention measures had taken place on several occasions prior to the announcement of the curfew. However, on 24 January 2021, illegal demonstrations against the curfew in Amsterdam and Eindhoven escalated into violent riots in response to police interventions. Calls to riot were subsequently spread on social media, leading to riots in other places as well.

== Timeline ==
Places in the Netherlands where rioters clashed with the police, as of 26 January 2021

=== 23 January ===
During the first night of the curfew, the police issued 3,600 fines for being outside after 21:00 without a valid reason. Anti-lockdown protesters gathered in Amersfoort, Rotterdam, IJmuiden and Stein to demonstrate.

On Urk, a former island in the province of Flevoland, groups of youths began to riot in protest against the curfew. The rioters vandalised police cars, and threw stones and fireworks at police officers. Later that evening, a COVID-19 testing site of the Municipal Health Service (GGD) was set on fire. Two suspects have subsequently been arrested.

=== 24 January ===
On 24 January in the afternoon, hundreds of protesters gathered on Museumplein in Amsterdam, despite the fact that Mayor Femke Halsema, the chief police officer and the chief public prosecutor had prohibited the demonstration. The police used water cannons and police dogs to disperse the crowd, in response to which the protesters began throwing firework bombs towards police officers.

Similarly, in Eindhoven, rioters – who had come to the city centre to protest against the lockdown measures – attacked the police by throwing stones, golf balls, fireworks and knives. They also set vehicles on fire and looted a supermarket in the city's central station. According to ProRail, hundreds of thousands of euros in damage was inflicted to the railway station.

In the evening, riots also took place in Enschede, Helmond, Roermond, The Hague, Tilburg and Venlo. In Enschede, rioters attempted to break the windows of the local hospital, Medisch Spectrum Twente. More than 300 people were arrested.

=== 25 January ===
150 people were arrested during the night from 25 to 26 January in Amsterdam and Rotterdam. Shops were looted and vandalized. The cities of Den Bosch, Zwolle, Amersfoort, Alkmaar, Hoorn, Gouda, Haarlem, and Veenendaal experienced troubles, including cars being burned and police attacked with stones.

=== 26 January ===
Den Bosch, Sittard-Geleen, Stein and Capelle aan den IJssel issued an emergency decree for the upcoming night. Beek and Echt-Susteren will have an emergency decree until the 10th of February, which will allow the police to do stop-and-frisk without reason. Zwolle declared an emergency order, which is one step below an emergency decree in Dutch law. Dutch police designated Den Bosch, Almelo en Haarlem as potential hotspots. The Ikazia Hospital in Rotterdam also advised its patients not to come during the evening hours, as police designated the nearby Zuidplein as a potential hotspot.

The riots that took place on 26 January were less heavy than the previous days. Despite some small riots in Amsterdam, Rotterdam and Hilversum, and some disturbances in The Hague, Schijndel and Julianadorp, the situation in these six cities and villages was under control within about an hour.

Many cities also saw massive support coming from their locals. Cities such as Maastricht, saw its hardcore fanbase of its local football club, the angel side, gather as a reaction to the threats made by supposed rioters. A couple hundred supporters marched through the city, eventually making their way to the city centre to make a statement: "we will not tolerate destruction and looting". Most of them went home around 21.00 to adhere to the curfew rules.

=== After 26 January ===
On 27 January, there were no major riots, only small disturbances in The Hague and Rotterdam. In Rotterdam a theatre was set on fire.

Apart from a relatively large group of youths who were shooting fireworks in Tiel, there were no more riots or disturbances reported throughout the Netherlands as of 28 January.

On 31 January, protests against the curfew were held in Amsterdam and Apeldoorn. There were no major riots, but dozens of people were arrested after the police had ended the demonstrations.

== Reactions ==
Demissionary Prime Minister, Mark Rutte, told reporters that the recent events "have nothing to do with protests, this is criminal violence and we will treat it as such".

Minister of Finance Wopke Hoekstra said that the riots will not make the government "capitulate to a few idiots". Minister of Justice and Security Ferdinand Grapperhaus said the same. "Apparently small groups find it necessary to riot. But that is not because of the corona policy, because you don't have to loot a shop for that", he said. Grapperhaus added that the police and Royal Marechaussee are cracking down on the rioters. They will be subject to summary judgment and can face unconditional prison sentences.

MPs Geert Wilders and Jesse Klaver, of the Party for Freedom and GroenLinks respectively, accused each other of inciting the riots. Jesse Klaver accused Geert Wilders of inciting the people to riot, while Geert Wilders demanded Jesse Klaver remove his party's rank and file from the Schilderswijk, a neighbourhood where the riots happened.

The mayor of Eindhoven John Jorritsma gave a statement that: "If we continue down this way, we will head to civil war."

The mayor of Rotterdam Ahmed Aboutaleb released a video in which he directly addressed the rioters. He asked if they felt proud to have destroyed their own hometown and promising them police will crack down on them. He went on to applaud the real heroes of the city's history, that rebuilt the city after the Rotterdam Blitz instead of destroying it. To the entrepreneurs whose establishments were damaged he promised to work together with insurance companies to support them.

A spokesperson of the Dutch armed forces stated that the Royal Netherlands Army has not yet been asked to help curb the riots. However, if the armed forces are asked to help "it would be limited to logistical and material support". Geert Wilders submitted a law proposal enabling the army to assist law enforcement; however, the proposal failed to receive any support aside from his own party, the PVV.

== Photographs (Eindhoven) ==
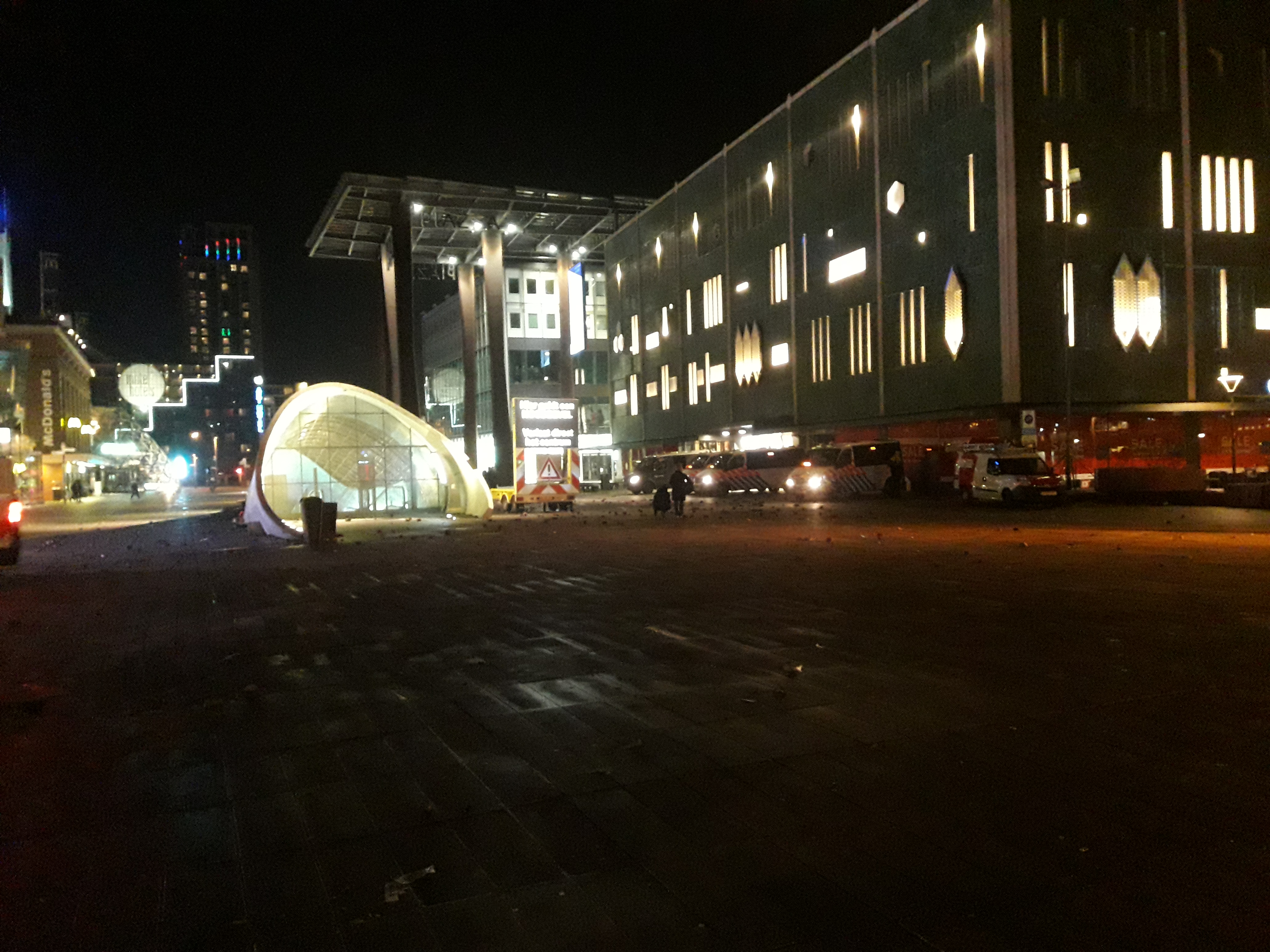
Paving stones pulled out of the ground at 18 September Square

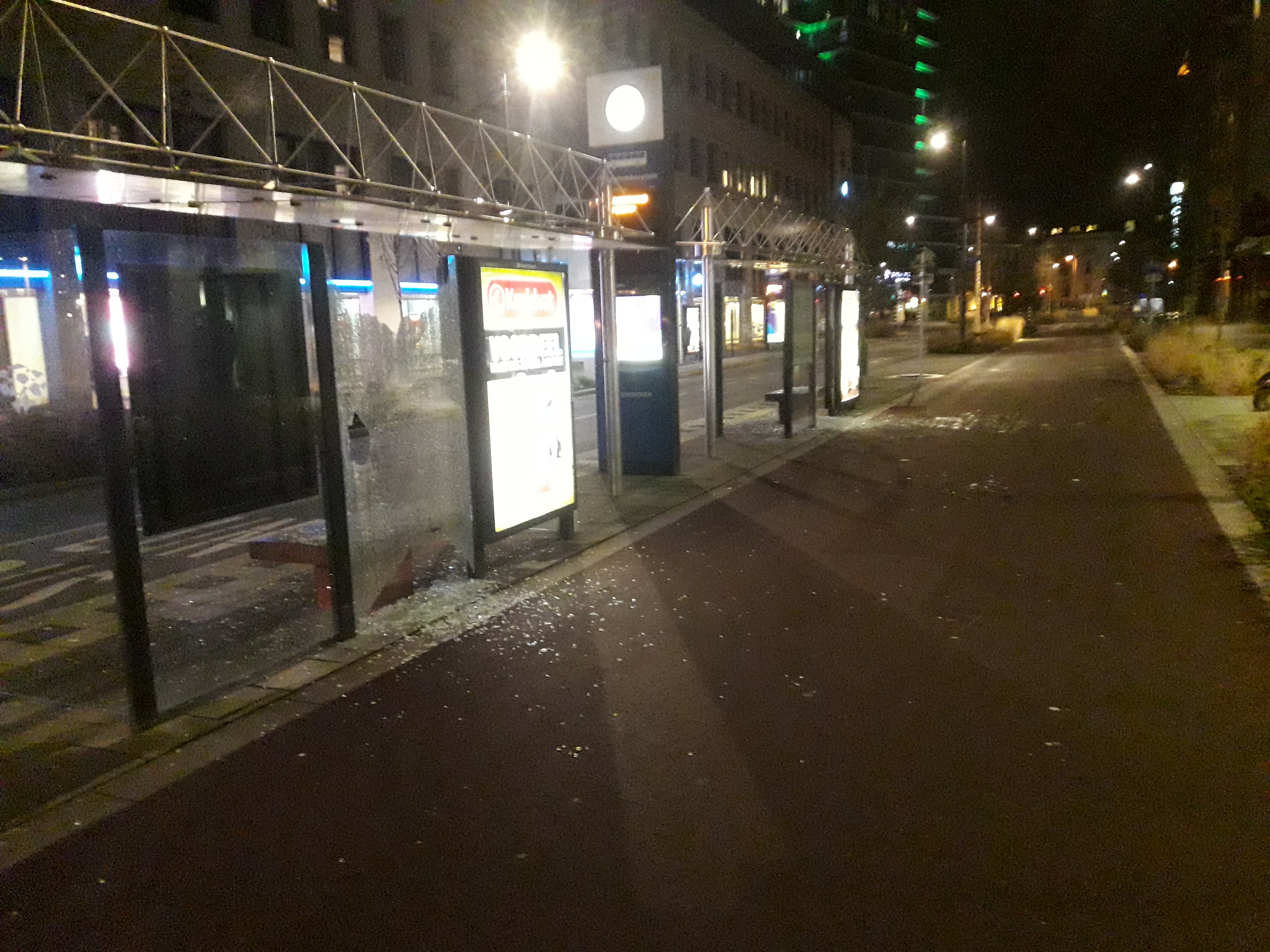
Smashed windows of bus shelters

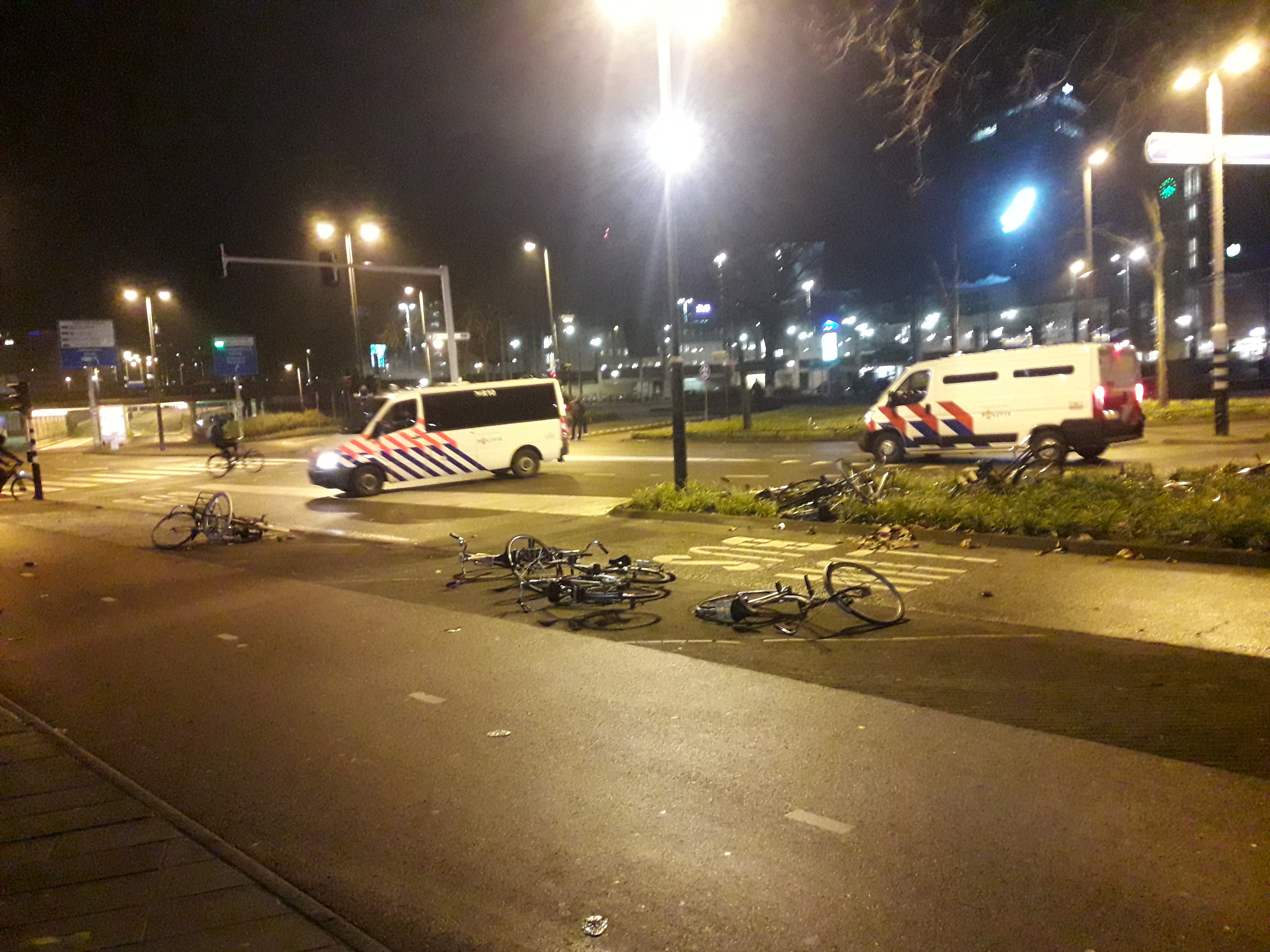
Bicycles thrown on the street

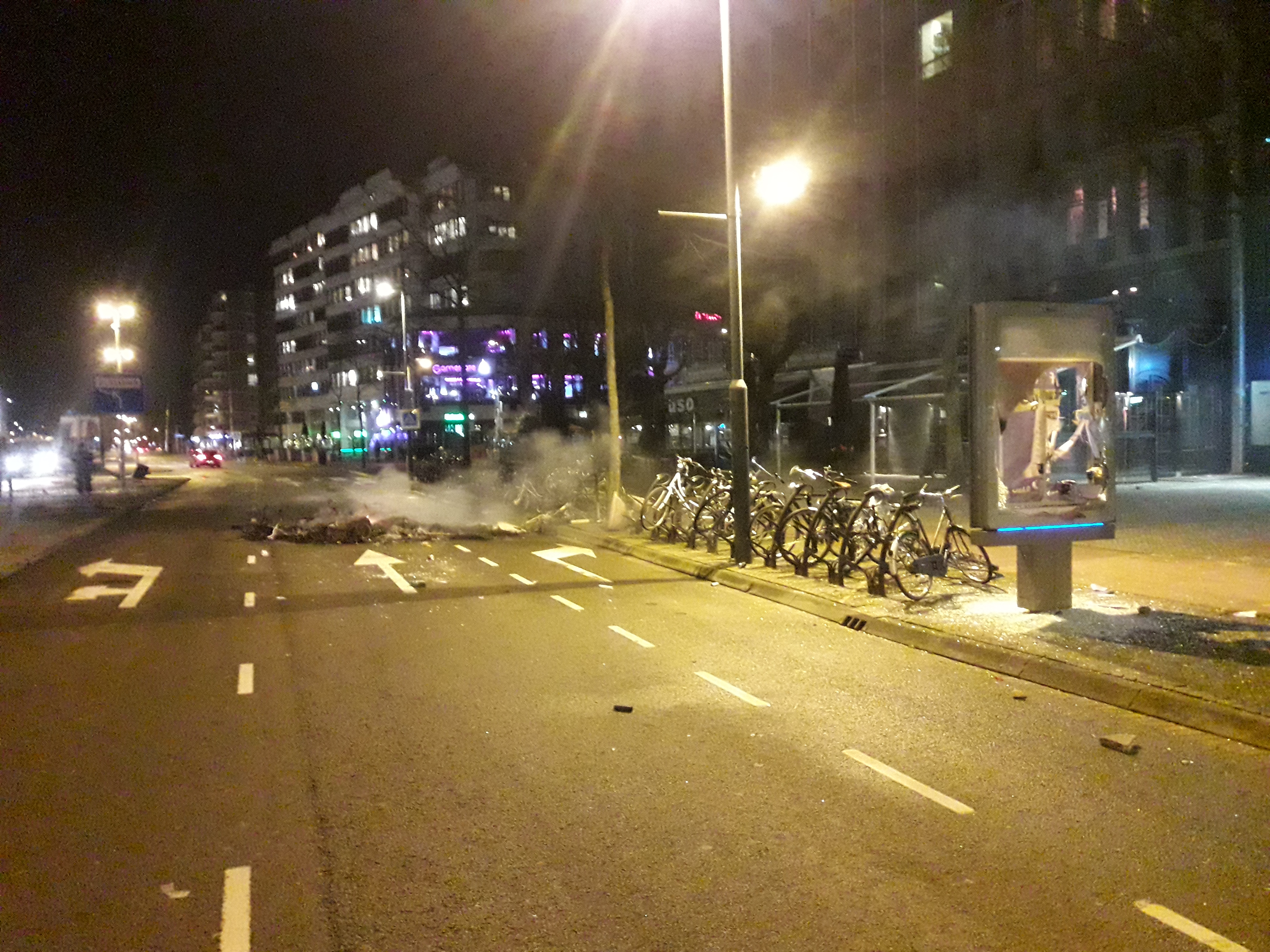
Burned-out bikes

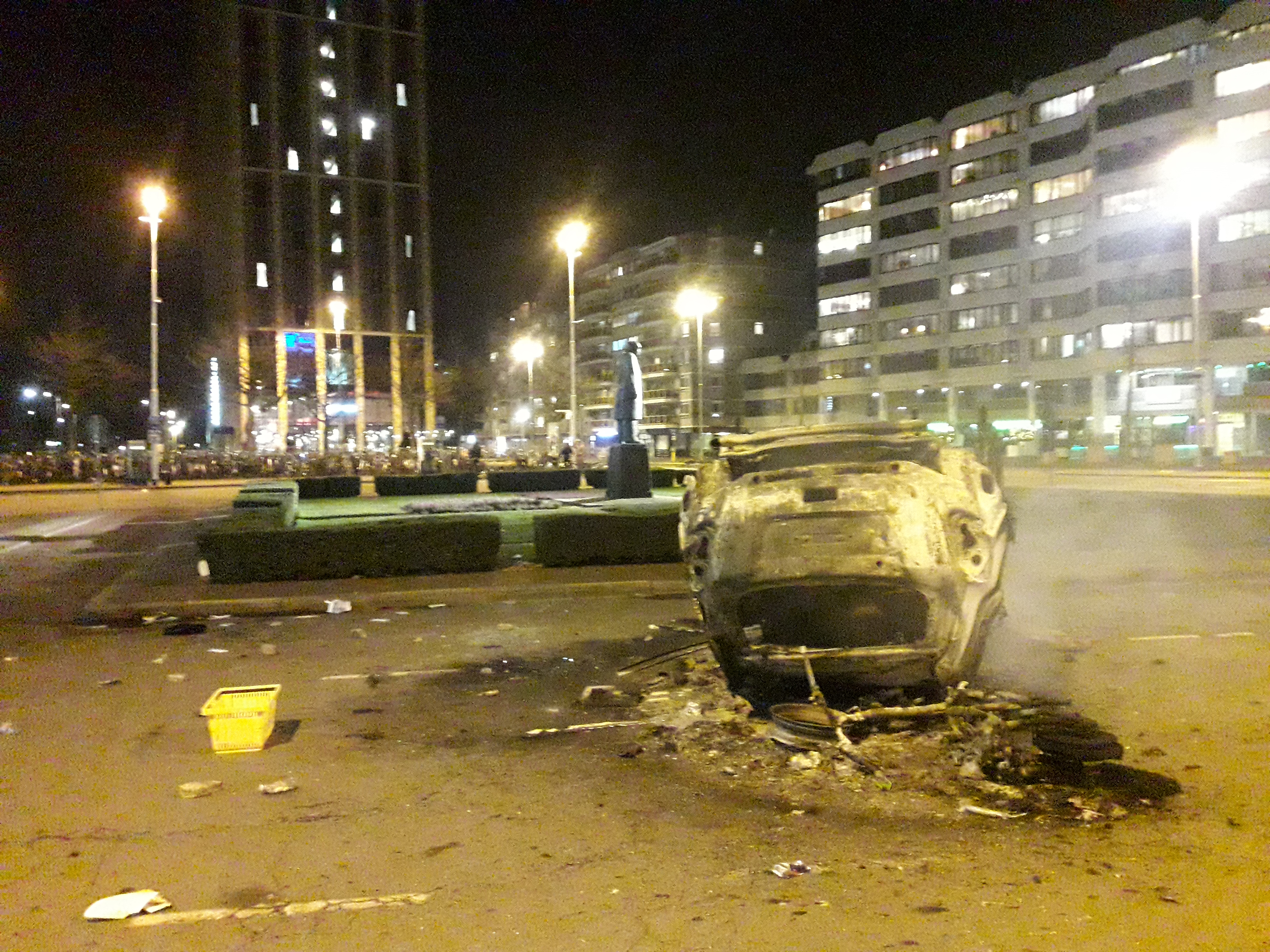
A burned-out car upside down

== See also ==
- Sunset Strip curfew riots (1966)
- Nieuwmarkt riots (1975)
- Vondelstraat riots (1980)
- Amsterdam coronation riots (1980)
