= Curfew riots =

Several riots have occurred after curfews were imposed, including:

- 1988 Tompkins Square Park riot
- 2021 Dutch curfew riots
- Sunset Strip curfew riots
