= Afrikaanderwijk riots =

1972 race riots in Rotterdam

- Turks riot (the Netherlands) Rotterdam olayları (Turkey)
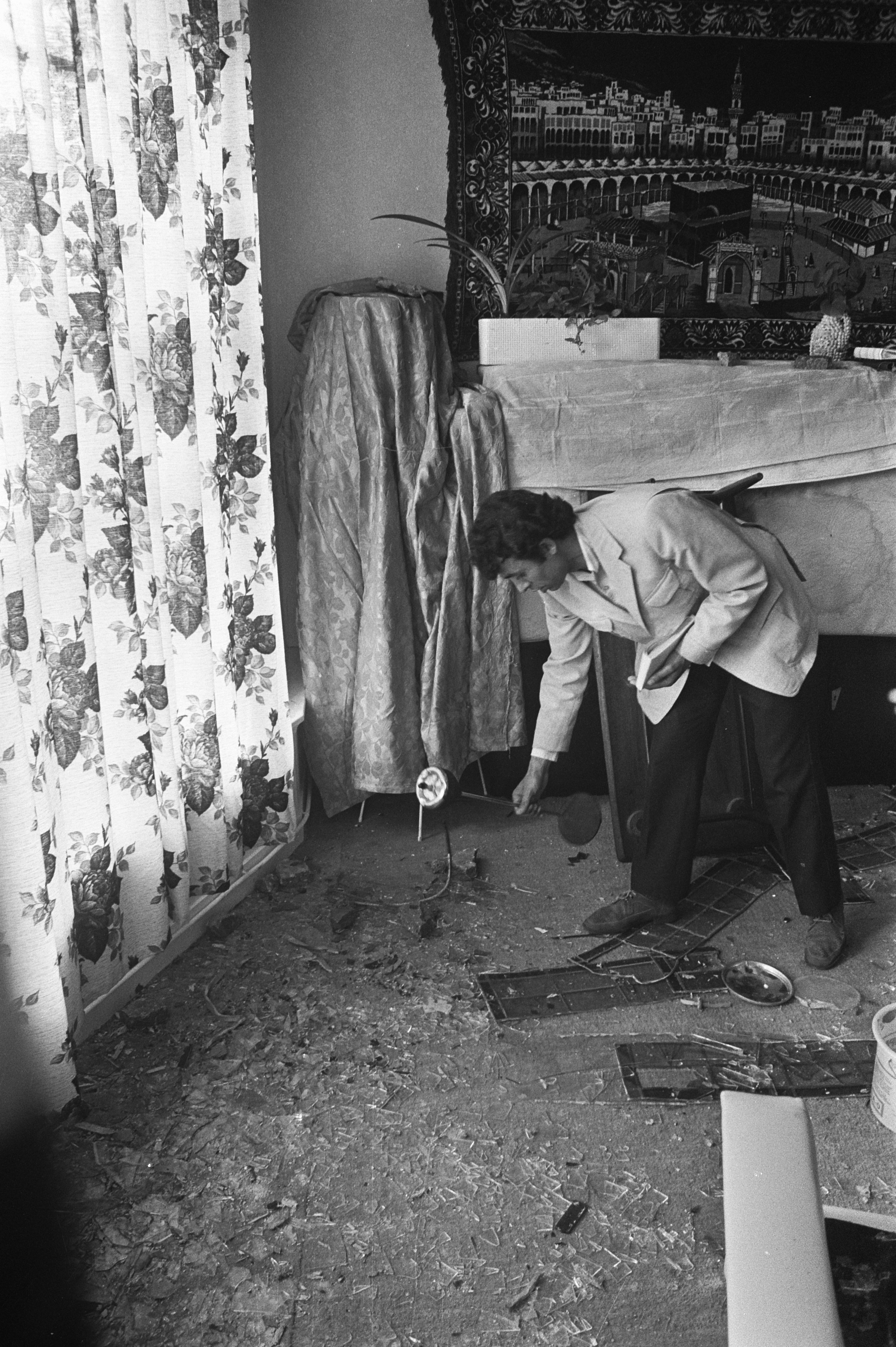
- A Turk and his destroyed property, 1972
- Date: 9–14 August 1972
- Location: Rotterdam
- Caused by: Xenophobia, housing crisis in Rotterdam
- Result: Rotterdam law; Turkish guest workers leave Afrikaanderwijk; 45 Turks were expelled from the country

Casualties
- Injuries: 4 Turks
- Arrested: 82

Afrikaanderwijk riots were the first race riots of their kind in the Netherlands. The riots broke out on 10 August 1972 and continued until 16 August in the Afrikaanderwijk, Rotterdam. While their precise cause is unknown, the clashes are considered to be an example of xenophobic violence by some and economic tensions by others. The clashes are known for creating new laws towards the city's growing immigrant population and destroying the stereotype of Dutch tolerance. In 2019, it gained renewed popularity due to the 2021 Altındağ attack in Ankara, Turkey: Islamist and activist organizations used the riots of 1972 as an example to create empathy for the Syrian refugees in Turkey.

== Name ==
The events are known in the Netherlands under various names, including Turkenrellen (Turks riot), Pogrommerdam, Afrikaanderwijk unrest or Pension riots. In Turkey the incident is known as 'Rotterdam olayları', "Rotterdam events".

== Riots ==
As early as July 1971 a local commission warned about a possible race riot between the Dutch and immigrants; the Dutch in Rotterdam viewed the Turks as a community with a housing advantage compared to them. Dutch natives became increasingly financially able to move to the suburbs, leaving behind disadvantaged lower class households, dissatisfied with the lack of social-cultural homogeneity in the neighbourhood. The growing number of immigrants had increased accommodation prices.

According to Marc Schuilenburg, Professor of Digital Surveillance at the Erasmus School of Law, there was a housing crisis in the neighbourhood, the feeling that the municipality neglected the situation and had no interest in the complaints of the residents, combined with racism and xenophobia. According to the Rotterdam Mayor Thomassen the unrest was racially motivated.

Things escalated on Thursday, 9 August, when a Dutch woman got into a dispute over her rent arrears and was illegally evicted, without court order, from a building owned by a Turkish guesthouse owner, called the 'King of the Turks'. An hour later the police arrived and found three Dutch injured and arrested four Turks. Soon a crowd of five hundred Dutch gathered around the place where the three Dutchmen were wounded. The crowd did not leave all night, and people from other neighbourhoods and cities also joined the quarrel. Although the police tried to push back the rioters, the latter appeared every night with stones and sticks. Turkish guest houses were attacked with firebombs and rocks, the Turkish signs from the shops were removed and replaced by Dutch signs saying "this is the Netherlands". One of the leaders of the riots said that their fury was not directed against the Turks, but against the Turkish hostels:

We did not do anything against these Turkish families, we were only about these hostels. First we took soundings in the neighbourhood as to whether we could get any support. After we had some fifteen people assembled, we gave those Turks a good dressing down. They did not have to leave, oh no, they just had to know their place.

The police remained passive most of the time, and did not know how to react, as this was the first time such an event had taken place in the country. The passivity of the police led to the continuation of clashes until 14 August.

Several guest houses for migrants were closed and 82 people were arrested, 4 Turks were injured, 45 Turks, including 40 workers were expelled and the Dutch government paid compensation to 21 Turks.

In the weeks following the incident, the municipality closed more than forty guest houses because they did not meet the requirements of the building and housing supervision. In October 1972, another 200 boarding houses were closed The riots received media attention from the Dutch and Turkish press. They were covered by English-language newspapers such as The Guardian, The Washington post and The New York Times as well.

== Aftermath ==
The riots drew national attention to the problem of housing for foreign workers, who between 1968 and 1974 were recruited by the Dutch government to do mostly dirty and unpleasant work. Their employers signed contracts with cheap hostels near the centre of big cities.

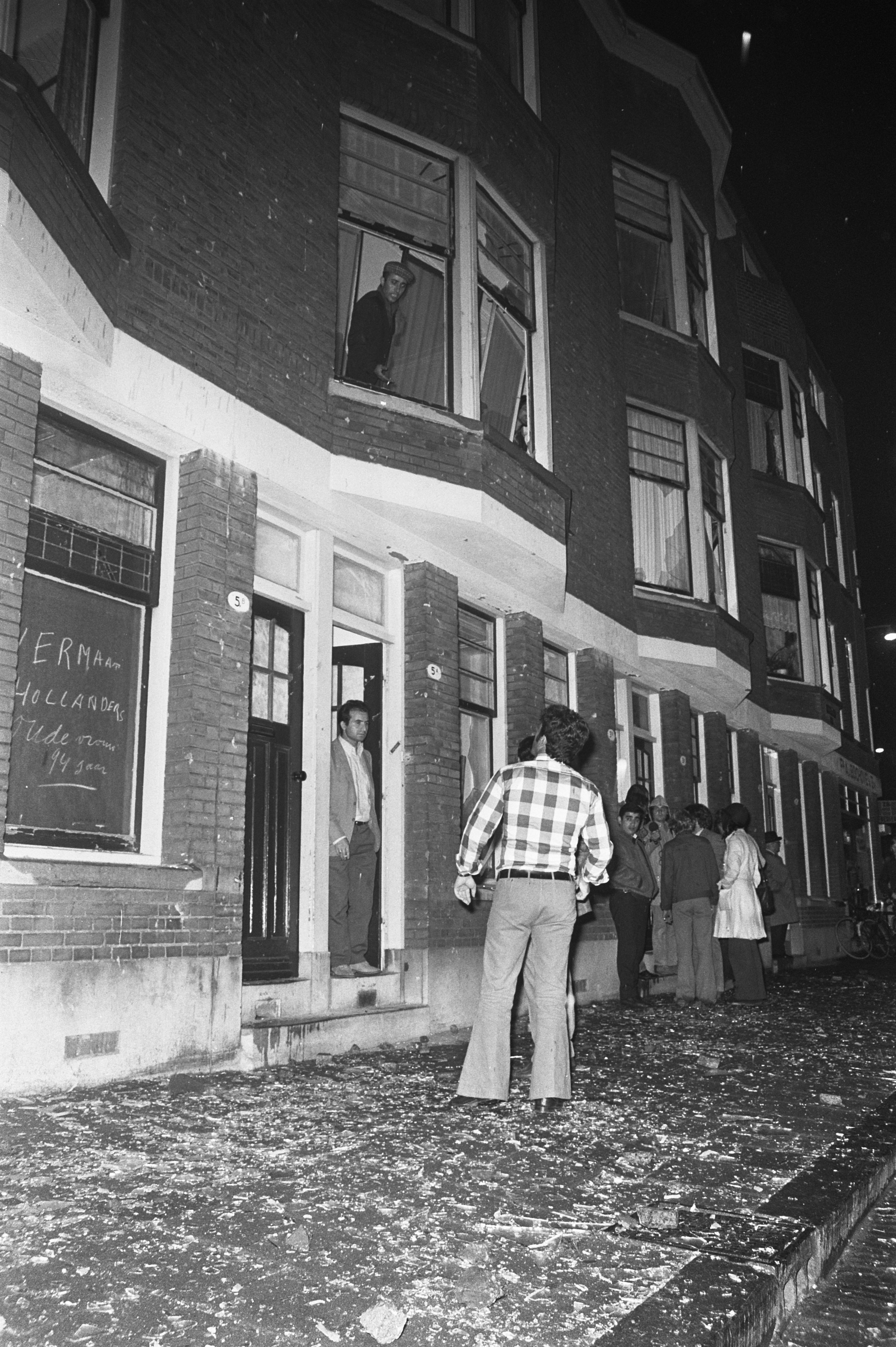
Turks inspect smashed windows.

A decision was made by the Rotterdam municipality according to which people of non-Western origin (Mediterranean, Surinamese, and Antillean people) should not exceed 5% of the population of a given neighbourhood. This percentage was chosen because the presence of these groups in Rotterdam altogether was 5%. As the decision had no basis in law, it was declared void by the Council of State in 1974.

In 2005, the Wet bijzondere maatregelen grootstedelijke problematiek was adopted, also known as the "Rotterdam Law". The law introduced three housing selection tools to improve the quality of life in Rotterdam's neighbourhoods. These tools excluded home seekers based on income, and prioritized home seekers with certain socio-economic features and exclusion of home seekers that recently caused disturbance or with criminal background. According to the new law, which had its precursor in more informal practices since the 1980's, new immigrants were placed in neighbourhoods where less than 16% of the population was of non-Western background.

== In culture ==
Cihad Caner, a Dutch-Turkish artist dedicated his work (Re)membering the riots in Afrikaanderwijk in 1972 or guest, host, ghos-ti to the riots. He interviewed several witnesses and victims. According to him:

The work revolves around a forgotten event: the 1972 riots directed against guest workers in Afrikaanderwijk, a neighbourhood of Rotterdam. It poses questions such as how we remember, the role of subjectivity in shaping our collective memory, and the transformative potential of re-enactment as a means of reawakening the past. Central to this research is a meticulous focus on memory, as it seeks to unravel the subjective nature of individual recollections, recognising that memory is not a fixed entity but rather a fluid and subjective phenomenon. The aim of the work is to highlight contrasting shades and nuances that exist among various individual remembrances of the Afrikaanderwijk riots, allowing for a diverse range of perspectives to be acknowledged and woven together. Reenactments feature as pivotal elements within the project, which not only allows for the recreation and revisitation of the past, but the process of reenactment itself operates as a potent tool for reclaiming forgotten narratives.

Robert de Hartogh, a Dutch photographer, became interested in the Netherlands' Turkish community after the riots. The photographic series Annotations on Afrikaanderwijk (2019) by artist Hannah Dawn Henderson addressed the 1972 clashes, amongst other aspects of Afrikaanderwijk's history.

== Gallery ==
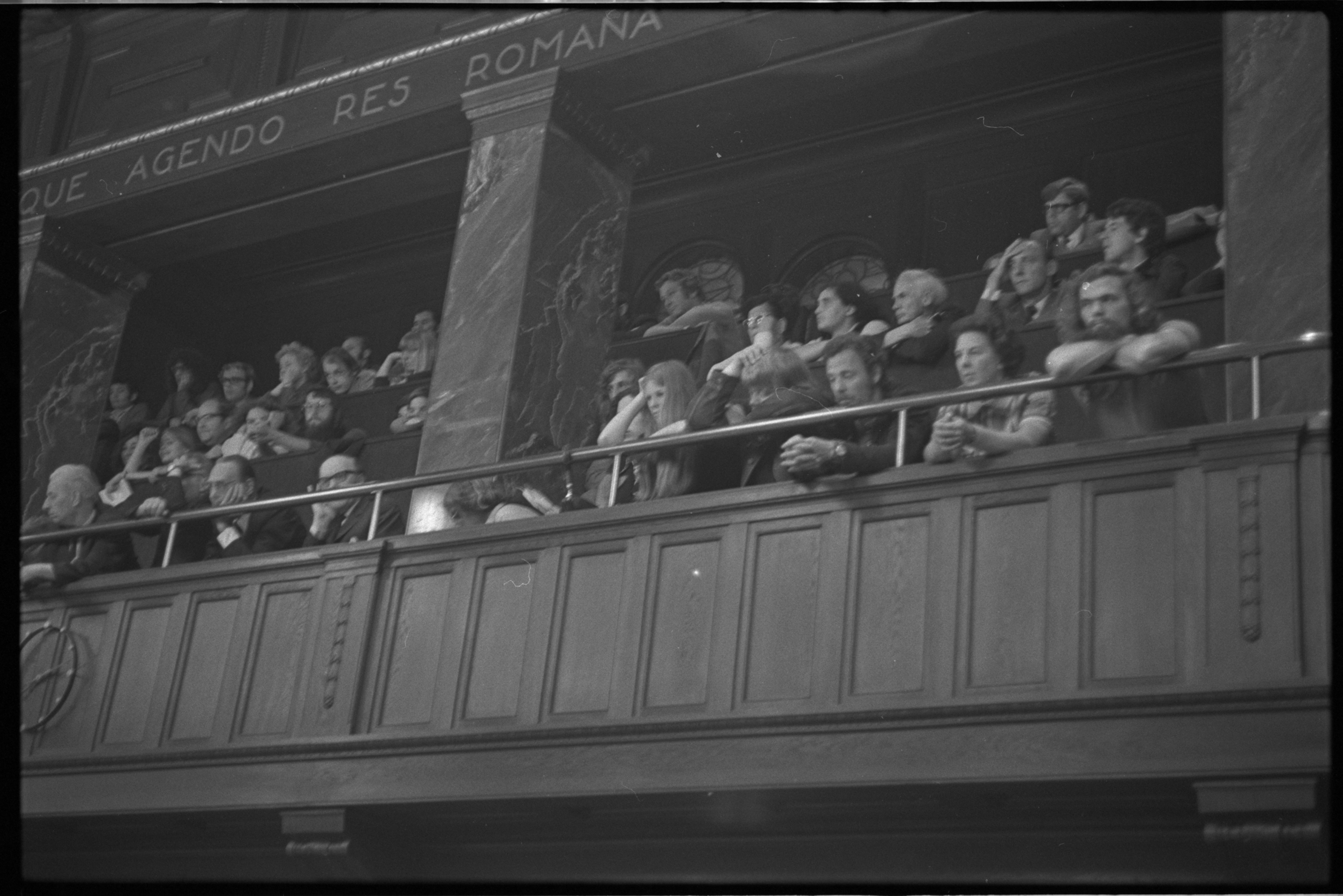
People in the public gallery during the discussion of the riots, 1972

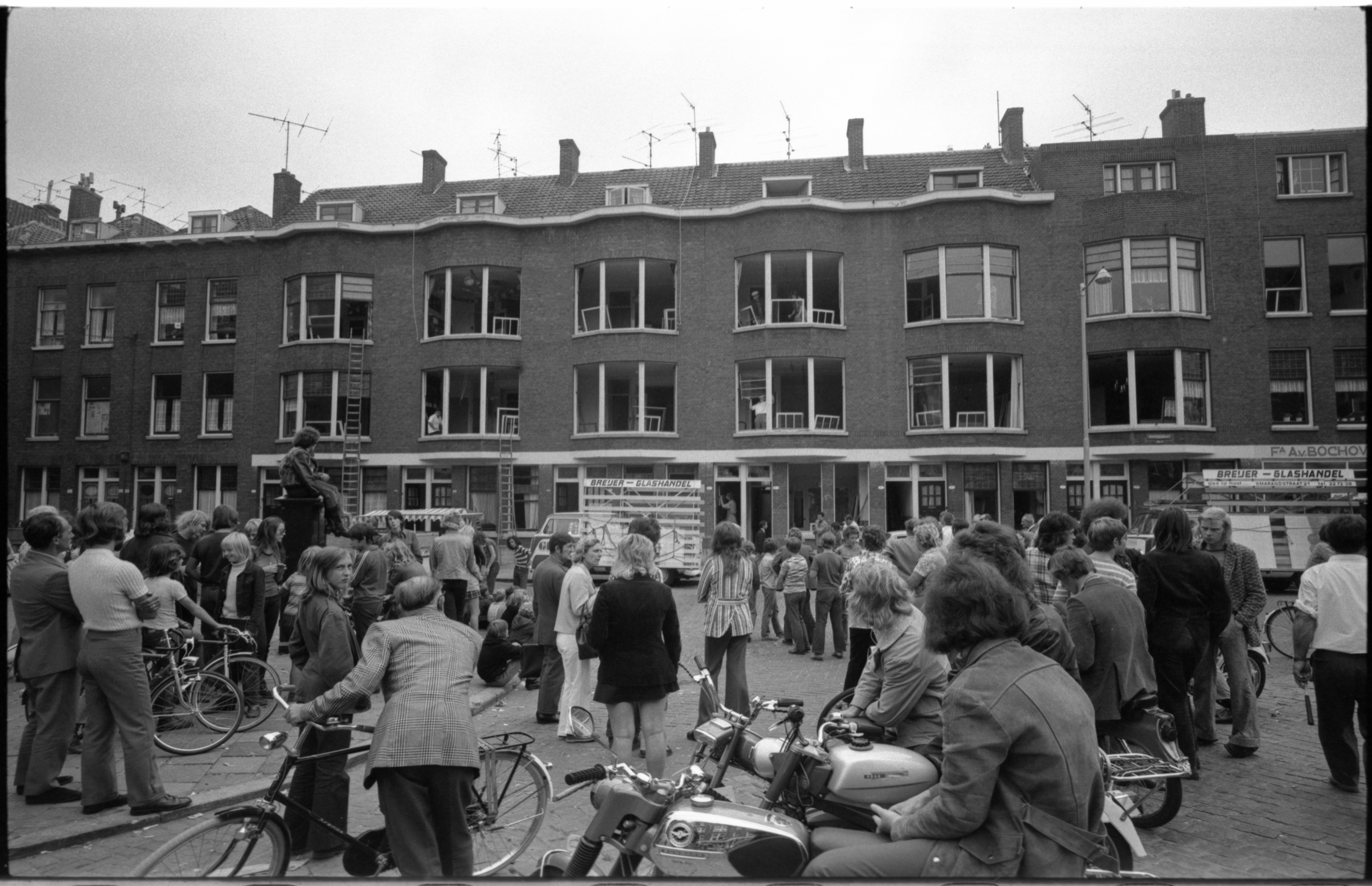
The public watches repaired windows, 1972.

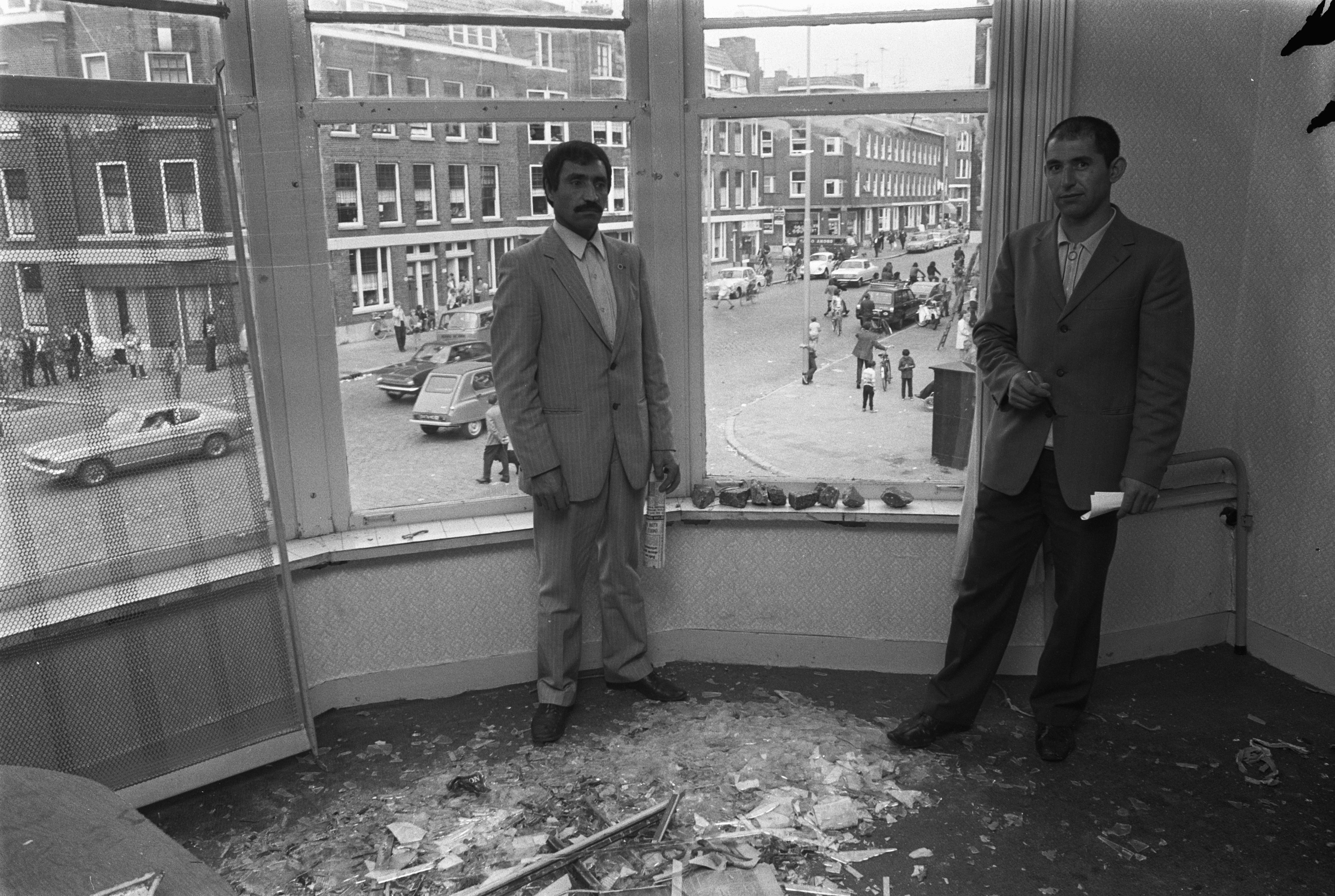
Turks and their destroyed property

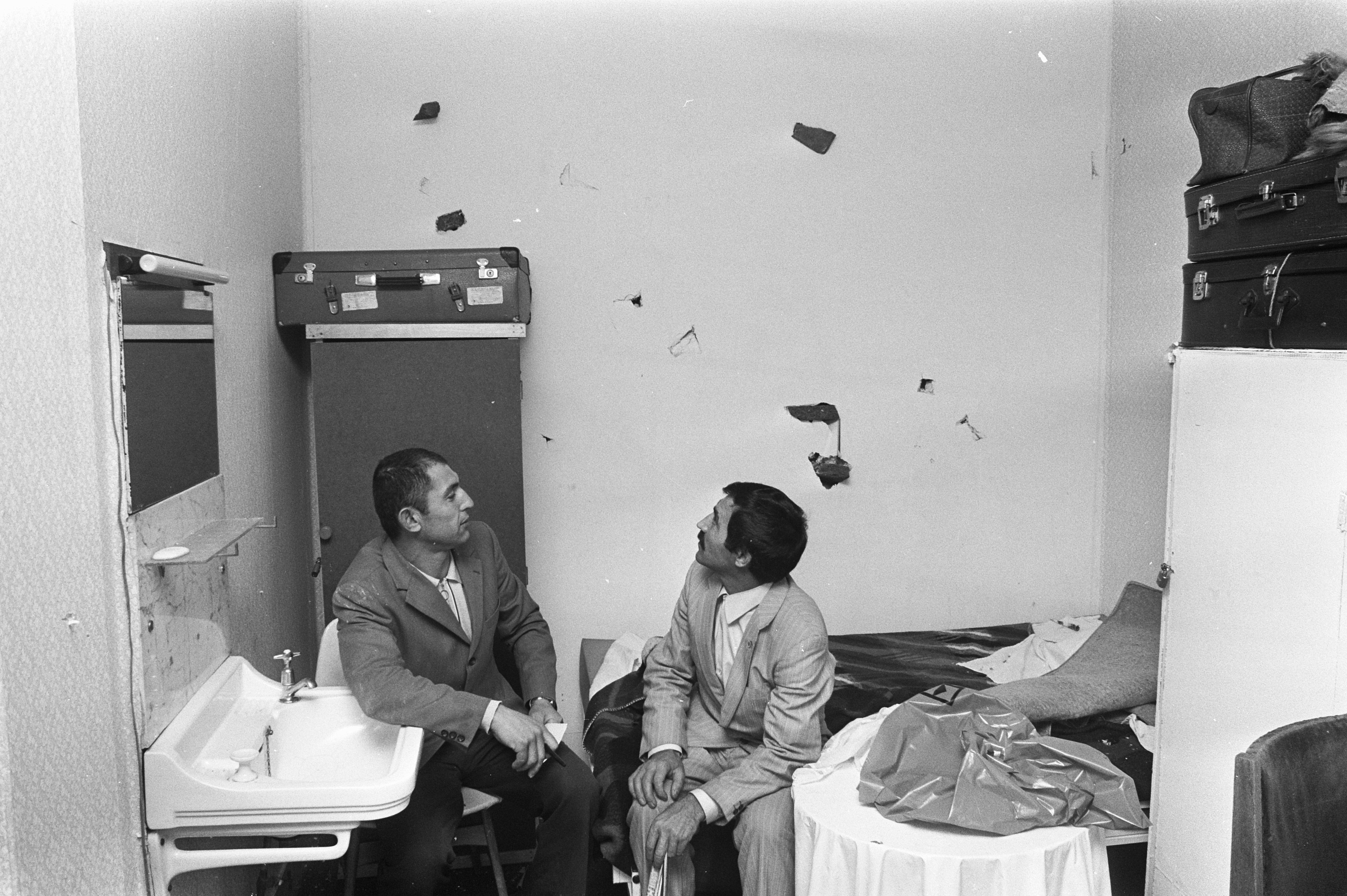
Turks in destroyed houses

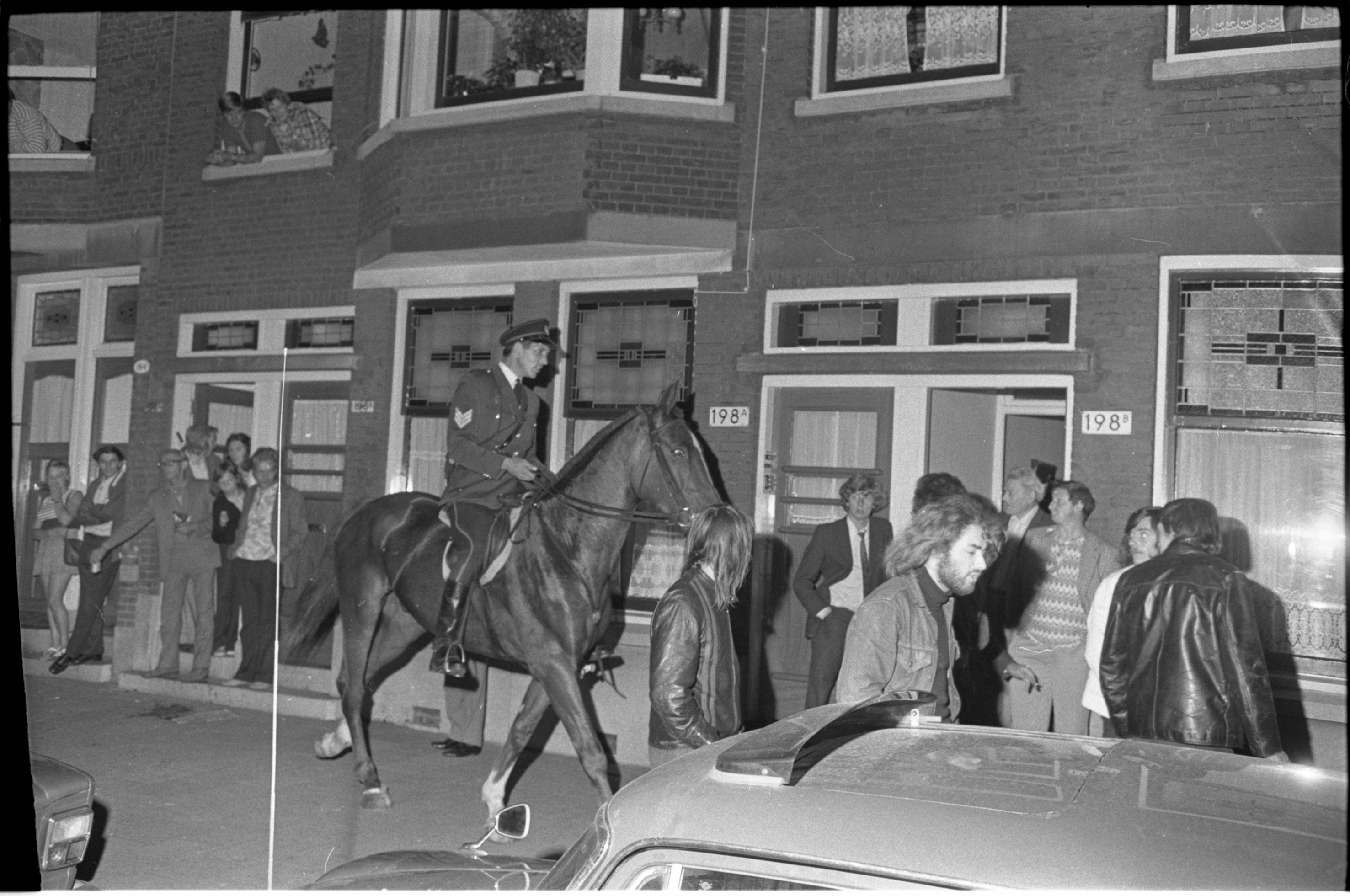
Police on horseback keep order during the riots, 1972

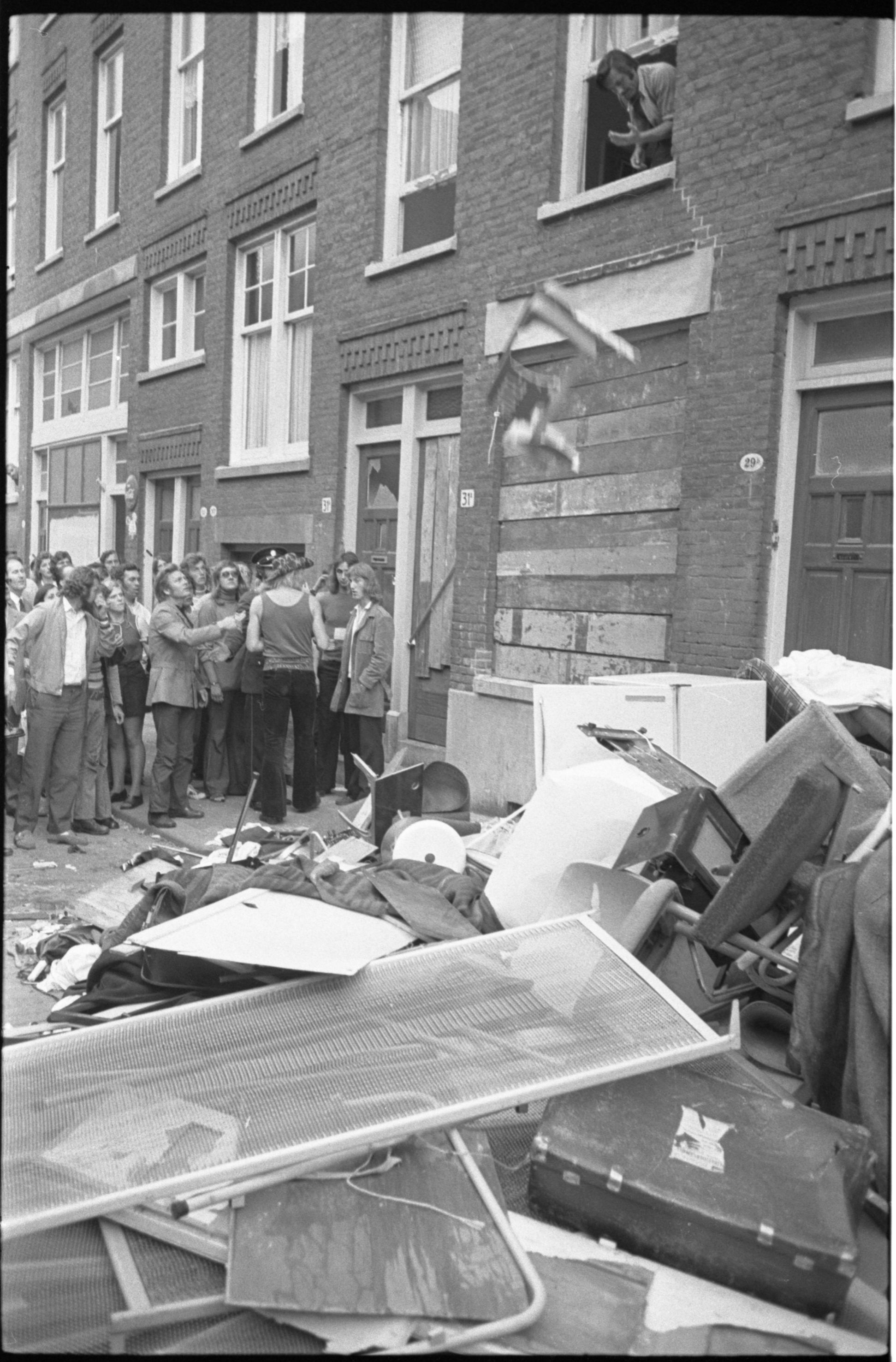
Residents throw belonging of Turks onto the street.

== See also ==
- Turks in the Netherlands
- Nieuwmarkt riots
- Amsterdam coronation riots
- Vondelstraat riots
- Schiedam riots
- 2017 Dutch–Turkish diplomatic incident
