= Piazza Center =

Building in the Netherlands

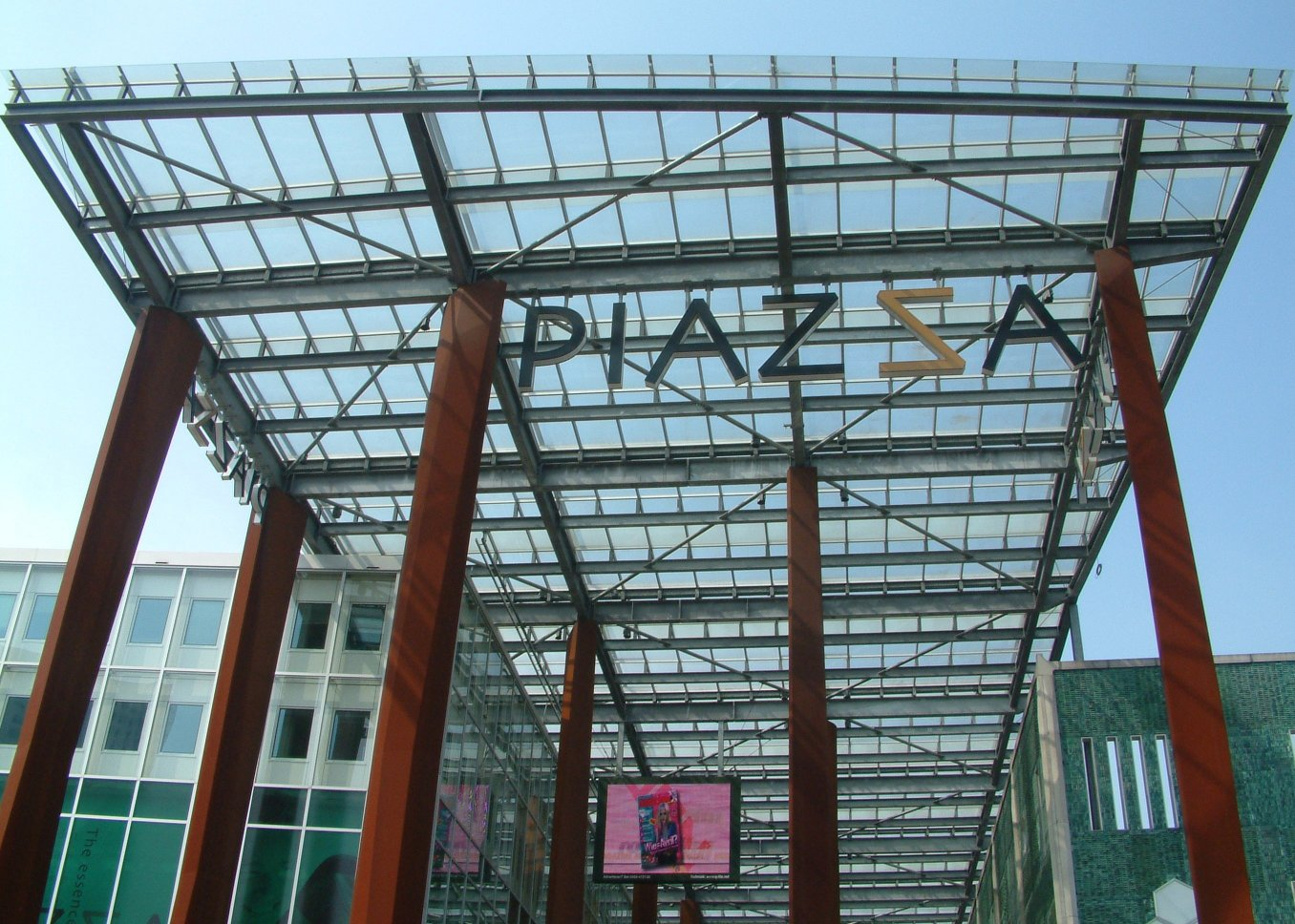
Piazza, entrance from the 18 September Square

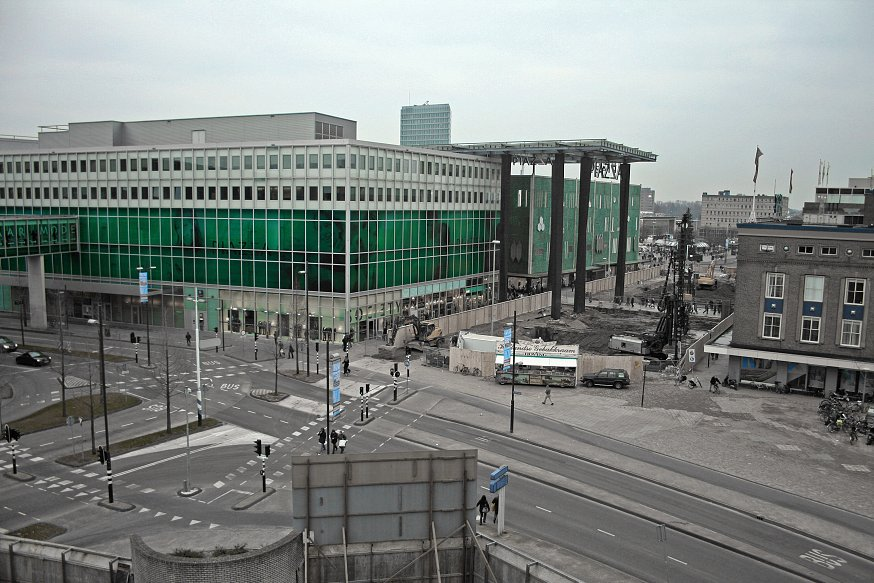
Piazza from the adjacent Lichttoren tower

The Piazza Center ("the Piazza") is a building and indoor shopping center in the city center of Eindhoven anchored by a branch of the upscale De Bijenkorf department store.

Opened in 1969, the Piazza was originally an open-air square, housing a red marble sculpture group designed by Mario Negri. The square was located between the De Bijenkorf building, designed by Gio Ponti and covered with green glazed tiles. Opposite stood a shopping center designed by Theo Boosten. In between was Perry van de Kar's sporting goods store with a tunnel to the right that led to the Fellenoord ^{[nl]} neighborhood of Eindhoven.

The square was designed as a recreational square, but it was mainly used as a youth hangout. There were also meetings, such as those of the Red Youth and the Rocking Rebels (founded in 1979 and emerged from the so-called Elvis gang). It later became a meeting place for skateboarders, where Wieger van Wageningen^{[nl]} became one of the world's best-known.

Ultimately, the activities mentioned did not fully meet the wishes of shoppers, the square looked a bit messy and the shopping center was not running smoothly. The Piazza was eventually completely reconstructed according to a design by Massimiliano Fuksas. It became a covered square. Negri's works of art were moved to the other side of De Bijenkorf, and the steel pipe sculpture designed by Frans Gast^{[nl]} was placed in Henri Dunant Park. An impressive steel entrance gate was built and a walkway was also added to the adjacent MediaMarkt electronics superstore and parking garage, located on the other side of the Boschdijk tunnel. The renovated Piazza was opened in 2015.
