= Amsterdam stabbing attack =

Amsterdam stabbing attack may refer to:

- 2018 Amsterdam stabbing attack, Afghan injured two American tourists
- 2025 Amsterdam stabbing attack, Ukrainian injured five people of various nationalities

== See also ==
- Amsterdam riots
