= 2021 Altındağ attack =

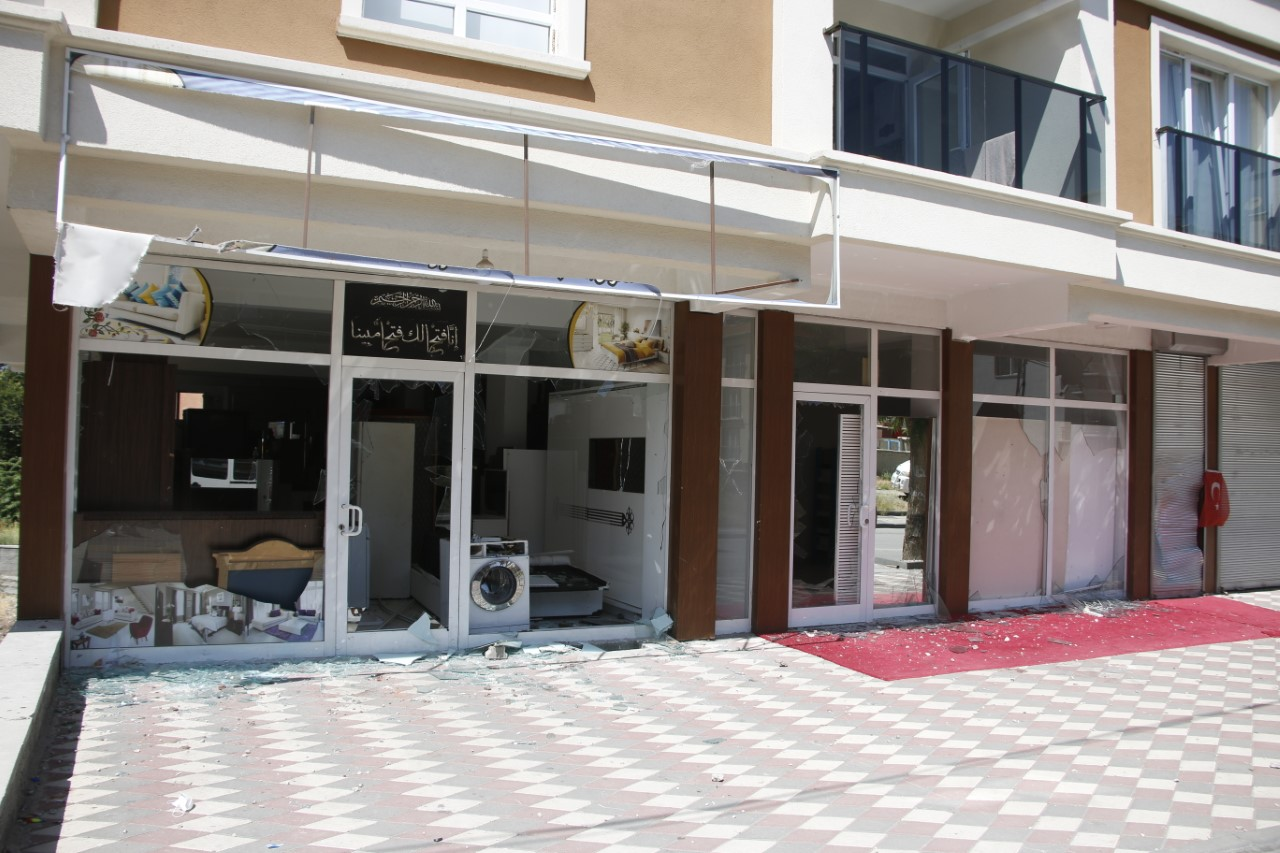
A shop belonging to Syrians vandalized by the riots

The Altındağ Incidents were a protest that took place on 10 August 2021 in the Battalgazi neighbourhood of Altındağ district of Ankara, as a result of a quarrel between a Syrian group and two men, Emirhan Yalçın and Ali Yasin Güler. Yalçın and Güler, who were wounded in the fight, were taken to Dışkapı Yıldırım Beyazıt Training and Research Hospital. Yalçın, who was reportedly wounded near his heart, was pronounced dead on 11 August.

26-year-old Yahya Abdo and Muhammed Abdo were arrested after the incident for allegedly injuring Yalçın. In his statement, Abdo said, "I suddenly started arguing with Emirhan, whom I had not seen before, in the park. Then we had a fight and I hit Emirhan with the knife I found in the park. Then I panicked and ran away. I am very regretful for committing this crime."

After this incident, crowded activist groups organized marches. These groups attacked the houses and shops of Syrians. Riot police were deployed to the tense areas. Other neighborhood residents reportedly tried to protect their shops with tarpaulins with the moon and star drawn on them and the words "T.C. Turkish Shop". A Syrian child was reportedly injured in the head as a result of the attacks. 76 people were detained as a result of the attacks Evrensel and Birgün described these attacks as racist, while Yeşil Gazete described them as a pogrom

Because of this, it was announced that all shops in the neighborhood were closed as a precautionary measure. Nevşin Mengü reported that Syrians were evacuated from the neighborhood. Of the apprehended persons, 64 had records for crimes such as extortion, intentional injury, damage to property, manufacture of narcotics, theft, etc. Administrative action was taken against 29 of them, while judicial proceedings were initiated against 43 of them. Police started to control the entrances and exits of Battalgazi neighborhood. Some activists drew parallels between the incident and the Afrikaanderwijk riots in Rotterdam to create an empathy with Syrians in Turkey.

Following the incident, Altındağ District Governorate made the following statements:

"Some of the demonstrations and incidents that took place in our Altındağ district this evening and as a result of the intensive work of our security forces, it has ended as of the moment. Our people are kindly requested not to rely on provocative news and posts."
