= 18 September Square =

Square in Eindhoven, the Netherlands

Coordinates: 51°26′28″N 5°28′37″E

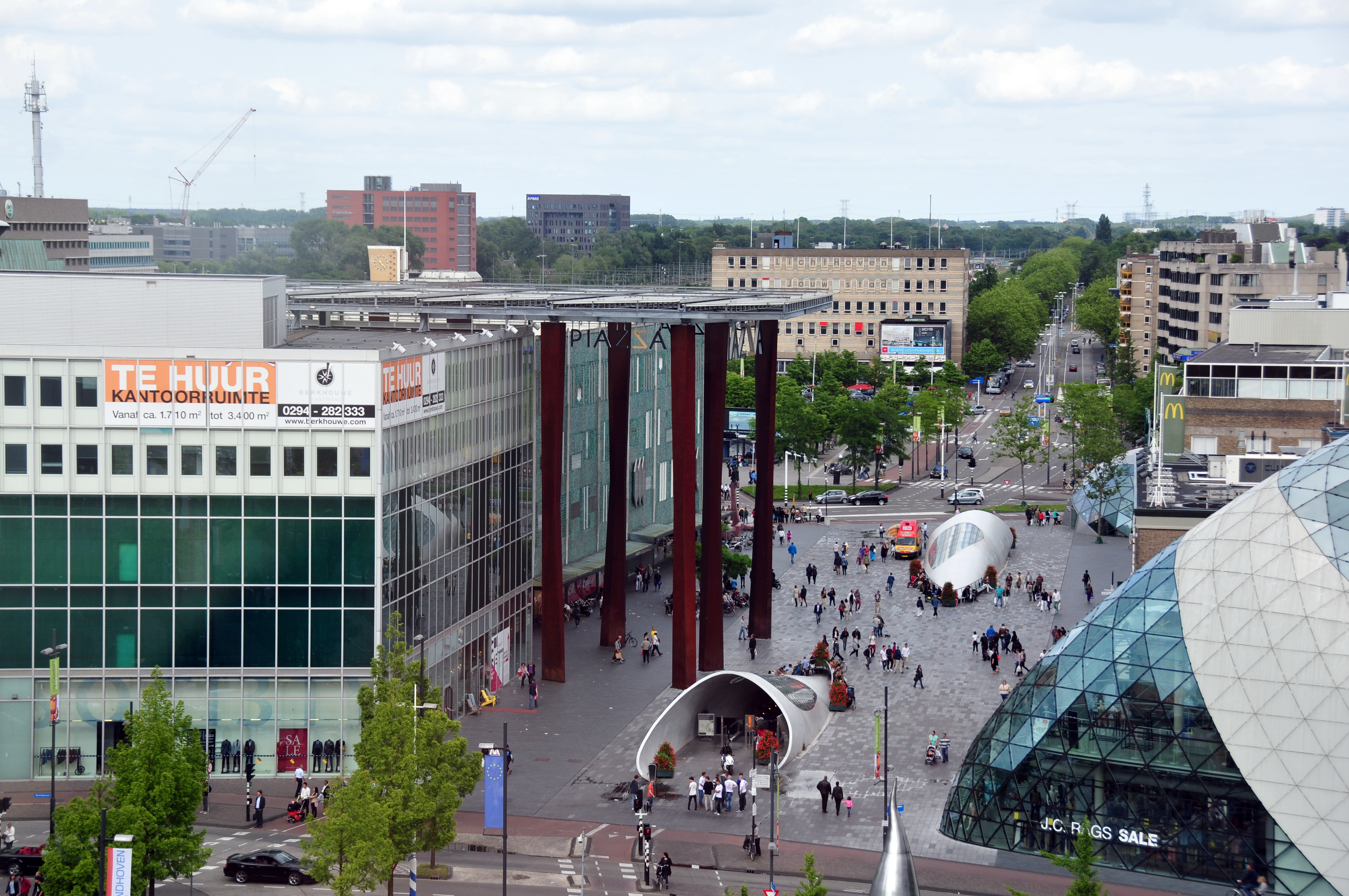
September 18 Square seen from the adjacent Lichttoren tower

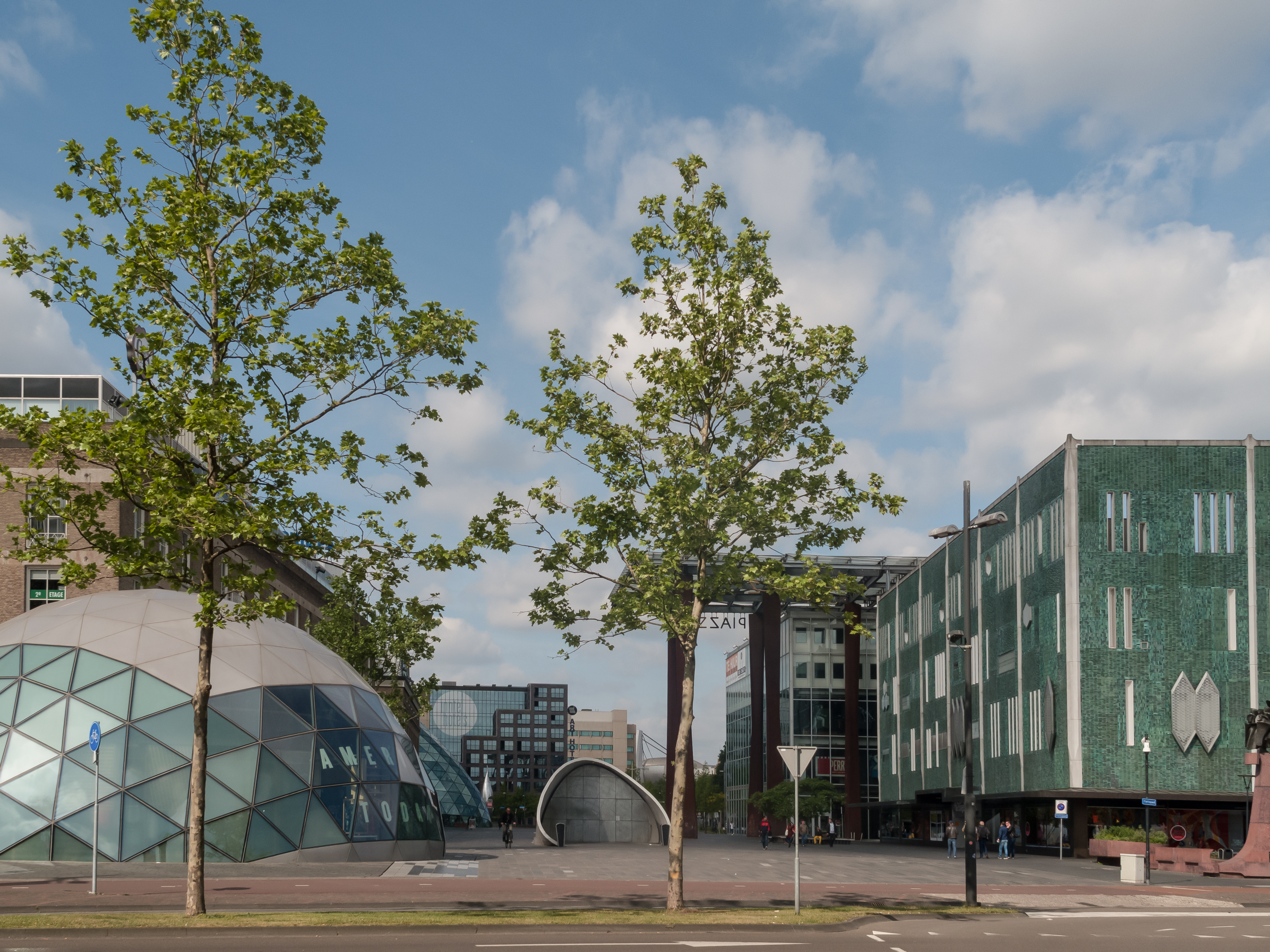
The square seen from the direction of the train station

The 18 September Square (Dutch: 18 Septemberplein) is a square in the Dutch city of Eindhoven. It is the connection between Eindhoven Centraal railway station and the city's shopping center.

== Name ==
The square owes its name to the liberation of Eindhoven on September 18, 1944, during Operation Market Garden. On this date, allied armies entered Eindhoven, liberating one of the first cities in the Netherlands from German occupation. From the north came the United States Army and from the south came the British Army; the British Second Army, including the Irish Guards. The Americans met the British in the center of town.

Each year, a celebration of Eindhoven's liberation and commemoration takes place on September 18.

== Characteristics ==
The square is characterized by the combination of space, luxurious paving, a special design of the entrances to the bicycle basement, water fountains, trees, art, benches and a dynamic play of lights. The free bicycle basement the Tube is accessible by moving walkways and can accommodate about 1,250 bicycles and 60 mopeds. A characteristic feature of the bike shelter is its unusual entrances, which seem to emerge from the ground like tubes. The 18 September Square is home to a C&A, HEMA, De Bijenkorf and McDonald's, among others. In the middle at the edge of the square is the indoor shopping center Piazza Center. On the Emmasingel, next to the Lichttoren is the Blob, a futuristic, blobitecture building that is particularly striking in its surroundings. Also located on the 18 September Square is the Bubble.

Every Tuesday a weekly market is held on the 18 September Square from 9 a.m. to 4 p.m. and the square is filled with numerous stalls.

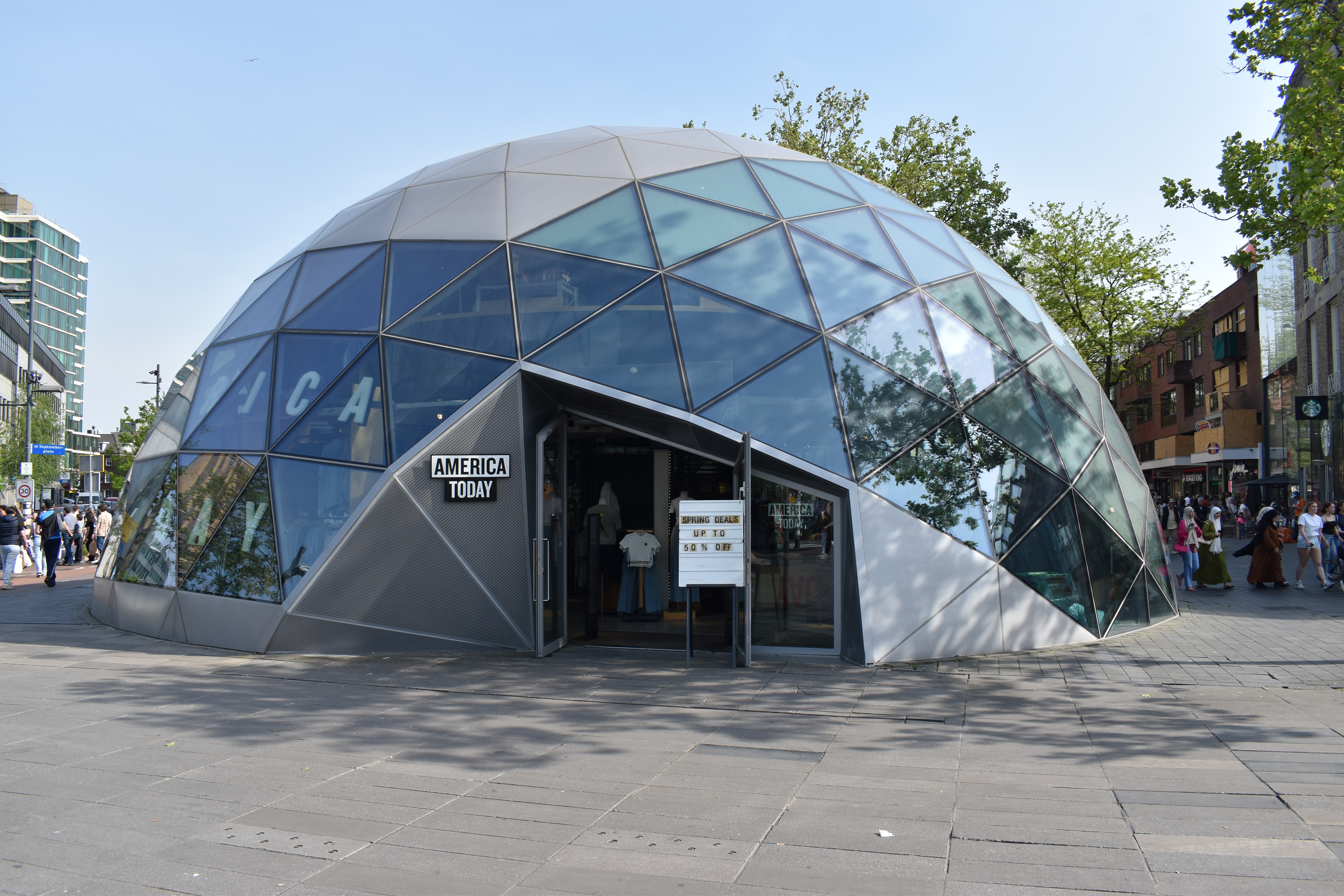
The Bubble

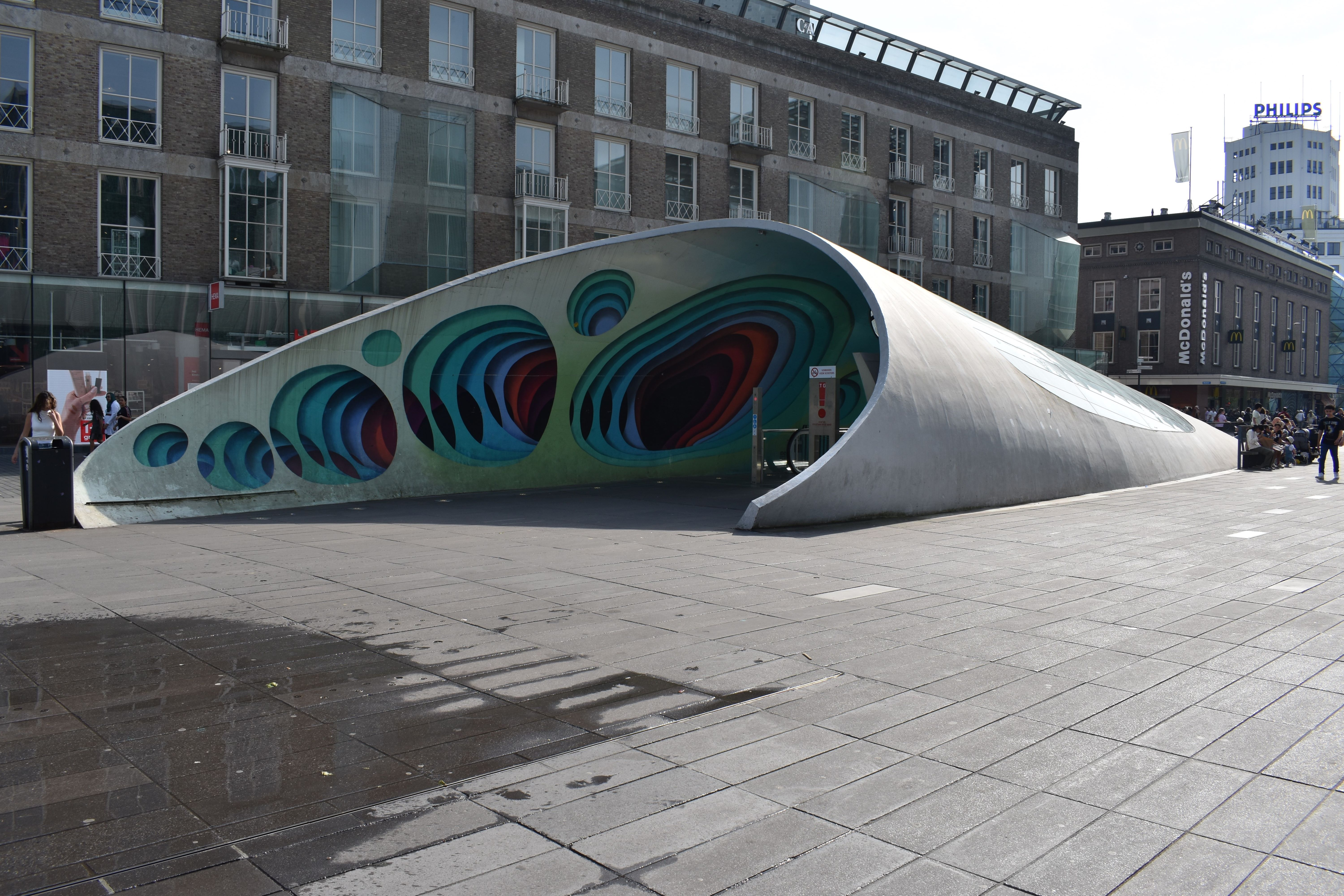
The Tube (east entrance)

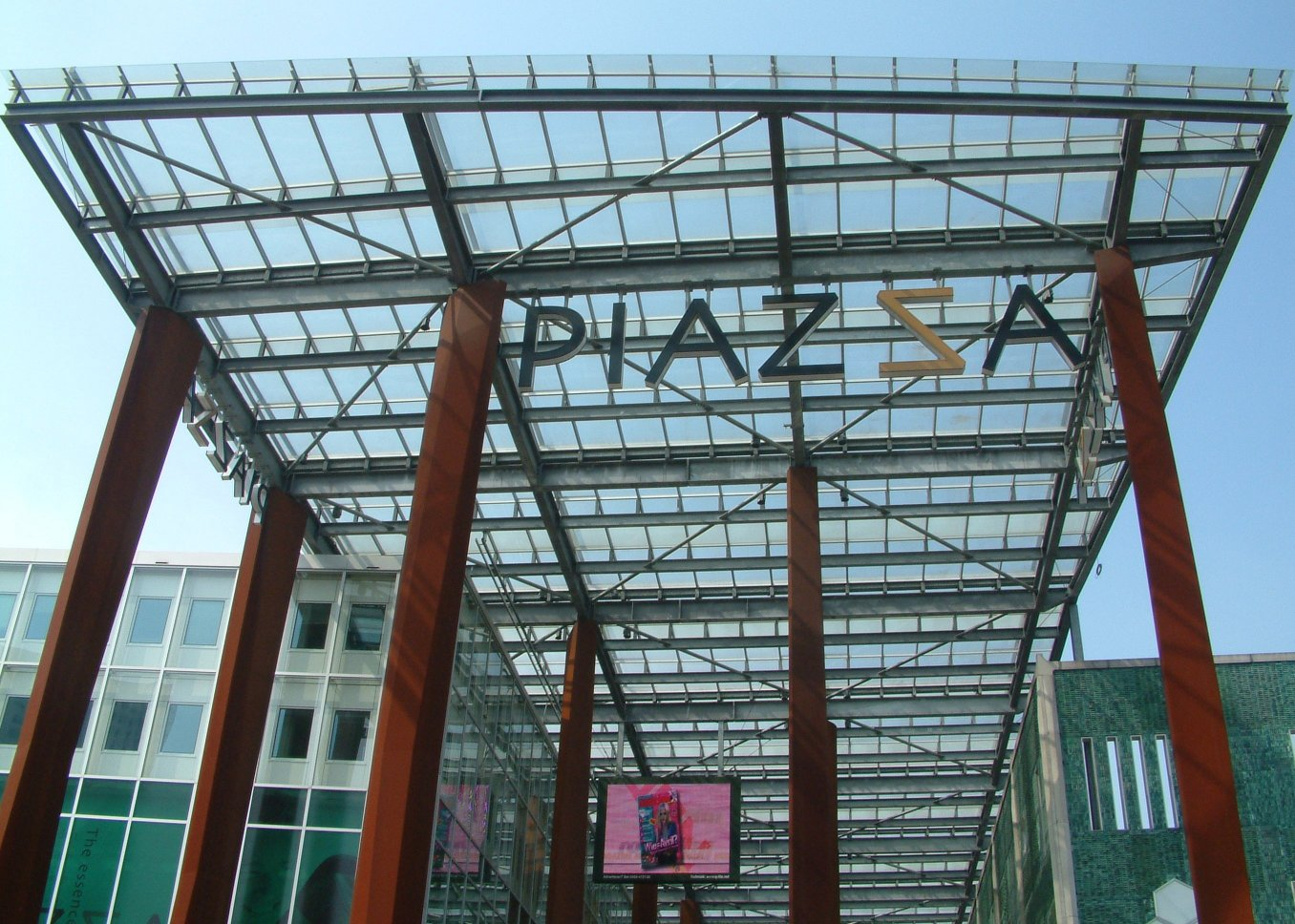
Piazza Center

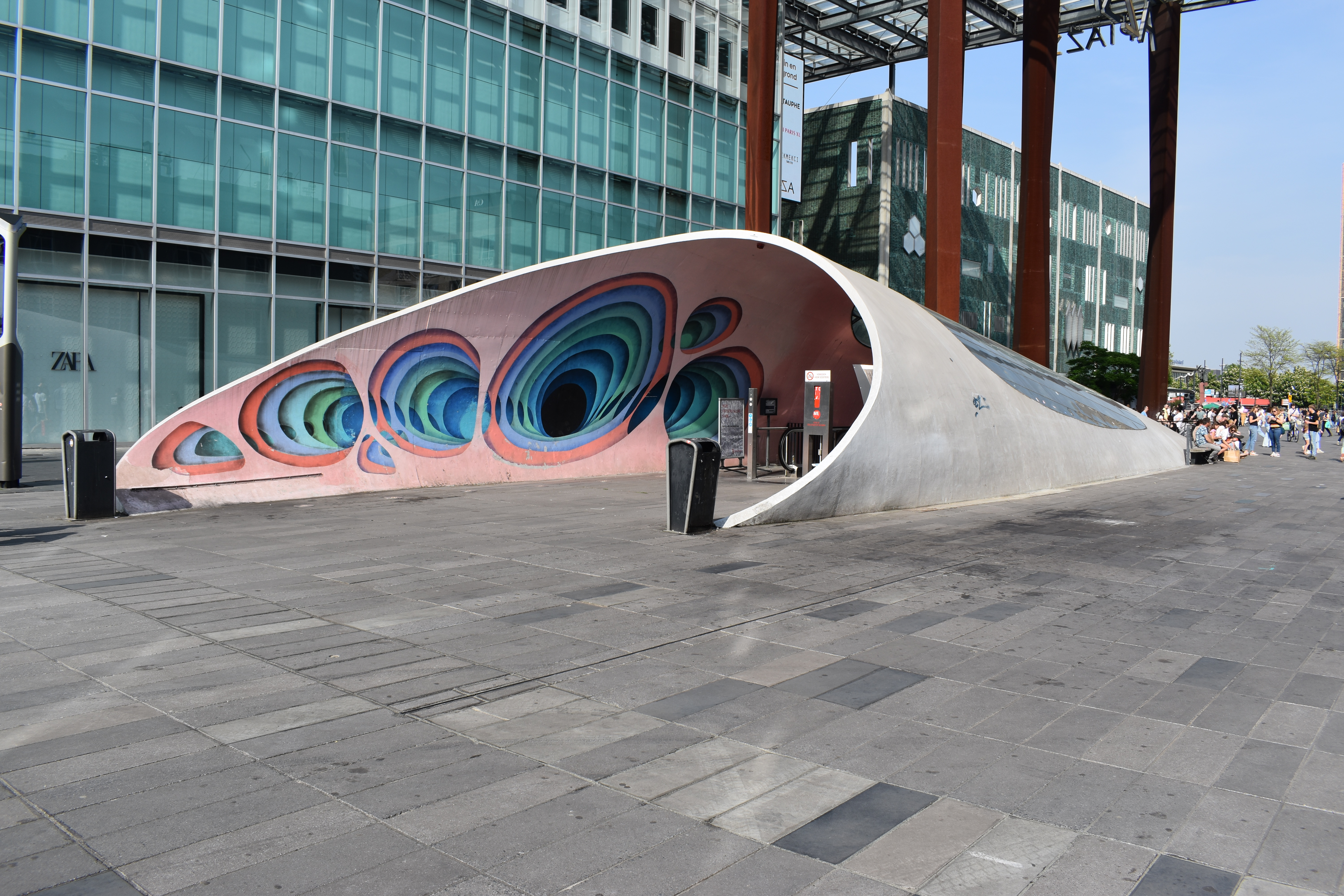
The Tube (west entrance)

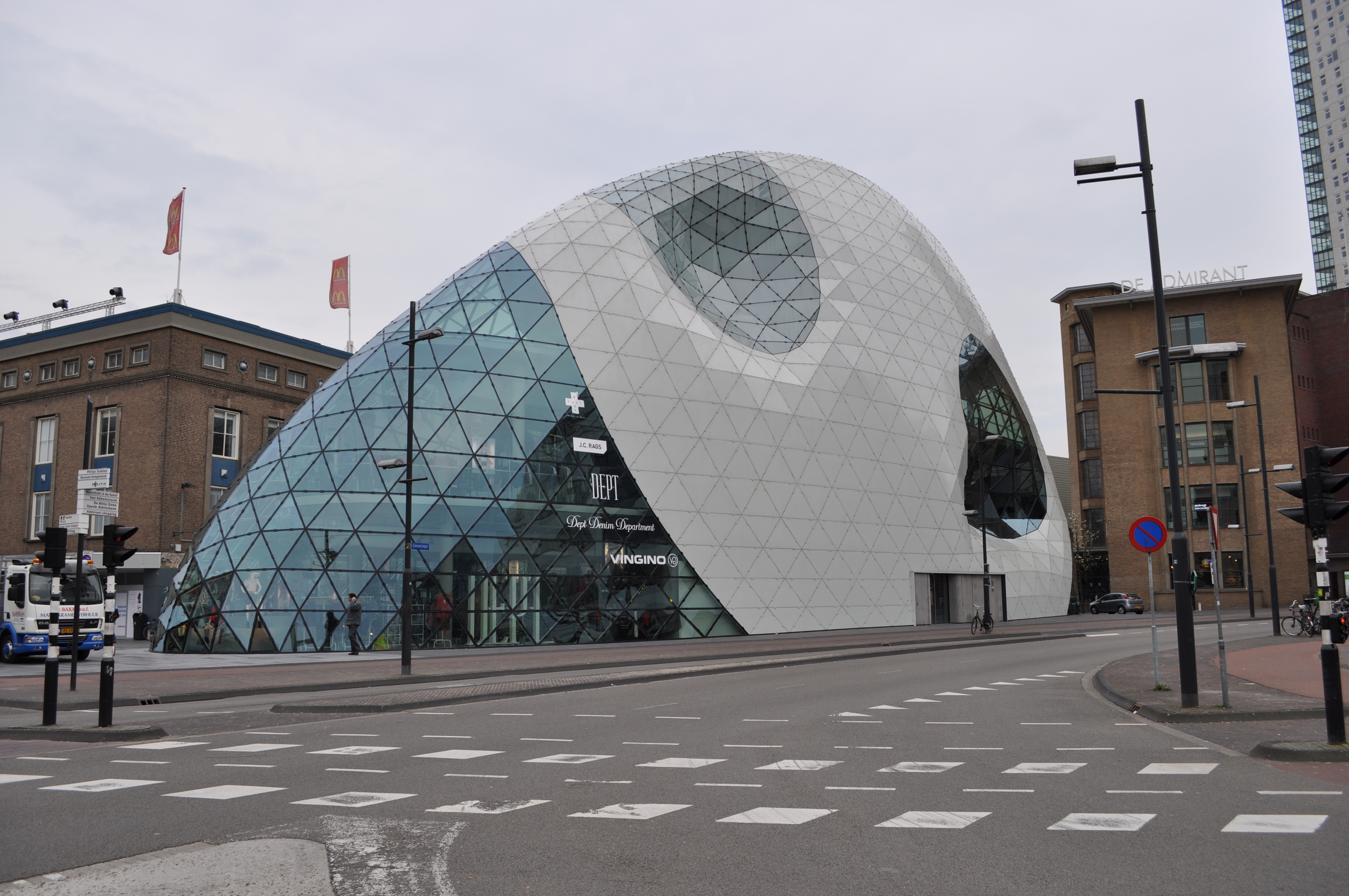
The Blob
