= Vondelstraat riots =

1980 riots in the Netherlands

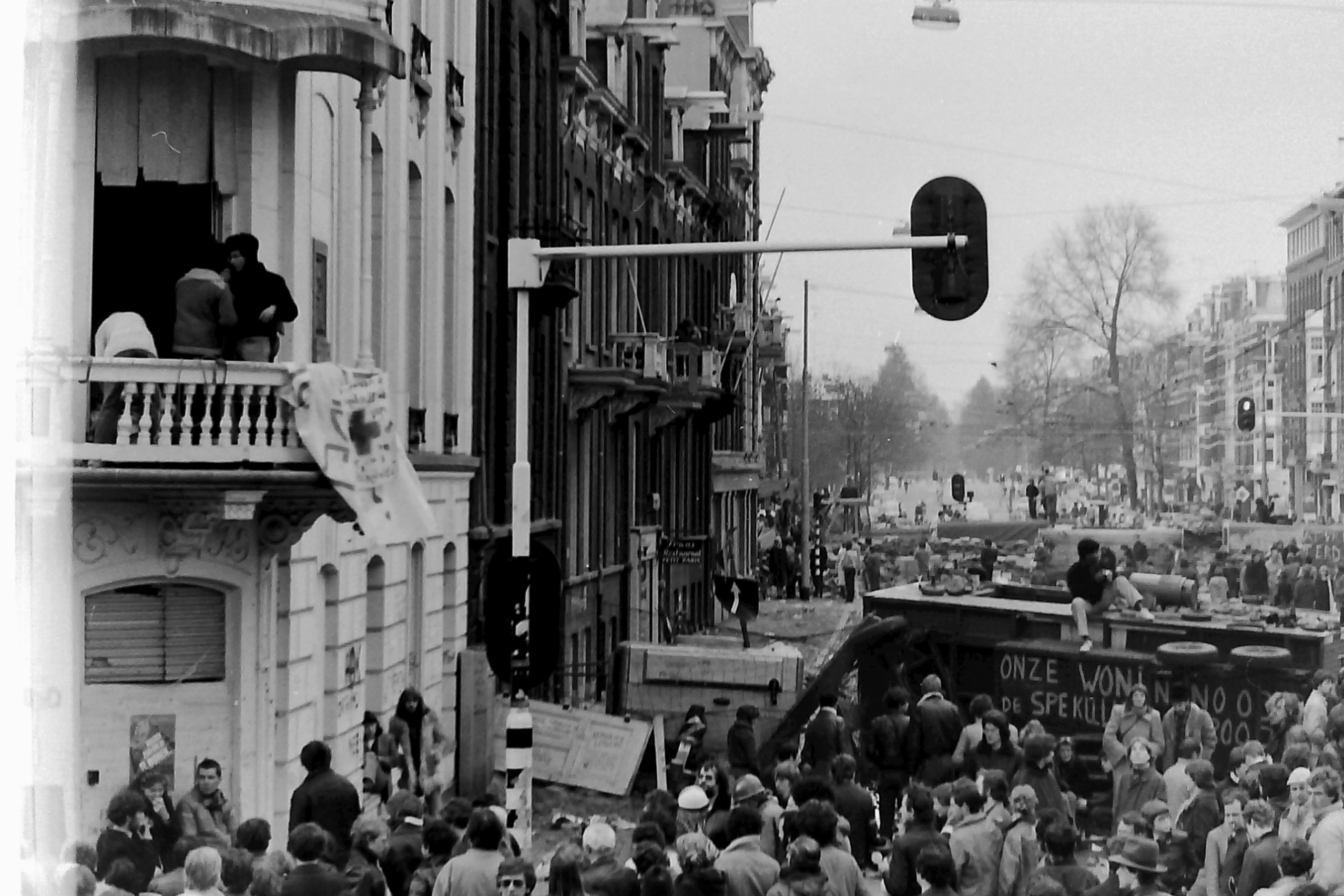
A photo during the riots

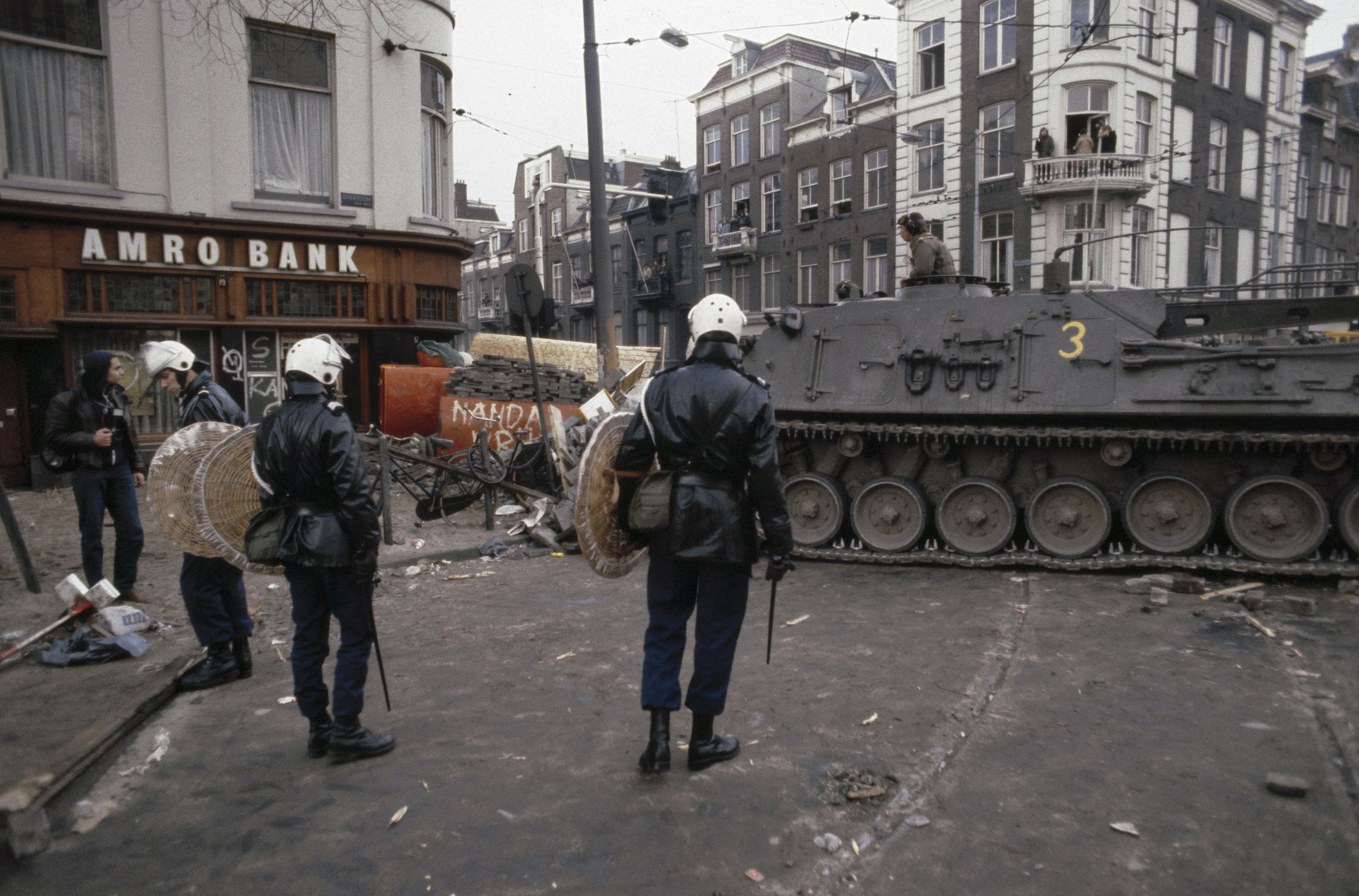
An armoured engineering vehicle clearing barricades

The Vondelstraat riots (Dutch: Vondelstraatrellen) were violent disturbances on Vondelstraat in Amsterdam, the Netherlands between squatters and the state in March 1980. It was one of the most serious disturbances involving squatters in the country.

== Background ==
During the 1970s, squatting became increasingly prevalent in Amsterdam due to the lack of housing and the high number of decayed buildings in the city centre. Many of the squatters occupying land were young adults from the baby boom generation who had trouble finding homes. A previous riot in Amsterdam happened in 1966. Authorities did little to stop them before the events of 1980. Many riots occurred between the squatters and the authorities (overall referred to as Krakersrellen), the biggest being the Nieuwmarkt Riots in 1975.

By the late 1970s the mood changed as politicians and real estate owners called for action against squatters. The mayor of Amsterdam at the time, Wim Polak, decided to start cracking down on squatters.

== Events ==
Vondelstraat is a residential street in the centre of Amsterdam and was the location of a large squatting squad that occupied property. On 29 February, the state evicted squatters from a building on the corner of Vondelstraat and Eerste Constantijn Huygensstraat. Amid violent protests from hundreds of squatters, who reoccupied the building and built huge barricades, over a thousand police officers and soldiers were deployed to stop their actions.

The rioters threw objects and petrol bombs, and police responded with tear gas. Ultimately, the Royal Netherlands Army deployed armoured engineering vehicles to demolish the barricades and drive away the squatters. Calm returned that day.

Fifty police officers were hurt during the events.

== Aftermath ==
Another massive squatting protest happened on 30 April 1980 during the coronation of Queen Beatrix. Other riots, albeit smaller, also happened in August, September and December, as well as in 1981 and 1982. In the late 1980s the squatting movement became less prevalent, particularly after the increase of house building in the city. In 2010, the Dutch parliament voted to ban squatting entirely.

== See also ==
- Afrikaanderwijk riots
