= Nieuwmarkt riots =

1975 riots in the Netherlands

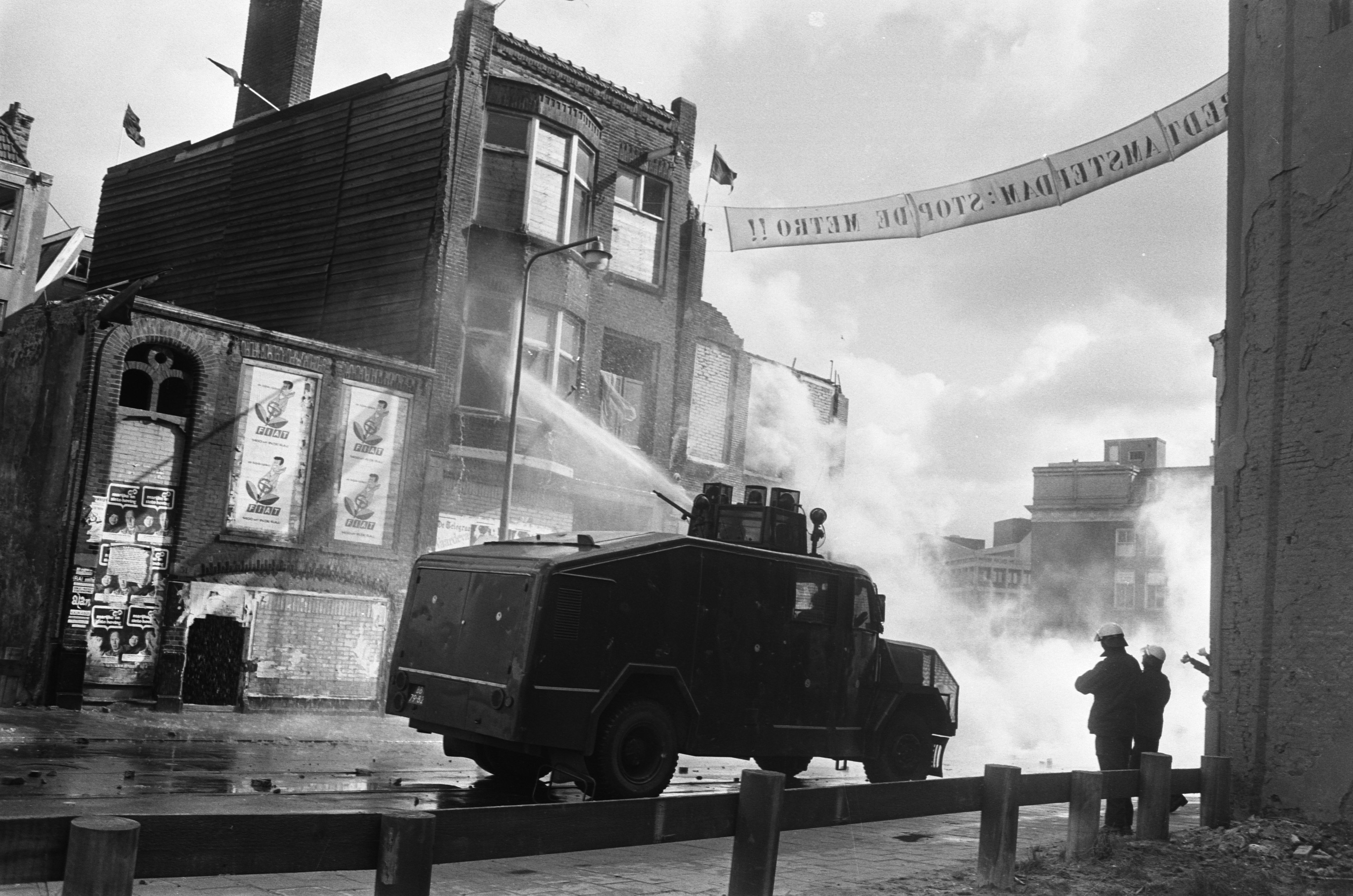
- Nieuwmarkt Riots on 24 March 1975
- Date: 24 March – 8 April 1975
- Location: Nieuwmarkt, Amsterdam, Netherlands
- Caused by: Construction of the Amsterdam Metro
- Methods: Rioting, protests, barricades
- Result: Future plans for additional metro lines are abandoned

Parties
Local residents	100+ Municipal police officers 500 Military police officers

The Nieuwmarkt riots (Dutch: Nieuwmarktrellen), also referred to as the Amsterdam metro riots, were a series of serious disturbances in the Nieuwmarkt neighbourhood of Amsterdam, Netherlands. On 24 March 1975, which later became known as Blue Monday, and on 8 April 1975, protests against the planned demolition of homes ended in confrontations with over a hundred municipal police supported by 500 military police. The homes were considered by residents and protesters to be in good condition, but had to make way for the construction of the East Line tunnel of the Amsterdam metro. This was needed because the construction of the 3.5 km tunnel was largely done by sinking large concrete caissons. As a result of the riots, the city council of Amsterdam decided to abandon further plans for additional metro lines.

In 1980, the Nieuwmarkt metro station was opened. It is decorated with artworks that memorialize the turbulent times.

== See also ==
- Vondelstraat riots
- Amsterdam coronation riots
- Afrikaanderwijk riots
