= Amsterdam coronation riots =

1980 riots in the Netherlands

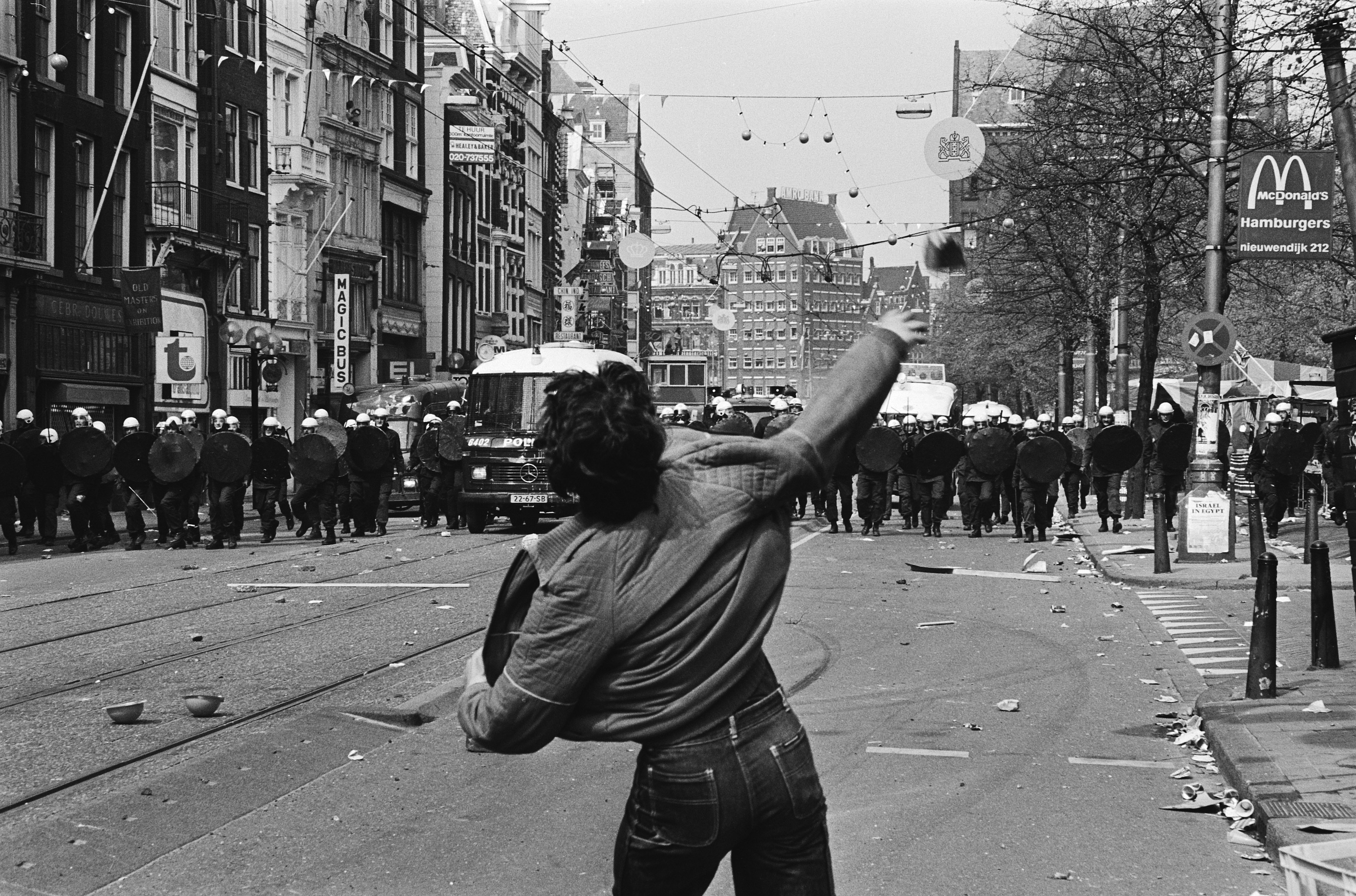
A man throwing an object at riot police on the Rokin

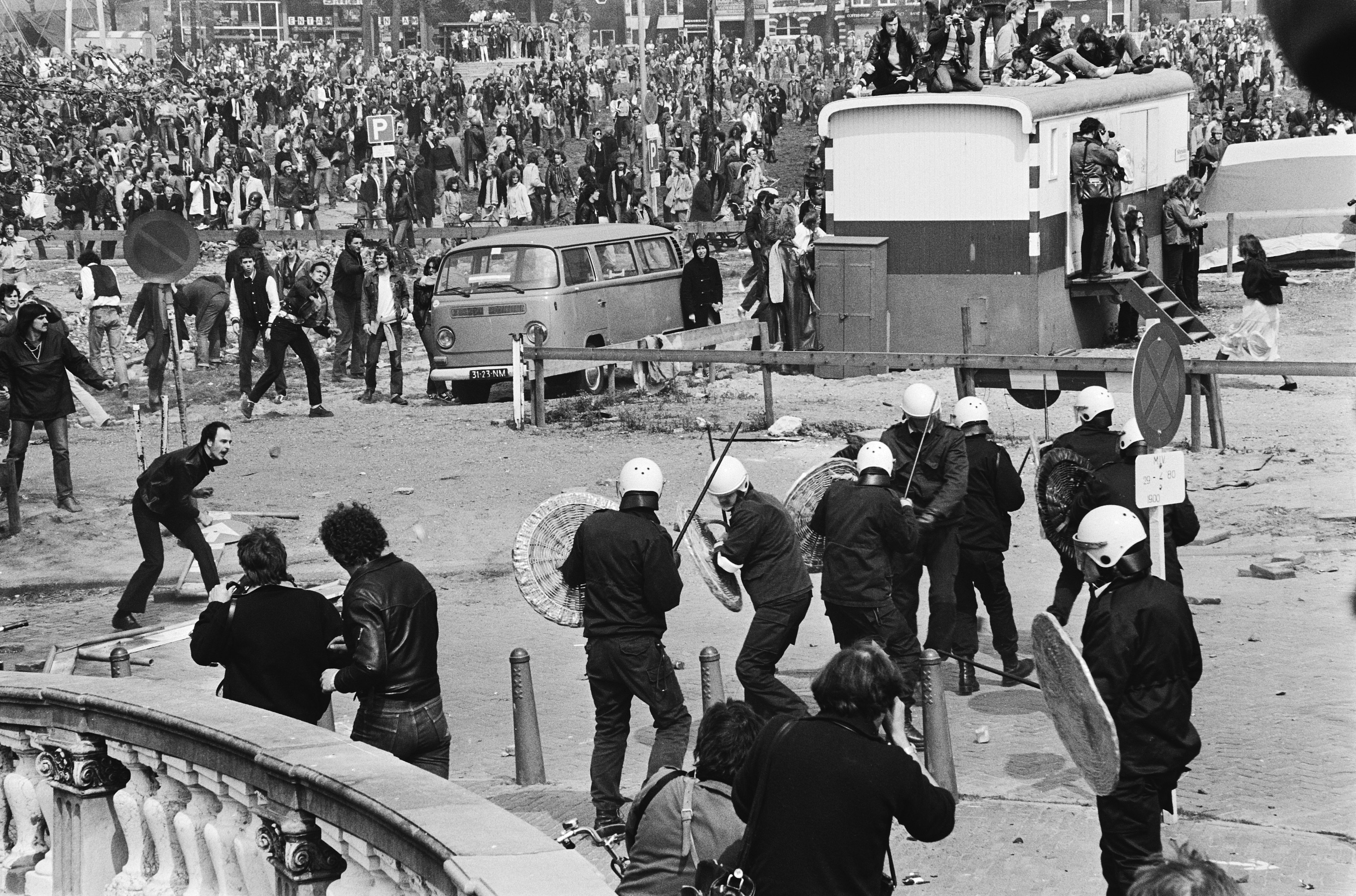
Clashes between the protesters and security forces

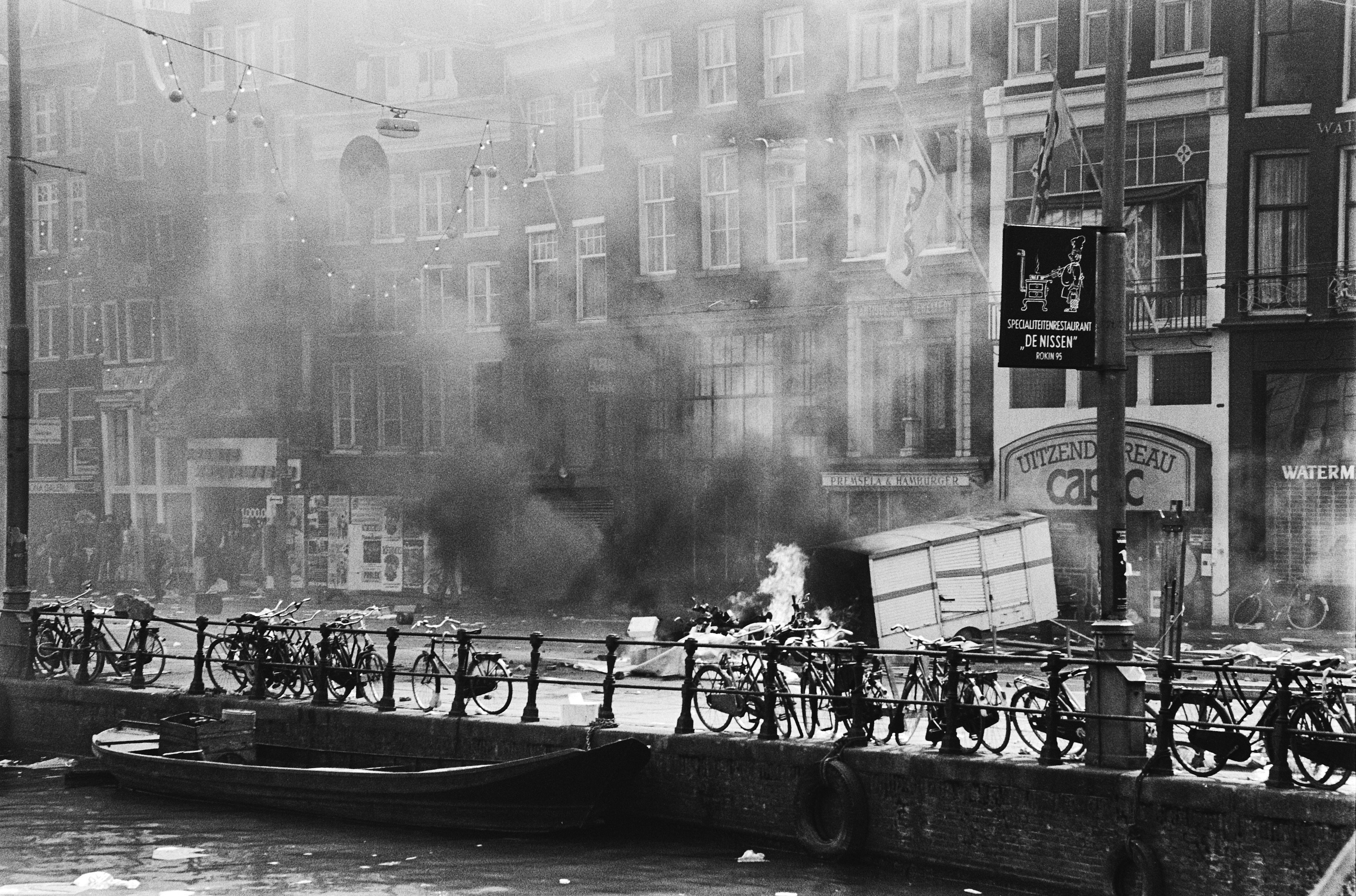
Burnings

Major violence and rioting took place in Amsterdam, the Netherlands, on the day of the accession of Queen Beatrix, 30 April 1980. It was one of the biggest episodes of such disturbances in the country since the end of World War II in Europe and the most significant event of the Dutch squatters' movement (Krakersrellen).

== Background ==
Since the 1960s and the 1970s, squatting had become common in Amsterdam to protest the city's shortage of housing. Many of the protesters were young people of the baby boomer generation. The 1980 riots were preceded by the Afrikaanderwijk riots in 1972, Nieuwmarkt Riots in 1975 and the Vondelstraat Riots in March 1980, when authorities heavily responded to evict squatters from properties in the city.

== Riots ==
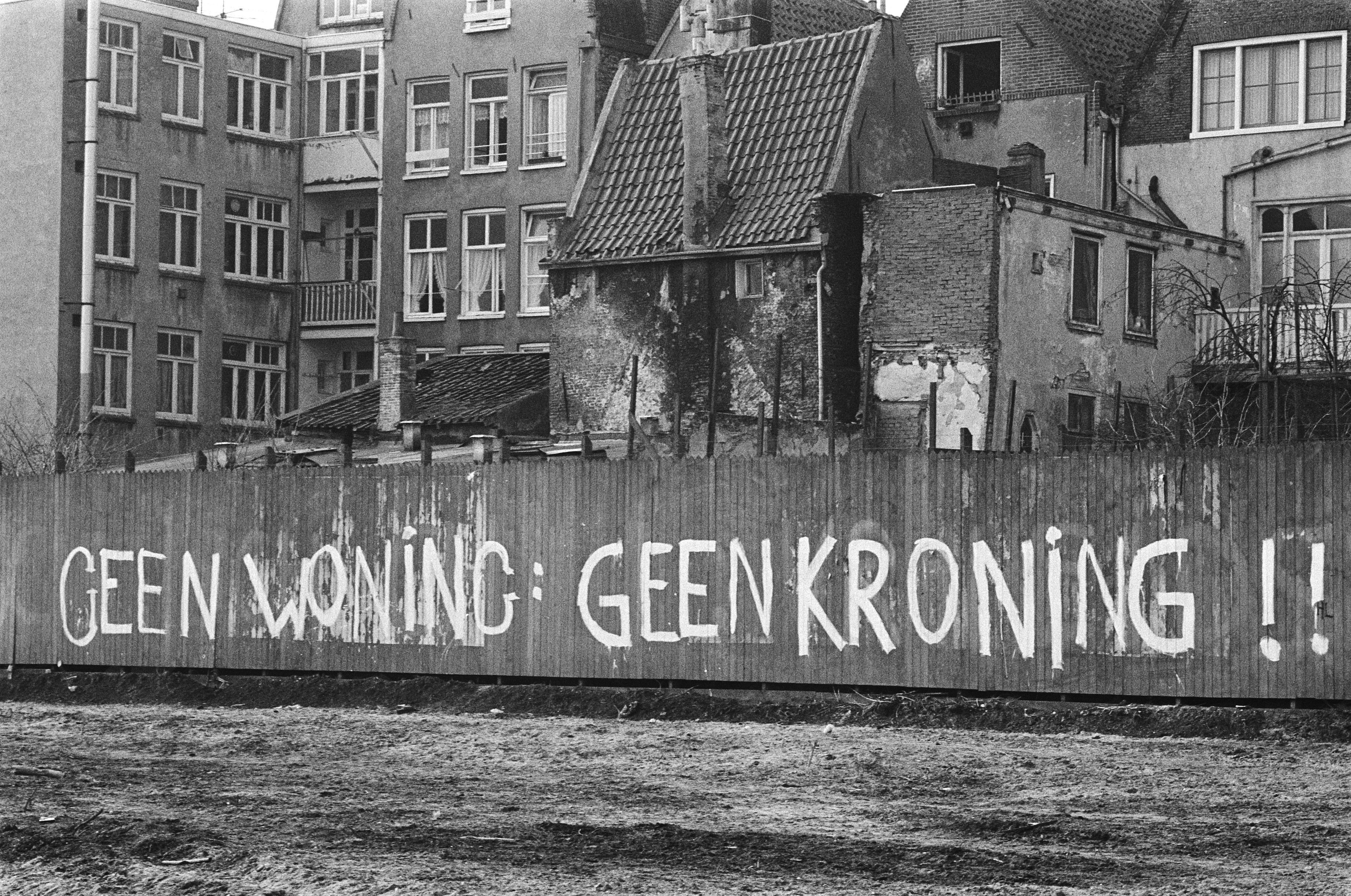
The main slogan of the protests, written on a wall on 26 March 1980, a month before the riots

Beatrix ascended the throne on 30 April 1980, and squatters started to riot. The protesters were rallying under the slogan Geen woning, geen kroning (No housing, no coronation). Due to the presence of 10,000 police officers, gendarmes and some military officers, the event turned into a major clash. The riots were centred around the Dam Square, where the new Queen's inauguration took place. Clashes also happened in and around Blauwbrug, Rokin and Vondelstraat.

One of the protesters, Karel Fassotte, claimed in an interview that apart from squatters, people taking part included ordinary students and football hooligans.

It marked a milestone in the mostly peaceful post-war history of the Netherlands. 600 people were wounded in the riots.

== Aftermath ==
A new police leadership in Amsterdam started to force the evacuation of squatted buildings, including through special means.

In 2010, the Dutch parliament voted to ban squatting entirely.

== See also ==
- 2021 Dutch curfew riots
