= Jacques Antoine Bonebakker =

Dutch gold and silversmith (1798–1868)

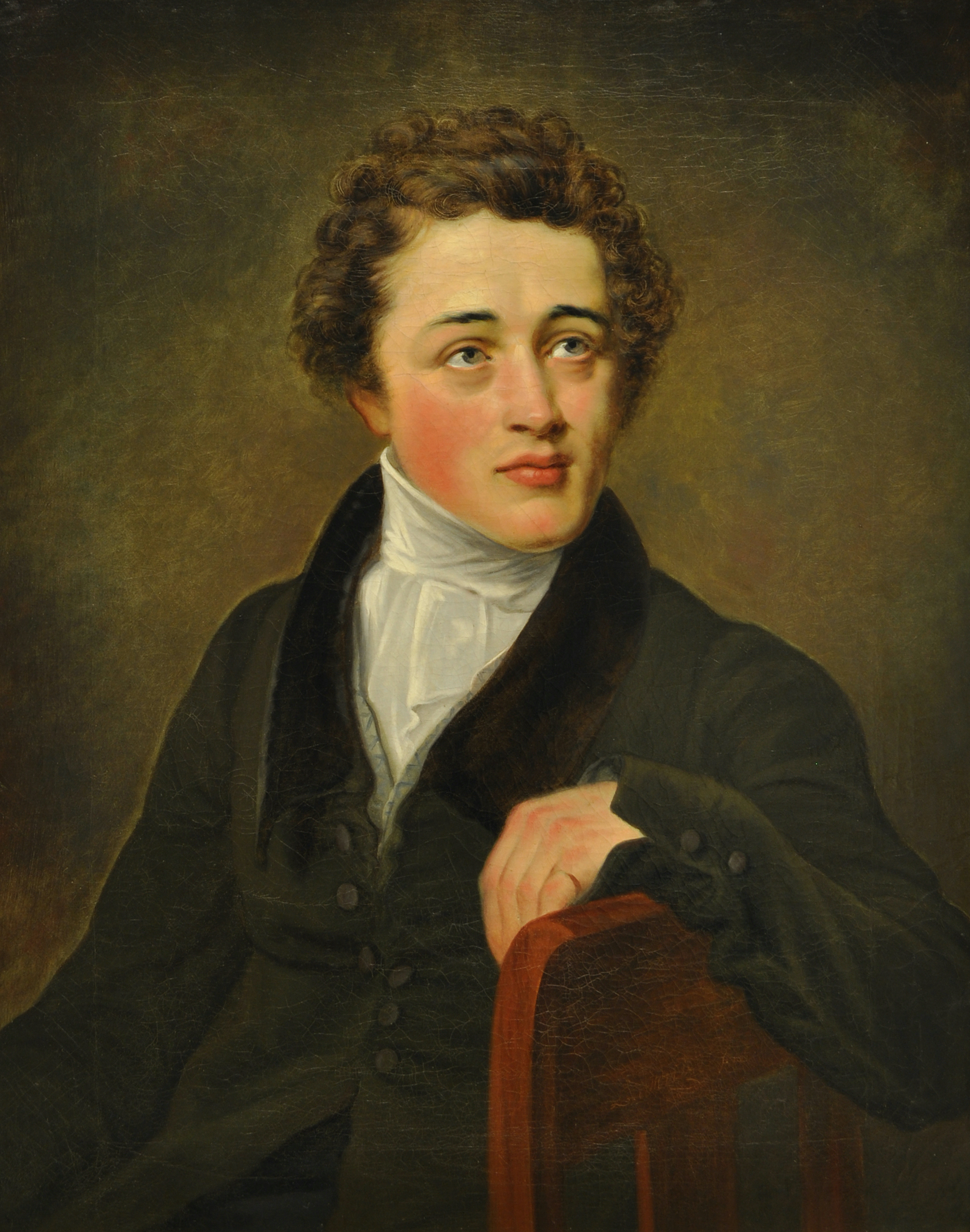
- Portrait by Louis Moritz
- Born: 16 November 1798; Amsterdam, Batavian Republic
- Died: 17 March 1868 (aged 69); Amsterdam, Netherlands

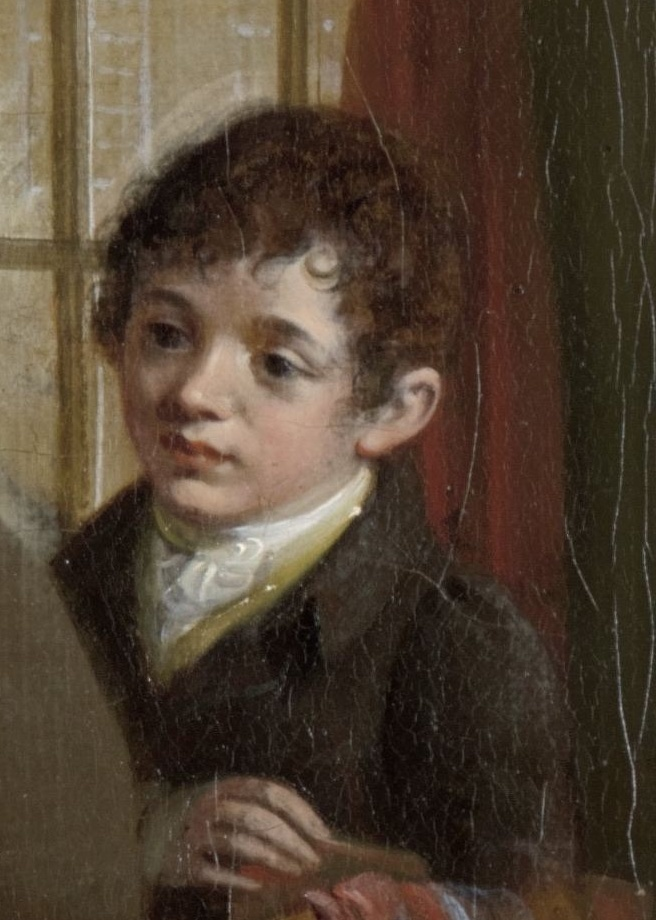
Jacques Antoine Bonebakker (approximately 11 years old at the time) on a family portrait of Adrianus Bonebakker’s family. Detail of a painting by Adriaan de Lelie in 1809, Rijksmuseum Amsterdam.

Jacques Antoine Bonebakker (Amsterdam, 16 November 1798 – 17 March 1868) was a Dutch goldsmith, silversmith and jeweller.

== Biography ==
Bonebakker was the son of Adrianus Bonebakker (1767–1842) and Elisabeth du Pré (1760–1811). He married Wendelina Elisabeth van Manen (1803–1865) on 23 June 1825. Three daughters and two sons, Willem Christiaan Bonebakker (1827–1906) and Johannes Christiaan Reinier Bonebakker (1829–1883), were born from this marriage.

=== As Bonebakker & Zoon ===
His father partnered up with Diederik Lodewijk Bennewitz to take over a well-known Dutch gold, silver and jewellery shop in 1802, the Peirolet brothers’ business. Initially under the brothers Peirolet, Bennewitz & Bonebakker name and later as Bennewitz & Bonebakker. The company carried out countless assignments, like the keys to the City of Amsterdam in 1806, which were to be offered to King Lodewijk Napoleon as he entered the city. The partners decided to part company in 1821 for business reasons, after which Bennewitz launched the Bennewitz & Zonen company and Bonebakker and his son continued under the As Bonebakker & Zoon name. Bonebakker settled in a building on the corner of the Leidsestraat and the Herengracht in 1822.

Jacques Antoine Bonebakker was registered as a gold and silversmith in the Guarantee Register on 28 January 1822, but probably never ended up using the Master’s mark. The gold, silver and jewellery objects were outsourced to gold and silversmiths like T.G. Bentvelt, J.A. de Haas, R. Helweg, J.H. Stellingwerff and P. Pieterse.

The company was commissioned by the City of Amsterdam to produce a 94-piece silver dinner service for King Willem I’s daughter, Princess Marianne van Oranje-Nassau, on the occasion of her marriage to Prince Albert van Pruisen in 1830. This cost a total of 18,837 guilders. Princess Marianne gave the City of Amsterdam a portrait of herself in 1832, to show her gratitude for the dinner service. As Bonebakker & Zoon also received a number of other special assignments in addition to commissions for the production of silverware, including the golden honorary sword for General David Hendrik baron Chassé, who commanded a Dutch division during the wars against Napoleon, including the Battle of Waterloo in 1815. The golden sword was given to Chassé by a group of Tiel friends. Another golden sword was ordered shortly after the Ten Day Campaign in August 1831, this time commissioned by the Prince of Oranje. The company was commissioned by King Willem II to make the royal crown in 1840. The maker of this crown, which to this day is still being used during coronation ceremonies, was Theodorus Gerardus Bentvelt.

The house situated on the corner of the Leidsestraat and the Herengracht was the company’s official residence for fifteen years, until Bonebakker was forced to move to larger premises. As Bonebakker & Zoon moved to the eighteenth century ‘Het Witte Paard’ canal house in 1837, now Herengracht 376, where the company stayed until its move to Rokin 88-90 in 1954. Bonebakker decided to set up his own gold and silversmith workshop in 1854. He bought the Korte Leidsedwarsstraat 51 property, attracted a skilled master and took on master silversmith Pieter Pieterse, who was put in charge of the workshop. The pieces of work which left the new workshop all bore the Bonebakker master’s mark. Bonebakker’s sons Willem Christiaan and Johannes Christiaan Reinier also joined the company as the third generation that same year.

Jacques Antoine Bonebakker had managed the company for forty-four years – either partly or alone – by the time he died in 1868. His sons continued the As Bonebakker & Zoon company. The company still exists today, under the Bonebakker name.
