= Bonebakker family =

Dutch patrician family

Bonebakker
- family
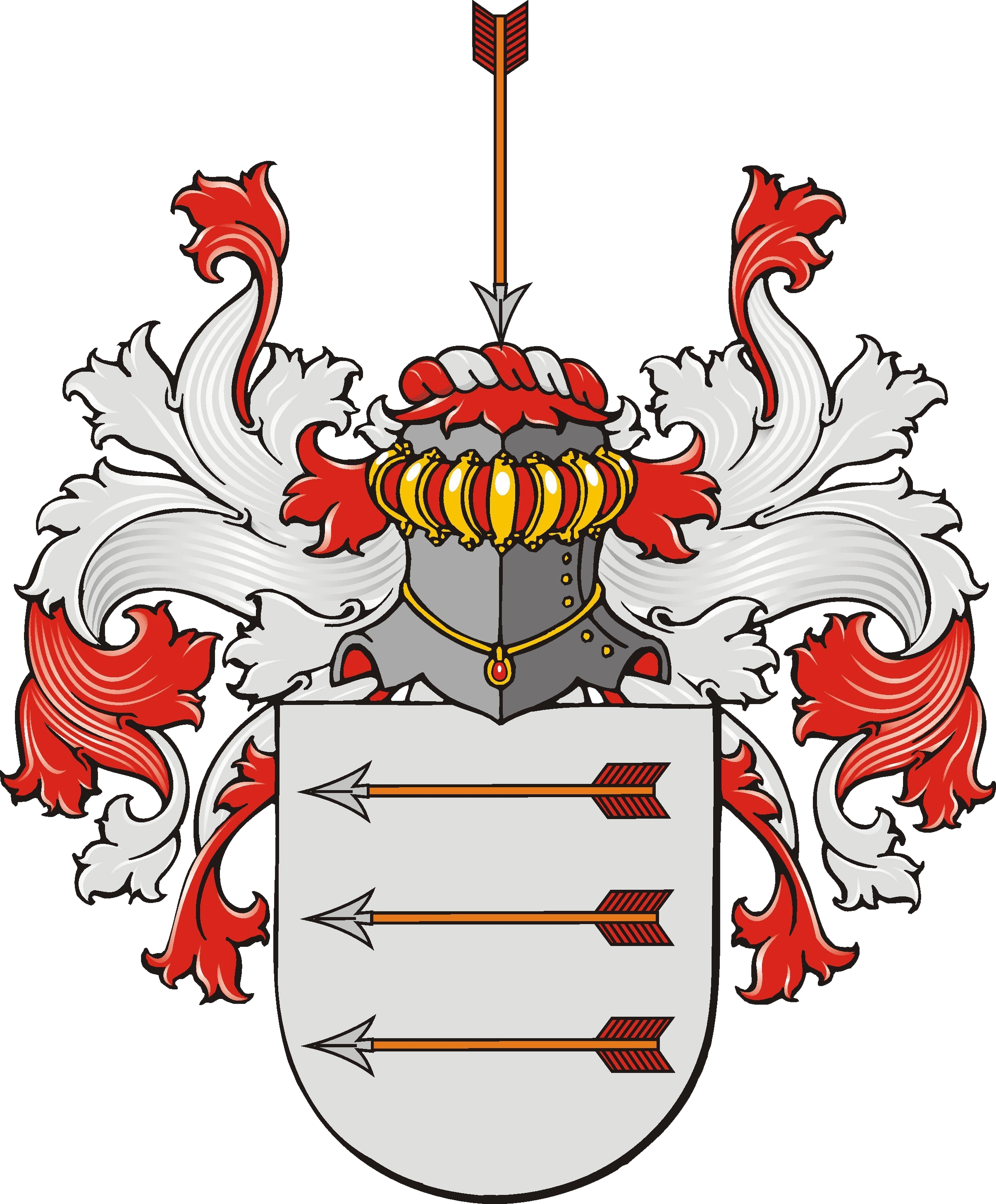
- Country: Netherlands
- Founded: 17th century
- Founder: Reynier Dircss Boonebacker

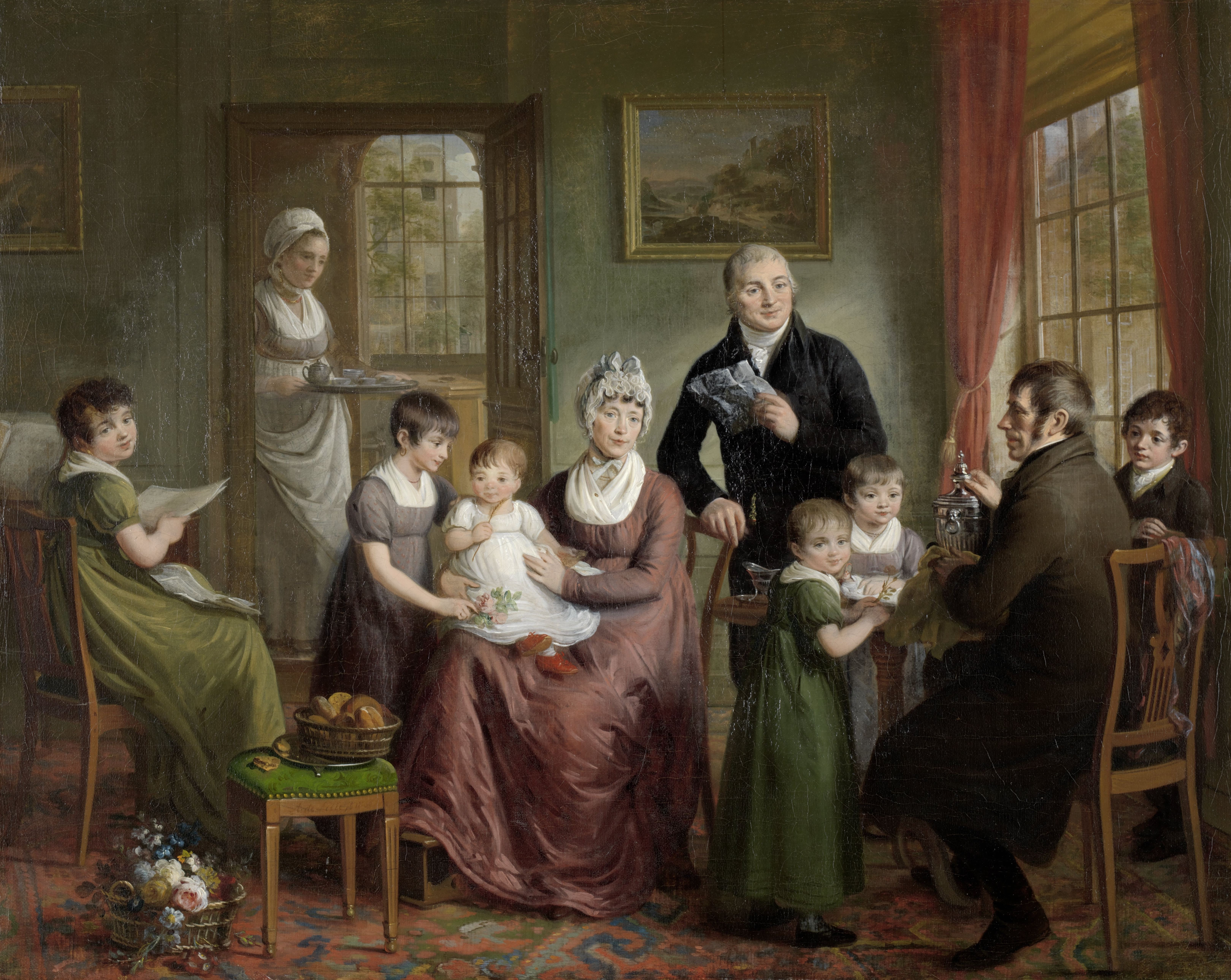
A portrait of the Adrianus Bonebakker family during a visit from - in all probability - partner Diederik Lodewijk Bennewitz (seated, with the silver object). Bonebakker himself can be seen holding a document. A painting by Adriaan de Lelie in 1809, Rijksmuseum Amsterdam.

Bonebakker is the name of a Dutch patrician family.

== History ==
The ancestor Reynier Dircss Boonebacker originally came from the Duchy of Jülich. He settled as a Draper in Utrecht. Members of the family included, for example, the cashier and/or proprietor of the loan bank in Wijk bij Duurstede, Culemborg, Bergen op Zoom, Buren and Tiel. Adrianus Bonebakker decided to settle in Amsterdam in 1792. He partnered up with Diederik Lodewijk Bennewitz to take over a well-known Dutch gold, silver and jewellery shop in 1802, the Peirolet brothers’ business. Initially under the brothers Peirolet, Bennewitz & Bonebakker name and later as Bennewitz & Bonebakker. The partners decided to part company for business reasons in 1821 and Adrianus and his son Jacques Antoine Bonebakker continued the company under the As Bonebakker & Zoon name.

The company produced the keys to the City of Amsterdam for King Lodewijk Napoleon in 1806 and a second set of keys to the City of Amsterdam was handed to Emperor Napoleon Bonaparte during his visit to Amsterdam in 1811. A 491-piece dinner service was produced for Prince Willem II, as well as the royal crown for Willem II in 1840. The maker of this crown, which to this day is still being used during coronation ceremonies, was Theodorus Gerardus Bentvelt.

== Notable members ==
- Adrianus Bonebakker (1767-1842), founder of the Amsterdam gold and silversmith company
- Jacques Antoine Bonebakker (1798-1868), an As Bonebakker & Zoon partner
- Willem Christiaan Bonebakker (1866-1951), banker
- Jan Willem Bonebakker (1893-1989), engineer and Professor in Marine Engineering
- Adrianus Bonebakker (1895-1975), doctor
- Claire Bonebakker (1904-1979), a Dutch painter
