= Regalia of the Netherlands =

Items symbolising the Dutch monarch's authority and dignity

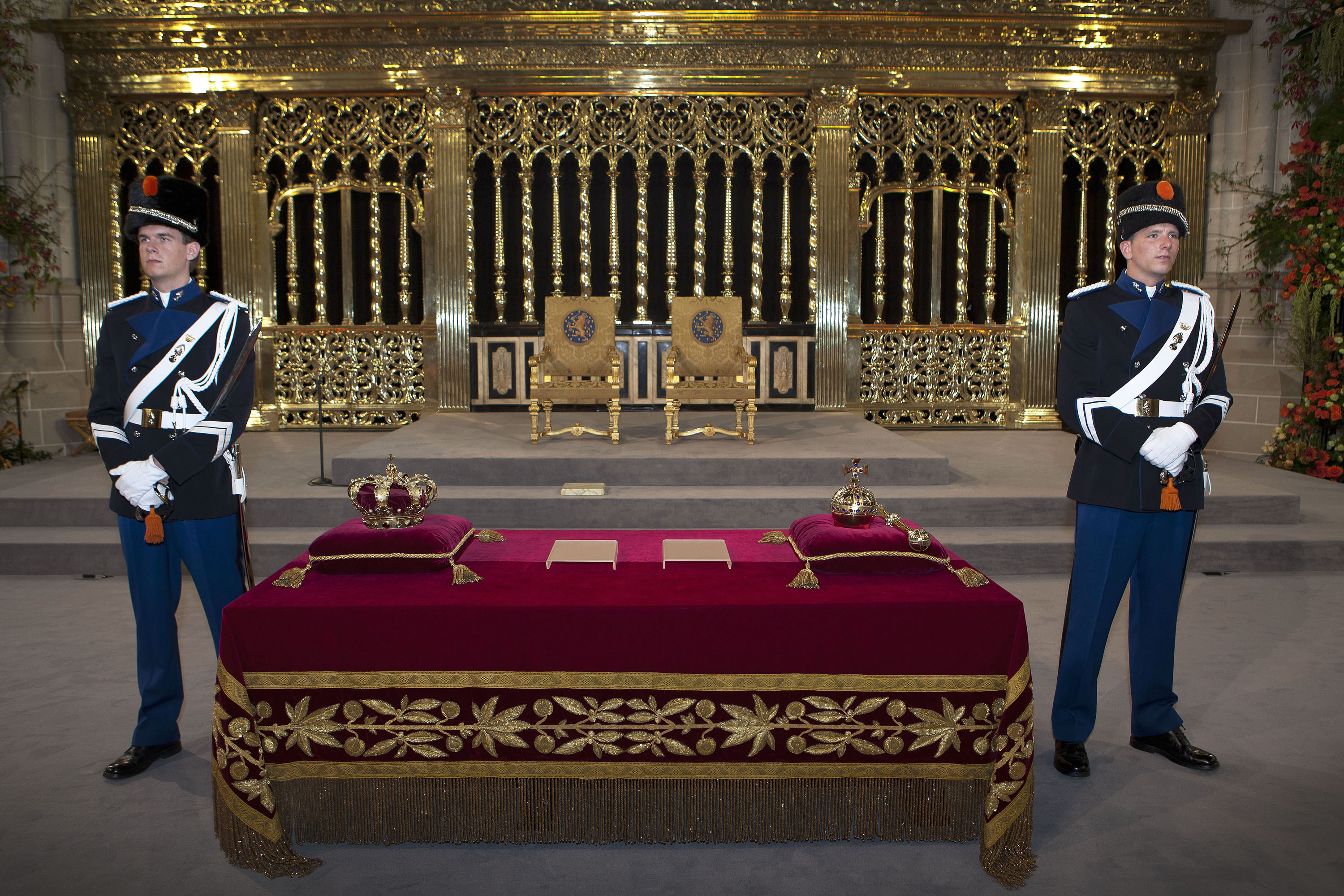
Dutch Royal Regalia in the Nieuwe Kerk in 2013: the crown on the left and the sceptre and orb on the right

The regalia of the Netherlands consists of a number of items symbolising the Dutch monarch's authority and dignity. In comparison to many European monarchies' regalia, the Dutch regalia are relatively new: having been commissioned by King William II in 1840. An earlier, more modest set of regalia made of silver was commissioned by King William I in 1815.

Dutch monarchs are not and have never been crowned but are instead sworn-in and inaugurated in a ceremony at the Nieuwe Kerk in Amsterdam. The regalia are never bestowed upon or worn by the monarch. Instead, the crown, sceptre, and orb are placed on what is called a credence table during the ceremony while the sword and standard are carried by different officials.

A number of jewellery worn by the Dutch royal family are termed as the Crown Jewels and are not part of the regalia, nor is the royal mantle part of the regalia.

== Regalia ==
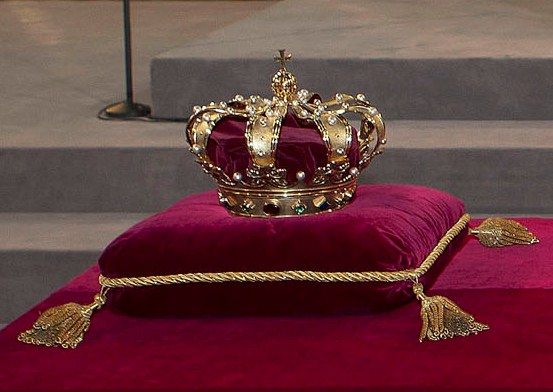
The Crown of the Netherlands

The regalia of the Netherlands consist of the following:

- the crown, symbolising the sovereignty of the Kingdom of the Netherlands, which currently consists of the Netherlands in Western Europe and three overseas countries in the Caribbean: Curaçao, Sint Maarten and Aruba. It also symbolises the dignity of the Sovereign as head of state. The renowned Amsterdam jewelry firm Bonebakker was commissioned to make the crown. The execution was left to master gold- and silversmith Theodorus Gerardus Bentvelt. It is made of gilded silver, adorned with coloured stones and imitations of pearls, and has eight arches with a monde and cross at the top.
- the sceptre, symbolising the reigning King or Queen's authority;
- the orb, symbolising the Sovereign territory;

Both sceptre and orb were made by court jeweler Meijer from The Hague.

- the sword of state, standing for the Monarch's power;
- the gonfalon of state (Rijksvaandel or Rijksbanier), a banner of white moiré silk suspended from a gilded spear, painted with the coat of arms of the Netherlands as decreed on 24 August 1815, symbolising the nation. The arms of the Netherlands have changed since 1815, but the depiction on the gonfalon has not. The artwork was by Bartholomeus van Hove.

During the inauguration, the monarch also wears a royal mantle (Dutch: koningsmantel). The mantle, which is not part of the regalia, is made of purple velvet and is trimmed with ermine. 83 lions, embroidered in gold, adorn the mantle. The mantle was first used in 1815 and has been redesigned several times to fit the various monarchs and reflect the changing fashions. The lions are old and were part of King William I's mantle. Part of the fur has been renewed or replaced. In 1948, the velvet was in such a poor condition after last being used for Wilhelmina's inauguration 50 years earlier that the Swiss couturier who was responsible for its adaptation had no choice but to replace it with a modern fabric.

== Usage ==
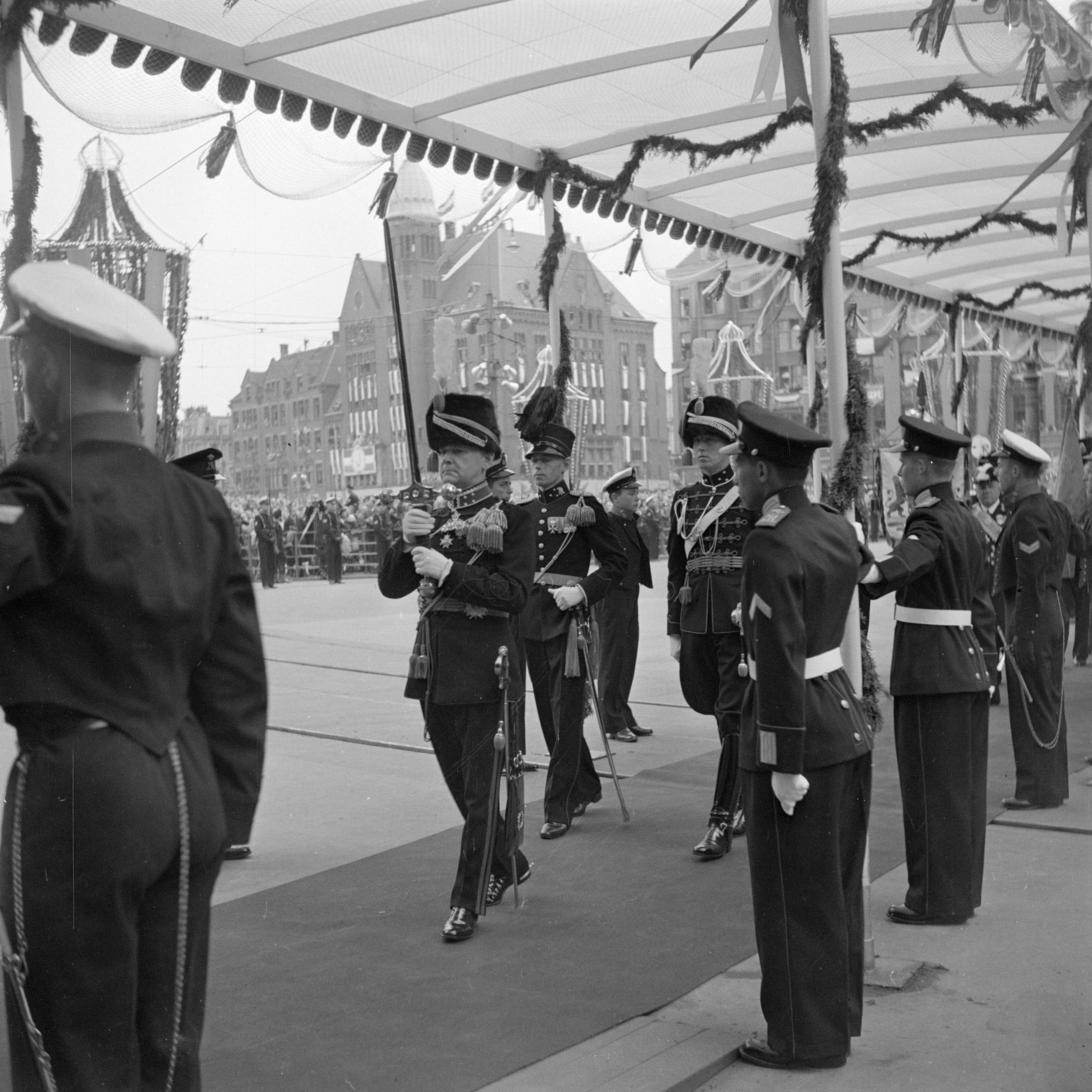
Procession to the inauguration of Queen Juliana in 1948. The sword of state is carried by Lt. Gen. Hendrik Johan Kruls.

Dutch monarchs have never been physically crowned. During royal inaugurations, the crown, sceptre and orb are displayed on a table in the Nieuwe Kerk in Amsterdam, where the inaugurations take place. The Gonfalon of State and Sword of State are carried in the royal procession from Dam Palace to the church and are held on either side of the royal dais in the church during the swearing in ceremony.

== Literature ==
- Dieuwke Grĳpma; Kleren voor de elite, 1999 ISBN 9789050184472
