= Jan Nieuwenhuyzen =

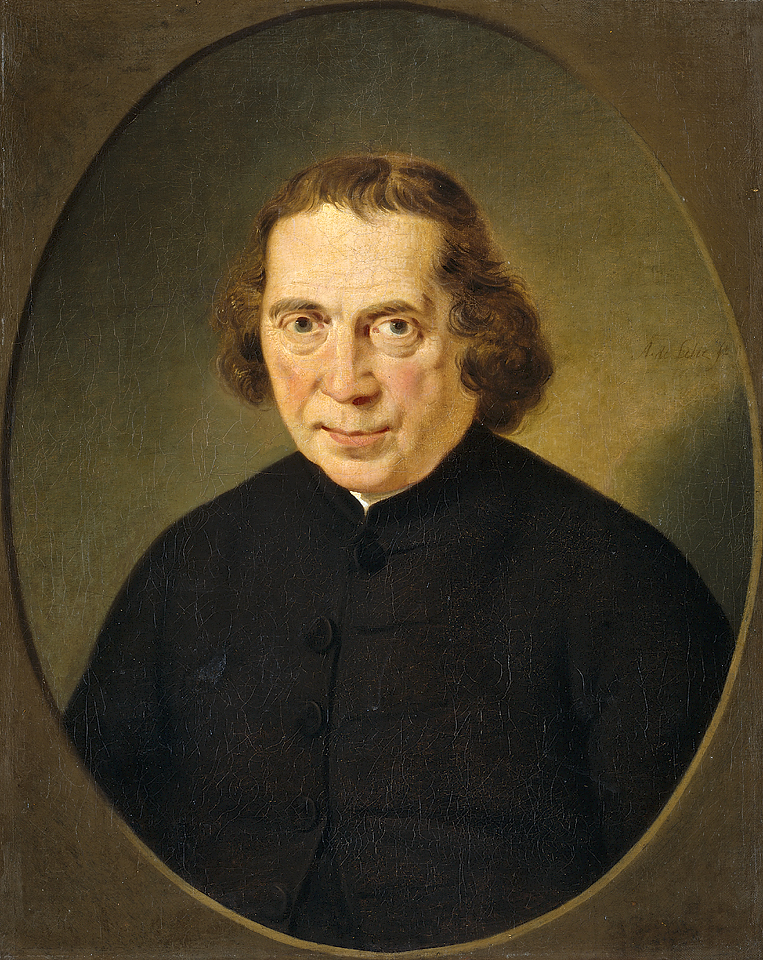
Jan Nieuwenhuyzen, by Adriaan de Lelie

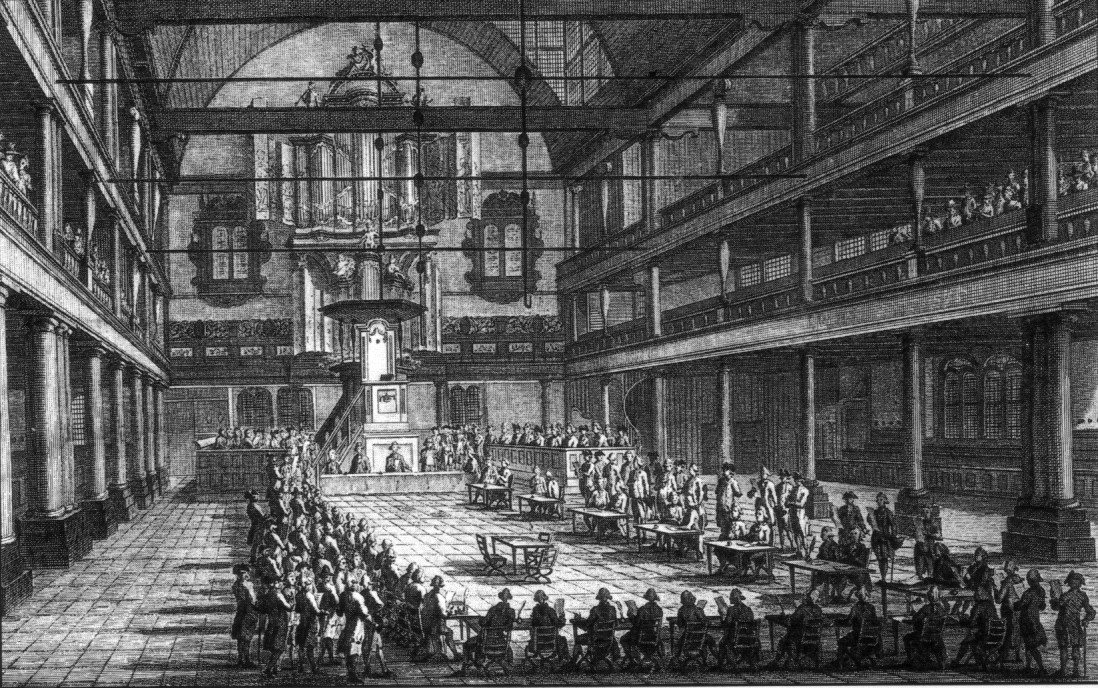
First meeting of "Het Nut" in the old Lutheran church in Amsterdam in 1791.

Jan Nieuwenhuijzen (1 September 1724 in Haarlem – 24 February 1806 in Monnickendam) was a Dutch Mennonite teacher and minister.

He was first trained to be a book seller and in 1743 he entered the guild in Haarlem. He married the poet Gezina Wijnalda, a niece of Age Wijnalda in 1751. He then sold his printing offices in 1758 after training at the Mennonite seminary in Amsterdam to become a minister. He served in Middelharnis 1758–1763, Aardenburg 1763–1771, and Monnikendam 1771–1806. In 1784, along with his son Martinus who became a doctor in Edam, he founded the society "Genoodschap van Konsten en Wetenschappen, onder de zinspreuk: Tot Nut van 't Algemeen", most often called Maatschappij tot Nut van't Algemeen, or simply Het Nut.
