= Willem van Leen =

Dutch painter

- Born: 19 February 1753; Dordrecht
- Died: 6 April 1825 (aged 72)

Willem van Leen (1753 – 1825) was a Dutch painter.

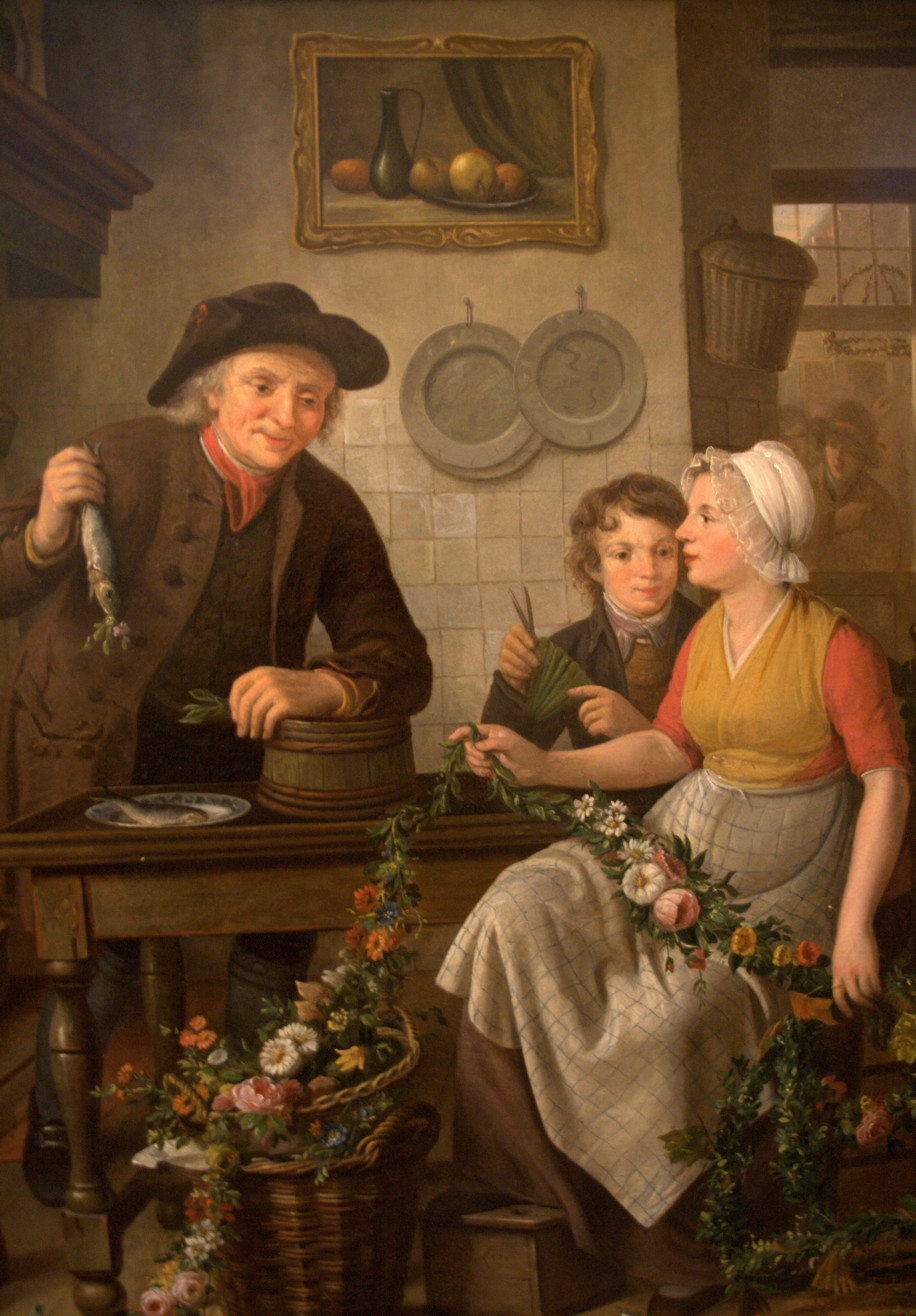
Preparing for Hollandse Nieuwe, a collaboration with his friend Adriaen de Lelie

Leen was born in Dordrecht and became a specialist in flower painting. He is known primarily for his interior decorations for mantelpieces, overdoors, etc. He also collaborated with other painters to paint flowers and fruit in their paintings.

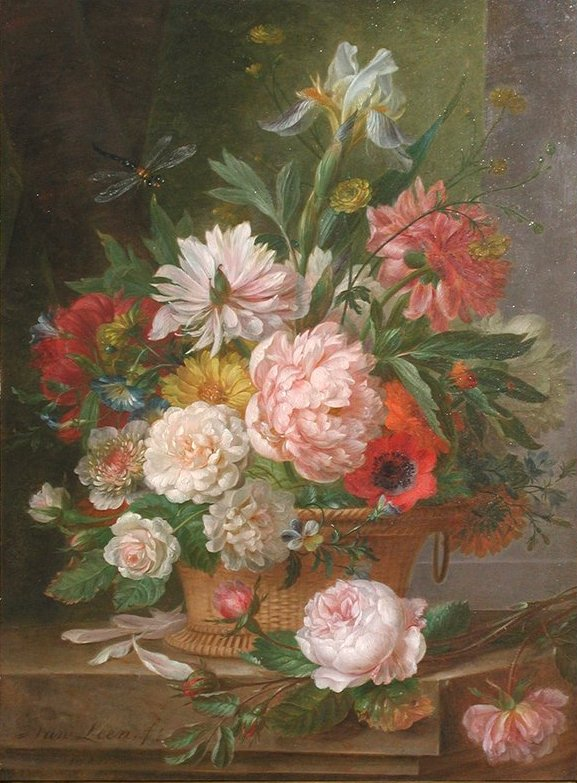
Flowers in a Vase, private collection

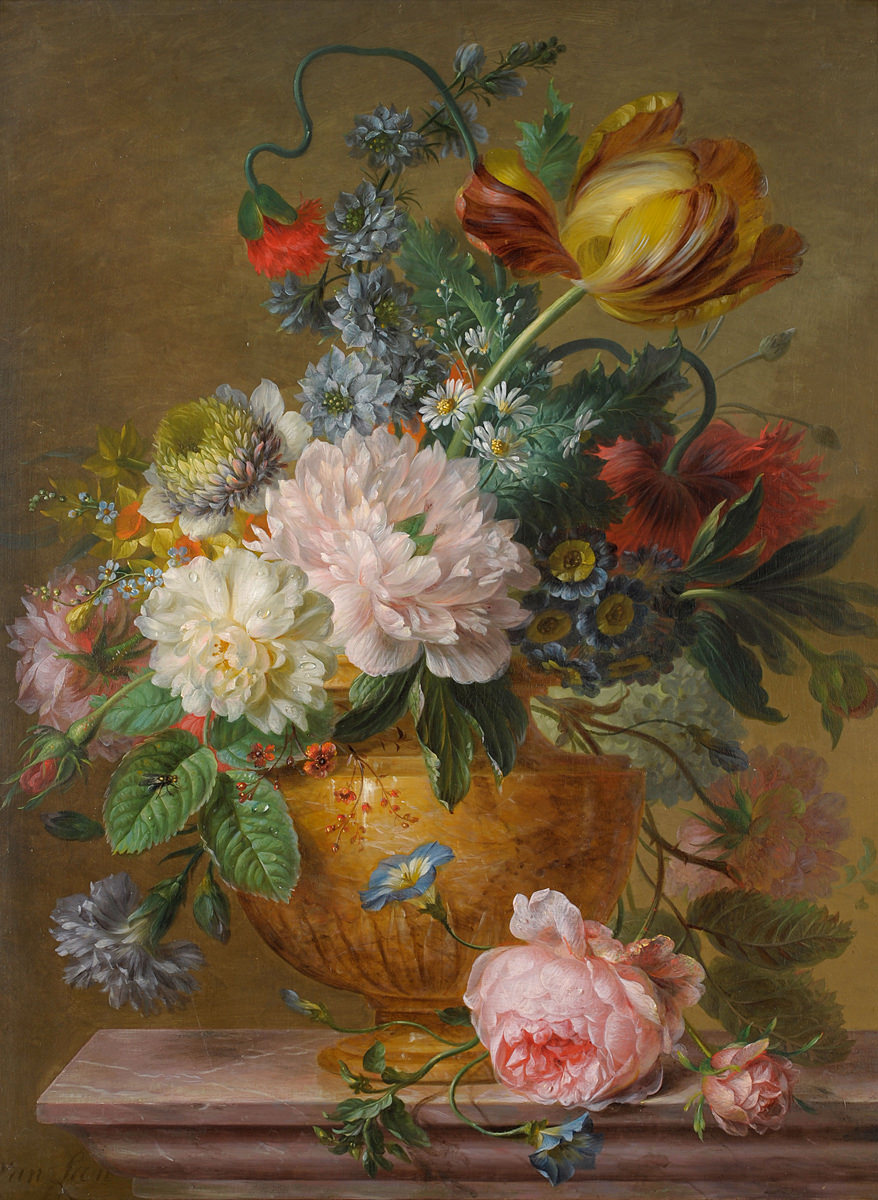
Still-life of Flowers, private collection
