= Crown Jewels of the Netherlands =

Dutch royal jewels

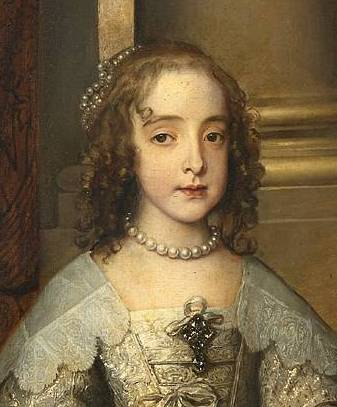
Mary of England with the famous Orange Pearls

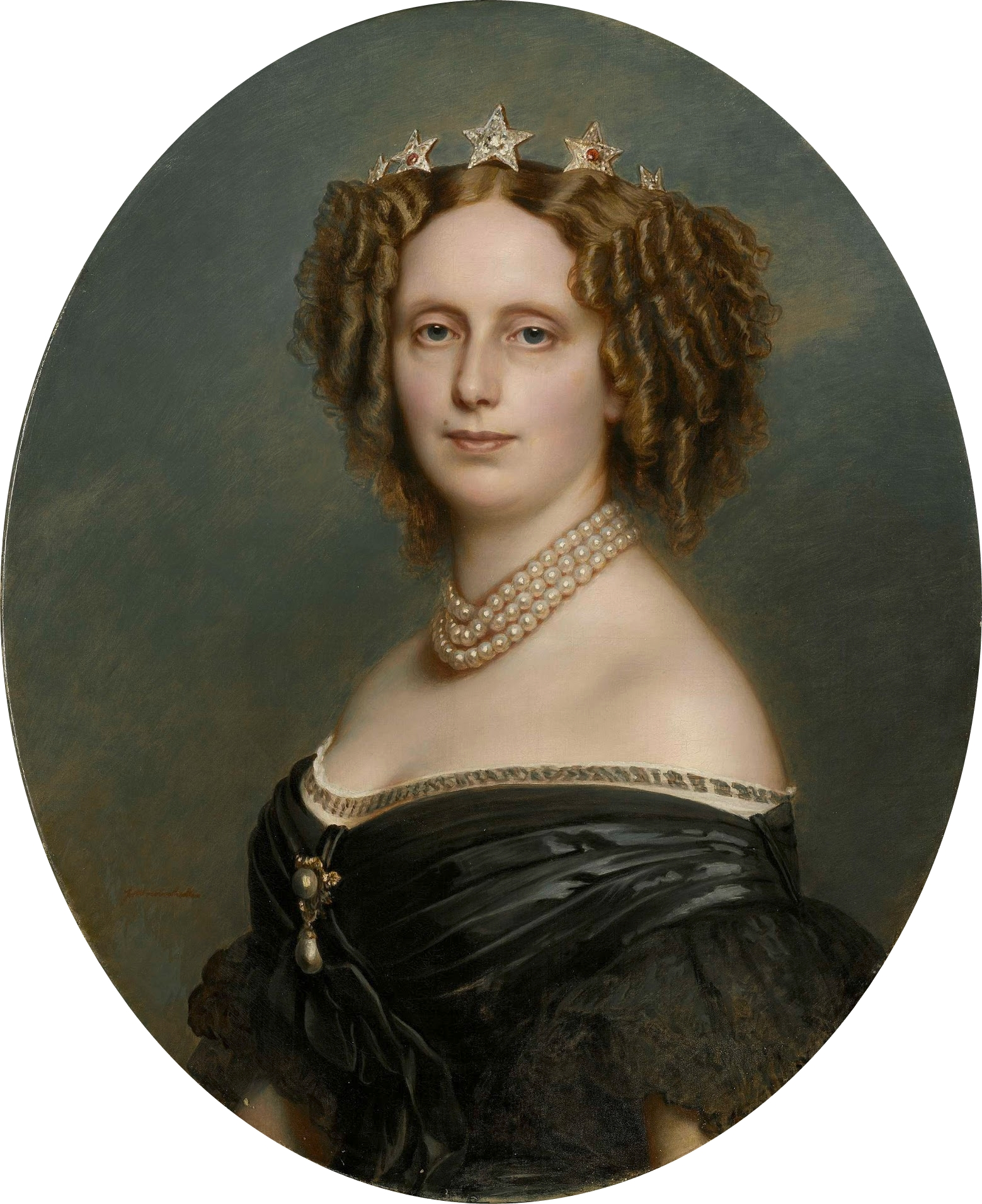
Sophie of Württemberg with her 113 pearls. They were sold by her eldest son and were auctioned in 1904 for 855 000 Francs

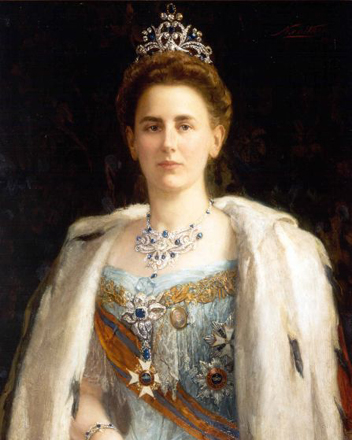
Queen Wilhelmina with the parure of diamonds and sapphires that were a wedding-present from the Dutch people

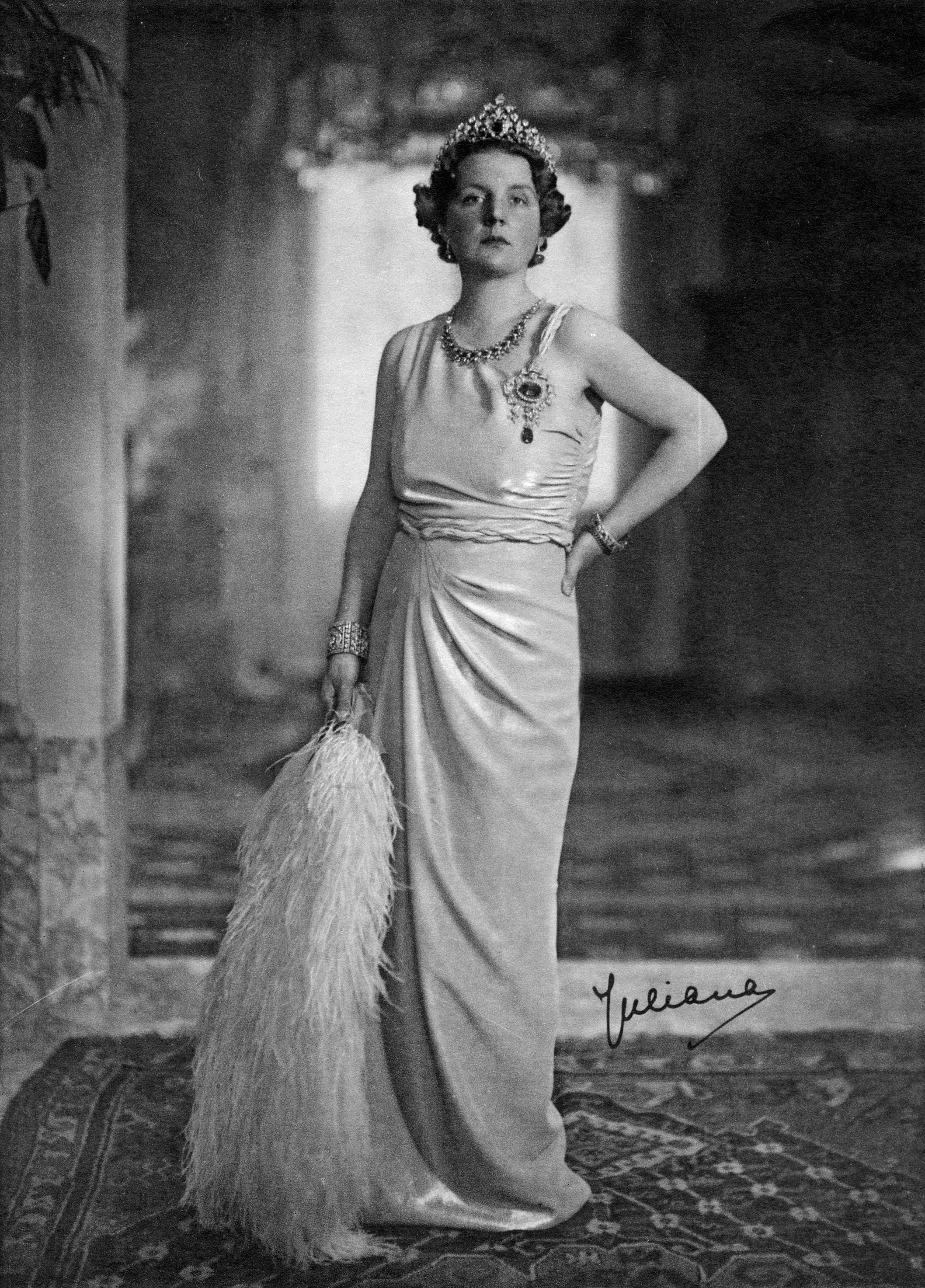
Queen Juliana shows the Garuda bracelet on her right-arm.

Crown Jewels of the Netherlands is the jewellery used by the Dutch royal family, which is sometimes dubbed "crown jewels". In the past, the terms "House-diamonds", "House-jewels" (Will of William I in 1841, Art. 12) and "family jewels" (1784 in the will of William V) have been used. In 1790 the term "Bijoux de la Couronne" was used by Luise of Brunswick -Wolfenbüttel to refer to a large diamond from Borneo. In 1896 the Firm of van Kempen & Begeer wrote about resetting the jewels of the Crown ("juweelen der kroon"). Queen Juliana gave a selection of her formal jewelry to the new Foundation Regalia of the House of Orange-Nassau, instituted on 27 July 1963. In 1968 a Foundation "Kroongoederen van het Huis van Oranje-Nassau" was instituted. It owns the regalia and the House-jewels.

The Houses of Orange and Nassau have a collection of jewels, including diamonds and pearls. The famous Small Sancy diamond of 34 carat was bought by Frederik Hendrik, and is now in the collection of the Prussian Royal Family. These collections have been dispersed several times. After the death of William III in 1702 there were several heirs in Germany, descendants of his grandfather Prince Frederick Henry. The famous Orange pearls were sent to Prussia. In the 19th century the daughters and granddaughters of William I and the daughter of William II were given a large collection of jewels when they married. The jewels are now by inheritance in the collections of the royal and princely families of Sweden, Denmark, Prussia and Saxen-Weimar. Consecutive Princes of Orange and Kings of the Netherlands have tried to institute a collection of crown-jewels that were a fideï-commis and were therefore inseparable but they did not succeed. It was King William III of the Netherlands who decided that a number of gems and jewels were to be "the diamonds of the Crown". They were to be reserved for the ruling monarch and his consort.

Amongst these "crown jewels" are large and old fashioned tiaras, devants de corsage and necklaces set with large emeralds, sapphires, diamonds and rubies. They are sometimes worn during state-banquets.

The most impressive solitaire in the collection is a light blue drop shape rose-cut Indian diamond that once belonged to Mary, Princess Royal and Princess of Orange. It is as "large as the egg of a dove and as clear as water". It has now been worn again by queen Maxima after spending decades in the royal vaults. The diamond has no official name but it has been referred to as the "Stuart" or "Holland" diamond in the past. It was set in a tiara in 1897 by Jeweller Eduard Schürmann & Co. in Frankfurt. The diamond weighs about 40 crt, the entire tiara weighs 2400 gr.

The sets of diamonds, rubies and sapphires given to Queen Wilhelmina and Queen Juliana were not legally part of these collection. The set of jewels containing 800 diamonds and the famous "Garuda" bracelet from the Dutch East Indies that were given to the then Princess Juliana were broken up after their deaths. The stones are now part of several earrings, brooches and other jewels.

During World War II the Dutch Crown Jewels were flown for safekeeping from The Hague to the UK and were kept in the vaults of Wolverhampton Town Hall. The Princess Irene Brigade who were members of the Dutch Army were stationed at Wrottesley Park, Wolverhampton during the war.

== Bibliography ==
- René Brus; De juwelen van het Huis Oranje-Nassau, Haarlem 1996.
