= Adrianus Bonebakker =

Dutch gold and silver smith

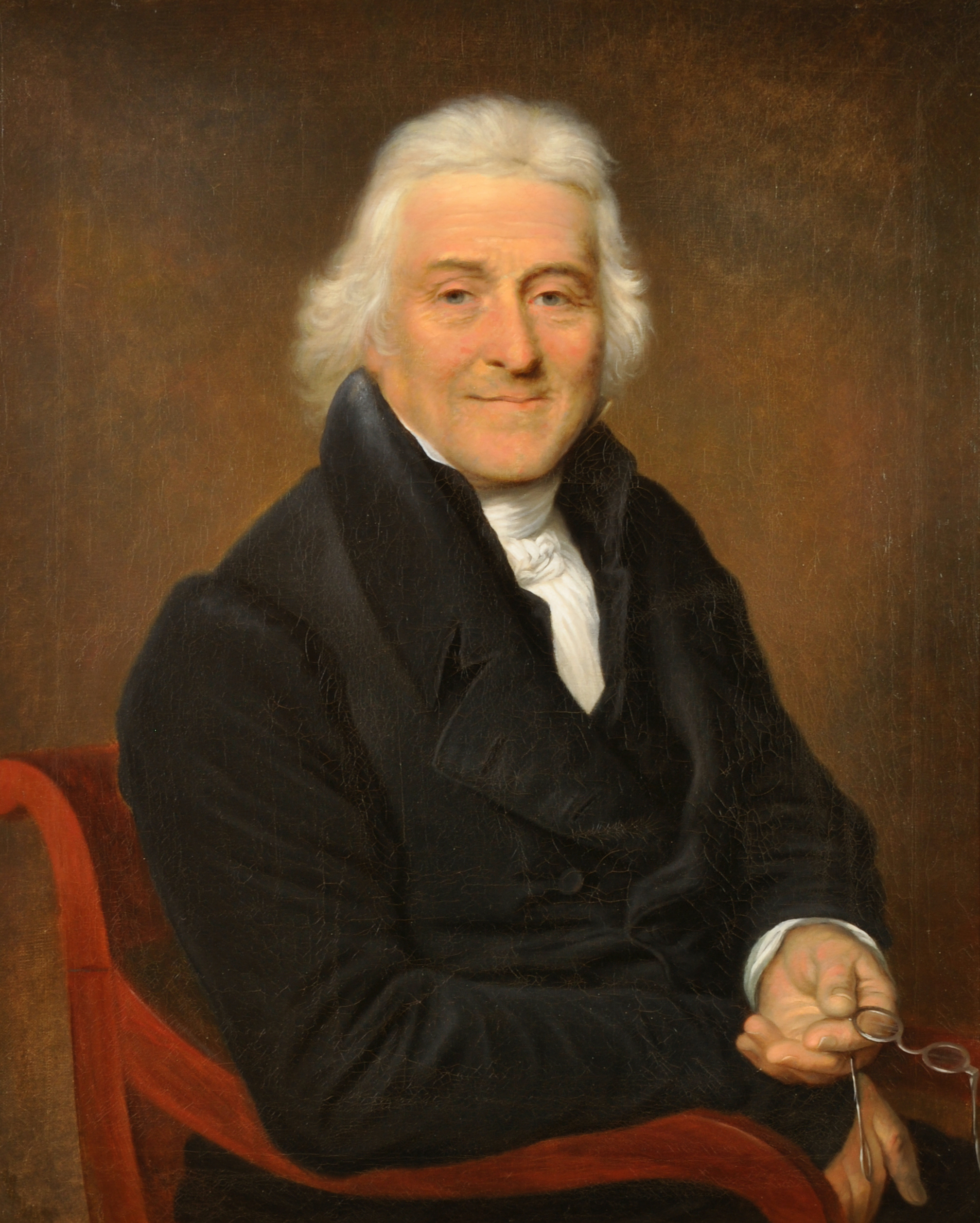
- Portrait by an unknown painter
- Born: 27 May 1767; Tiel
- Died: 31 March 1842 (aged 74); Amsterdam

Adrianus Bonebakker (27 May 1767 in Tiel – 31 March 1842 in Amsterdam) was a Dutch goldsmith, silversmith and jeweller.

== Biography ==
Bonebakker was baptised as the son of Anthonij Bo[o]nebakker (1730–1797) and Maria Cornelia van Oosterhoudt (1734–1820) in Tiel on 31 May 1767. His father was the proprietor of the loan bank in Buren and Tiel. He moved to Amsterdam, where he completed his Master's in silversmithing in 1792. That same year Bonebakker married Elisabeth du Pré (1760–1811). Seven daughters and a son, Jacques Antoine Bonebakker (1798–1868), were born from this marriage. Bonebakker partnered up with Diederik Lodewijk Bennewitz to take over a well-known Dutch gold, silver and jewellery shop in 1802, the Peirolet brothers’ business. Initially under the brothers Peirolet, Bennewitz & Bonebakker name and later as Bennewitz & Bonebakker. He remarried in 1818, this time with Wijnanda Lucretia Tijdeman (1770–1826). He became a member of the Royal Academy of Visual Arts around 1820.

=== Bennewitz & Bonebakker ===
Bennewitz was tasked with managing the workshop within the Bennewitz and Bonebakker company. Bonebakker took responsibility for the business side of things. Although he was registered as a silversmith, Adrianus Bonebakker is not known to have produced any of his own work, according to the Dutch Institute for Art History. The work was outsourced to gold and silversmiths like T.G. Bentvelt, J.A. de Haas, A.H. Pape, D.W. Rethmeyer, H.P. La Ruelle and J.H. Stellingwerff. Prestigious assignments during this period included, for example, the ones commissioned by the City of Amsterdam to produce the so-called city keys. These keys to the City of Amsterdam were produced in 1806 to be offered to King Lodewijk Napoleon as he entered the city. Circumstances dictated this didn't actually happen until 1808. The same set of keys was used in 1813 during King Willem I's entry. A second set of keys to Amsterdam was produced in 1811 and handed to Napoleon Bonaparte on 9 October of that year. Both sets were made by Bennewitz. The second set wasn't paid for by Amsterdam until four years later. The original keys now form part of the Amsterdam Museum's collection. The company was commissioned by the City of Amsterdam to produce Prince Willem (later King Willem II) and Anna Paulowna's wedding gift in 1816. This gift consisted of a 419-piece dinner service, an important part of which can still be admired in the Rijksmuseum in Amsterdam.

=== As Bonebakker & Zoon ===
The partners decided to part company in 1821 for business reasons, after which Bennewitz launched the Bennewitz & Zonen company and Bonebakker and his son continued under the As Bonebakker & Zoon name. The company was commissioned by King Willem II to make the royal crown in 1840. The maker of this crown, which to this day is still being used during coronation ceremonies, was Theodorus Gerardus Bentvelt. The company still exists today, under the Bonebakker name.

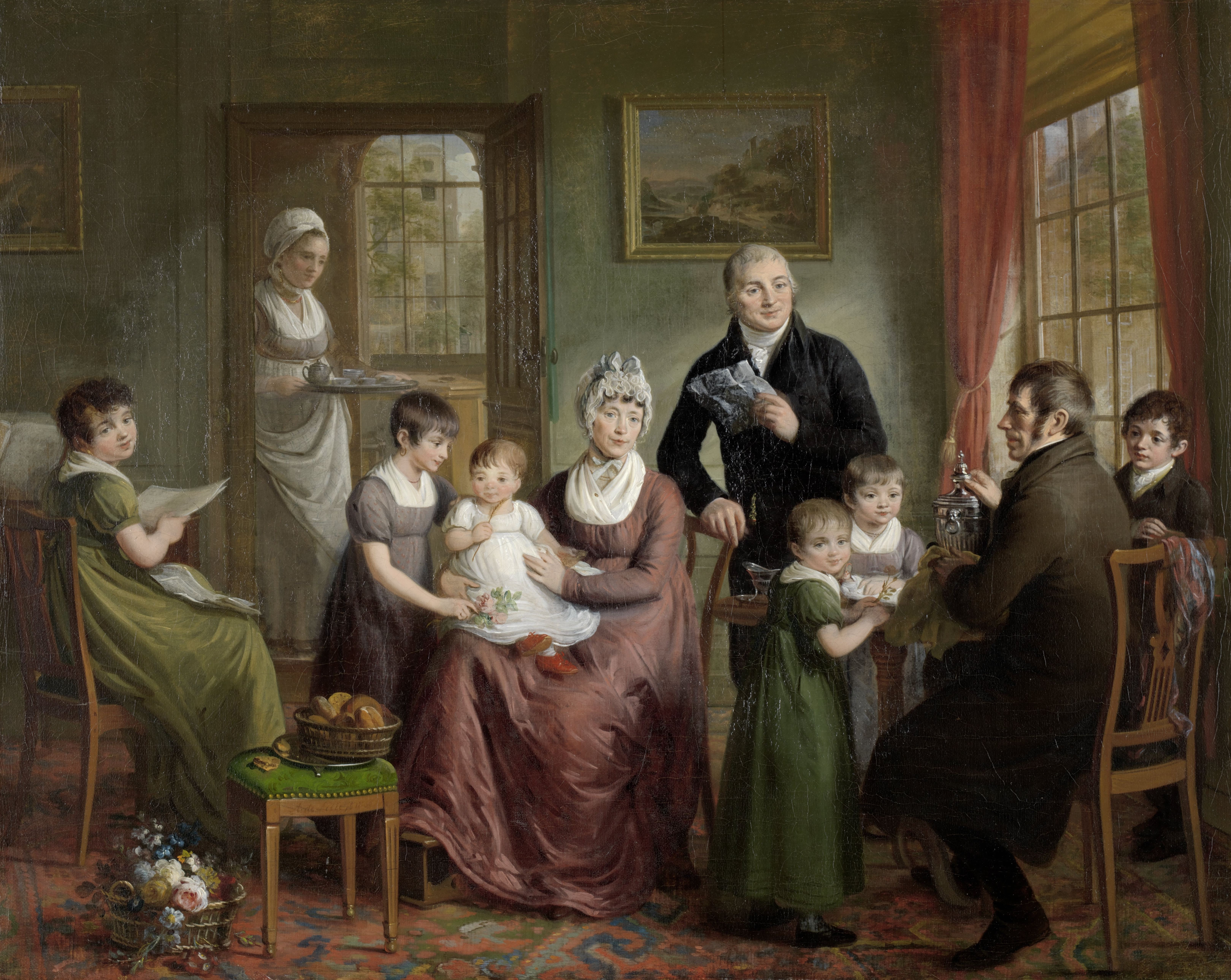
A portrait of the Adrianus Bonebakker family during a visit from - in all probability - partner Diederik L. Bennewitz (seated, with the silver object). Bonebakker himself can be seen holding a document. Painting by Adriaan de Lelie (1809), Rijksmuseum Amsterdam.

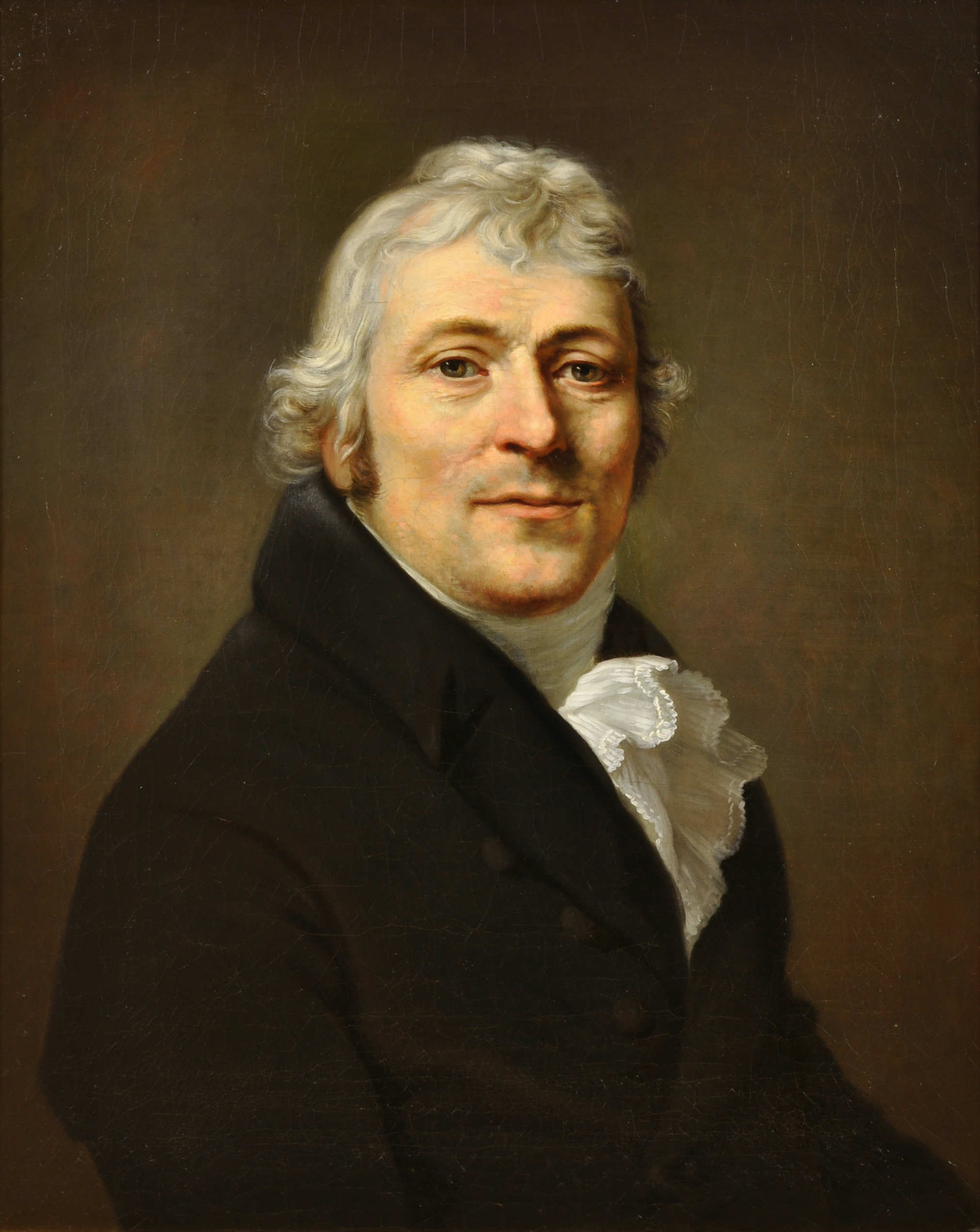
Adrianus Bonebakker (1767-1842)

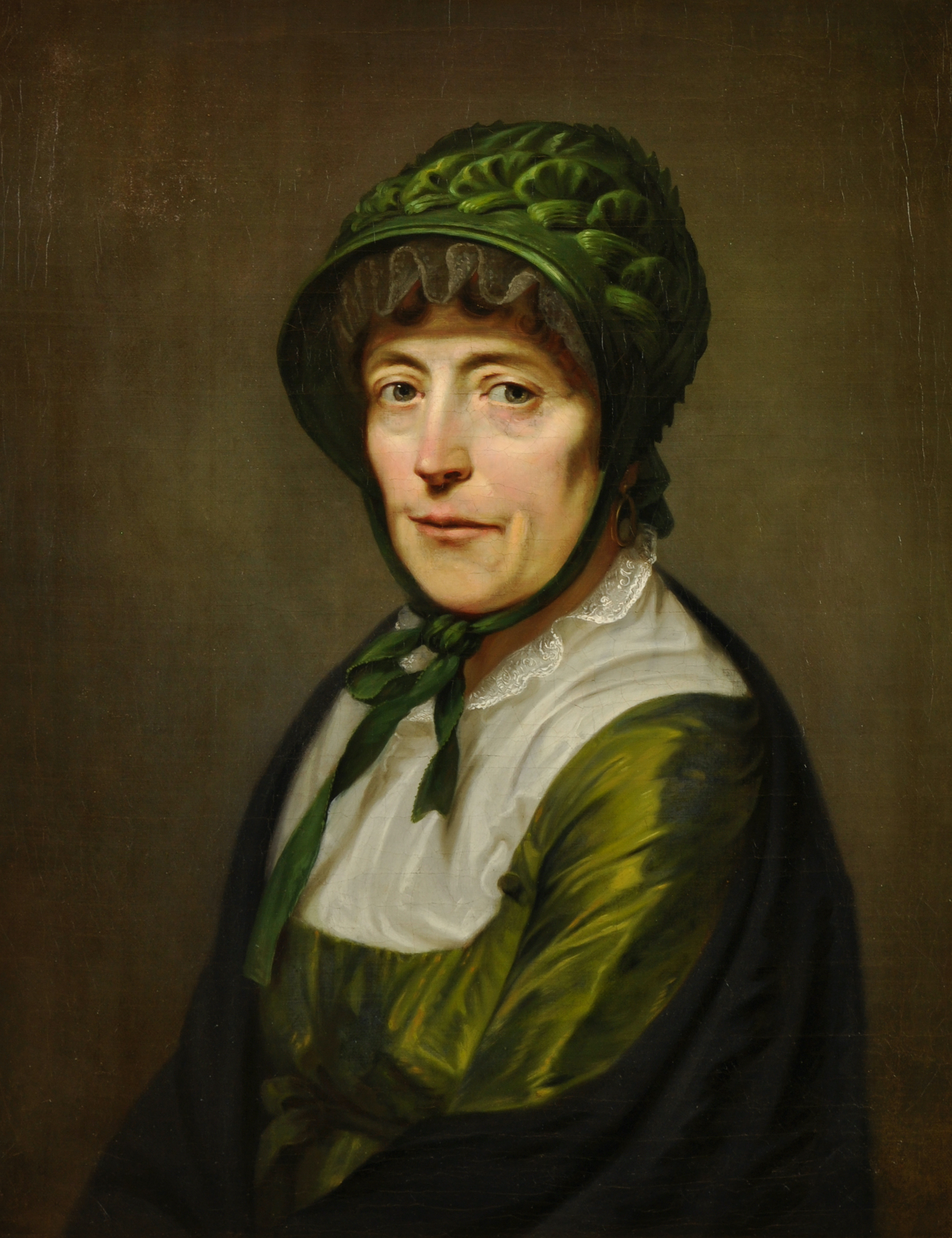
Elisabeth du Pré (1760-1811), Adrianus Bonebakker's first wife

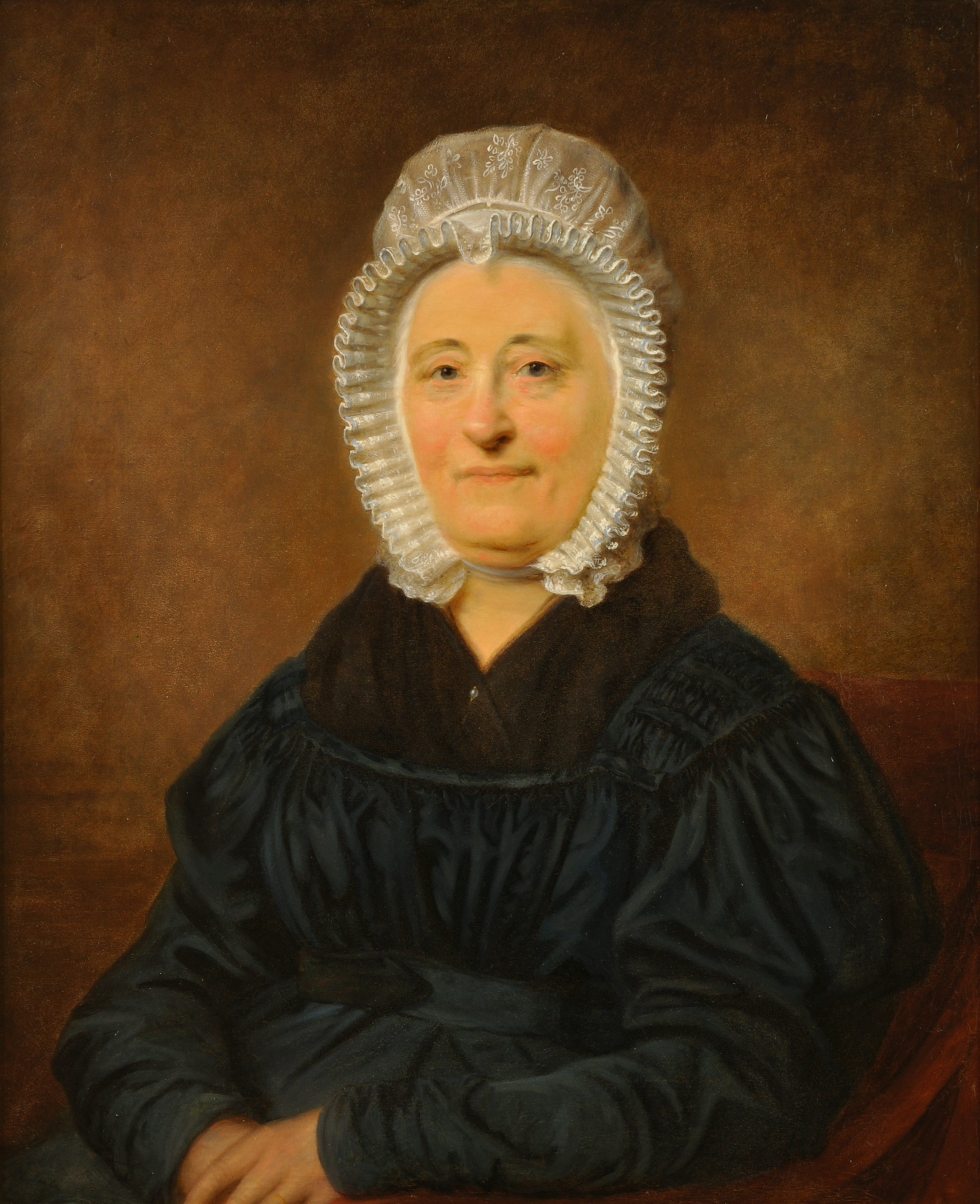
Wijnanda Lucretia Tydeman (1770-1826), Adrianus Bonebakker's second wife
