= Adriaan de Lelie =

Dutch painter (1755–1820)

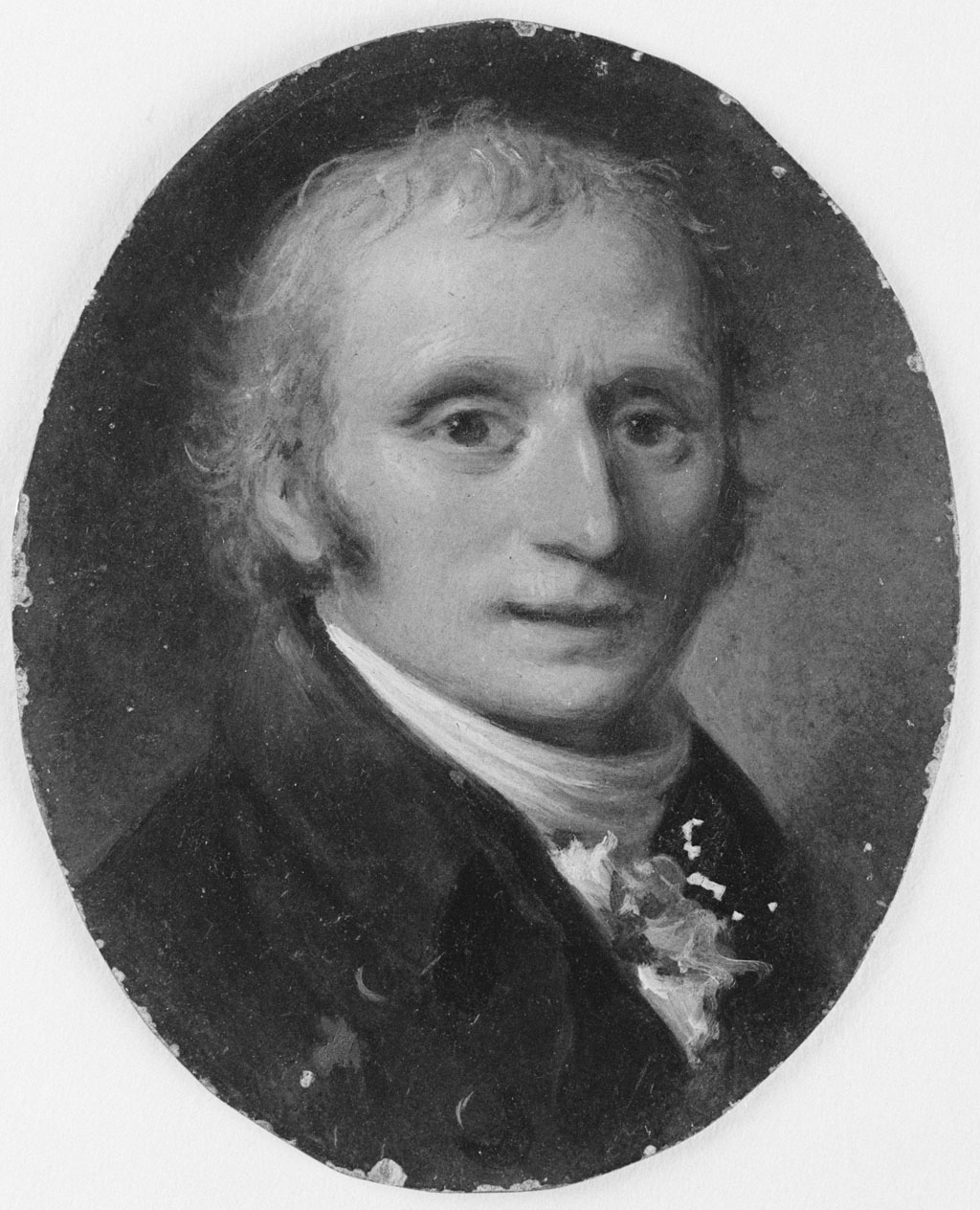
- Self-portrait
- Born: May 19, 1755; Tilburg
- Died: November 30, 1820 (aged 65); Amsterdam
- Known for: Painting portraits and cabinet pictures

Adriaan de Lelie (19 May 1755 – 30 November 1820) was a Dutch painter. Born in Tilburg, De Lelie was a pupil of A. Peeters, a painter of tapestries and ornaments, and afterwards of Andreas Bernardus de Quertenmont in Antwerp. He made copies of many portraits by Rubens and van Dyck in Düsseldorf, and also of historical pictures by Italian and Dutch masters. On the advice of Professor Camper, he established himself in Amsterdam.

He painted a great number of portraits and cabinet pictures. The latter includes one of the celebrated art lover Jan Gildemeester in the act of showing his collection to a party of ladies and gentlemen. One of his best works is that of the "Drawing Academy" of the Felix Meritis Society in Amsterdam. His pictures are highly esteemed in the Netherlands and Germany, where they can be found in distinguished collections.

His pupils were Jean Augustin Daiwaille, Jan Adriaan Antonie de Lelie, François Montauban van Swijndregt, Pièrre Recco, Izaak Riewert Schmidt, and Johannes Ziesenis.

He died in Amsterdam, aged 65.

== Gallery ==
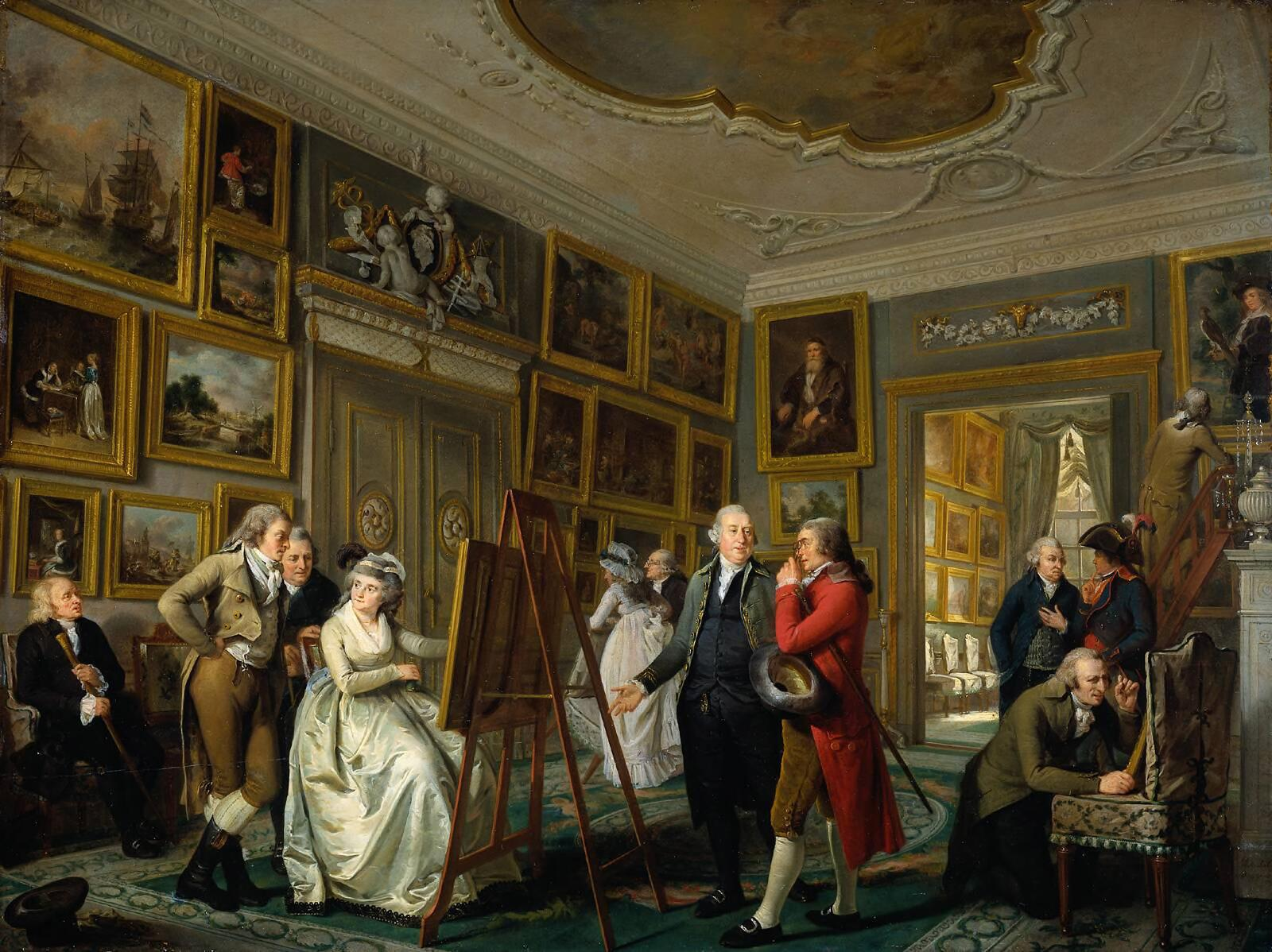
The Art Gallery of Jan Gildemeester Jansz, 1794–1795, Rijksmuseum Amsterdam

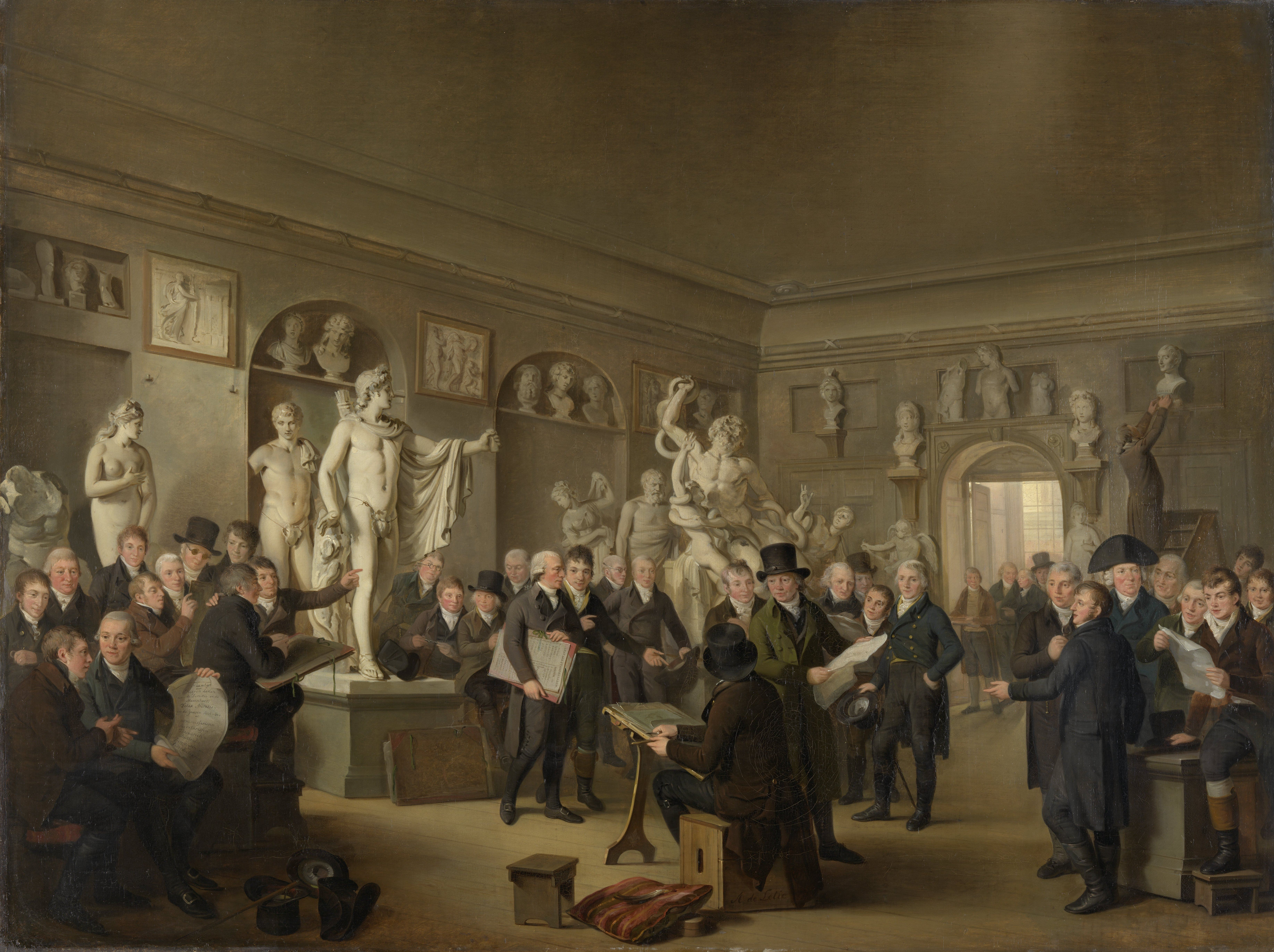
In the sculpture gallery of the Felix Meritis Society, 1806–1809, Rijksmuseum Amsterdam

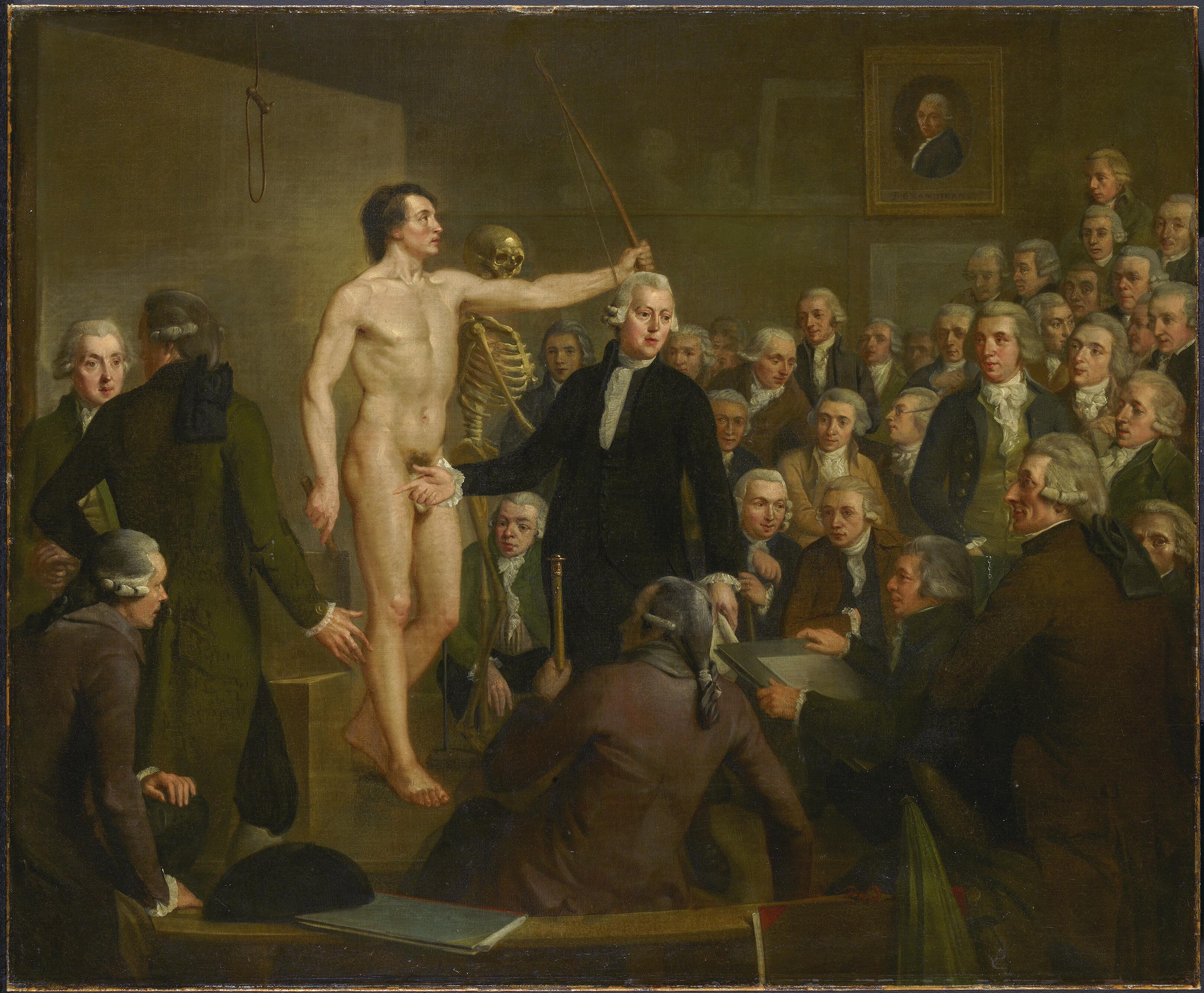
Andreas Bonn lectures the Drawing Academy of the Felix Meritis Society, 1792, Amsterdam Museum

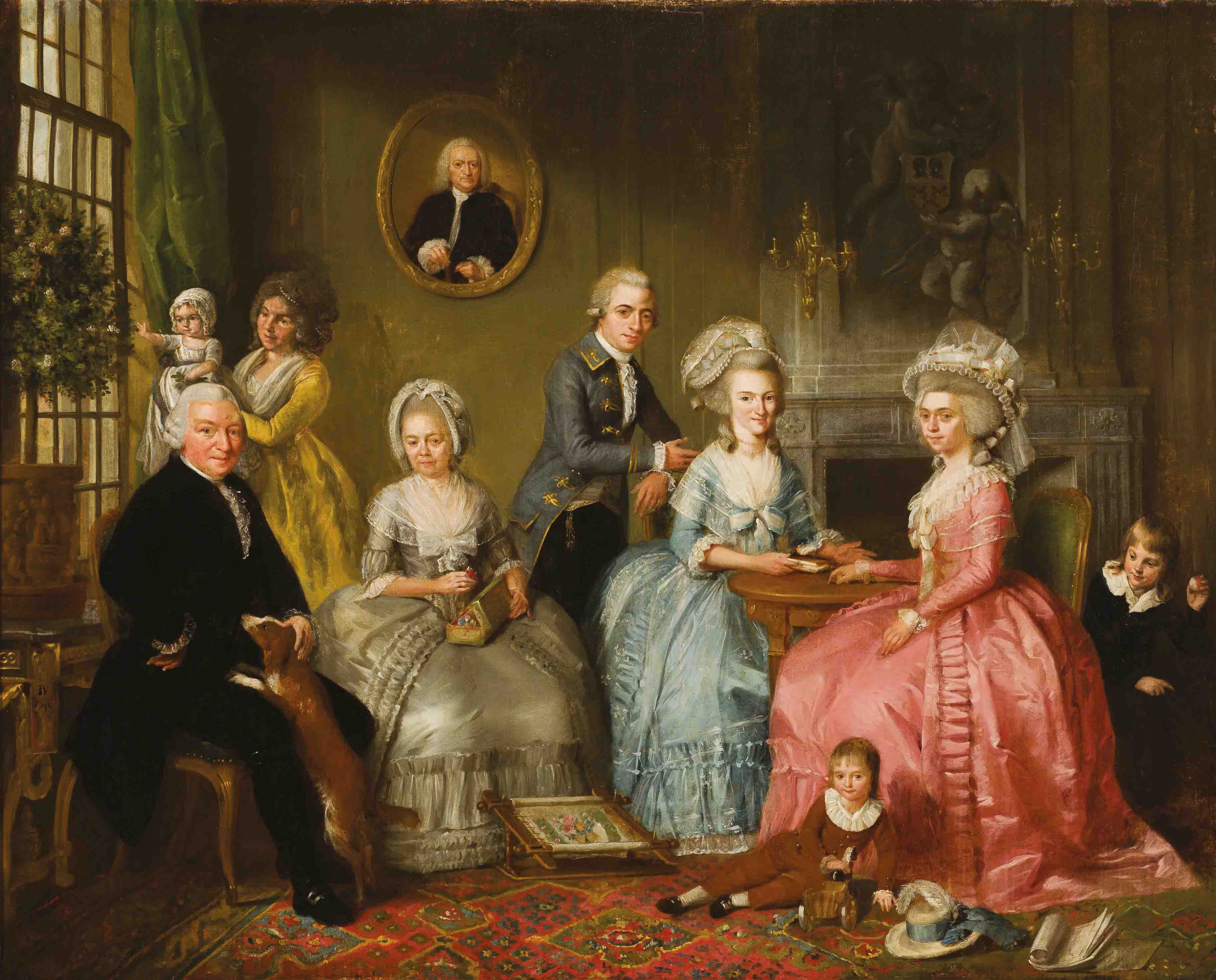
The family of Jan van Loon, 1786, Museum Van Loon

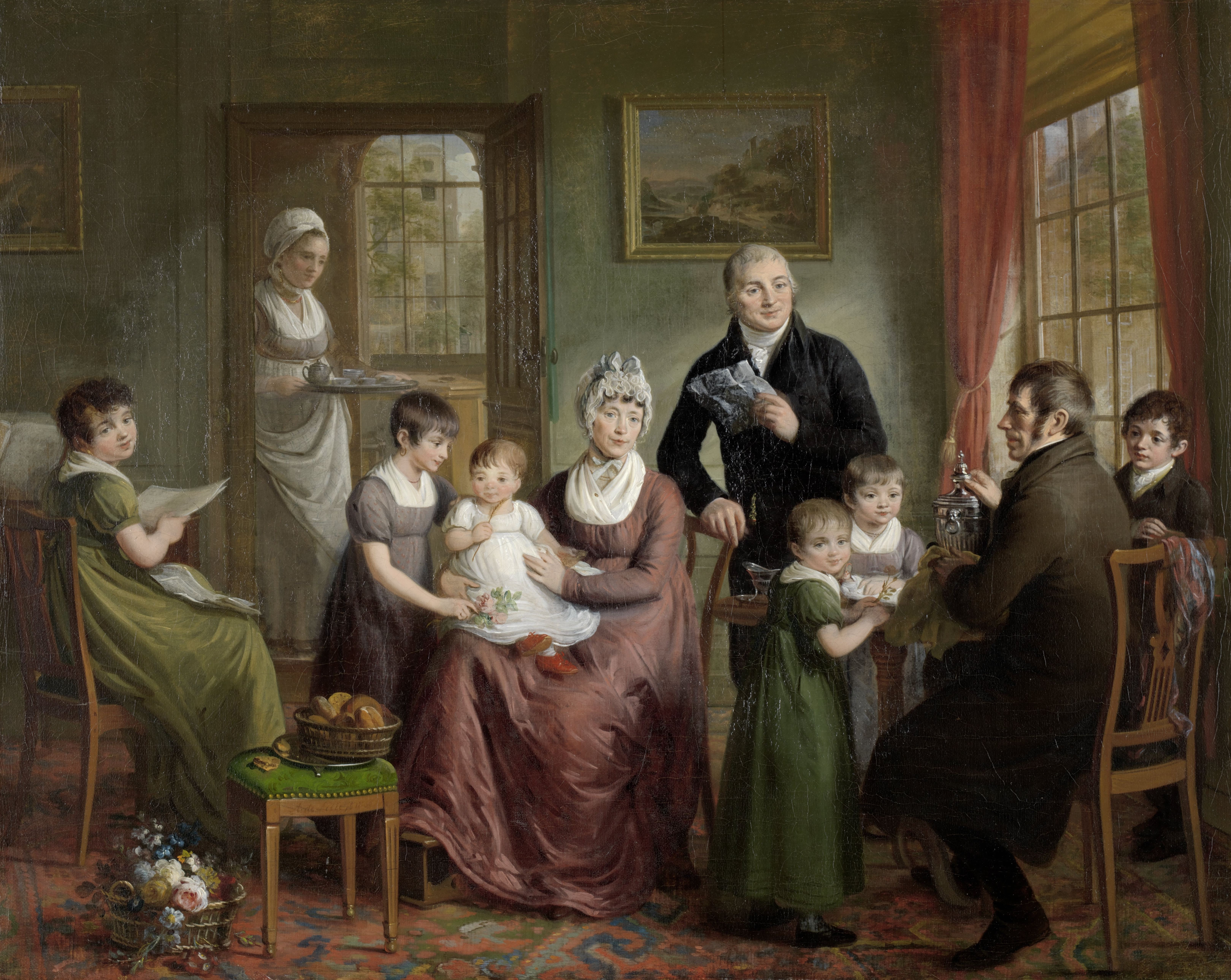
The family of Adrianus Bonebakker during a visit from – in all probability – partner Diederik Lodewijk Bennewitz (seated, with the silver object). Bonebakker himself can be seen holding a document, 1809, Rijksmuseum Amsterdam

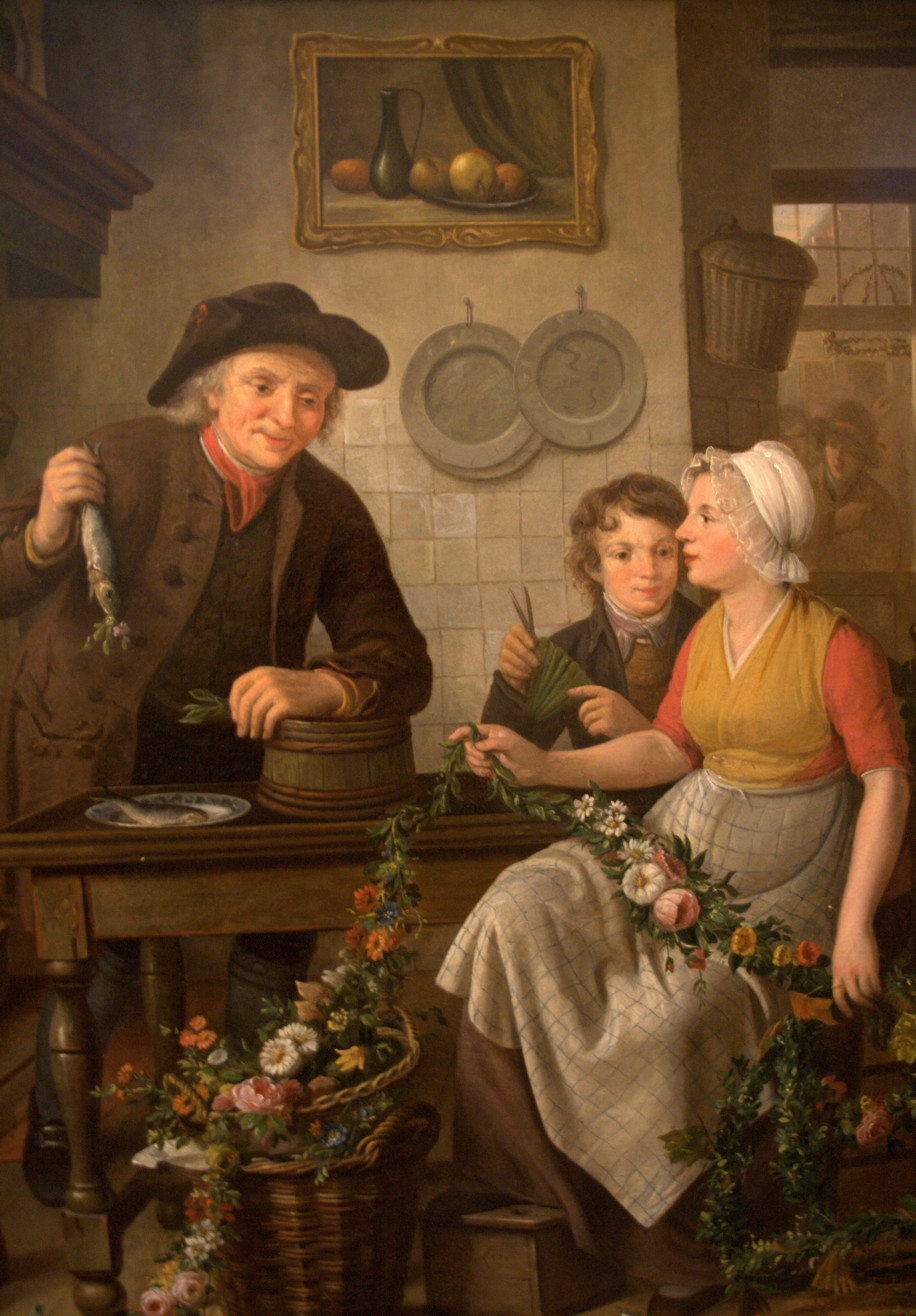
Preparing for the sale of the new herring, by de Lelie and Willem van Leen, 1815, in the Visserijmuseum in Vlaardingen

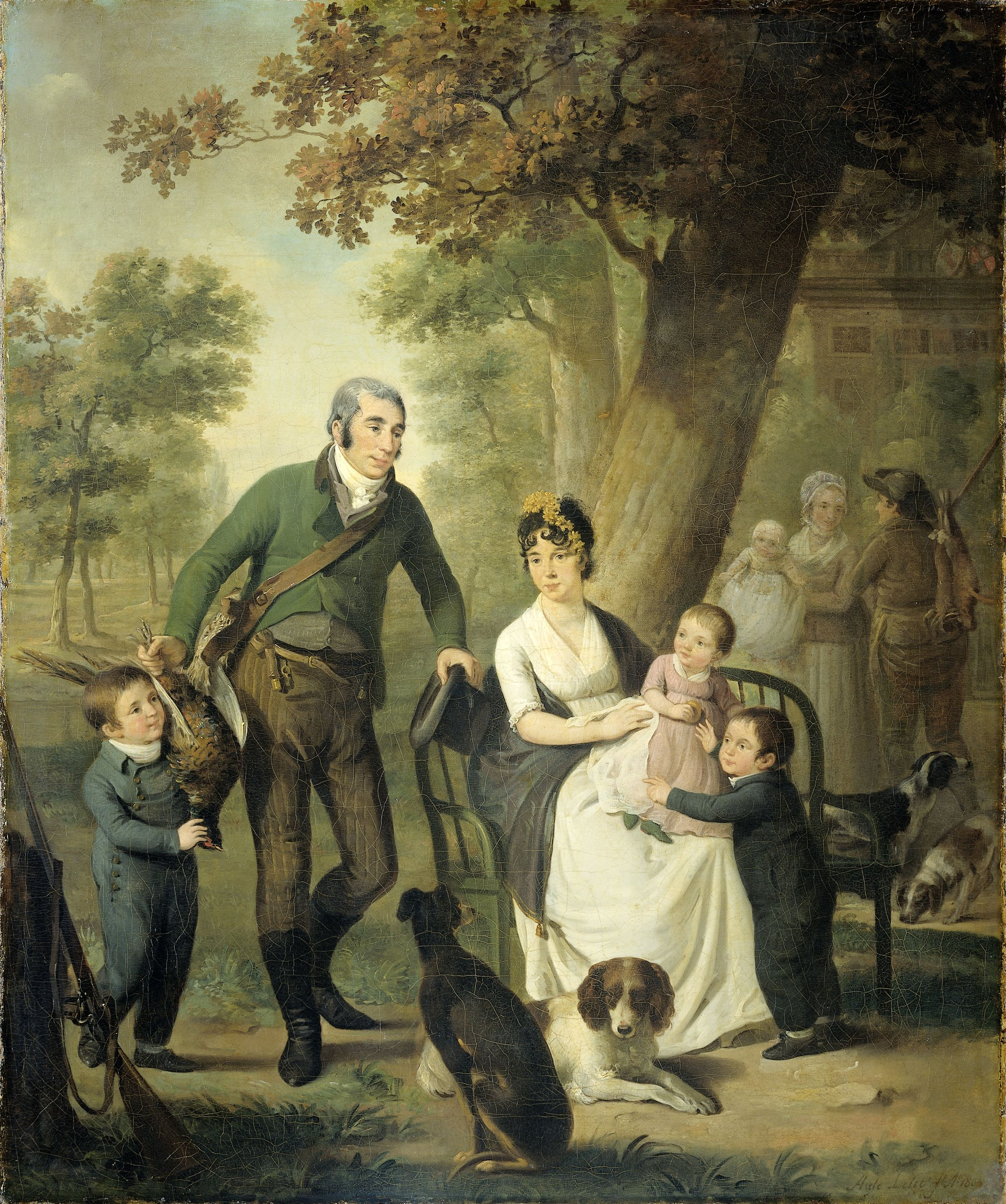
The family of Van Brienen van Ramerus, 1804

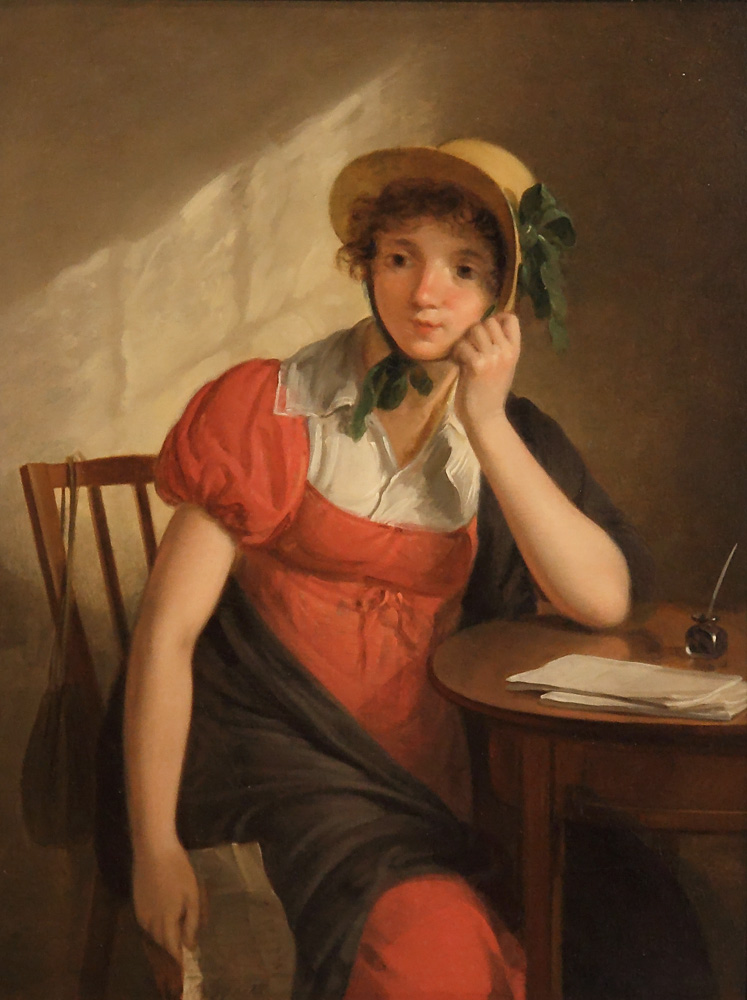
A girl with a letter

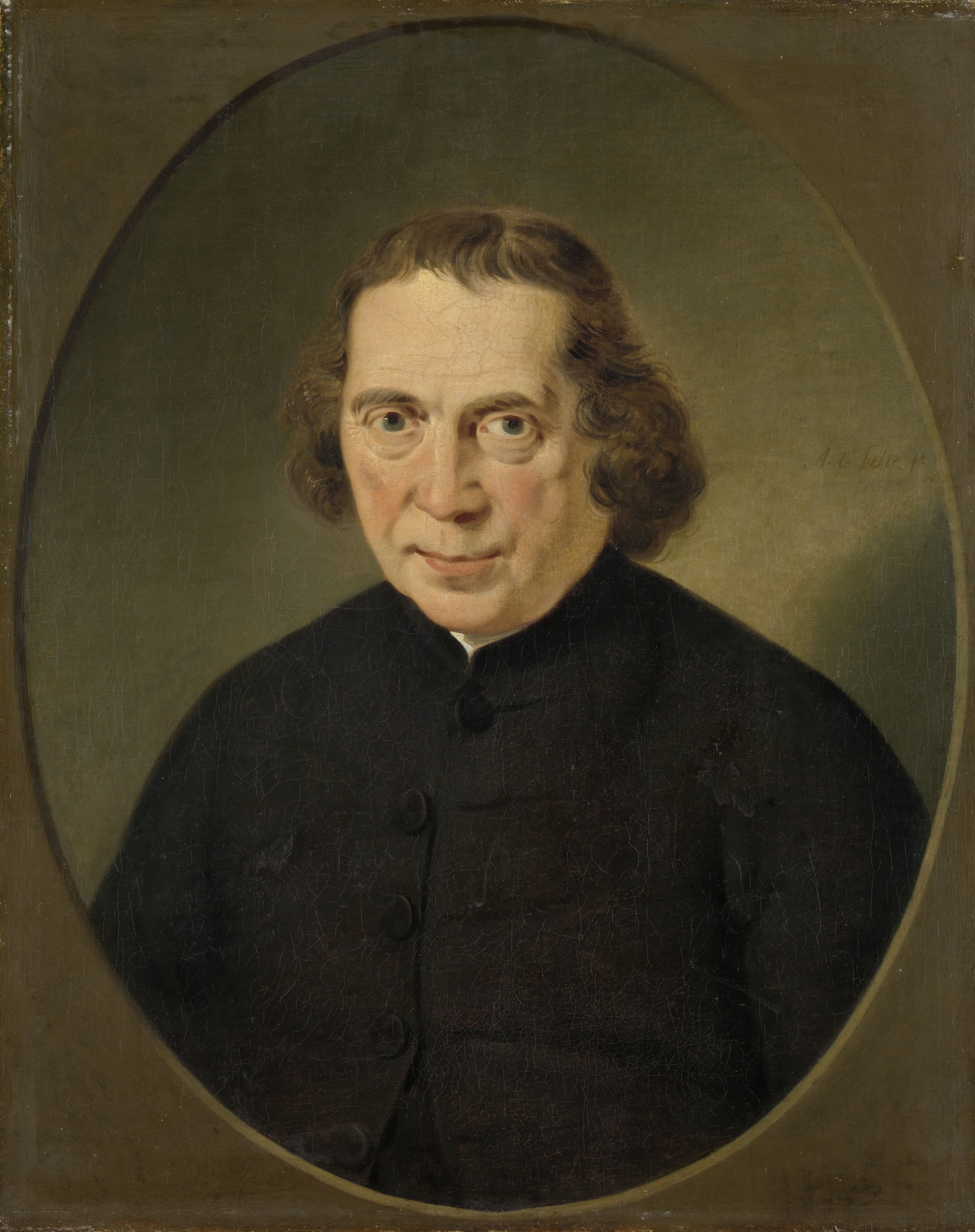
Jan Nieuwenhuyzen, in the Edams Museum in Edam

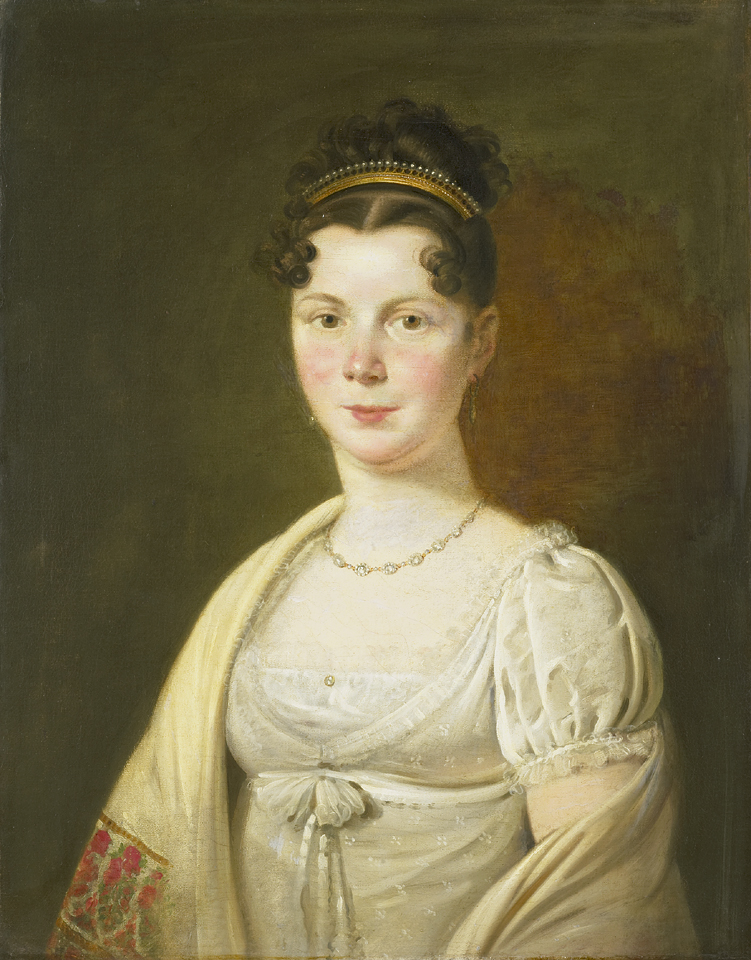
Wilhelmina Maria Haack, 1814–1820
