= Crown of the Netherlands =

Dutch royal regalia

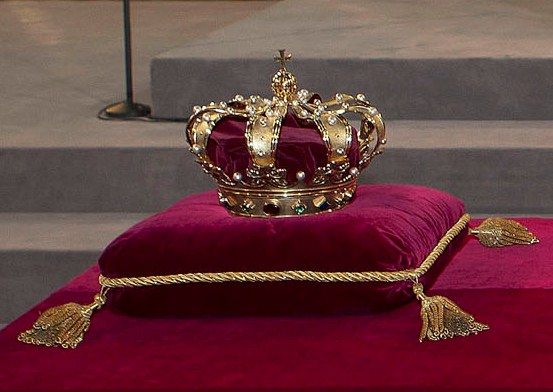
- The Dutch crown, on display in 2013

Heraldic depictions

Details
- Country: Netherlands
- Made: 1840
- Arches: 8
- Material: Silver-gilt
- Cap: Red silk
- Notable stones: Pearls

The Crown of the Netherlands is of relatively modern origin. In 1813 the new "Sovereign Prince" of the Netherlands, Prince William Frederick, son and heir of the exiled stadtholder Willem V of Orange, was sworn in as Dutch monarch in Amsterdam. There was no crown present at the ceremony.

When, in 1815, Willem was proclaimed "King of the Netherlands" in Brussels as William I, he was not crowned but there was a crown present during his inauguration, a huge and unusable construction of gilded copper, pearls made of pasted fishskin and coloured glass. The four holes in the ring, the peculiar size and the lack of a bill in the accounts that do contain the jeweler's bill for the gilded silver orb and sceptre, suggest that it was the old "funeral crown", used by the stadtholders in the 18th century and then tied to a cushion on top of the coffin when driven to the vault in Delft. This crown still exists. It may have been used for royal funerals in the 19th century.

The Dutch College of Arms (the "Hoge Raad van Adel") approved of a new royal coat of arms with crown on 24 August 1815. From then on, the heraldic crown and the actual crown would differ.

The heraldic crown was described as "a bejeweled golden ring with golden fleurons and pearls, eight rising arches studded with pearls and topped with an orb with a cross. The crown is not lined with velvet."

In 1840, King William I abdicated and a new crown was made. The renowned Amsterdam jewelry firm As Bonebakker & Son was commissioned to make the crown. The execution were left to master gold- and silversmith Theodorus Gerardus Bentvelt. This small crown contains no real diamonds or pearls. It was made of gilded silver, balls covered with fish skin and glass with coloured foil behind it. The lining was made of red silk. William II and his successors chose not to wear it, but to leave it on a special table during the ceremony when both the King and the States-General take the oath. It is thus one of the few crowns to have never been physically bestowed. The crown was used in royal funerals.

In 1898, 24 of the 74 pearls were removed as the crown was prepared for the inauguration of Queen Wilhelmina. The crown has not changed since then. It was the monarch's private property until 1963. It was given to a foundation controlled by the royal family and has never been on display, except for the investitures of 1898, 1948, 1980, and 2013, a funeral in 1934 and an exhibition in 1990.

== See also ==
- Dutch Royal Regalia
- Circlet
- Coronet
- Diadem
- Helmet
- Tiara
- Papal tiara
- Crown jewels
- List of Royal Crowns
