= Diederik Lodewijk Bennewitz =

Dutch silversmith and goldsmith (1764–1826)

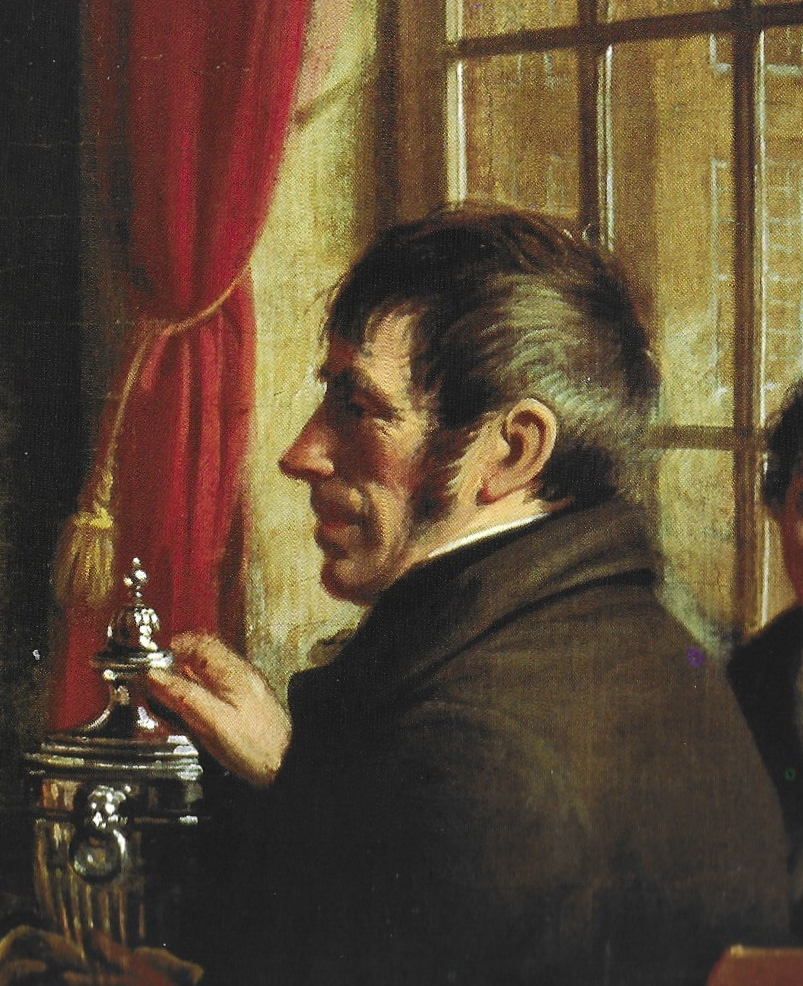
- Probably Bennewitz on a Bonebakker family portrait (1809). Detail of a painting by Adriaan de Lelie, Rijksmuseum Amsterdam.
- Born: 20 July 1764; Rinteln
- Died: 21 September 1826 (aged 62); Amsterdam

Diederik Lodewijk Bennewitz (20 July 1764 – 21 September 1826), also referred to as Dirk Lodewijk Bennewitz, was a Dutch goldsmith, silversmith and jeweller.

== Biography ==
Bennewitz was born in Rinteln in 1764 (near Hanover), born as the son of the Master Armourer (sword maker) Johann Ludewich Bennewitz (1734–1789) and Maria Margaretha Wingendorff (1727–1812). Bennewitz left Germany to move to Amsterdam, where he started working for Cornelis Leonard Diemont. He completed his Master's in silversmithing in 1785 after two years. He married Dorothea Korff (1765–1842) in Amsterdam during that same year. According to Van Benthem, Bennewitz had built up an excellent reputation as a silversmith. He had been asked to represent the Amsterdam Guild in The Hague on several occasions. He took over the company, together with Adrianus Bonebakker, in 1802, from the by then deceased brothers Jacob and Jan Hendrik Peirolet.

=== Bennewitz & Bonebakker ===
Bennewitz was tasked with managing the workshop within the Bennewitz and Bonebakker company. Bonebakker took responsibility for the business side of things. Prestigious assignments during this period included, for example, the ones commissioned by the City of Amsterdam to produce the so-called city keys. Bennewitz produced these keys to the City of Amsterdam in 1806, to be offered to King Lodewijk Napoleon as he entered the city. Circumstances dictated this didn't actually happen until 1808. The same set of keys was used in 1813 during King Willem I's entry. Bennewitz produced a second of keys to Amsterdam in 1811, which were handed to Napoleon Bonaparte during his visit to Amsterdam. The second set wasn't actually paid for by Amsterdam until four years later. The original keys now form part of the Amsterdam Museum's collection. The company was commissioned by the City of Amsterdam to produce Prince Willem (later King Willem II) and Anna Paulowna's wedding gift in 1816. This gift consisted of a 419-piece dinner service, an important part of which can still be admired in the Rijksmuseum in Amsterdam.

=== Bennewitz & Zonen ===
Once Bennewitz and Bonebakker had parted ways in 1821, Bennewitz continued his activities under the Bennewitz & Zonen name. Bonebakker continued his company under the As Bonebakker & Zoon name. His widow took over the reins of the company following Bennewitz's death in 1826, with her son George Bennewitz and her son-in-law Anthonie Knottenbelt both helping her to run the business. Bennewitz's other sons, Dirk Lodewijk jr., Jacobus and Pieter, who were also all silversmiths, had already died by then.

Much of Bennewitz's work forms part of the Rijksmuseum Amsterdam's museum collection.
