= Politics of the Netherlands =

Politics in the Netherlands Politiek in Nederland (Dutch)
- Coat of arms of the Netherlands
- Constitution: Constitution of the Netherlands

Legislative branch
- Name: States General
- Type: Bicameral
- Meeting place: Binnenhof
- Upper house
- Name: Senate
- Presiding officer: Mei Li Vos, President of the Senate
- Lower house
- Name: House of Representatives
- Presiding officer: Thom van Campen, Speaker of the House of Representatives

Executive branch
- Head of state
- Title: King or Queen
- Currently: King Willem-Alexander
- Appointer: Hereditary
- Head of government
- Title: Prime Minister
- Currently: Rob Jetten
- Appointer: Monarch
- Cabinet
- Name: Cabinet of the Netherlands; Council of Ministers
- Current cabinet: Jetten cabinet
- Leader: Prime Minister
- Deputy leader: Deputy Prime Minister
- Appointer: Monarch
- Headquarters: Binnenhof
- Ministries: 15

Judicial branch
- Name: Judiciary of the Netherlands
- Supreme Court
- Chief judge: Dineke de Groot
- Seat: The Hague

The Kingdom of the Netherlands is a sovereign state with a parliamentary representative democracy. A constitutional monarchy, the country is organised as a decentralised unitary state. The Netherlands can be described as a consociational state. Dutch politics and governance are characterised by a common striving for broad consensus on important issues, within both of the political community and society as a whole.

== Constitution ==
The Dutch Constitution lists the basic civil and social rights of the Dutch citizens and it describes the position and function of the institutions that have executive, legislative and judiciary power.

The constitution applies to the Netherlands, one of the four constituent countries of the Kingdom of the Netherlands. The Netherlands comprises all of the European territory, as well as the Caribbean islands of Bonaire, Sint Eustatius and Saba. The Kingdom as a whole (the Netherlands along with Aruba, Curaçao and Sint Maarten) has its own Statute, describing its federate political system.

The Netherlands does not have a constitutional court and judges do not have the authority to review laws on their constitutionality. International treaties and the Statute of the Kingdom, however, overrule Dutch law and the Constitution, and judges are allowed to review laws against these in a particular court case. Furthermore, all legislation that is not a law in the strict sense of the word (such as policy guidelines or laws proposed by provincial or municipal government) can be tested on its constitutionality.

Amendments to the Constitution must be approved by both Houses of the States General (Dutch: Staten-Generaal) twice. The first time around, this requires a majority vote. After parliament has been dissolved and a general election has been held, both Houses must approve the proposed amendments again with a two-thirds majority.

== Political institutions ==
The Netherlands is a sovereign state with a democratic government. It is a decentralised unitary state, meaning that power is centralised in the national government, with local governments having to act in accordance. Major political institutions are the monarchy (head of state), the cabinet (council of ministers), the States General (parliament) and the judicial system. Next to the two houses of parliament, there are four other High Councils of State, which are constitutionally independent from the government but have limited political role. The Council of State, which serves as the highest advisory body to the government is the most important. The others are the National Ombudsman, the Court of Audit and the Chancery of the orders of knighthood. Next to the central government the most influential level of government is the municipalities. Between the government and municipalities are positioned the provincial executives at a general regional level and the water boards responsible for water management. Although not mentioned in the Constitution, political parties and the social partners organised in the Social and Economic Council are important political institutions as well.

The Netherlands does not have a traditional separation of powers between the legislative, executive, and judicial branches. Having a parliamentary system, the government (the monarch and ministers) is formed based on parliamentary majority. According to the Constitution, the States General and the government share legislative power. All legislation has to pass through the Council of State (Dutch: Raad van State) for advice and the Social and Economic Council advises the government on most socio-economic legislation. Executive power is reserved for the government. The Social and Economic Council also has the special right to make and enforce legislation in specific sectors, mostly in agriculture. The judicial power is divided into two separate systems of courts. For civil and criminal law the independent Supreme Court is the highest court, while for administrative law the Council of State is the highest court, which is ex officio chaired by the monarch.

Dutch politics is characterised by seeking compromises.

=== Monarchy ===
The present monarchy was founded in 1813. After the expulsion of the French, the Prince of Orange was proclaimed Sovereign Prince of the Netherlands. The new monarchy was confirmed in 1815 at the Congress of Vienna as part of the re-arrangement of Europe after the fall of Napoleon. The House of Orange-Nassau was given the present-day Netherlands and Belgium to govern as the United Kingdom of the Netherlands. Between 1815 and 1890, the King of the Netherlands was also Grand Duke of Luxembourg.

The current monarch is Willem-Alexander, while the heir apparent is Catharina-Amalia, Princess of Orange.

Constitutionally, the monarch is head of state and has a role in the legislative process, as he has to co-sign every law to make it valid. The monarch is also ex officio chair of the Council of State, which advises the cabinet on every piece of legislation and is the final court for administrative law. Although King Willem-Alexander takes these functions seriously, he refrains from exerting his power in these positions. Until 2012, the monarch also played a central role in the formation of a cabinet after a general election or a cabinet crisis. The monarch used to appoint the informateur, who chairs the formation talks, after consulting the parliamentary leaders of all parties represented in the lower house of the States General. Because this advice was a matter of public record, the monarch could not easily take a direction that was contrary to the advice of a majority in parliament. On the other hand, what was actually talked about behind the closed doors of the palace was not known. Upon the conclusion of formation talks, the monarch appoints the cabinet. Upon the fall of a government, the Prime Minister has to request the monarch to dismiss the cabinet.

=== Cabinet ===
The government of the Netherlands (regering) constitutionally consists of the monarch and the ministers. The monarch only plays a role in the appointment of ministers, and is not involved in decision-making. The ministers collectively form the Council of Ministers. This executive council meets every Friday in the Trêveszaal at the Binnenhof, and initiates laws and policy. While most of the ministers head government ministries, since 1939 it has been permissible to appoint ministers without portfolio. The Prime Minister of the Netherlands presides over the cabinet and is the most important political figure of the Dutch government.

The Dutch cabinet is characterised by a high degree of collegiality and collective decision-making. The prime minister draws up the agenda and chairs Council of Minister meetings, but lacks the prerogative to appoint or remove ministers without the formal approval of the whole cabinet. Moreover, the prime minister's office is limited in size. Despite these limitations, the prime minister's position has grown in importance since the 1960s as a result of increased media attention, increasing demand for policy coordination and European integration.

The national government (Rijksoverheid or het Rijk) consists of ministries, the implementing organizations that fall under the responsibility of ministries, inspectorates, and High Councils of State, and is involved in the preparation and implementation of the plans of the government and parliament.

Some of the most highly regarded Prime Ministers of the Netherlands include:

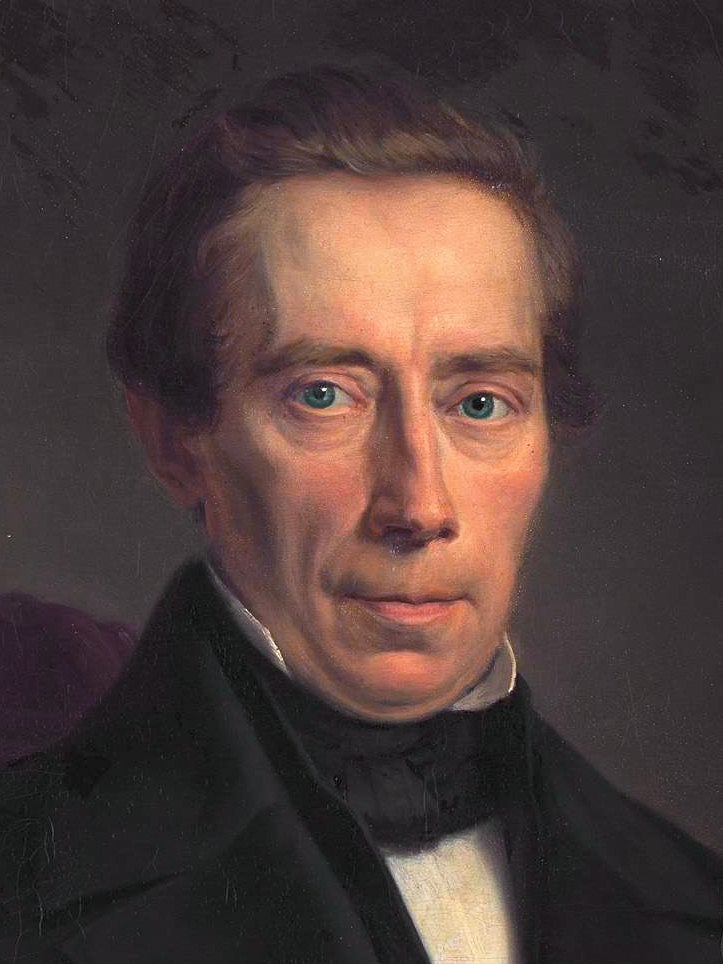
Johan Rudolph Thorbecke
(1849–1853;
1862–1866,
1871–1872)

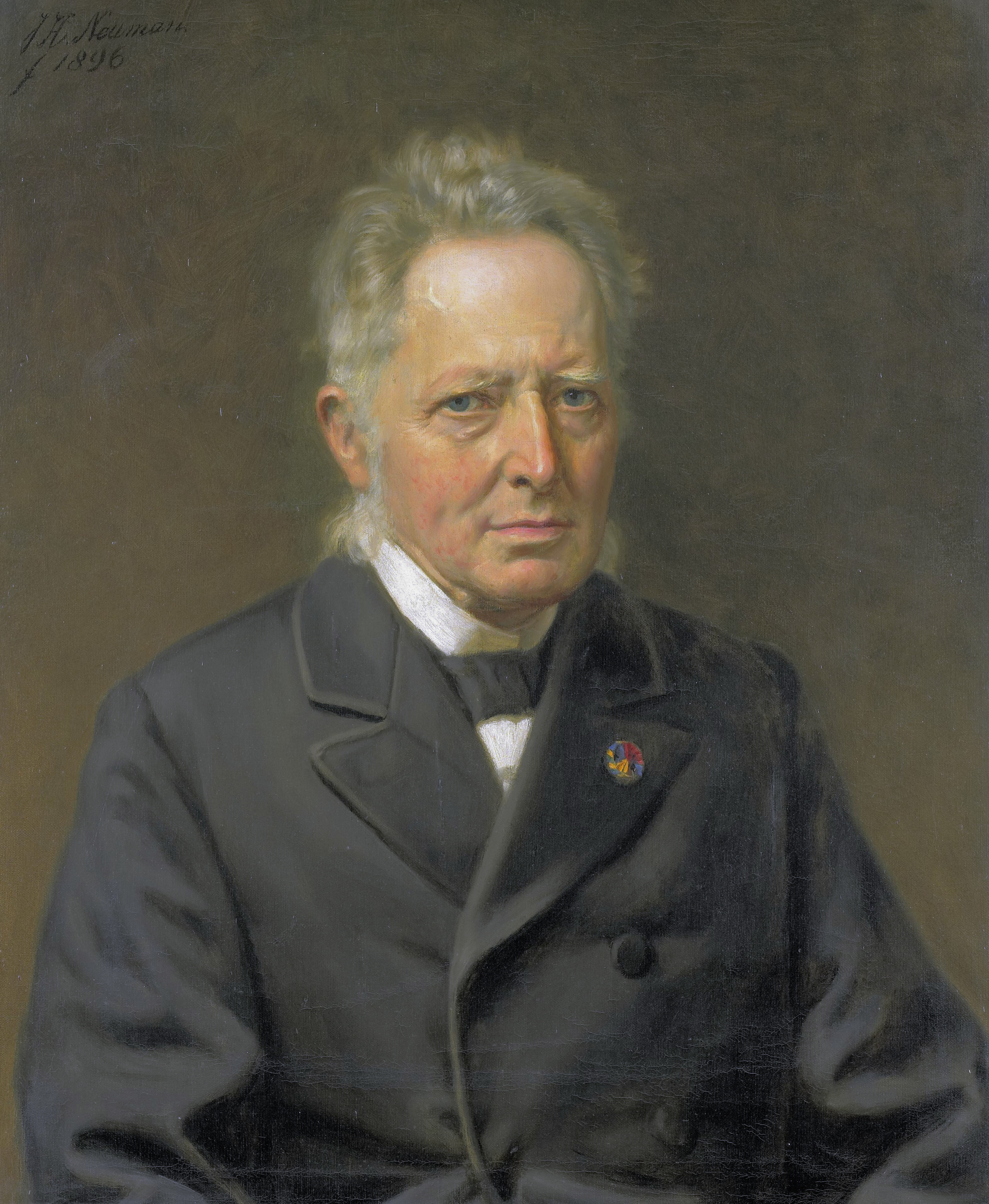
Jan Heemskerk
(1874–1877;
1883–1888)

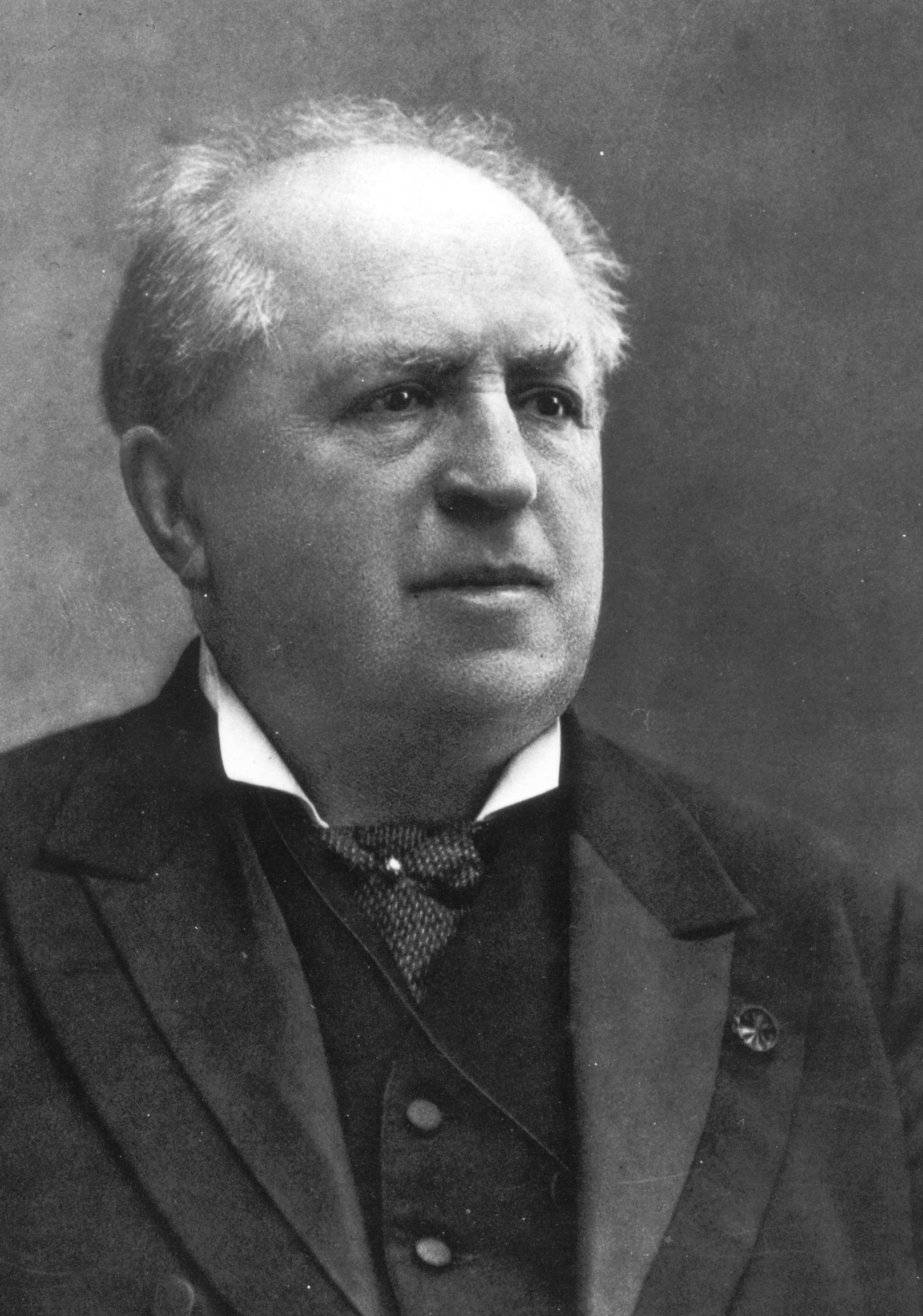
Abraham Kuyper
(1901–1905)

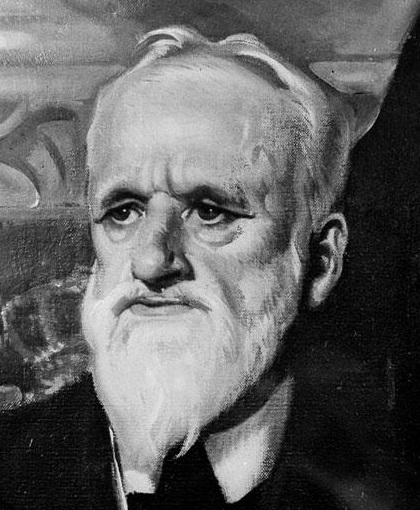
Pieter Cort van der Linden
(1913–1918)

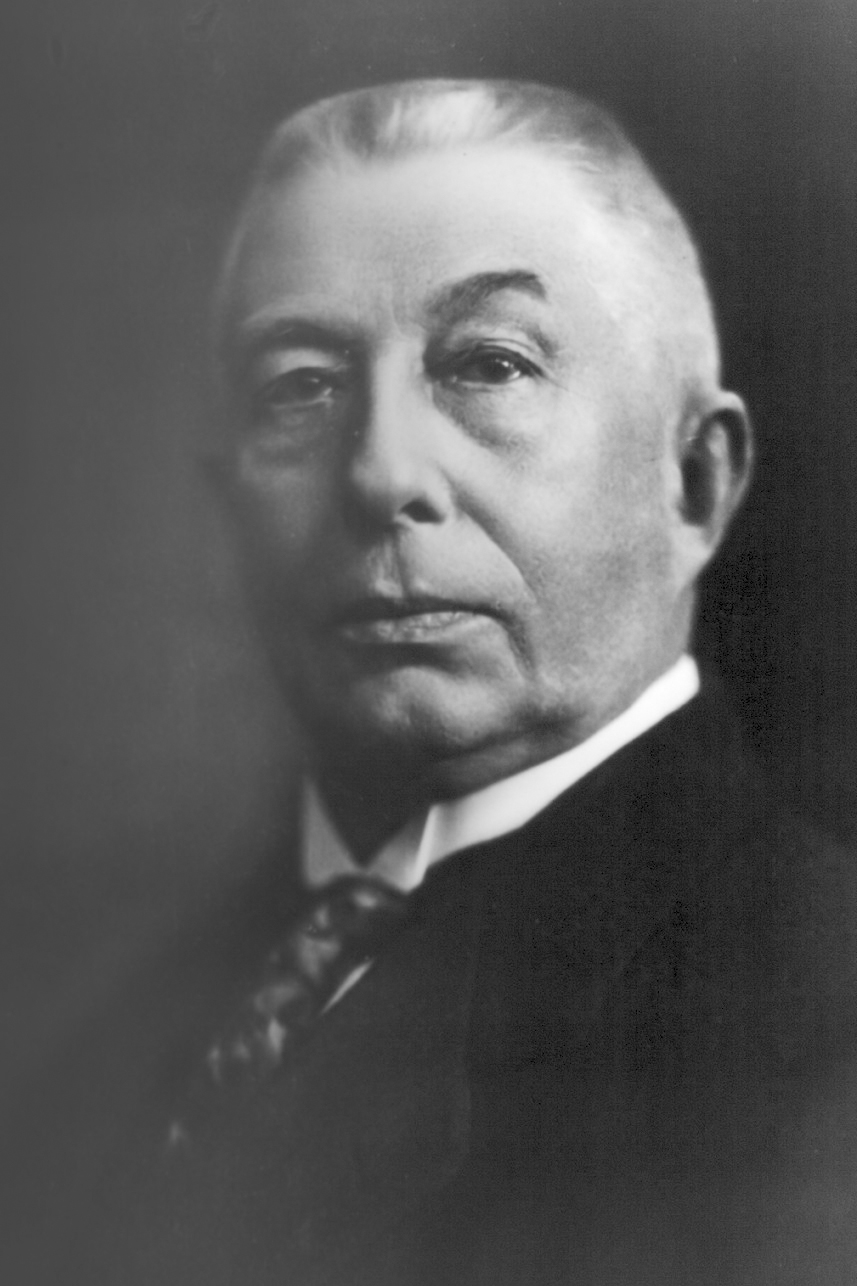
Hendrikus Colijn
(1925–1926;
1933–1939)

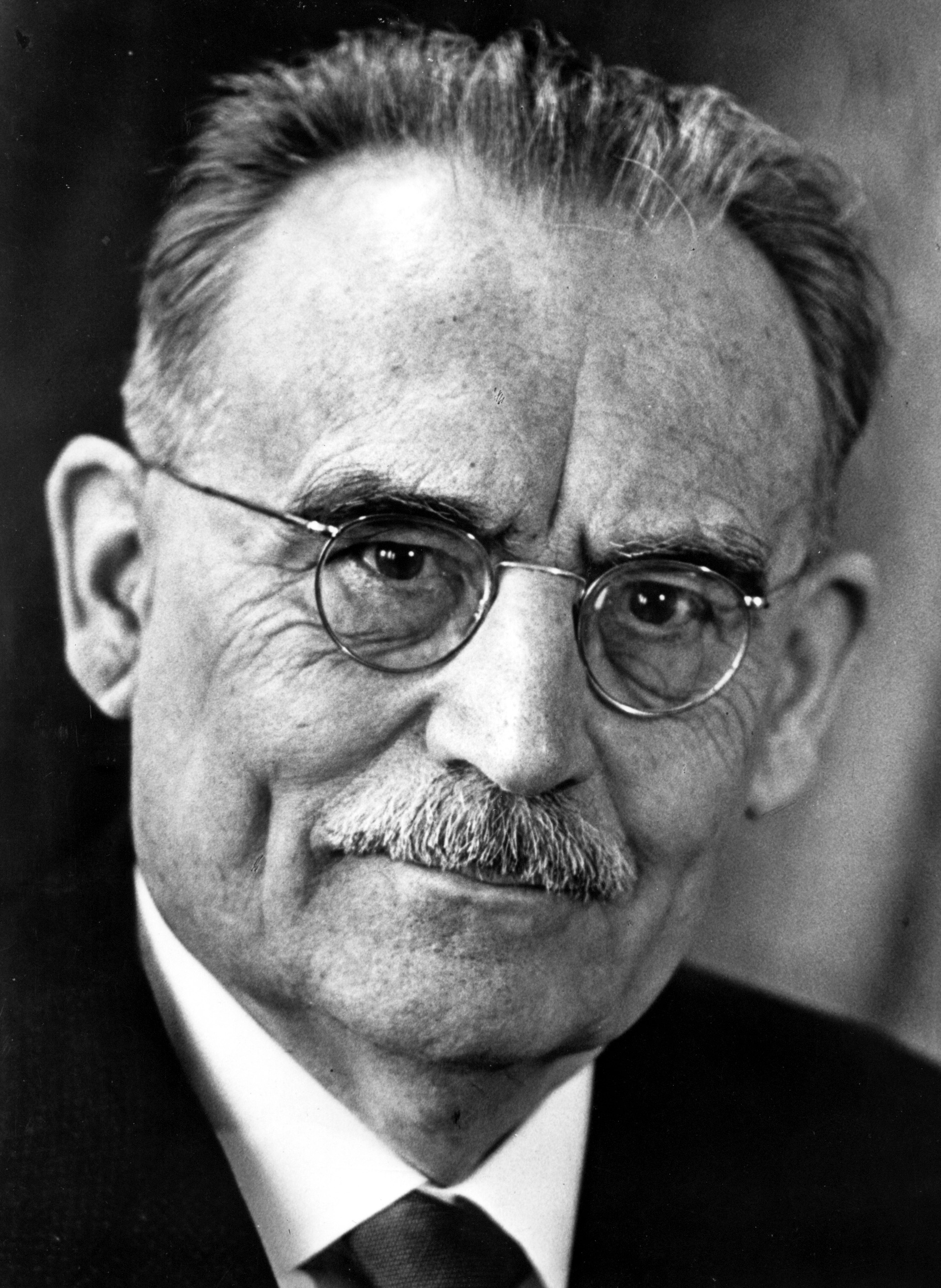
Willem Drees
(1948–1958)

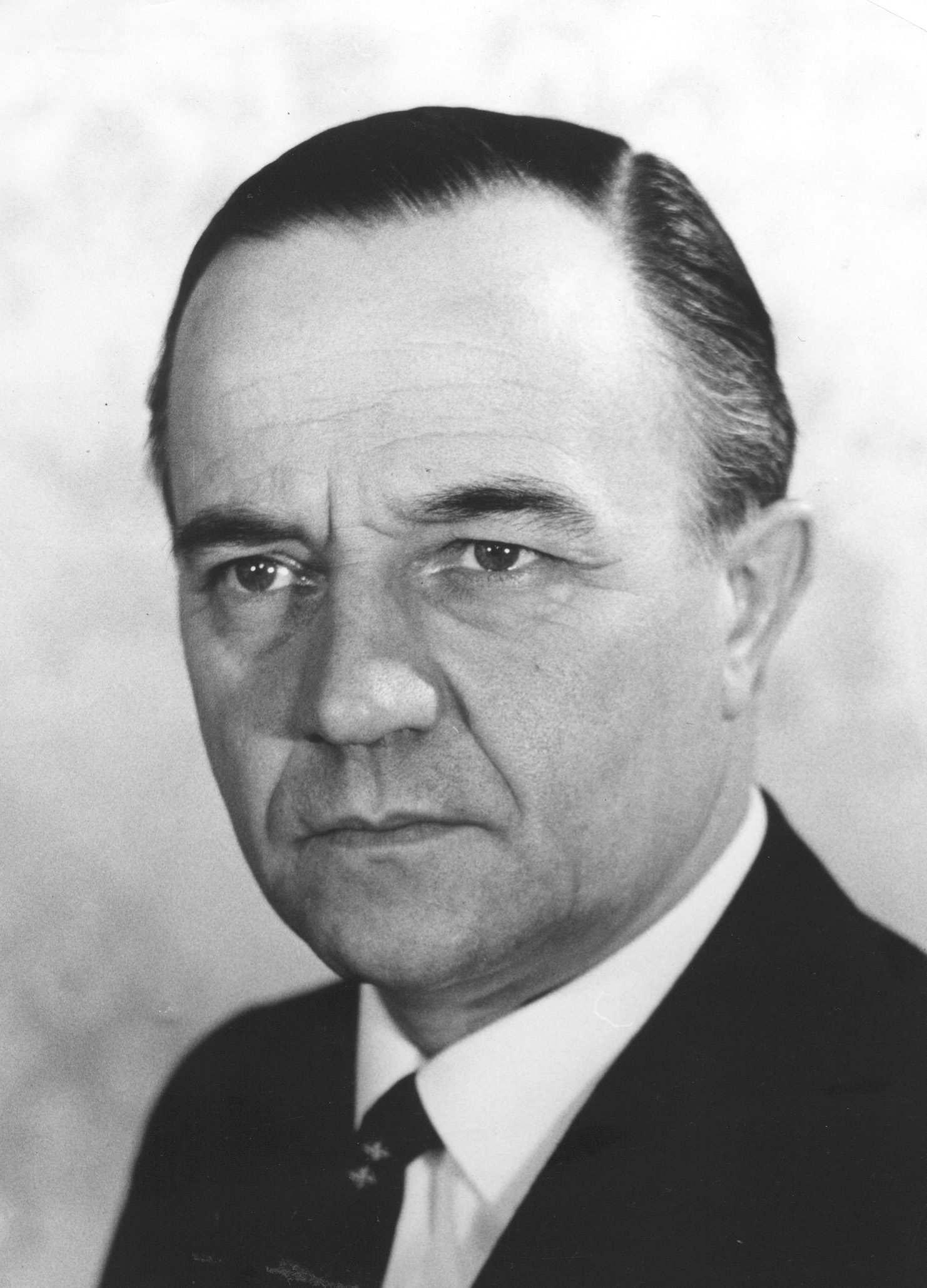
Piet de Jong
(1967–1971)

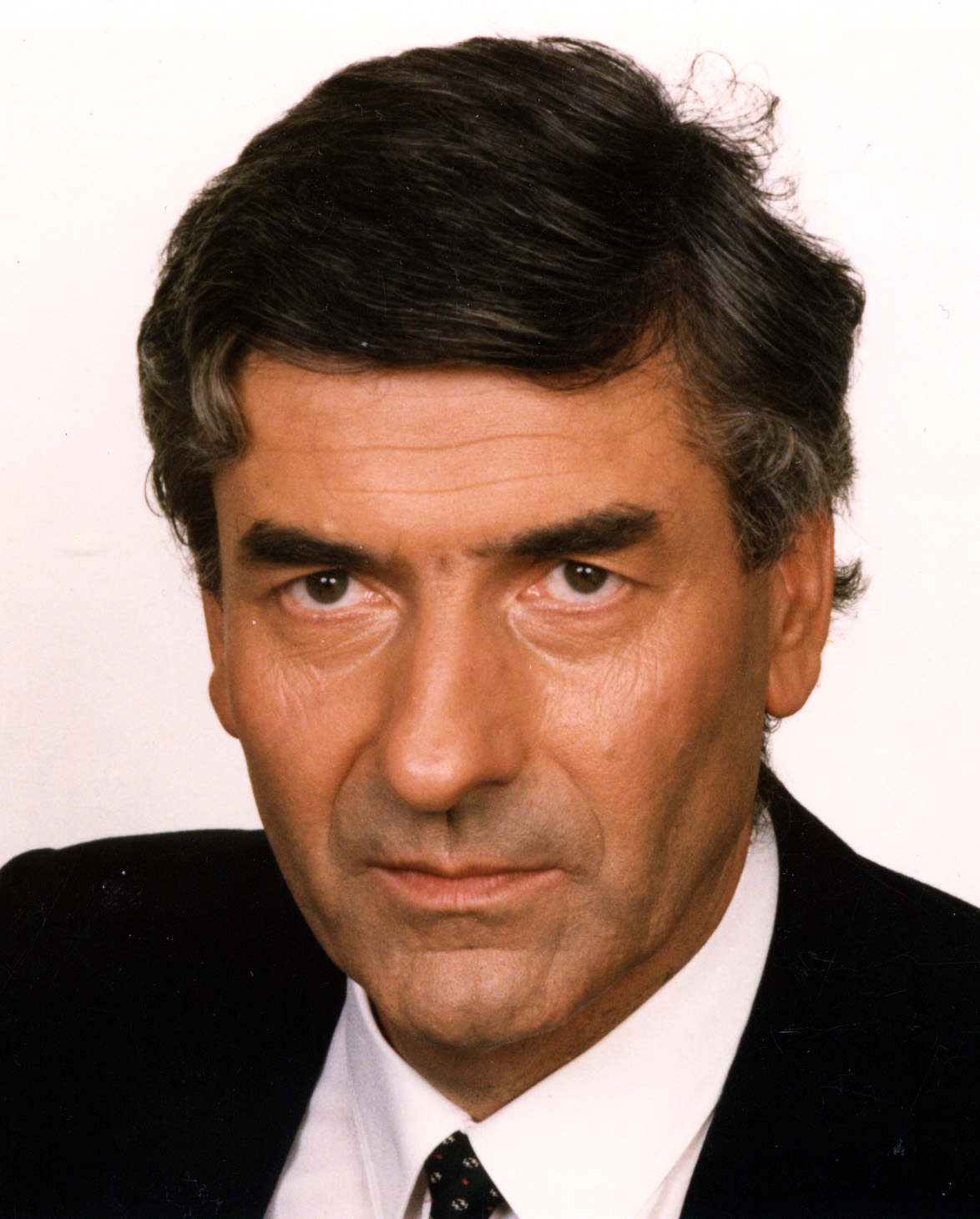
Ruud Lubbers
(1982–1994)

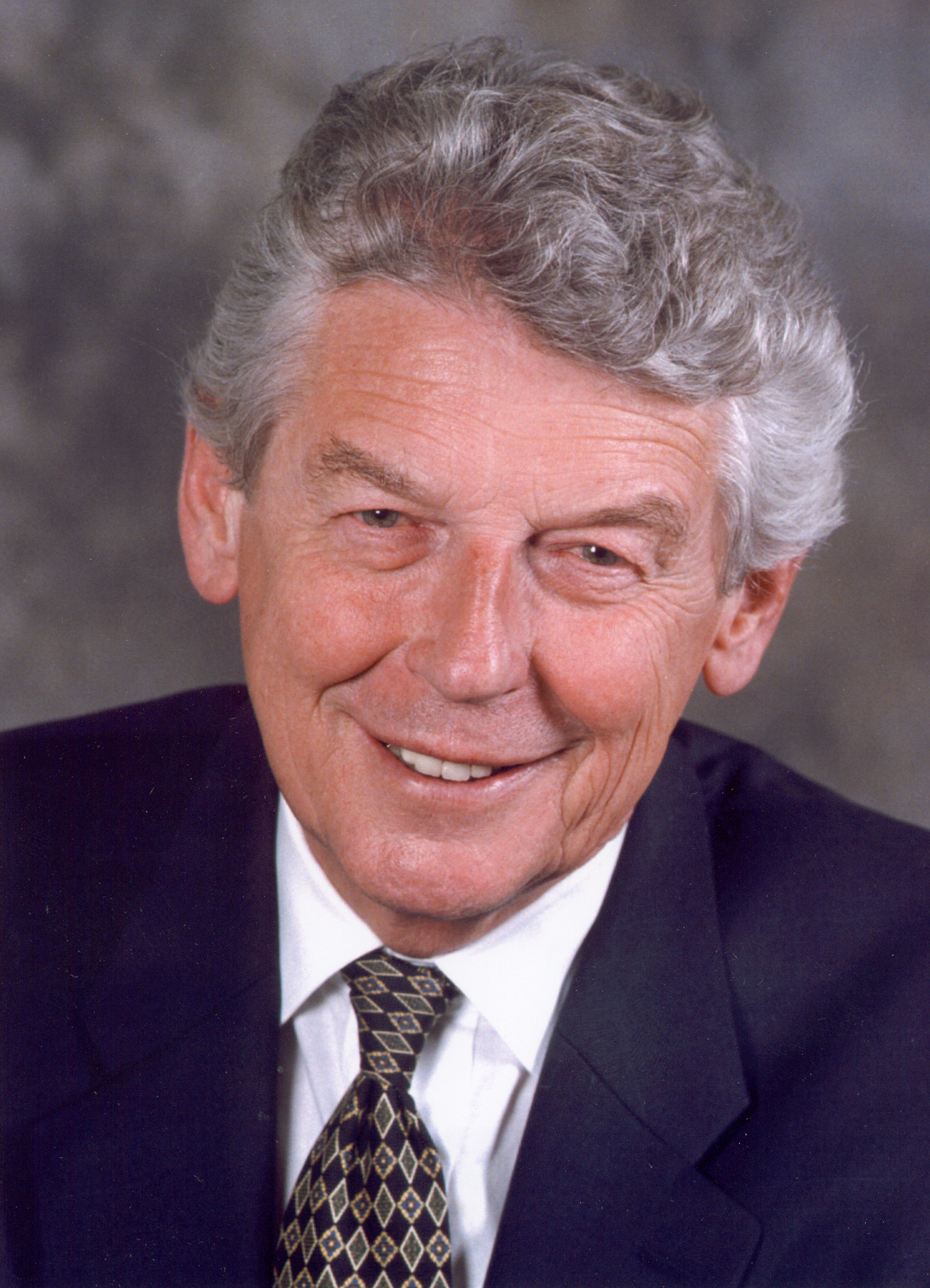
Wim Kok
(1994–2002)

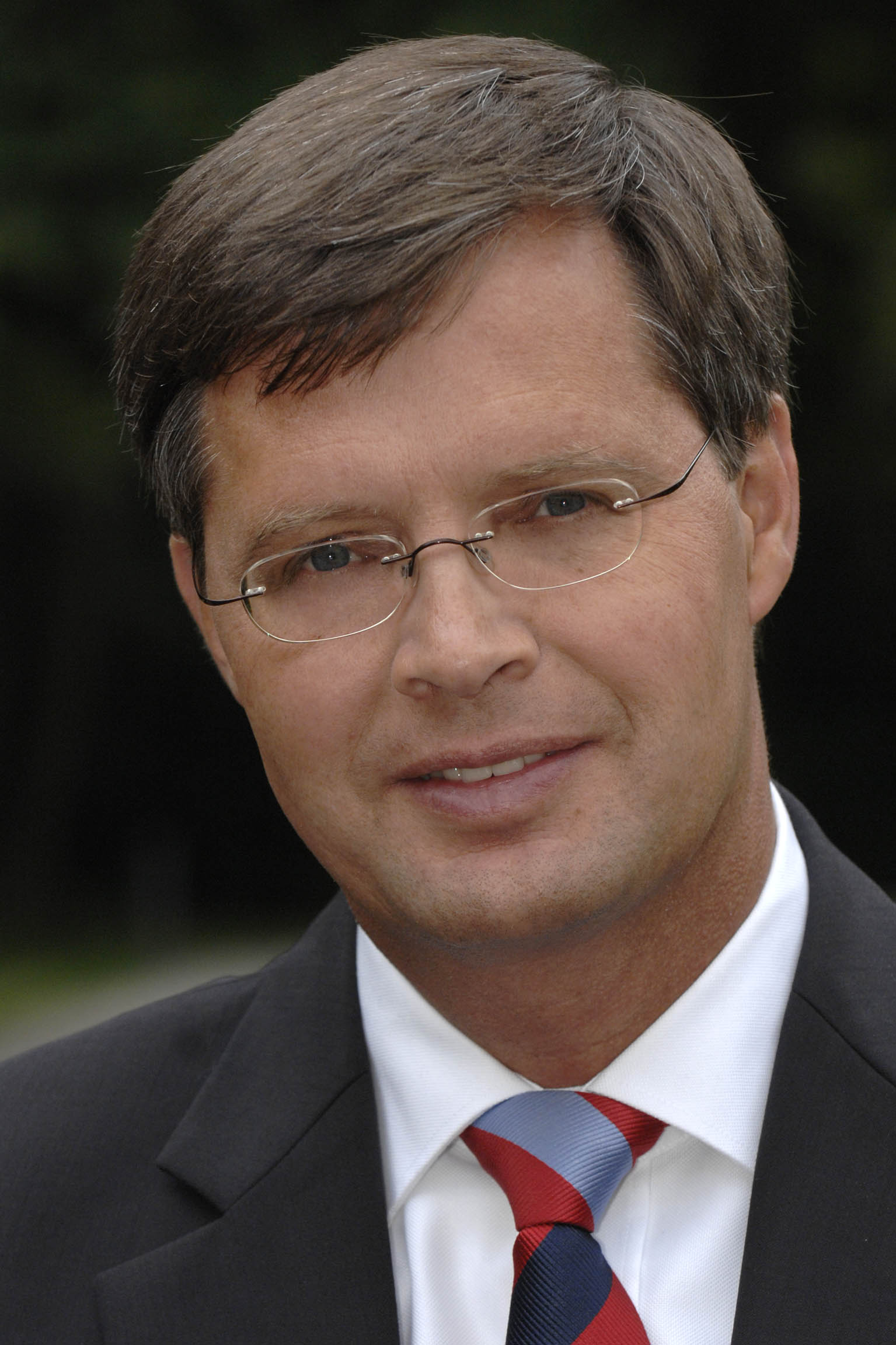
Jan Peter Balkenende
(2002–2010)

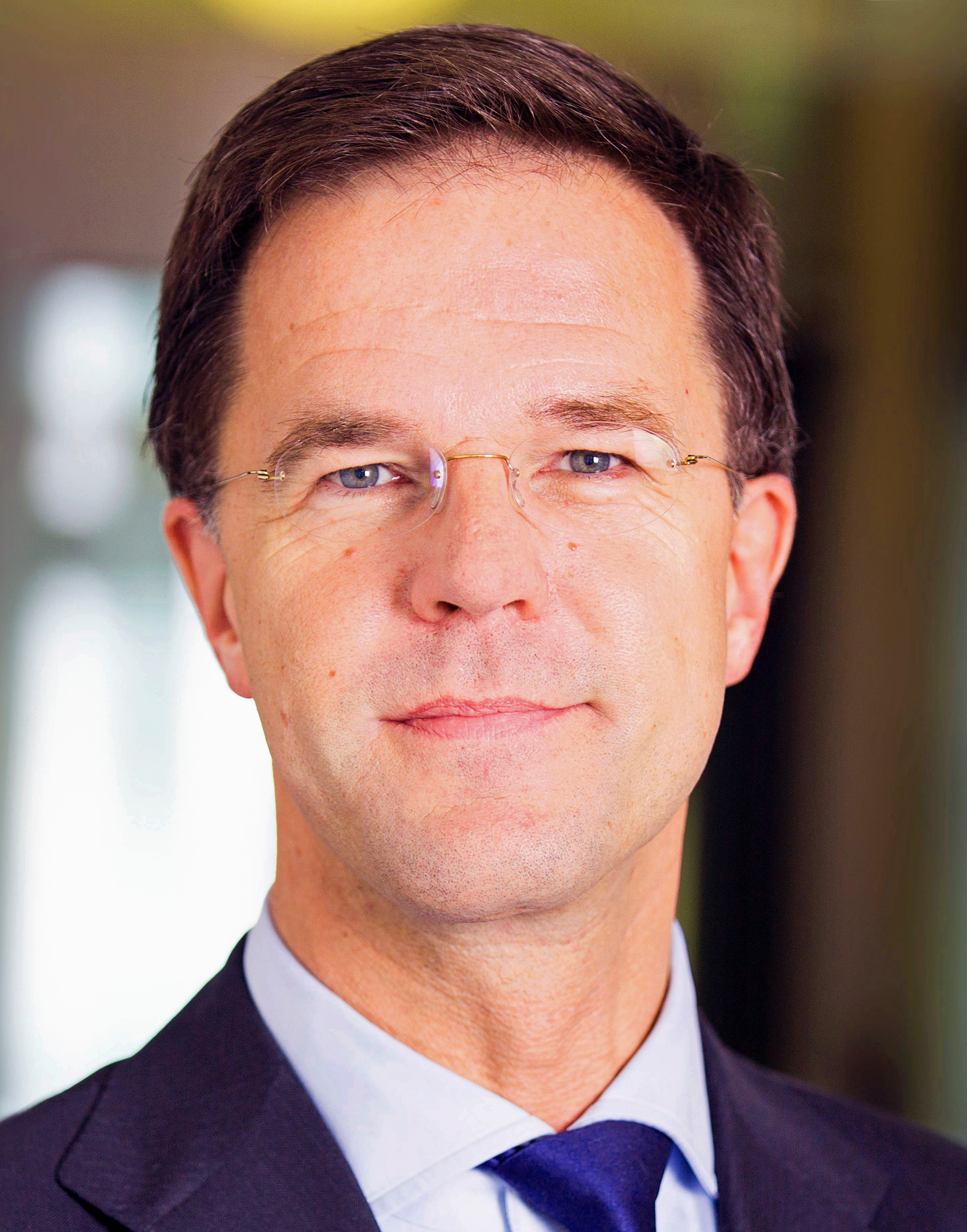
Mark Rutte
(2010–2024)

=== States General ===
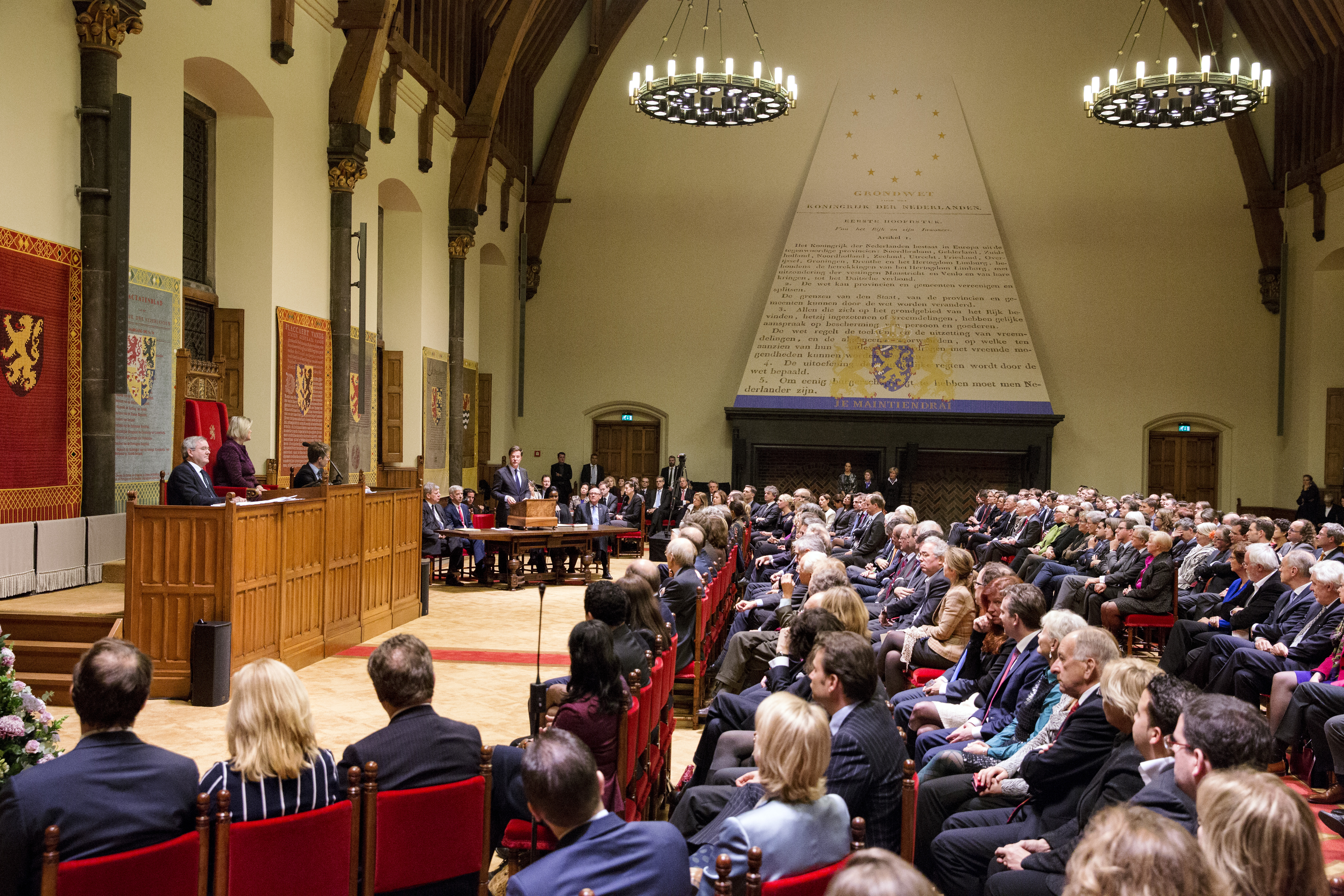
Joint session of the States General in the Ridderzaal, 2013

The Dutch Parliament, officially known as the States General of the Netherlands, consists of a House of Representatives (Tweede Kamer) and a Senate (Eerste Kamer). Both chambers are housed in the Binnenhof in The Hague and discuss proposed legislation and review the actions of the cabinet. Only the House of Representatives has the right to propose or amend legislation while the Senate discusses its value regarding the Dutch law since the Netherlands has no constitutional court. Currently there are 150 members of the House of Representatives and 75 Senators.

Members of the House are elected directly every four years using party-list proportional representation. Representatives are chosen on personal title, so when a member no longer agrees with his or her party, the member can decide to stay in the chamber, either as an independent representative, or as a member of another parliamentary party. If a member decides to resign, the empty seat falls to the original party collecting the votes, and is offered to the highest placed candidate on the party's electoral list who was not elected. Coalition governments may fall before their term expires, which usually results in early dissolution of the House and new elections.

Members of the Senate are elected indirectly by provincial councilors, again every four years, just after the elections of the provincial councils, via a system of proportional representation. Nowadays, the Senate is mainly considered to be a body of elder statesmen reconsidering legislation at ease, away from the pressure of daily political and media hypes. The position of senator is a part-time job as the institution meets once a week.

=== Political parties ===
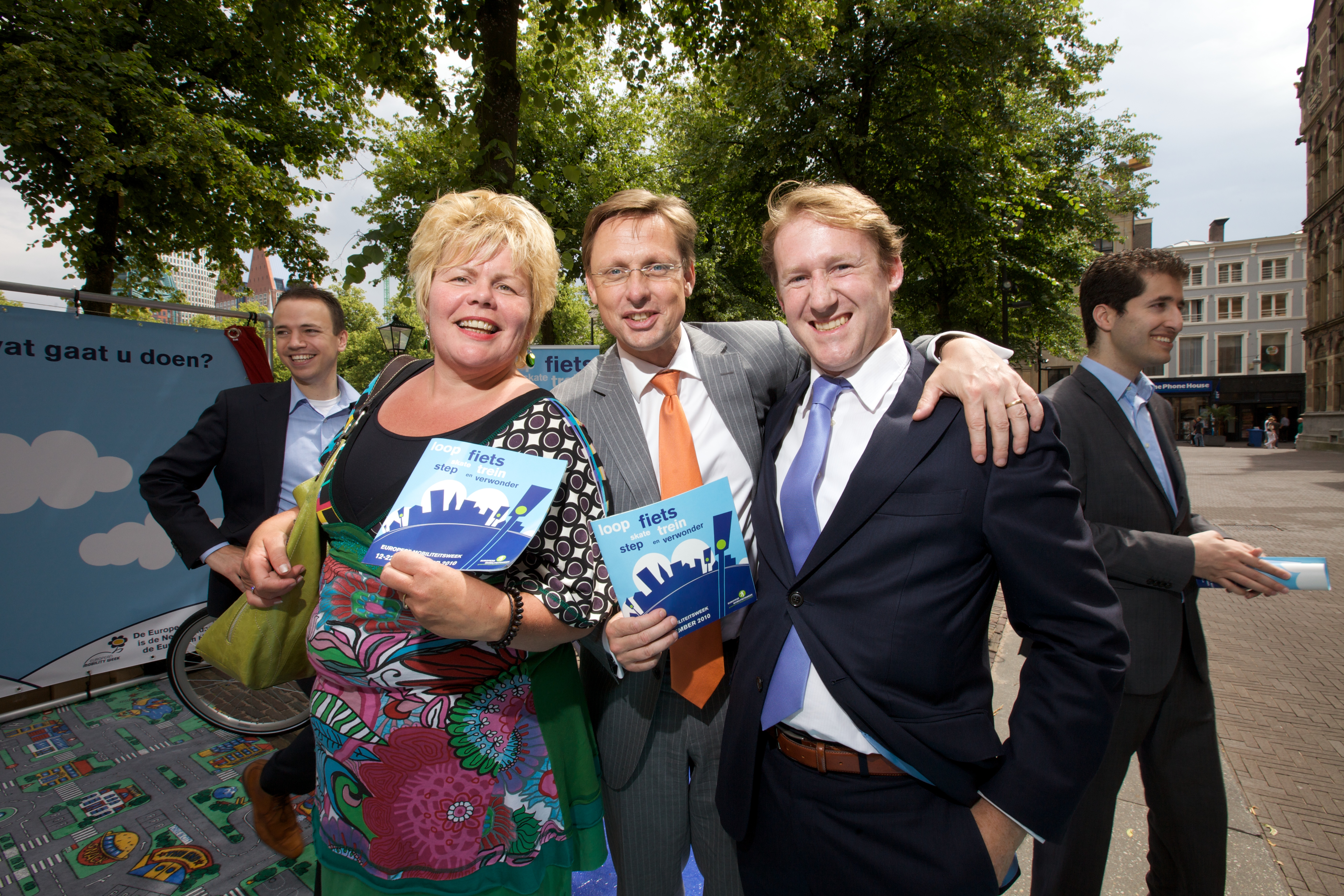
Several members of the House of Representatives campaigning for their respective parties in 2010. From left to right: Sander de Rouwe (CDA), Ineke van Gent (GL), Han ten Broeke (VVD), Kees Verhoeven (D66) and Farshad Bashir (SP)

The system of proportional representation, combined with the historical social division between Catholics, Protestants, socialists and liberals, has resulted in a multiparty system. The parties currently represented in the Dutch House of Representatives are:

- The Party for Freedom (PVV), a nationalist conservative, right populist, and anti-Islam party founded and dominated by Geert Wilders, formerly of the VVD. Its philosophy is based on maintaining the integrity of Dutch culture, and opposing immigration and European integration. Mostly economically liberal.
- GroenLinks–PvdA, a political alliance of GroenLinks and the Labour Party. The party combines centre-left social democratic politics and green environmentalist ideals. It focuses on issues such as climate change, employment, social security and healthcare with traditional left-wing elements.
- The People's Party for Freedom and Democracy (VVD), a conservative liberal party. It has more sympathy for private enterprise and economic freedom compared to other parties. The VVD has supported prioritising security over civil liberties. While VVD is more market liberal, split party D66 profiles more social liberal stance and leans more to left.
- New Social Contract (NSC), a Christian democratic party founded in 2023 after Pieter Omtzigt split from the CDA two years earlier. They focus on "fair" government, education, healthcare, housing, and livable conditions.
- Democrats 66 (D66), a centre to centre-left social liberal party. The party supports liberal policies on social issues such as abortion, drugs, euthanasia and stands for human rights and LGBT progress. D66 is also a strong supporter of European integration. The party supports secularism, EU integration, and is relatively supportive of civil liberties and privacy.
- Farmer–Citizen Movement (BBB) is a centre-right to right-wing party that has its roots in agrarianism and rural development.
- The Christian Democratic Appeal (CDA), a centre to centre-right Christian democratic and moderately conservative party. It holds to the principle that government activity should supplement but not supplant communal action by citizens. The CDA puts its philosophy between the "individualism" of the VVD and the "statism" of the PvdA.
- The Socialist Party (SP), in its first years was a radical-socialist and communist party, a maoist split from the Communist Party Netherlands. It is now a socialist party advocating democratic socialism, rejecting the privatisation of public services and advocating increased social welfare and socialised education and safety.
- DENK, a small political party mainly focusing on and promoting multiculturalism and social integration. The party also supports environmentalism and international justice.
- The Party for the Animals is an animal rights party, that is often considered a one issue-party, although it claims not to be. The focus of the party is on animal welfare, protecting the environment and conservation. The party also has left-wing positions regarding education, privacy, healthcare and the economy.
- Forum for Democracy (FvD), a right-wing, nationalist conservative party. In favour of lower taxes, promoting environmental sustainability (while questioning mankind's influence on climate change), military investment and expansion, electoral reform, offering a referendum on European Union membership, reinstating border controls and ending what it perceives as mass immigration.
- The Reformed Political Party (SGP), an explicitly religious, radically conservative and theocratic Protestant party. It is a testimonial party. Only in 2006 and after heavy political pressure were women allowed to be members of this party. Reliably earns 2 or 3 out of 150 seats in parliament.
- The Christian Union, a Christian democratic and conservative party made up by mostly orthodox Protestant Christians, with conservative stances on abortion, euthanasia and same-sex marriage. In other areas the party is considered centre-left, for instance on immigration, the welfare state and the environment.
- Volt Netherlands, the Dutch branch of the pan-European socially and economically liberal Volt Europa movement advocating pro-Europeanism and European federalism and large civil liberties.
- JA21, a conservative liberal party that emerged after internal conflicts in Forum for Democracy. The party is influenced by the ideas of right-wing politician Pim Fortuyn, who was assassinated in 2002, promoting stricter immigration policies, entrepreneurship and more individual freedoms.

=== Council of State ===
The Council of State is an advisory body of cabinet on constitutional and judicial aspects of legislation and policy. All proposed legislation is sent to the Council of State for advice. Although the advice is not binding, the cabinet is required to respond to the advice and it often plays a significant role in the ensuing debate in Parliament. In addition, the council is the highest administrative court.

The council is ex officio chaired by the monarch. The probable heir to the throne becomes a member of the Council when reaching legal adulthood. The monarch leaves daily affairs to the Vice-President of the Council of State, currently Sybrand Buma, and the other councillors, who are mainly legal specialists, former ministers, members of parliament and judges or professors of law.

=== High Councils of State ===
The Dutch political system has five so-called High Councils of State, which are explicitly regarded as independent by the Constitution. Apart from the two Houses of Parliament and the Council of State, these are the Court of Audit and the National Ombudsman.

The Court of Audit investigates whether public funds are collected and spent legitimately and effectively. The National Ombudsman investigates complaints about the functioning and practices of government. As with the advice of the Council of State, the reports from these organisations are not easily put aside and often play a role in public and political debate.

=== Judicial system ===
The judiciary comprises eleven district courts, four courts of appeal, three administrative courts of appeal (Central Appeals Tribunal, Trade and Industry Appeals Tribunal and Council of State) and the Supreme Court. All judicial appointments are made by the Government. Judges are appointed for life until they retire at the age of 70.

=== Advisory councils ===
As part of the Dutch tradition of depoliticised consensus-based decision making, the government often makes use of advisory councils composed of academic specialists or representatives of stakeholders.

The most prominent advisory council is the Social and Economic Council (Dutch: Sociaal Economische Raad, SER), which is composed of representatives of trade unions and employers' organisations, along with government-appointed specialists. It is consulted at an early stage in financial, economic and social policy-making. It advises government and its advice, like the advice of the High Councils of State, cannot easily be set aside. The SER heads a system of PBOs, self-regulating organisations that contribute to making laws for specific economic sectors.

The following organisations are represented in the Social and Economic Council, accounting for two thirds of its membership:

- the left-wing Federation of Dutch Trade Unions,
- the Christian National Trade Union Federation
- the trade union for managerial staff, the Trade Union Federation for Professionals,
- the employers' organisation VNO-NCW,
- the employers' organisation for small and medium-sized enterprises MKB-Nederland, and
- the employers' organisation for farmers LTO Nederland.

The remaining third of the members of the council are appointed by the government. These include professors of economics and related fields, as well as representatives of the Bureau for Economic Policy Analysis and De Nederlandsche Bank. In addition, representatives of environmental and consumers' organisations are represented in SER working groups.

Other prominent advisory bodies are

- the Bureau for Economic Policy Analysis, which forecasts economic development,
- Statistics Netherlands, which studies and reports on social and economic developments,
- The Netherlands Institute for Social Research, which studies long-term social and cultural trends,
- the National Institute for Public Health and the Environment, which advises the government on environmental and health issues, and
- the Scientific Council for Government Policy, which advises the government on long-term social, political and economic trends.

=== Subnational government ===
The Netherlands is divided into twelve provinces, which are responsible for spatial planning, health policy and recreation, within the bounds prescribed by the national government. Furthermore, they oversee the policy and finances of municipalities and water boards. Provincial councils are directly elected by inhabitants every four years. Executive authority is exercised by the King's (or Queens's) commissioner and the college of the provincial executive. The commissioner is appointed by the national government and is responsible to the Minister of the Interior and Kingdom Relations. Members of the provincial executive are appointed by, and responsible to the provincial council.

Local government in the Netherlands is formed by 342 municipalities (as of 2023). Municipalities are responsible for education, spatial planning and social security, within the bounds prescribed by the national and provincial government. Like provincial councils, municipal councils are directly elected every four years. Municipalities are governed by the municipal executive, consisting of the mayor and a number of aldermen. The mayor is appointed by the national government and responsible to the Minister of the Interior and Kingdom Relations. The aldermen are appointed by, and responsible to the municipal council. The major cities of Amsterdam and Rotterdam are subdivided into administrative areas (stadsdelen), which have their own (limited) responsibilities.

Local government on the Caribbean Netherlands is formed by three public bodies sometimes called "special municipalities" which are not part of a province. They are governed by a Lieutenant-general (Dutch: gezaghebber) and "eilandgedeputeerden" which are responsible to the island council, which is elected by direct suffrage. Their activities are similar to but wider than those of municipalities.

Furthermore, there are water boards which are responsible for the country's inland waterways, groundwater levels, polders, dikes and other waterworks. These boards are ruled by representatives of companies, farmers and nature conservation organisations and representatives who are elected by citizens in the area. They have the power to tax their residents.

== Elections ==
The Netherlands forms a single constituency during general elections. Parties participating in an election submit a ranked list of candidates, based on which members of parliament are chosen. The Netherlands has an open list system, meaning that the ordering of the party list can be altered by preference votes. The electoral quota, the number of votes necessary to win a single seat in the House of Representatives (about 0.7% of the vote), serves as the electoral threshold. Because of this, smaller parties can secure seats in parliament.

== Policy ==
=== Foreign policy ===
The foreign policy of the Netherlands is based on four basic commitments: to Transatlantic relations, European integration, international development and international law. While historically the Netherlands used to be a neutral state, it has joined many international organisations since World War II, most prominently the United Nations, NATO and the European Union. The Dutch economy is very open and heavily reliant on international trade. One of the more controversial international issues surrounding the Netherlands is its liberal policy towards soft drugs.

=== Policy issues ===
Dutch policies on recreational drugs, prostitution, same-sex marriage, abortion and euthanasia are among the most liberal in the world.

== Political history ==
=== 1800–1966 ===
The Netherlands has been a constitutional monarchy since 1813 and a parliamentary democracy since 1848. Previously, it was a republic from 1581 to 1806, and a kingdom between 1806 and 1810 (it was part of France between 1810 and 1813).

Before 1917, the Netherlands had a two-round system with census suffrage (per the Constitution of 1814), in which only property-owning adult males had the right to vote. Under influence of the rising socialist movement the requirements were gradually reduced until in 1917 the present party-list proportional representation voting system with universal manhood suffrage was instituted, expanded in 1919 to include women.

Until 1966, Dutch politics was characterised by pillarisation. Society was separated into several segments (pillars) which lived separately from each other and there was only contact at the top levels, in government. These pillars had their own organisations, most importantly the political parties. There were four pillars, which provided the five most important parties, the socialist Labour Party (PvdA), the conservative liberal People's Party for Freedom and Democracy (VVD), the Catholic People's Party (KVP) and the two conservative Protestant parties, the Christian Historical Union (CHU) and the Anti-Revolutionary Party (ARP). Since no party ever won an absolute majority, these political parties had to work together in coalition governments. These alternated between a centre-left "Roman/Red" coalition of PvdA, KVP, ARP and CHU and a centre-right coalition of VVD, KVP, ARP and CHU.

The seat distribution in the House of Representatives from 1946 to 2025. The left-wing parties are on the bottom, the Christian democratic parties in the center, with the right-wing parties closer to the top. Occasionally one-issue parties have arisen that are shown at the extreme top. Vertical lines indicate general elections.

=== 1966–1994 ===
In the 1960s, new parties appeared, which were mostly popular with young voters, who felt less bound to the pillars. The post-war babyboom meant that there had been a demographic shift to lower ages. On top of that, the voting age was lowered, first from 23 to 21 years in 1963 and then to 18 years in 1972. The most successful new party was the progressive liberal Democrats 66 (D66), which proposed democratisation to break down pillarisation.

Pillarisation declined, with the three Christian democratic parties losing almost half of their votes. In 1977 they merged into the Christian Democratic Appeal (CDA), which became a major force in Dutch politics, participating in governments uninterruptedly from 1977 until 1994. Meanwhile, the conservative liberal VVD and D66 made large electoral gains.

The Dutch welfare state had become the most extensive social security system in the world by the early eighties, but it came into crisis when spending rose due to dramatic high unemployment rates and poor economic growth. The early eighties saw unemployment rise to over 11% and the budget deficit rose to 10.7% of the national income. The centre-right and centre-left coalitions of CDA–VVD and CDA–PvdA reformed the Dutch welfare state to bring the budget deficit under control and to create jobs. Social benefits were reduced, taxes lowered and businesses deregulated. Gradually the economy recovered and the budget deficit and unemployment were reduced considerably.

When the far-left parties lost much electoral support in the 1986 elections, they decided to merge into the new GroenLinks in 1989, with considerable success.

=== Since 1994 ===
In the 1994 general election, the CDA lost nearly half its seats, while D66 doubled in size. For the first time in eighty years, a coalition was formed without the Christian democrats. The purple coalition was formed between PvdA, D66 and VVD. The colour purple symbolised the mixing of socialist red with liberal blue. During the purple years, which lasted until 2002, the government introduced legislation on abortion, euthanasia, and gay marriage. The purple coalition also marked a period of remarkable economic prosperity.

Since 2000, the Netherlands has largely supported the European Union and taken marked steps to integrate itself with it and improve its ties with NATO. Globalization, the introduction of the Euro, the enlargement of the European Union, the enlargement of NATO, the aftermath of the Orange Revolution and other factors have contributed to that.

The purple coalition lost its majority in the 2002 general election due to the rise of the Pim Fortuyn List (LPF), the new political party led by the flamboyant populist Pim Fortuyn. He campaigned on an anti-immigration programme and spoke of the "Purple Chaos" (Dutch: Puinhopen van Paars). Fortuyn was shot dead nine days before the elections. The LPF entered the House of Representatives with 26 seats, while the PvdA had its worst ever result, losing nearly half its seats. A cabinet was formed by CDA, VVD, and LPF, led by Prime Minister Jan Peter Balkenende. It proved short-lived: after only 87 days in power, the coalition fell apart as a result of consecutive conflicts within the LPF and between LPF ministers.

In the ensuing January 2003 general election, the LPF dropped to only five percent of the seats in the House of Representatives. The left-wing Socialist Party (SP) led by Jan Marijnissen became the fourth strongest party. The centre-right second Balkenende cabinet was formed by the CDA, VVD, and D66. Against popular sentiment, the right-wing coalition initiated a programme of welfare state reforms, healthcare privatisation, and stricter immigration policies. On 1 June 2005, the Dutch electorate voted in a referendum against the proposed European Constitution by a majority of 61.54%, three days after 57.67% of the French voters had rejected the treaty.

In June 2006, D66 withdrew its support for the coalition in the aftermath of the upheaval about the asylum procedure of Ayaan Hirsi Ali instigated by immigration minister Rita Verdonk. As a result, the caretaker third Balkenende cabinet was formed by CDA and VVD. The ensuing 2006 general election saw a major advance of the SP, which almost tripled in size and became the third largest party with 25 seats, while the moderate PvdA lost a quarter of its seats. LPF lost all its seats, while the new anti-immigrant Party for Freedom (PVV) won 9 seats, becoming the fifth largest party. This polarisation made the formation negotiations very difficult. The talks resulted in the formation of the social-Christian fourth Balkenende cabinet supported by CDA, PvdA, and the Christian Union (CU). This cabinet was oriented at solidarity, durability, and "norms and values".

In February 2010, the PvdA withdrew its support for the fourth Balkenende cabinet. The PvdA disagreed with prolonging the Dutch military involvement in Afghanistan. In the following 2010 general election, the VVD became the biggest party with 31 seats, followed closely by the PvdA with 30 seats. The right-wing PVV went from 9 to 24 seats, while the CDA lost half of their support and was left with 21 seats. The SP lost 10 of its 25 seats, and both D66 and GroenLinks got 10 seats. The CU, the smallest coalition party, lost 1 of its 6 seats. Both the SGP and the PvdD kept their 2 seats. The following cabinet formation eventually resulted in the first Rutte cabinet, a minority government formed by VVD and CDA, supported in parliament by the PVV.

In April 2012, the PVV withdrew its support for the Rutte cabinet after failed negotiations about the government budget for 2013. A political crisis followed, in which the parliamentary fractions of the VVD, CDA, D66, GroenLinks and the Christian Union, together disposing of a parliamentary majority, came to a temporary agreement for the 2013 budget. What followed in September 2012 was the 2012 general election, in which both the VVD and the PvdA won considerably, gaining 41 and 38 seats respectively.

The three parties that lost most were the PVV, sinking from 24 to 15 seats, the CDA, continuing their 2010 loss and winning only 13 seats, and GroenLinks, sinking from 10 to only 4 seats. The SP (15 seats), Christian Union (5 seats) and PvdD (2 seats) were stable, whereas D66 (10 to 12 seats) and SGP (2 to 3 seats) won mildly. Newcomer was 50PLUS, a pensioners' party, gaining 2 seats. In November 2012, after a relatively short cabinet formation, the second Rutte cabinet was formed by VVD and PvdA.

The second Rutte cabinet was followed by the third Rutte cabinet in October 2017, after the 2017 general election. It consisted of the VVD, CDA, D66 and CU.

In 2019, protests commenced with thousands of Dutch farmers who consider that "green policies" are a threat to their livelihood due to nitrogen consumption being limited and other policies which impose additional burdens on the ability to farm.

On 15 January 2021, the Rutte cabinet resigned in the face of the Dutch childcare benefits scandal. In March 2021, centre-right VVD of Prime Minister Mark Rutte was the winner of the elections, securing 35 out of 150 seats. The second biggest party was the centre to centre-left D66 with 24 seats. Geert Wilders' radical-right party lost a few seats, while Thierry Baudet's radical-right party Forum for Democracy grew. The ensuing fourth Rutte cabinet failed to reach a compromise on asylum policy and fell in July 2023, triggering November snap election. The right-wing populist Party for Freedom (PVV), led by Geert Wilders, won the largest number of seats, and it formed the right-wing Schoof cabinet.

The Netherlands were in 2023 considered the 17th most electoral democratic country in the world according to the V-Dem Democracy indices.

== See also ==
- Hate speech laws in the Netherlands
