= Constitution of the Netherlands =

Basic law of the Netherlands

Constitution of the Kingdom of the Netherlands

Overview
- Original title: (in Dutch) Grondwet voor het Koninkrijk der Nederlanden van 24 augustus 1815
- Jurisdiction: Kingdom of the Netherlands (most contents applies only to the Netherlands proper)
- Ratified: 24 August 1815; 210 years ago
- Date effective: 24 August 1815; 210 years ago
- System: Constitutional monarchy

Government structure
- Branches: Three (executive, legislature and judiciary)
- Chambers: Two (Senate and the House of Representatives)
- Executive: Prime Minister-led Council of Ministers responsible to the House of Representatives
- Federalism: Unitary
- Electoral college: No
- Last amended: 22 February 2023; 2 years ago
- Supersedes: Grondwet van den Staat der Verëenigde Nederlanden (1814)

The Constitution of the Kingdom of the Netherlands of 24 August 1815 (Dutch: Grondwet voor het Koninkrijk der Nederlanden van 24 augustus 1815) is one of two fundamental documents governing the Kingdom of the Netherlands as well as the fundamental law of the Netherlands proper (the territory of the Kingdom mainly situated in Europe). The Kingdom of the Netherlands also includes Aruba, Curaçao and Sint Maarten: there is an overarching instrument of the entire kingdom that has constitution characteristics: the Charter for the Kingdom of the Netherlands. Sint Maarten is the only country in the Kingdom of the Netherlands that has a constitutional court to govern the Sint Maarten legislature.

The constitution of the Netherlands is only applicable to the Netherlands proper, i.e. the territory in Europe and its public bodies of Bonaire, Sint Eustatius and Saba, the latter three since 2010 special municipalities, in the Caribbean, except when the Charter does not cover a certain legal subject. It is generally seen as directly derived from the one issued in 1815, constituting a constitutional monarchy; it is the third oldest constitution still in use worldwide. A revision in 1848 instituted a system of parliamentary democracy. In 1983, the most recent major revision of the Constitution of the Netherlands was undertaken, almost fully rewriting the text and adding new civil rights.

The text is sober, devoid of legal or political doctrine and includes a bill of rights. It prohibits the judiciary from testing laws and treaties against the constitution, as this is considered a prerogative of the legislature. There is no constitutional court in the Netherlands.

== History ==
The first constitution of the Netherlands as a whole, in the sense of a fundamental law which applied to all its provinces and cities, is the 1579 constitution, which established the confederal Dutch Republic. The constitution was empowered by the Union of Utrecht, thus by treaty. Article XIII of the treaty granted each inhabitant of the Republic freedom of conscience.

After the French invasion of 1795, the Batavian Republic was proclaimed. On 31 January 1795 it issued a bill of rights, the Verklaring van de rechten van de mens en van de burger. The newly-established National Assembly was tasked with drafting a constitution, the first of the Netherlands in the modern formal sense. Its members disagreed about the extent of suffrage and about whether to organise the republic as a federal or unitary state. A compromised constitution was rejected in a referendum, and a coup d'état was carried out by those favouring a unitary state with a powerful central government, similar to that of the revolutionary French First Republic. The Constitution for the Batavian People was enacted after it received support from an overwhelming majority in another April 1798 referendum. Only those who swore allegiance to the coup were allowed to vote. The constitution outlined the organisation of the national government, and it enshrined equality between citizens and included civil rights such as freedom of speech, assembly, and religion. The Napoleonic Kingdom of Holland, a constitutional monarchy, was established by the Constitutie voor het Koningrijk Holland on 7 August 1806. In 1810 the kingdom was annexed by the French Empire.

=== Establishment of the Kingdom of the Netherlands ===
After the French troops were driven out by Russian Cossacks, the new Sovereign Principality of the United Netherlands was established by the constitution of 29 March 1814, the Grondwet van den Staat der Verëenigde Nederlanden. William VI of Orange was instated on 2 December 1813 as "Sovereign Prince" by acclamation, but and only accepted "under the safeguard of a free constitution, assuring your freedom against possible future abuses." He first appointed 600 men of good standing as electors (Assembly of Notables) and these approved the constitution, written by a commission headed by Gijsbert Karel van Hogendorp. On 24 August 1815 William — since 16 March King William I of the Netherlands — having proclaimed himself King of the larger United Netherlands six days earlier, issued the first version of the current constitution, the Grondwet voor het Koningrijk der Nederlanden or Loi fondamentale du Royaume des Pays-Bas, establishing the United Kingdom of the Netherlands, now expanding his realm with the territory of the present state of Belgium, which would again secede from it in 1830. It included a limited unentrenched bill of rights, with freedom of religion, the principle of habeas corpus, the right of petition and freedom of the press as its main points. In the Treaty of London of 1814 the Allies ordered that the original Dutch state would devise a new constitution. It was approved by the new States General (consisting of 55 members) of the Northern Netherlands, but rejected by the majority of appointed electors (796 against 527) of the Southern Netherlands. However, 126 appointed members indicated that they objected to the new constitution because they believed in stronger provisions for freedom of religion. Since freedom of religion was guaranteed under the Treaty of Vienna, their votes and abstaining votes were counted in support of the new constitution instead. This infamous "Hollandic Arithmetic" left William feeling justified in his proclamation of the new kingdom.

Regarding the government's political structure, the 1815 constitution did not diverge much from the situation during the Republic: the 110 members of House of Representatives (lower house) of the States General, the "Second Chamber" as it is still called, were still appointed by the States-Provincial (for three years; each year a third was replaced), who themselves were filled with nobility members or appointed by the city councils, just like under the ancien régime. However, the new constitution provided for some rural delegates, elected through electoral colleges and appointed to all States-Provincial (first only true for Friesland) and the city councils. The electoral colleges, in turn, were elected by a select group of male citizens of good standing and paying a certain amount of taxes. Thus, a modicum of democracy was indirectly introduced into the system. Generally, however, the administration was monarchical: the King had control over appointments to the Senate, also known as the "First Chamber" and mockingly referred to as the Ménagerie du Roi. In 1840, when a new revision was made necessary by the independence of Belgium, a first step to a more parliamentary system was taken by the introduction of penal ministerial responsibility.

=== Constitutional Reform of 1848 ===
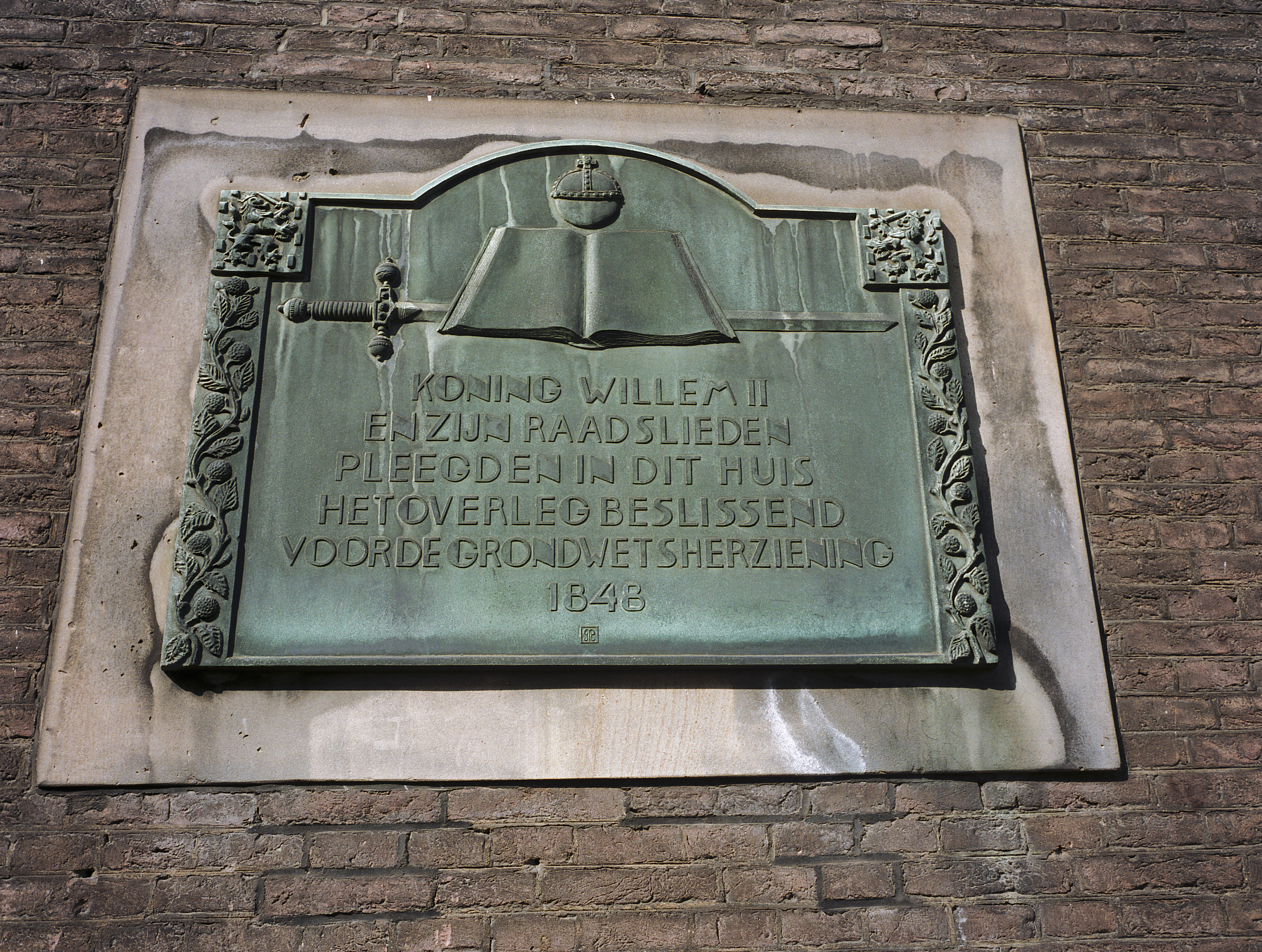
A plaque commemorating the actions of William II during 1848.

The constitution as it was revised on 11 October 1848 is often described as the original of the version still in force today. Under pressure from the Revolutions of 1848 in surrounding countries, King William II accepted the introduction of full ministerial responsibility in the constitution, leading to a system of parliamentary democracy, with the House of Representatives directly elected by the voters within a system of single-winner electoral districts. Parliament was accorded the right to amend government bills and to hold investigative hearings. The States-Provincial, themselves elected by voters, appointed by majorities for each province the members of the Senate from a select group of upper class citizens. A commission chaired by Johan Rudolph Thorbecke was appointed to draft the new proposed constitution, which was finished on 19 June. Suffrage was expanded (though still limited to census suffrage), as was the bill of rights with the freedom of assembly, the privacy of correspondence, freedom of ecclesiastical organisation and the freedom of education.

=== Expansion of suffrage ===
In 1884 there was a minor revision. In 1887 the census suffrage system was replaced by one based on minimal wealth and education, which allowed an ever-growing share of the male population to be given the right to vote; therefore this provision was at the time nicknamed the "caoutchouc-article". The election interval for the House of Representatives was changed from two (with half of it replaced) to four years (with full a replacement of now hundred members). Eligibility for the Senate was broadened. Any penal measure not based on formal law was prohibited.

In 1917, which was, as in 1848, influenced by the tense international situation, universal manhood suffrage was introduced combined with a system of proportional representation to elect the House of Representatives, the States-Provincial and the municipality councils. The Senate continued to be elected by the States-Provincial, but now also employing a system of proportional representation, no longer by majorities per province. The Christian democratic parties agreed to universal manhood suffrage in exchange for a complete constitutional equality in state funding between public and denominational schools, thus ending the school struggle. By the revision of 1922 universal suffrage was explicitly adopted in the constitution, after it had already been introduced by law in 1919. Each three years, half of the members of the Senate were to be elected by the States-Provincial for a period of six years, using a system of proportional representation.

=== Later revisions ===
In 1938 there was a minor revision, introducing some elements of the then fashionable corporatism by giving a constitutional base to public bodies regulating sectors of the economy. A proposal to make it possible to impeach "revolutionary" members of representative bodies, directed against communists and fascists, failed to get a two-thirds majority.

After World War II in 1946 a revision failed attempting to simplify the revisional procedure. However, a change was accepted allowing to send conscripts to the colonial war in the Dutch East Indies. In the revision of 1948 a complete new chapter was added to facilitate the incorporation of the new state of Indonesia within the Kingdom under the Netherlands-Indonesia Union. Soon it would become irrelevant as Indonesia severed all ties with the Netherlands in 1954. The revision also created the office of secretary of state, a kind of junior minister but one fully subordinate to a certain minister. In 1953 new articles were introduced concerning international relations, as the Netherlands was abandoning its old policy of strict neutrality. In the revision of 1956 the constitution was changed to accommodate the full independence of Indonesia. The number of members of the House of Representatives members was brought up to 150, of Senate members to 75. The revision of 1963 accommodated the loss of Dutch New Guinea to Indonesia. The voting age was lowered from 23 to 21. In 1972 there was a minor revision; the main change was a lowering of the voting age to 18.

In 1983 the constitution was almost entirely rewritten. Many articles were abolished. Social rights were included, most articles were reformulated (the main exception being article 23 about the still sensitive freedom of education) using a new uniform legal terminology and their sequence was changed. The bill of rights was expanded with a prohibition of discrimination, a prohibition of the death penalty, a general freedom of expression, the freedom of demonstration and a general right to privacy.

In 1987 there was a minor revision. In the revision of 1995 the introduction of a professional army, replacing the conscript army, was regulated. In the revision of 1999 a proposal to introduce an advisory referendum was rejected by the Senate. After a minor revision in 2002, the last changes were made in 2005; a proposal to introduce an elected mayor was rejected by the Senate.

== Revision ==
There are substantial safeguards to prevent carefree revision of the constitution. A revision of the constitution is submitted to both chambers of the States General, the House of Representatives and the Senate where the proposed revision has to pass with a (normal) majority. The proposed revision needs to be subsequently be supported by both chambers with a 2/3 majority, after general elections for the house of representatives (in practice most revision are submitted shortly before planned elections). The general elections and the new house of representatives guarantees citizens can indirectly vote for or against a revision.

== Content ==
=== Systematics and terminology ===
Civil law systems are characterized by their emphasis on abstract rules and methodology. Since the Second World War there has been a dominant movement within the Dutch legal community to be fully consistent in this and incorporate the total of case law accumulated over the years, while the old law books derived from the French Code Napoleon remained basically unchanged, into a completely new set of modern codes. There has been a general tendency to strive for economy of style, clarity of expression, conceptual coherence and unity of terminology. The complete revision of the Dutch constitution in 1983 is part of this process. Combined with an absence of explicit legal doctrine the result can be deceptive, as the simple phrasing hides the underlying implicit doctrine.

Because there is no Constitutional Court testing laws and acts against the constitution, much of the systematics are centered on the problem of delegation. If the legislative were allowed to delegate its powers to the government or to lower decentralized bodies, this would threaten democratic legitimacy and the constitutional protection of the citizen (as citizens have no recourse to a Constitutional Court). Therefore, delegation is only allowed if articles contain the terms "regulate" or "by force of law"; otherwise it is forbidden. This rule itself, however, being legal doctrine, is not explicitly included anywhere within the written law and is only found in the official commission reports and ministerial commentaries accompanying the bill.

=== Chapters ===
==== Chapter 1: Basic rights ====
Chapter 1 is mainly a bill of rights. There is no normative hierarchy indicated by the constitution: all basic rights are principally equal in value and importance. Some rights are absolute, most can be limited by parliamentary or "formal" law, many can be limited by delegation of limiting powers. They include:

- Equality before the law and prohibition of discrimination (Article 1). This article forbids any discrimination on any grounds but allows affirmative action. This right can only be limited by law, if there is an objective, reasonable justification for restricting it. In that case, the court will decide if the law is suitable, necessary and in proportion to reach the purpose of the law.
- Nationality, citizenship and right to reside in the country (including extradition) is specified in article 2.
- Right to be appointed to a public function and to hold multiple nationalities is specified in article 3.
- The right to vote (Article 4). The right can be limited by formal law; no delegation is allowed.
- The right of (written) petition (Article 5). This ancient right is absolute and cannot be limited by law. The right of petition has a long tradition in the Netherlands; indeed, the Dutch War of Independence started after a petition was rejected by the Habsburg authorities, which went so far as to treat the noble petitioners as "beggars" (Geuzen). The constitution of 1815 limited the ancient right to written petitions, hoping to curtail the typical disorder created by large groups of delegates. Nevertheless, such public mass petitioning has always remained very popular. The right of petition does not imply an accompanying right to be answered, but in practice all public bodies have special commissions to do just that. Often petitions are directed to the King, although the system of ministerial responsibility makes it impossible for him to take action by himself; his secretarial cabinet relegates such petitions to the relevant ministries.
- Freedom of religion (Article 6). This right can be limited by formal law; delegation is possible.
- Freedom of speech (Article 7). This article has only been partially changed in the 1983 revision, as it was linked to very complicated case law. Subarticle 1 contains the classic freedom of the press. Any censorship is absolutely forbidden. However, formal law can otherwise limit this freedom, e.g. by making a certain content punishable under penal law. Such limiting powers cannot be delegated to lower administrative bodies such as municipalities; the related right of distribution of printed materials can similarly only be limited by formal law. However, the Supreme Court has nevertheless ruled since 1950 that such bodies may in fact limit the distribution of materials, if such a limitation is not based on the content of those materials and does not imply a complete impediment to any separate means of distribution. They may for instance limit the spreading of pamphlets to certain hours for reasons of public order. Subarticle 2 has the same arrangement for television and radio broadcasts. Subarticle 3, added in 1983, gives a general right of expression, for those cases where neither printed nor broadcast information is involved; this includes the freedom of speech. Again, no censorship is ever allowed, but the right can otherwise be limited by formal law; explicitly mentioned in subarticle 3 is the possibility to limit the viewing of movies by minors under the age of sixteen. Although no delegation is possible, lower bodies may limit the exercise of the right for reasons of public order if such limitations are not based on the content of the expressed views. Subarticle 4 states that commercial advertising is not protected by article 7. The Dutch constitution does not contain a freedom of gathering of information.
- Freedom of association (Article 8). This right can be limited by formal law, but only to safeguard public order. No delegation is allowed. Almost any organization posing any conceivable danger to public order in the broadest sense is forbidden by the still extant Wet vereniging en vergadering ("Law of association and assembly") of 1855, but this law only very rarely leads to an official disbandment of an organization as a legal entity under the civil code. Dutch legal doctrine holds that the freedom of association does not protect against forced membership of organizations, e.g. when such membership is a condition for being active in a certain profession.
- Freedom of assembly and freedom of demonstration (Article 9). The revision of 1983 split the old combination of "freedom of assembly and association" and added the former to a new freedom of demonstration. The right can be limited by formal law. Delegation is allowed but only to protect public health, for traffic concerns and to prevent public disorder.

These first eight rights (excluding present Article 8) were the only ones present in the original 1815 document. The remainder were added starting in the 20th century.

- Right to privacy (Article 10). This right, introduced by the revision of 1983, is a general right to be protected whenever the personal integrity is threatened. The right can be limited by formal law. Delegation is allowed, but only in relation to databases. The article imposes a duty on the government to protect against a threat to privacy posed by a possible abuse of databases (subarticle 2); and to regulate the right of persons to be informed about the content of such databases concerning their person and the right to improve possible mistakes in such content (subarticle 3).
- Inviolence of the (human) body (Article 11). This right, introduced by the revision of 1983, can be limited by formal law; delegation is allowed. The right is a subspecies of the general right to personal integrity expressed in article 10, so no dichotomy is intended between the two concepts. It protects against violations like forced medical experiments, corporal punishment, torture and mutilation. It does not end with death and thus demands a legal basis for organ donation.
- Prohibition of unlawful entry of the home when no permission of the inhabitant has been obtained (Article 12). Although often presented as a general "right of the home", this article is in fact more based on the principle that the authorities do have a fundamental right to enter homes, but that this must be given a legal basis. The law has to indicate in which case and by which persons entry is legal. Delegation is allowed. Dutch courts tend to give precedence to the practicality of police investigation, so this article has had little protective value.
- Secrecy of communication (Article 13). Subarticle 1 contains the privacy of correspondence. This can only be violated on order of a judge and only in those cases indicated by formal law. No delegation is allowed. The judge in question is rarely a court but in practice the investigative judge (rechter-commissaris). The Dutch penal code offers a further protection of this right as several types of violating it are punishable as crimes. Subarticle 2 contains the privacy of communication by telephone and telegraph. This right can be limited by law; such law has to indicate which persons have the authority to allow a violation. No delegation is allowed. For most cases again the investigative judge has the competent authority. Since the nineties there is doctrinal consensus that the right extends to cell phone communication, but earlier this was contended.
- Prohibition of unlawful expropriation (Article 14). The Dutch constitution contains no general right to property. This has been defended by successive governments with the argument that such right is so fundamental to Dutch society that it is redundant to explicitly mention it. Expropriation is only allowed to serve the public interest and on the condition that prior formal assurance is given of (full) indemnity, meaning that some exact sum has to be determined. It has to be based on law; delegation is allowed, but only as regards the indemnity determination procedure, not the expropriation as such. Subarticle 2 states, however, that in an emergency situation the prior assurance has not to be given — in those cases the amount of compensation will be determined later. Subarticle 3 extends this arrangement to cases of destruction, partial damage, total loss and limitations of the right to property, caused by the competent authority to serve the public interest. Normal cases of damage are ruled by the civil code.
- Right to liberty (Article 15). This right can be limited by formal law. Delegation is allowed since the revision of 1983. Subarticle 2 safeguards access to the competent judge for anyone detained; this judge has the power to order the release of the detainee, like in the common law habeas corpus doctrine. In fact all relevant laws order the authorities to obtain approval from the judge within a certain time limit, but deny to the detainee access by his own initiative until that limit has been reached. Subarticle 3 contains the penal law obligation of the authorities to ensure that a trial takes place and is finished within a reasonable period of time. This right cannot be limited by law. In fact the Dutch penal code contains loopholes making it possible to delay trials indefinitely. Subarticle 4 states that all basic rights of a detainee can be limited in the interest of his detention.
- Nulla poena sine praevia lege (Article 16). This fundamental principle of legality (which requires that one cannot be punished for doing something that is not prohibited by law), already present in the penal code and introduced to the constitution in the revision of 1983, is absolute and cannot be limited by law. However, at the same time, the additional article IX was added to the constitution making an exception for war crimes and crimes against humanity.
- Ius de non evocando (Article 17). This ancient right states that no one can against his will be kept from the competent court. It cannot be limited by law — but law decides which court is competent.

In addition to these classic rights the revision of 1983 introduced a number of social rights. The distinction between the two categories is not strictly based on any legal doctrine and in fact the social right articles contain many freedom rights. The social rights are:

- Right to counsel (Article 18). Subarticle 1 contains a freedom right: anyone has the right to be legally assisted or represented in court or during administrative appeal. This right is absolute and cannot be limited by law. Nevertheless, the law may impose qualification requirements on legal representatives so that e.g. only attorneys are allowed to represent. Subarticle 2 contains the right to legal aid for the destitute. The right can be limited by formal law; delegation is allowed. However, doctrine holds that the State has an absolute duty to provide a minimum of legal aid.
- Labour rights (Article 19). Subarticle 1 imposes a duty on the government to ensure sufficient employment. This does not imply a right to be employed for the individual. Subarticle 2 demands that laws are made regarding the legal position of workers, including the protection of workers against accidents and workers' participation. Subarticle 3 contains a general freedom right to labour. This right can be limited by formal law; delegation is allowed. The right is limited to those of Dutch nationality, so in principle foreign nationals can be denied access to the labour market. The law in fact denies such access to illegal immigrants and asylum seekers.
- Welfare of the people (Article 20). Subarticle 1 imposes a duty upon the government to ensure the subsistence of the population and an adequate distribution of wealth. Subarticle 2 demands that laws are made concerning the entitlements to social welfare. Delegation is allowed. Subarticle 3 contains a right to welfare for the destitute. The right can be limited by formal law; delegation is allowed. The government has a duty to make a law implementing the right. The right is limited to those Dutch nationals living in the Netherlands.
- Environmental protection (Article 21) This article imposes a duty on government to ensure the habitability of the land — including the general infrastructure and especially the vital sea-defences — and the protection and improvement of the environment. Doctrinal consensus holds that "improvement" implies that government is not allowed to make environmental laws much less strict.
- Health, housing, culture and recreation (Article 22). This is a basket article combining rights that were too important to remain unmentioned, but too unimportant to warrant a separate article status. Subarticle 1 imposes a duty upon government to improve public health. Subarticle 2 does the same for living conditions and subarticle 3 for "cultural self-realisation" and recreational activities.
- Freedom of education (Article 23). The Dutch education system is characterized by ideological divisions. The constitutions of 1814 and 1815 expressed the principle of neutral state education; even in private schools giving a full curriculum religious education was forbidden. Parents wanting their children to be given some formal religious instruction had to send them to special bible classes in Sunday schools. In the revision of 1848 the freedom of education was first expressed. However, this was a negative right: parents were at liberty to let their children be educated in denominational schools, but had to pay for this themselves, whereas state schools offered free education. As the frame of government grew ever more democratic, this arrangement proved untenable in the gradually becoming more "pillarised" Dutch society. The school system became the central battleground of political change: the school struggle between elitist neutral liberals and conservatives on the one and mass-oriented confessional protestants and Catholics and eventually socialists on the other hand. In 1889 a system of school funding for denominational schools was introduced; in the revision of 1917 this was formalised by a guarantee of full constitutional equality between public and special schools: the Pacification. Even in 1983 this issue remained so sensitive that government and parliament failed to reach consensus over a changed redaction. As a result, Article 23 remained unchanged. It is therefore outside of the uniform terminology and systematics of the renewed constitution: some elements of Article 23 are absolute rights, others can be limited by law, for some this limitation can be delegated to lower administrative bodies — but it is impossible to understand from the article itself what is the situation for each element; this can only be learned from case law and doctrine. Absolute is the right to education itself (subarticle 2), the equality between public and special schools and the duty of the State to finance them all. The right to education is primarily a right to give education of any kind; the right to be educated is seen as derived; parents are free in the choice of schools. The right implies the right to found schools, the right to freely choose their underlying religion or philosophy of life and the right to organise them in accordance with such religion or philosophy. So not all "special" schools are denominational; some are e.g. anthroposophic or platonist. All have to be funded by government and with the strictest equality (subarticle 7); until recently law stated that this equality was nominal, meaning that if a municipality spent a certain sum per student in public schools, exactly the same sum had to be spent in its special schools. The right can be limited by formal law in that minimal quality requirements can be imposed (subarticle 5), both as regards the level of education and the standard of organization. Some of this power is in fact delegated to lower bodies; one of the breaking-points in 1983 was the refusal of parliament to express this in the constitution. The duty of State to (equally) fund is limited to free compulsory education (presently until the age of sixteen); Subarticle 7, however, states that law will specify the conditions under which non-compulsory education will be funded; unsurprisingly there is in fact in this field also strict equality. Subarticle 1 expresses the social right that education in general is an ongoing concern for the government; Subarticle 4 states that municipalities have the duty to provide for sufficient primary schools.

==== Chapter 2: Government ====
Dutch constitutional doctrine holds that the King and ministers together form the government and this indivisibly, so that the King in any of his public acts always acting under ministerial responsibility is not the Head of Government, but embodies it fully. The King is, however, head of state, and so a special paragraph is dedicated to the King in this quality.

===== §1: King =====
Article 24 stipulates that there is kingship and that this kingship is held by William I of the Netherlands and his lawful successors. Articles 25 and 26 regulate the line of succession to the Dutch throne; since 1983 female successors have equal rights to the throne. Further articles regulate abdication (Article 27); parliamentary approval of royal marriage on penalty of loss of the right to the throne (Art. 28); the exclusion of unfit possible heirs (Art. 29); appointment of a successor if heirs are absent (Art. 30 and 31); the oath and inauguration in the capital of the Netherlands, Amsterdam (Art. 32); the age of royal majority at eighteen (Art. 33); guardianship over a minor King (Art. 34); declaration by Parliament of the King's inability (Art. 35); temporary relinquishment of the exercise of royal authority (Art. 36); regency (Art. 37 and 38); the membership of the Royal House (in practice mainly consisting of members of the House of Orange) (Art. 39); its payment (Art. 40) and the organisation of the royal household by the King (Art. 41).

===== §2: King and ministers =====
Article 42 states the main principles of Dutch government: that it is formed by King and ministers (Subarticle 1) and that "the King is inviolate; the ministers are responsible" (Subarticle 2). Before 1848 the inviolacy of the King was interpreted as a judicial one: he could never be tried in court for whatever reason. This remains true, but ministerial responsibility implies there is since the revision of 1848 primarily a political inviolacy. This means that the King cannot act in a public capacity without ministerial approval: externally the governmental policy is always represented by the responsible minister who, should he feel that the King's personal influence in it threatens to become too predominant, has to resign if he cannot prevent it; what happens internally between King and ministers is the Crown Secret, never to be divulged. What little of it nevertheless has come to the public attention, shows that the common conception that the kingship since the reign of William III of the Netherlands has in fact been almost fully ceremonial, is not supported by the facts. Often it is assumed that there is a "derived ministerial responsibility" for all members of the Royal House.

The Prime Minister and the ministers are appointed and dismissed by Royal Decree (Article 43). Such decrees are also signed by the Prime Minister himself, who signs his own appointment and those of the others (Article 48). Royal decree also institutes the ministries (Article 44), which have tended to be very variable in number and scope, and non-departmental ministers (Subarticle 2), who officially have no ministry but whom in fact is assigned the necessary personnel and who sign and are responsible for a partial budget. The ministers together form the Council of Ministers (Article 45), presided by the Prime Minister (Subarticle 2), which assembles (in fact weekly) to promote the unity of the general governmental policy (Subarticle 3). Though existing since 1823, this council has only been mentioned since the revision of 1983; its constitutional powers as such are almost nil. The proceedings are secret for a period of fifty years. Outwardly the council acts as if there were complete agreement between all ministers: the so-called "homogeneity". By Royal Decree are appointed secretaries of state (Article 46); these are subordinate to a certain minister who is fully responsible for their acts (Subarticle 2). All laws and Royal Decrees have to be countersigned by the responsible minister(s) or secretaries of state (Article 47). The countersign has been mandatory since the revision of 1840. Since 1983 such laws and decrees also have to be affirmed by a signed affirmation; it is usually assumed these acts coincide. All ministers and secretaries of state have to swear an oath of purification (declaring to not having bribed anyone to obtain their office, nor having been bribed to commit certain acts when in office) and swear allegiance to the Constitution (Article 49).

The individual ministers do not have a (general) executive power, other than that which is attributed to them by special law.

==== Chapter 3: States General ====
===== §1: Organisation and composition =====
Article 50 states that there are States General and that these represent the whole of the people of the Netherlands. Thus a clear distinction is made to the situation under the confederal Dutch Republic when the States General represented the provinces. Doctrine holds that the article also entails that political parties have to give priority to the public interest, as opposed to the particular interests of their constituents. Article 51 specifies that the States General consist of a House of Representatives of the Netherlands (lower house), the Second Chamber of 150 members and a Senate (upper house), the First Chamber of 75 members — the constitution deliberately mentions the House of Representatives first to emphasize its political primate. Subarticle 4 mentions that both Houses can gather in an indivisible United Assembly of 225 members, a joint session necessary to perform some acts, such as the appointment of a new King in absence of royal heirs. When in United Assembly the President of the Senate is President of the States General (Article 62); the House of Representatives has tried to change this in the revision of 1983 but has twice been defeated by the Senate defending its privilege. The Houses sit for four years (Article 52). They are elected on basis of proportional representation (Article 53) and by a secret ballot (Subarticle 2). The House of Representatives is elected by all Dutch citizens over the age of eighteen (Article 54), except those who have been disqualified by a court sentence as part of their punishment for a crime or those who have been declared incapable by court because of insanity (Subarticle 2). Formal law can limit the right to vote to resident nationals only but presently does not. The Senate is elected by the States Provincial (Article 55).

To be eligible to be elected it is necessary to be of Dutch nationality, to be over eighteen in age and not to have been excluded from the right to vote (Article 56); there are also certain incompatibilities of function (Article 57), the most important of which is that a minister not belonging to a demissionary cabinet cannot be a member of the States General, a stark contrast with the situation in United Kingdom or Germany, but in line with the United States. This principle underlies the political dualism of Dutch politics. The Houses investigate the Letters of Credence of new members, in this case a written affirmation by the central voting office that they have indeed obtained the necessary number of votes. After the investigation new members swear four oaths: the oath of purification, the oath of allegiance to the Constitution and the oath of loyal discharge of their office are demanded by Article 60; the oath of loyalty to King and Statute is demanded by Article 47 of the Statute of the Kingdom, the higher Constitution of the Realm. All other issues pertaining the elections are regulated by formal law; delegation is possible (Article 59).

Each House appoints its own President from its members (Article 61) and a clerk, not from its own members; no officials of the States General may be member of the States (Subarticle 2). Law regulates the remuneration of the members; delegation is possible; such law can only be approved by a two-thirds majority (Article 63).

Article 64 states that government can dissolve each House by Royal Decree. Within three months elections have to be held (Subarticle 2). The duration of a new House of Representatives after dissolution is determined by law and not to exceed five years (Subarticle 4). The dissolution only takes effect when the new House meets, to avoid a period without representation. Dissolution of Parliament was in the 19th century an instrument for government to decide a conflict with the House of Representatives by submitting the issue to the voter. Unwritten law developed between 1866 and 1868 that this should not be done more than once over the same issue. The last instance occurred in 1894. In the 20th century such "conflict resolution" was replaced by "crisis resolution" whenever a political coalition fell apart and could not be reconciled; the government then resigns and instead of trying to find a new coalition majority, decides on holding new elections, normally in accordance with the wishes of parliament itself. Earlier typically an "interim cabinet" was formed to arrange for the elections, but this hasn't happened since 1982.

===== §2: Procedures =====
Article 65 states that the parliamentary year is opened on the third Tuesday of September (Prinsjesdag) by the King holding the Speech from the Throne. The same day the minister of finance presents the yearly national budget. The sessions of the States General are public (Article 66), but the session will be secret (In camera) when the House in question so decides (Subarticle 3) which can be proposed by a tenth of the quorum or the President, on which proposal the doors are closed immediately for the vote (Subarticle 2). Normally there is a quorum of a half to start a session or to take any decision (Article 67). Decisions are taken by majority (more than half of the votes, Subarticle 2) and without mandate (Subarticle 3) — a reference to the situation under the Republic when each delegate had to vote on instruction from the nobles or city councils he represented. On demand of a single member the vote must be oral and by roll call; no member may abstain.

The States General have an absolute right to information from the government in writing or in person, only constitutionally limited by State interests, such as the national security (Article 68). Doctrine holds that there can also be "natural impediments" justifying that a minister fails in answering questions, such as the circumstance that he simply doesn't know the answer, that he has already answered or that he is about to answer much more completely by issuing a written report on the question. Another doctrinal limitation is the ministerial responsibility: a minister is not obliged to give information about a subject for which not he is responsible but his colleague. Government members have access to the sessions and can freely partake in the discussions (Article 69); they can also be invited to do so by the Houses (Subarticle 2). Such an invitation is in fact an order: government members are not at liberty to refuse. They do however have the right to invite any expert to assist them in the discussions (Subarticle 3). All persons partaking in the deliberations of parliament or in the parliamentary commission meetings have legal immunity regarding any communication they made, either in speech or in writing (Article 71). Otherwise the members have no parliamentary immunity.

The States General have the right of inquiry (Article 70). They can by majority vote empower a commission that in public or secret hearings can investigate any subject. Any person in the Realm is obliged to appear and answer their questions; it is a crime not to obey. This right can be limited by formal law; delegation is possible. Sixteen such inquiries have been held since 1848, one of them, about the events in the Second World War, lasting from 1947 till 1956.

The Houses each determine their own Rules of Procedure (Article 72). As the legislative is in the Netherlands formed by parliament and government in cooperation, these Rules of Procedure are not formal laws but have a sui generis "legal" status.

==== Chapter 4: Council of State, Court of Audit, National Ombudsman and Permanent Advisory Colleges ====
Chapter 4 covers certain other High Councils of State apart from parliament. The most important of these is the Council of State (Raad van State). Any proposal of law in the broadest sense and any proposed treaty is in principle first submitted to the Council of State for legal comment; this can be limited by formal law, which however only does so for trivial cases (Article 73). Though officially such comment is merely an advice, it is very rare for law proposals to remain unchanged if the judgment of the council is negative. The council is seen as the guardian of legislative quality; no minister can ignore its opinion without dire effects on his own reputation. Thus the Council in fact codetermines the legislative process. The council also acts as the highest court for administrative appeal (Subarticle 2 and 3); it thus has the final say on the way the country is actually ruled, though this is limited by the fact such appeals can only be made on formal or procedural grounds. The large influence of the council is not always appreciated by external and internal observers. If the King is unable to exert the royal authority and there is as yet no regent, the Council exerts the royal authority (Article 38). The council is officially presided by the King (Article 74); in view of the ministerial responsibility he in fact only does so on special occasions: normally the current chairman is the vice-president of the council, some times by journalists called the "Viceroy of the Netherlands". The probable heir becomes a member of the Council when he reaches the age of eighteen and often does attend the meetings. Law can give other members of the Royal House the right to attend; it in fact determines that they nor the heir have voting powers. The members of the council, the Staatsraden, are appointed by Royal Decree for life (Subarticle 2); they can be dismissed on demand by Decree, or in cases determined by law by the Council itself, and law can determine an age limit (Subarticles 3 and 4). The competence, organisation and composition of the council are regulated by law; delegation is possible (Article 75). This competence may exceed the functions indicated in Article 73; in this case no delegation is allowed (Subarticle 2). The number of Staatsraden is determined by law at a maximum of 29 ordinary members and 50 extraordinary members.

The second is the Court of Audit (Algemene Rekenkamer). Its task is to perform financial audits (Article 76). The members are appointed for life by Royal Decree from a shortlist of three, proposed by the House of Representatives (Article 77). They can be dismissed on demand by Decree or when reaching an age determined by law (Subarticle 2); or dismissed by the Supreme Court in certain other cases determined by law (Subarticle 3). Law determines the organisation, composition and competence of the Court of Audit (Article 78); delegation is possible; this may exceed the functions indicated by Article 76; in this case no delegation is allowed (Subarticle 2). In fact the Court of Audit not only performs financial audits but also "value for money" efficiency analyses; it also reports on the effectiveness of all governmental policy via performance audits. Dutch legal doctrine believes in a clear distinction between efficiency and effectiveness reports and this is reflected in two separate types of investigation carried out. The budget as such is always officially approved, be it with "comments" when irregularities have been discovered; these then have to be remedied by special law. The effectiveness reports, carried out in great detail, in full independence and without the slightest regard for political sensitivities, have given the Court of Audit a large political influence, even more so than the British National Audit Office.

The third is the National Ombudsman, a relatively new function; he may investigate by his own initiative or on request of anyone, the actions of State bodies or other governmental bodies indicated by law; this indication can be delegated (Article 78a). The ombudsman and his substitute are appointed by the House of Representatives for a certain period of time, to be determined by law. They are in any case dismissed by the House of Representatives on demand and when reaching a certain age (Subarticle 2). Law determines the competence of the ombudsman and the way he proceeds; delegation is allowed (Subarticle 3). His competence may by law be determined to exceed that given in Subarticle 1; delegation is allowed (Subarticle 4) — in contrast with the arrangement given for the Council of State and the Court of Audit.

The constitution has a general Article 79 founding the establishment of other advisory bodies, the "permanent advisory colleges". The law regulates the organisation, composition and competence of these bodies (Subarticle 2); other competences than mere advisory ones may be attributed by law (Subarticle 3); in both cases delegation is allowed. There used to be a great many of these advisory bodies; after 1996 their number was brought back to a few to economise. The advice of all bodies indicated in Chapter 4 is in principle public; the law regulates the way it is published; delegation is allowed (Article 80); it is submitted to the States General (subarticle 2).

==== Chapter 5: Legislation and Administration ====
===== §1: Laws and other prescripts =====
The Legislative is formed by Government (i.e. King and ministers) and the States General in cooperation (Article 81), although the term "legislative" is not actually used: the article simply states that government and the States General together make laws. This means that the Dutch concept of "formal law" cannot simply be equated to "Act of Parliament", as government and parliament act in unison in creating laws. In the Dutch constitutional system there is no decisive referendum, although sometimes consultative referendums are held, like the one in 2005 in which the people advised to reject the European Constitution; the Dutch people is thus not a direct lawgiver.

Bills are presented by the King or by the House of Representatives, which thus has the right of initiative (Article 82). Some bills have to be presented by the States General in United Assembly (subarticle 2). The Senate cannot propose law. The ministers can but in fact act through the King who sends a Royal Missive (Article 83), containing the proposal, which is only signed by himself, thus without countersign. The House of Representatives has the right of amendment; government too may amend (Article 84). The Senate only can pass or reject laws in full (Article 85), defended by the responsible minister or by members of the House of Representatives having taken the initiative to propose the law; however, in practice it can send the proposal back asking for a novelle to be passed by the House of Representatives, in fact an amendment of law. Bills may be withdrawn by the proposer until passed (Article 86), but only by a majority of the House of Representatives if the bill has been presented by some members of the House of Representatives and has been passed by the House of Representatives. Bills become valid law once they have been passed by Parliament and have been affirmed by the King (Article 87). It is generally assumed that this also fulfills the demand of signature by Article 47. The affirmation needs sign and ministerial countersign but also the older Royal Order has to be signed and countersigned, ordering to publish the law in a special publication, the Staatsblad van het Koninkrijk der Nederlanden (Bulletin of Acts, Orders and Decrees of the Kingdom of the Netherlands, also called Bulletin of Acts and Decrees). Only after such publication the law has an external binding force (Article 88).

In the Dutch constitutional system there is not only formal law; also other general governmental regulations are recognised, binding the citizen; the overarching concept is called "material law". These other regulations are the "other prescripts" mentioned in the heading of §1. Only the most important subcategory of these is explicitly mentioned in the constitution, in Article 89: the Algemene maatregelen van bestuur, "General Administrative Orders". To avoid doctrinal strive over what orders exactly are covered by this concept, a consensus has developed that a strict formal definition can be applied: all general orders made by Royal Decree (Subarticle 1) that have been submitted to the Council of Ministers and to the Council of State and have been published by the Staatsblad, are General Administrative Orders. Since the Second World War a doctrinal consensus has gradually developed that all general Royal Decrees have to conform to these conditions to be valid and that earlier practices to issue general Royal Decrees without meeting these three formalities — such Decrees, general or otherwise, are called "minor Royal Decrees" — can no longer result in regulations with binding force towards the citizen. Since 1889 the constitution determines that all prescripts with a penal character have to be based on formal law and that this law imposes the penalty (Subarticles 2 and 4). This includes the Royal Decrees and thus the General Administrative Orders. A doctrinal consensus has developed, however, that all General Administrative Orders, not just those with penal content, have to be based on formal law to be valid, with the competence to regulate delegated by such law.

===== §2: Other prescripts =====
The second paragraph of Chapter 5 contains several articles of disparate administrative content; but they are not the same as the "other prescripts" of §1; the redaction of the headings is generally seen as confusing and infelicitous on this point. Most articles in §2 are combined in coherent groups.

The first of these groups consists of articles pertaining to international law and treaties. Article 90 states that it is the duty of government to promote the international rule of law. The Netherlands is home to several International Courts. Doctrine holds that this article also attributes the general right to conclude treaties. Article 91 states that the Kingdom shall not be bound by treaty without prior approval of the States General, except for those cases where law determines no such approval is necessary. Such approval may be tacit (Subarticle 2). Despite this, if not either a reservation of approval is made on conclusion of the treaty, or the treaty contains a ratification clause, treaties are according to international law binding upon conclusion. The article must thus be seen as imposing a duty upon government to arrange for such reservation or clause. Subarticle 3 determines that if a treaty conflicts with the Constitution, it has to be approved by a two-thirds majority of both Houses. Whether such conflict exists is decided by the States General; article 6 of the lower Rijkswet goedkeuring en bekendmaking verdragen determines that this decision has again to be made by special formal law. A special implementation by law of the 1992 Treaty of Maastricht determines that certain European Community decisions having force of treaty have to be approved by Parliament prior to even the conclusion itself. By treaty legislative, administrative and judicial powers may be conferred on organisations established under international law (Article 92). This has been done on many occasions, e.g. on the Benelux, the European Community, the United Nations, the Council of Europe and NATO.

According to present doctrine, that of "treaty monism", treaties are in the Dutch legal system in principle self-executing; no special transformation is needed by implementing special law, as in countries with a "dualistic" system (such as the United Kingdom). However, when the present articles covering this subject were last revisioned, in 1953, doctrine was divided and some defended a more dualistic position, that of "limited monism". They demanded the constitution to be neutral on this issue and this has led to some infelicitous results. Government originally intended that Article 93, stating that treaties of a generally binding nature would only have such binding force after they had been published, to be simply a safeguard, protecting the citizen against duties imposed on him by such treaty. However, the "limited monists" held that only such published treaties are self-executing and that thus Article 93 is the basis for all treaty monism; to appease them government stated that the article should in any case be read as covering also the treaties conferring rights on the citizen and imposing duties upon government. The unintended result was that government might thus in principle withhold rights to the citizen by not publishing the treaty. Article 94 determines that legal prescripts are inapplicable if they conflict with treaties of a generally binding nature. This means that laws can be tested against treaty norms and obligations. Dutch courts have however been very reluctant to do so, limiting this to cases where government has been left no freedom of policy at all by the treaty, or to severe formal and procedural defects. The case law is very complex and contradictory, complicated by the fact that the phrase "generally binding nature" is assumed to have exactly the same meaning in both articles. Article 95 states that law regulates the publication of treaties or (binding) decisions of international organisations; delegation is allowed.

A second group of articles consists of those pertaining to the national security. Before the revision of 1983 these were combined in a separate Chapter 10; the articles as such remained largely unchanged in 1983, but were finally fully revised in 2000. Article 96 states that a prior approval of the States General is necessary for the government (since 1983 no longer the King) to declare that the Kingdom is in a state of war. This approval must be given by the United Assembly (Subarticle 3), as it would be most embarrassing if the House of Representatives approved but the Senate withheld approval. If the existing war conditions make such an approval impossible it is not required. Indeed, the approval has little value in any case: the subject of the article is not the classic declaration of war, as such a declaration according to doctrine might constitute a war crime by implying a war of aggression forbidden by international law. It is a simple declarative statement of fact, without legal consequences, that a war situation has come to exist. The doctrine of many other nations makes no such distinction. Article 97 states that a defence force exists to defend the Kingdom and its interests and to maintain and promote the international rule of law; Subarticle 2 determines that the supreme authority over this defence force is exercised by the government; there is thus no constitutional supreme commander. This defence force consists of volunteers and may contain conscripts (Article 98). Since Napoleonic times conscription had been the rule and voluntary service the exception; this has now been inverted to accommodate the creation of a fully professional army in 1997. However, the old laws regulating conscription have only been suspended, to be reactivated in case of emergency; this is given a constitutional basis by Subarticle 2; delegation is allowed. A provision that has remained unchanged is Article 99, stating that law regulates the exemption of military service for conscientious objectors; delegation is allowed. In 2000 a new Article 99a was inserted, that law has to regulate civil defence; the older legal system regulating this issue had been largely abolished since the end of the Cold War. Delegation is allowed. Government has to inform the States General about any intended foreign deployment of Dutch forces outside of defence treaty obligations, thus to protect the international rule of law and for humanitarian missions (Article 100). In an emergency situation such information can be given after the facts. Both government and parliament tended to present this duty as a kind of implicit approval, as parliament could in principle force government to call off the mission, but the Council of State has made clear this is at least formally not the case. Article 101 (mobilisation) has been abrogated in 1995, Article 102 (defence budget and prohibition of billeting) in 2000. Article 103 states that law has to determine in which cases a Royal Decree may declare a state of emergency to maintain external or internal security; delegation is allowed. The powers of lower administrative bodies can be limited; the basic rights expressed in Articles 6,7,8,9, 12 Subarticle 2, 13 and 113 Subarticle 1 and 3 can be infringed upon (Subarticle 2). Royal Decree may end the state of emergency. The States General decide in United Assembly whether the state of emergency must be maintained, immediately after its declaration and as often as they see fit afterwards (Subarticle 3).

The third group consists of articles pertaining to financial issues. Imposed taxation must be based on formal law (Article 104). Delegation is allowed. However, to indicate this must be done hesitantly, parliament insisted on a slightly different terminology: instead of krachtens de wet, the phrase uit kracht van wet was used; both mean "by force of law" or "pursuant to law"; but the second expression puts somewhat more emphasis on the force of the law and thus on the fact all delegation is ultimately derived from law. A yearly budget is on Prinsjesdag presented to the States General, its balance sheet approved by the Court of Audit (Article 105). Delegation is not allowed. The budget debates are held by the House of Representatives, with a separate treatment of each departmental budget and of special interdepartmental budgets; since 1971, the Senate immediately approves the budget formally in exchange for full policy debates. Article 106 states that formal law regulates the monetary system. Delegation is allowed. The article has lost its relevance by the introduction of the euro in 2002; doctrine holds that the constitution does not demand a purely national system.

A fourth and last group of articles pertains to judicial issues. Article 107 is the "codification article". It imposes that that private law, penal law and the separate procedural laws covering these subjects must indeed be formal law and treated in a general Civil Code and a Penal Code, although certain subject might be covered by special laws. Delegation is allowed but doctrine holds that criminal law (which is seen as a more limited field than general penal law) must be determined by formal law only. This means provinces and municipalities cannot create their own criminal codes and government cannot make a certain act a crime by a Royal Decree not based on formal law. As the administrative law of the Netherlands is so complex, it was deemed impossible to incorporate it in a single code, but its general rules must be covered in a general code (Subarticle 2) as has indeed gradually been done since the nineties, be it with great difficulty. Article 108 (investigative bodies for civil complaints) has been abrogated in 1999. Article 109 states that the position of civil servants, including their protection and workers' participation must be determined by law. This has as yet not been done in any general way. Doctrine holds that civil servants enjoy full protection by constitutional basic rights. Article 110 imposes a duty upon government to safeguard by formal law sufficient public access to information regarding governmental activities. Delegation is allowed. The government does not see this as some general "right to public access to information" and this has been the reason not to insert it into Chapter 1, but this interpretation is quite popular in doctrine as the right does even more resemble a freedom right than a social right.

Article 111, the last of this paragraph, stands alone; it determines that formal law shall instate honorary Royal Orders of Knighthood. These are in fact the Order of William, the Order of the Netherlands Lion and the Order of Orange-Nassau. They do not include Royal House Orders, which are the personal prerogative of the King, such the House Order of Orange and the later Order of the Crown and The Order for Loyalty and Merit. Each year many thousands are honoured by the constitutional orders.

==== Chapter 6: Administration of justice ====
This chapter regulates the Dutch judicial system. The central subject is the relation between the judiciary and other courts. The term "judiciary" is not meant to indicate the Judicial of the Trias politica, but rather a purely organisational complex of judicial institutions: those courts are simply part of the judiciary that are designated as such by formal law (Article 116). Their organisation, composition and competence is regulated by law; delegation is possible (Subarticle 2). However, one safeguard that is typical of the Judicial, to guarantee its independence, is also characteristic of the Dutch judiciary: its members are appointed for life (Article 117); they can resign voluntarily or will be fired at an age determined by law (Subarticle 2); present law prescribes an age of seventy. Other principles, like impartiality, are not explicitly mentioned in the constitution. The law regulates to which extent persons who are not members of the judiciary, partake in its rulings; delegation is possible (Article 116, sub 3). This refers to (scientific or other) experts on a certain subject, not to a system of jury trials, which is absent in the Netherlands.

Article 112 states the main principle: the power to judge disputes of private law and the law of obligations is exclusively attributed to the judiciary (subarticle 1); formal law can attribute other judicial powers to either the judiciary or other courts; delegation is possible as regards the regulation of the procedures and the implementation of rulings (subarticle 2). Doctrine holds that the competence of the court is determined by the nature of the legal rule on which the plaintiff founds his claim. This implies that even in administrative disputes the citizen can always assure some legal resort, simply by bringing a tort action against the State: the judiciary is then competent. Article 115 states that in the cases covered by Article 112, sub 2, always some administrative appeal is possible. However, it does not guarantee a decision by an independent court: on 23 October 1985 the European Court of Human Rights ruled that the Crown Appeal by the Council of State, then by exclusion the highest administrative appeal court, lacked the necessary independence. This necessitated a complete revision of the Dutch administrative court system, resulting in a much expanded access to independent administrative courts.

Article 113 exclusively attributes also the power to judge offences to the judiciary. However, law can regulate the establishment by government of disciplinary courts outside of the judiciary. Delegation is possible (Subarticle 2). The judiciary is attributed the exclusive right to impose a punishment entailing a deprivation of liberty (Subarticle 3). This does not refer to forms of detention that are not punitive in nature. Law may regulate exceptions to the provisions of Article 113 in case of trials held outside of the European territory of the Netherlands or of proceedings of martial law; delegation is possible (Subarticle 4).

Article 114 entails a civil right: the prohibition of the death penalty, included by the constitutional revision of 1983 after the death penalty itself had already been abolished in 1870. The article is not a guarantee, as doctrine holds that in a state of emergency any right might be suspended by unwritten constitutional emergency law; also in principle some treaty might oblige the judge to impose the death penalty. However, in fact the Netherlands has ratified the Sixth Protocol of the European Convention on Human Rights, also containing a prohibition and having precedence over any other treaty. Therefore, since 1986 no Dutch judge has any formal competence to impose the death penalty. Nevertheless, the Dutch government might by treaty be obligated to cooperate with some international tribunal with the powers to impose the death penalty, such as the International Military Tribunal once was.

Article 118 regulates the Dutch Supreme Court, the Hoge Raad der Nederlanden. Their members are appointed from a shortlist of three, made by the House of Representatives of the States General (Subarticle 1). Formal law determines in which cases the Supreme Court may reverse judgments of lower courts (cassation) for violation of the law (Subarticle 2). The Supreme Court in revision only decides points of law, not substantial matters. Other duties may be attributed by formal law (Subarticle 3). These other duties in fact include the resolving of conflicts of competence between courts, penal trials against judges for offences committed in office, disciplinary and advisory tasks and the decision in disputes about prizes taken by Dutch vessels. Article 119 attributes the exclusive right to the Supreme Court of trying members of the States General, ministers and secretaries of state, whether incumbent or formal, for offences committed in office. It also states such a trial is instigated by either a Royal Decree or a decision by the House of Representatives.

Article 120 states that no judge will judge the constitutionality of laws and treaties. Therefore, no constitutional review of formal laws is possible; the Netherlands lack a Constitutional Court. However, regulations of lower administrative bodies may be tested against the constitution by the courts. Also any law may be tested against any self-executing treaty, though this rarely happens.

Article 121 states three safeguards for a fair trial: the first is that trials are public. The second is that judgments must specify the considerations and grounds upon which they are based. The third is that any judgment must be pronounced in public. Any exception to these principles can only be made by formal law; no delegation is possible. Article 122 states that pardon is granted by Royal Decree, on advice by a court indicated by law. Formal law regulates the procedure; delegation is possible. Also, an amnesty is possible by a special law or by force of such law; delegation is possible (Subarticle 2).

==== Chapter 7: Provinces, municipalities, water boards and other public bodies ====
The Netherlands form a decentralised unitary state, meaning that although the state is not a federation, some bodies have an autonomous power of regulation, either based on a territorial division or on a functional division.

Article 123 states that provinces and municipalities can be established and abolished by formal law, hereby indicating the two levels of territorial division. The twelve Dutch provinces still largely coincide with their medieval predecessors, with the exception of Flevoland, and North and South Holland, which were created in 1815 from Holland; the municipalities have recently been greatly decreased in number. Formal law regulates changes in their boundaries, delegation is allowed (Subarticle 2).

Article 124 states the main principles of decentralisation: provinces and municipalities are competent to regulate and administrate their internal affairs (Subarticle 1), delegation is possible — but only by the provinces and municipalities themselves (Article 128); nevertheless demands, regulated by formal law, can be made by the central government on such regulative and administrative powers; delegation is allowed (Article 124 sub 2). So the lower territorial administrative bodies have on the one hand a relative autonomy — but on the other hand they must work within the national legal framework, loyally implement national government policy and are subject to central control. This is further covered by Article 132: the standard organisation of provinces and municipalities and the composition and competence of their administrative organs is regulated by formal law (Subarticle 1); how they are controlled is regulated by law (Subarticle 2); their decisions shall only be subject to prior supervision in cases determined by law or by force of law (Subarticle 3); their decisions shall only be quashed by Royal Decree and on grounds that they violate the law (in the broadest sense: the recht) or conflict with the public interest (Subarticle 4). Law will in general regulate the kind of provisions to be made if provinces or municipalities fail to meet the demands of Article 124 sub 2 (Subarticle 5). Which taxes may be levied by provinces and municipalities and their financial relationship with the state, are determined by law (Subarticle 6).

Article 125 indicates the main administrative organs of the lower territorial administrative bodies: in the case of the provinces these are the States-Provincial; the municipalities are administrated by the municipal councils. Their sessions are public, except in cases regulated by formal law; delegation is allowed (Subarticle 1). The sessions of the States-Provincial are presided by the Commissioner of the King, those of the municipal councils by the mayor (Subarticle 3). The Commissioner of the King is also part of the provincial administration as are the Deputised States; the mayor is also part of the municipal administration, as is the College of Mayor and Aldermen (Subarticle 2). In this system the administrative organs exert the function of both the executive and legislative (Article 127); however, to form the daily administration they appoint Deputised States (for provinces) or the Colleges of Mayor and Aldermen (municipalities). In 2002 the system underwent a major revision the "aldermen" (wethouders) and States Deputised were no longer allowed to be members of the municipal councils or States Provincial respectively. This makes their function designation a misnomer, although the etymology of the word "wethouder" or "deputised" is no longer commonly understood. The Commissioner of the King and the mayor are officials, appointed by Royal Decree (Article 131). A proposed revision to introduce an elected mayor, recently was rejected by the Senate. The mayor has some legal executive powers of his own, mainly regarding the protection of public order, but these have no direct constitutional basis, they are delegated by the national legislator. Article 126 states, however, that formal law may determine that instructions regarding his office may be given to the Commissioner of the King by the national government. For cases of gross neglect of administrative duty, formal law will regulate the kind of provisions to be made in deviation of Articles 125 and 127 (Article 132, sub 4)

The members of the States-Provincial and the municipal council are directly elected by their constituents. The conditions of the right to elect and be elected are the same as those regarding the elections of the House of Representatives (Article 129 sub 1). However, formal law may give inhabitants of municipalities, that do not have the Dutch nationality, the right to elect, and be elected in, the municipal council, if they meet the other conditions (Article 130). This right has indeed been given to certain categories of foreign nationals, e.g. all citizens of the European Union. The elections take place within a system of proportional representation (Article 129 sub 2); the vote is secret and the organisation of the voting is regulated by law (Subarticle 3). The term of the States-Provincial and the municipal council is four years, unless formal law determines otherwise (Subarticle 4) Law determines possible incompatibilities of function, and may determine that family ties, marriage or the commission of acts indicated by such law may lead to a loss of membership (Subarticle 5). E.g. membership of a municipal council is incompatible with that of the Council of Ministers; a lawyer will lose his membership of a municipal council if he represents his municipality in court. All members vote without mandate (Subarticle 6). This is a reference to the situation under the Republic when the members of the States of a province voted on instruction from the city councils they represented.

==== Chapter 8: Amending the constitution ====
To amend the constitution, the proposed changes must first be approved by both the House of Representatives and the Senate of the States General with a simple majority (more than 50%). This law is called a voorstelwet or 'law to propose changes to the constitution' (lit. proposal law) and does not alter the constitution, but declares there are sufficient grounds for a certain proposal to change the constitution to be considered. The House of Representatives must then be dissolved and general elections held. The proposed changes to the constitution are then discussed a second time, this time needing a two-thirds majority in both houses of the States General to approve them. This is intended to give voters a say in the matter, by allowing them the opportunity to elect a parliament to vote down the changes if desired. In practice, however, instead of disbanding the House of Representatives and having early elections, the proposal law is simply considered after the next regularly scheduled elections have been held. Consequently, unless early elections are held for some reason (e.g. following the collapse of the government) changes to the constitution can only occur once every four years. In earlier versions of the amendment process, the Senate was also dissolved whenever general elections were held and both Houses had approved a law to propose changes to the constitution. This was deemed a pointless addition to procedure, however, as the Senate is elected by the States-Provincial and the States-Provincial are not dissolved following the adoption of a proposal in parliament (see elections in the Netherlands). The Senate will therefore invariably have the same composition unless provincial elections are held as well. Neither holding provincial elections specially for this purpose, nor postponing consideration of the proposal to change the constitution until after the regularly scheduled provincial elections is considered a desirable alternative. Changes that involve the relations between the countries of the Kingdom must be proposed by a law formulated by the Government of the Realm.

==== Additional articles ====
There used to be several additional articles with Roman numbering; however, all except articles IX and XIX are now abrogated.

== Charter for the Kingdom of the Netherlands ==
Each of the four countries within the Kingdom of the Netherlands (The Netherlands, Aruba, Curaçao and Sint Maarten) has its own constitution or "basic law". These constitutions are legally subjected to the Charter for the Kingdom of the Netherlands, which is the constitution of the entire Kingdom. The Charter however, mainly describes the relations between the different parts of the Kingdom. In addition it stipulates that each country is obliged to promote human rights, listed in a special bill of rights, and decent governance. The Kingdom of the Netherlands is a federacy, where the central government gives considerable autonomy to some parts of the kingdom (Aruba, Curaçao and Sint Maarten), but retains control over a large part (European Netherlands). There is a Government of the Realm, a Legislative of the Realm and a Supreme Court of the Realm. However, these bodies are only fully formed on special occasions and by appointing special Antillian members to the normal Dutch government, parliament and Supreme Court. One of the members of the Dutch council of ministers is always also appointed a permanent "Minister of Antillian Affairs". Since 1998 this is the Minister of the Interior and Kingdom Relations; when he is acting in this capacity the council has the status of the Government of the Realm to treat minor issues. Though the Charter is in principle higher than the Dutch Constitution, there is no legal mechanism to enforce this. The Dutch Supreme Court has consistently ruled that it is forbidden for judges to test laws and administrative acts against the Charter. However the Government of the Realm can strike void any law of Aruba, Curaçao and Sint Maarten for being incompatible with the Statute. This asymmetry and the fact that foreign affairs and the defence of the Kingdom are administered by the Dutch Government in its capacity of Government of the Realm show that the frame of government of the Kingdom has also elements of a decentralised unitary state. The Charter can only be changed with the consent of all countries within the Kingdom; the laws to this effect can be adopted with a simple absolute majority in each of their parliaments.

== General precepts ==
Although the constitution itself is the primary body of constitutional law in the Netherlands, it is not the only law that contains constitutional codification. A number of general precepts are encoded in a separate law known as the Law on general precepts (the Wet Algemene bepalingen). These precepts cover a number of varying topics ranging from applicability of different types of laws to persons or territories, to regulations mandating that judges must hear all cases brought before them.

== See also ==
- Constitutionalism
- Principle of legality in French criminal law
- Rule according to higher law
