= High Council =

High Council may refer to:

== Fiction ==
- High Council of Time Lords, the governing body of the Time Lords in Doctor Who
- Royal Institute of Maigic: The High Council, the 6th and last book of the Royal Institute of Magic series.
- High Council, the governmental body of The Covenant faction in the Halo video game series
- High Council, the leadership of the Alliance in the Star Wars New Jedi Order novel series
- High Council of the Landsraad, an inner circle of the Landsraad which arbitrated disputes among Houses in the Dune universe
- Jedi High Council, an institution from the Star Wars film series
- Klingon High Council, the supreme ruling body of the Klingon Empire in the fictional Star Trek universe
- Asgard High Council, the supreme ruling entity of the Asgard race in the fictional Stargate franchise

== Religion ==
- High council (Latter Day Saints), a governing body that has existed in the church hierarchy of many Mormon/Latter Day Saint denominations
- High Council of B'nei Noah, a group of Noahides who gathered in Israel on Monday January 10, 2006
- High Council of The Salvation Army, the body made up of the Chief of the Staff, active Commissioners, and active Territorial Commanders

== Other fields ==
- High Council of State (Algeria), a collective Algerian presidency set up by the military in 1992 following the annulled elections in December 1991
- High Council of State (Netherlands)
- High Judicial and Prosecutorial Council, an institution responsible for many aspects of the judicial system in Bosnia and Herzegovina
- Spanish High Council for Scientific Research, a council in Spain
- High Council of the Treaty of Amity and Cooperation in Southeast Asia, charged with the peaceful settlement of disputes.
