= Council of Ministers (Netherlands) =

Executive council of the Dutch Government

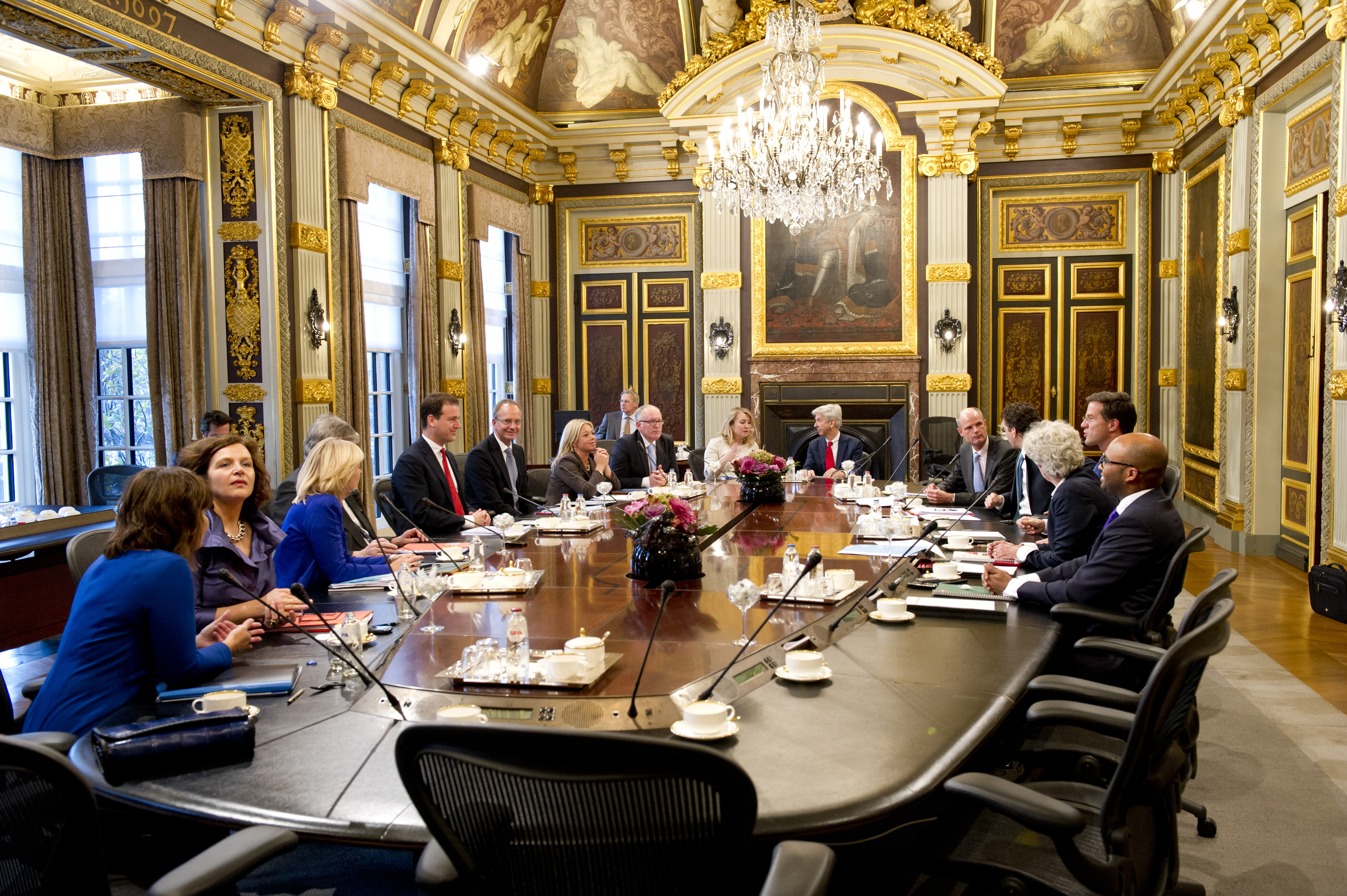
First meeting of the Second Rutte cabinet in the Trêveszaal in the Binnenhof, 5 November 2012

The Council of Ministers (Dutch: Ministerraad) is the executive council of Dutch Government, formed by all the ministers including the deputy prime ministers. This executive council initiates laws and policy. The Council of Ministers is distinct from the cabinet which also includes state secretaries. State secretaries do not attend the Council of Ministers unless they are requested to do so and they do not have voting rights.

The Council of Ministers meets every week on Friday in the Trêveszaal (English: Room of Treaties) of the Binnenhof. It makes decisions by means of collegiate governance. All ministers, including the Prime Minister, are (theoretically) equal. These meetings are chaired by the Prime Minister, or by the first Deputy Prime Minister if the Prime Minister is traveling abroad or incapacitated. Prime Minister Dick Schoof broke with precedent by announcing in 2024 that meetings would be postponed to Monday in case he could not attend. After each Council of Ministers, a press conference is held at the Nieuwspoort by the Prime Minister. The political parties that form the governing coalition individually organize consultations on Thursday evening with their ministers and parliamentary group to prepare for the Council of Ministers.

Behind the closed doors of the Trêveszaal, ministers can freely debate proposed decisions and express their opinion on any aspect of cabinet policy. Matters discussed at Council meetings are confidential, and the minutes are made public after 20 years. Once a decision is made by the council, all individual members are bound by it and are obliged to support it publicly. Members of the cabinet will step down after not agreeing with a particular decision of the government. Generally much effort is put into reaching relative consensus on any decision. A process of voting within the Council does exist, but is hardly ever used.

Together with the King, the Council of Ministers forms the Government, also known as the Crown, which makes all the major decisions. In practice the King does not participate in the daily decision-making of government, although he is kept up to date by weekly visits (on Monday) of the Prime Minister. The Dutch Constitution does not speak of cabinet, but instead only of the Council of Ministers and Government.

== See also ==
- Council of Ministers of the Kingdom of the Netherlands
