= National Ombudsman =

Dutch political office

- Nationale Ombudsman
- National Ombudsman logo
- Status: Active
- Reports to: House of Representatives
- Residence: The Hague, Netherlands
- Website: www.nationaleombudsman.nl

The National Ombudsman (in Dutch: Nationale Ombudsman) is a Dutch political office. The National Ombudsman deals with citizens' complaints against improper conduct of government and is appointed by cabinet on the advice of the House of Representatives (Tweede Kamer).

The National Ombudsman is a High Council of State.
