= Court of Audit (Netherlands) =

Government auditing body in the Netherlands

The Court of Audit (in Dutch: Algemene Rekenkamer) is an independent body that audits the spending of the national government on its efficiency and legitimacy. The Court of Audit is appointed by the cabinet of the Netherlands on the advice of the House of Representatives of the Netherlands. The Court of Audit is a High Council of State. It was established in 1814.

In 2026 the Court of Audit set up an online dashboard to improve the public visibility of the government's performance.

It is a member of the International Organization of Supreme Audit Institutions.

== Similar institutions ==
- Audit Scotland
- Auditor General of Canada
- Badan Pemeriksa Keuangan (Indonesia)
- Comptroller and Auditor General
- Cour des Comptes (France)
- Government Accountability Office (United States)
- United Kingdom National Audit Office
