= High Council of State (Netherlands) =

Type of governmental body in the Netherlands

A High Council of State (in Dutch: Hoog College van Staat) is a Council of which the independence is guaranteed in the Constitution of the Netherlands. There are five High Councils of State: the Senate and House of Representatives, the Dutch Council of State, the Court of Audit and the National Ombudsman.
