= Special school (Netherlands) =

Category of schools in the Netherlands

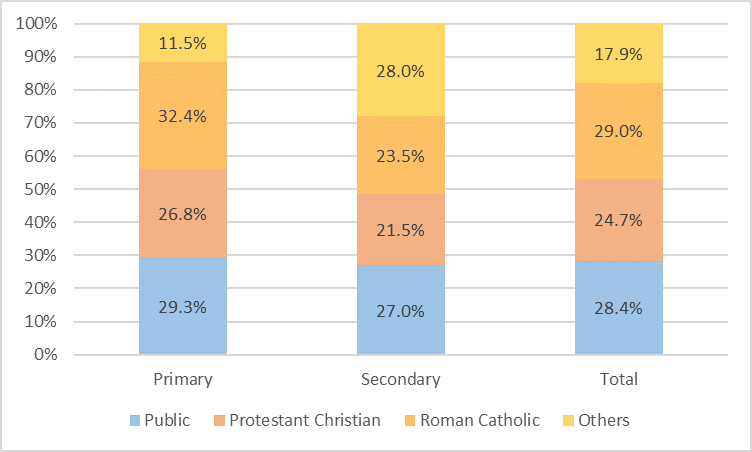
Percentages of the denominations in education in the Netherlands in 2020.

In the Dutch education system, particular education ("bijzonder onderwijs") refers to a separate category of education distinct from both public and private education, in which a school is administered by an independent board, as opposed to a government authority, while still receiving government funding.

About two thirds of pupils in the Netherlands attend particular education. Particular schools are comparable to the concept of a charter school, with the additional characteristic of being grounded in a particular religious denomination or educational philosophy, although confusingly many state-operated schools also have chosen a distinct educational philosophy. Particular education is not to be confused with "speciaal onderwijs", which refers to schools specialized to deal with physical and/or learning disabilities.

== Definition ==
Particular education schools teach on the basis of religion, philosophy of life or a vision of education. Public school lessons are not based on religion or belief. The government pays for both types of education. For this, schools must meet conditions. For example, education must be of sufficient quality. There are also requirements, for example, for the minimum number of pupils, the competence of teachers and the number of hours of education.

Particular schools differ from both public and private schools in the way they are funded and run. While privately run, particular schools are not altogether outside the control of the Dutch Ministry of Education, as they are subsidized on equal footing with public schools, and cannot charge tuition over the statutory rate. They are therefore also distinct from private schools—of which there are a small but increasing number in the country—which get no subsidies and can charge market tuition.

=== Public schools ===
Public schools are open to every student and teacher. Education is not based on religion or belief. There are public schools that teach from certain educational principles. The municipality must ensure that there is enough public education. This is also stated in Article 23 of the Dutch Constitution on freedom of education. When there are not enough public schools in the area, then the municipality ensures that children receive public education in a different way. For example, by arranging transport to a public school.

=== Particular schools ===
Special schools teach from a certain direction, which is a religious or philosophical belief. A special school is usually created, because parents need a school of a particular religious or pedagogical direction.

== Subcategories ==
Particular education can be further subdivided into two categories:

- Denominational Particular Education ("confessioneel bijzonder onderwijs") refers to schools grounded in a religious denomination, often founded by or linked to church boards or religious foundations. Examples of denominational schools are Christian schools, including Roman Catholic, Evangelical, and Protestant Reformed, as well as Islamic, Jewish, and Hindu schools. Denominational schools represent the majority of particular schools.
- General Particular Education ("algemeen bijzonder onderwijs") refers to a minority of particular schools not rooted in religion but operating on a particular educational concept, such as Dalton education, Montessori education, Jenaplan education, and Waldorf education.

In practice, classification is complicated by schools that combine aspects of denominational and general, as well as public and particular education, for instance schools that adhere to an educational philosophy while lacking an independent school board, and schools combining denominational and educational philosophy in their teaching.

== History ==
The distinction between particular and public education arose from the hugely influential school struggle, which dominated Dutch politics from the mid-19th century until the Pacification of 1917, when public and religious schools were granted equal rights to government funding under article 23 of the Dutch constitution.

== Criticism ==
Since the post-World War II decline of the pillarization of Dutch society along ideological lines, and the rapid secularization of Dutch society, government funding of particular schools has in recent years become a topic of debate once again, with several political parties calling for an amendment or revoking of article 23 of the constitution.
