= Antithesis (Netherlands) =

The Antithesis (Dutch: Antithese) is a conflict between Christian democratic and confessional parties, united in the Coalition; and Liberal parties, united in the Concentration between 1888 and 1918. The conflict concerned the equalisation of payment for religious schools. The realisation of this necessitated a constitutional revision, which needed the support of two-thirds of both houses of parliament. Both political parties held about fifty per cent of the MPs, however. The issue was forced by Anti-Revolutionary Party leader Abraham Kuyper, who hoped that an alliance of Catholics and Protestants would gain the necessary number of seats, but this strategy failed. The issue was finally resolved in the Pacification of 1917.

== See also ==
- Pillarisation
