= Diemen =

- Town and municipality
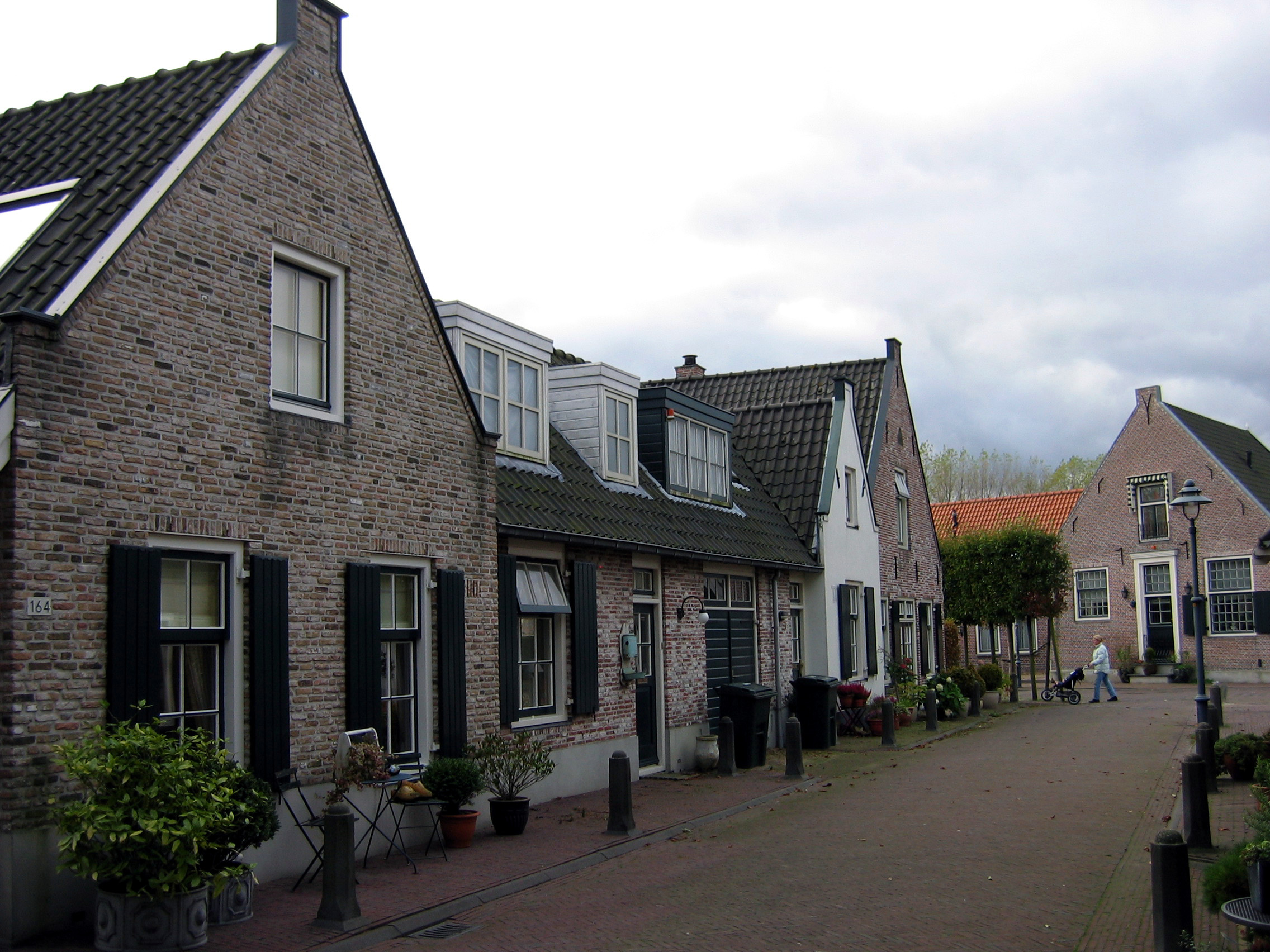
- A view of Diemen

- Flag Coat of arms

- Location in North Holland and the Netherlands
- Coordinates: 52°20′N 4°58′E
- Country: Netherlands
- Province: North Holland

Government
  - Body: Municipal council
  - Mayor: Erik Boog (D66)

Area
  - Total: 14.04 km^{2} (5.42 sq mi)
  - Land: 11.99 km^{2} (4.63 sq mi)
  - Water: 2.05 km^{2} (0.79 sq mi)
- Elevation: −1 m (−3.3 ft)

Population (January 2021)
  - Total: 31,334
  - Density: 2,613/km^{2} (6,770/sq mi)
- Demonym: Diemenaar
- Time zone: UTC+1 (CET)
  - Summer (DST): UTC+2 (CEST)
- Postcode: 1110–1113
- Area code: 020
- Website: www.diemen.nl

Diemen (Dutch pronunciation: [ˈdimə(n)]) is a town and municipality with a population of 31,334 in the province of North Holland, Netherlands. It is located approximately 6 km (3.7 mi) southeast of Amsterdam's city centre, within the Amsterdam metropolitan area.

== Etymology ==
The name Diemen comes from the river Diem, which originates from die eme, meaning the water.

== Geography ==
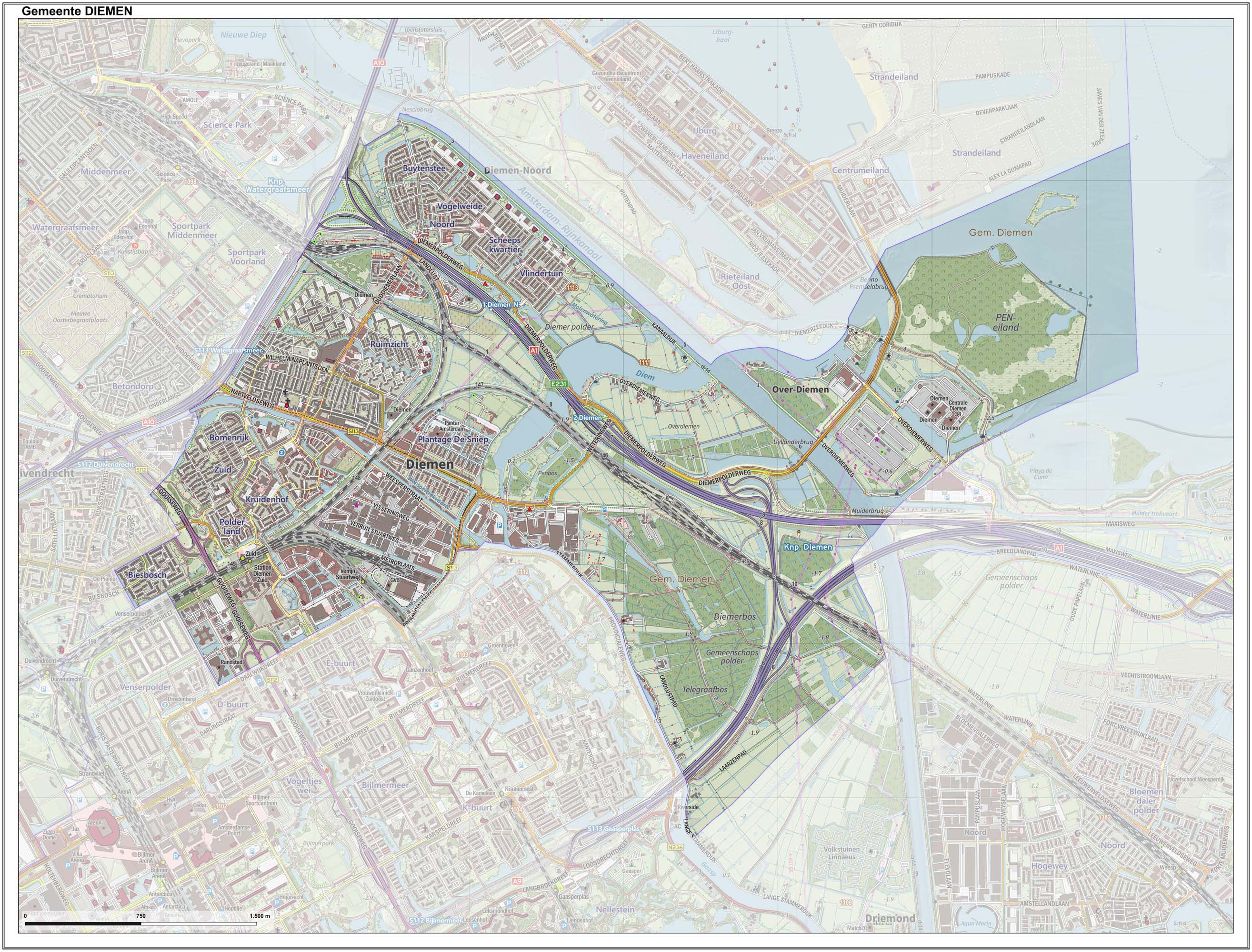
2015 Map of the municipality Diemen

Diemen is located in the province North Holland, in the west of the Netherlands. The town is part of the urban area of Amsterdam and is situated between Amsterdam-Oost (IJburg, Watergraafsmeer), Ouder-Amstel (Duivendrecht), Amsterdam-Zuidoost (Bijlmer, Driemond), and Muiden.

Three waterways cross the municipality: the Weespertrekvaart from west to south, the Amsterdam–Rhine Canal from north to east, and the river Diem from south to north. The river is the namesake of Diemen. The town can be divided into three neighbourhoods: Diemen Noord, Diemen Centrum, and Diemen Zuid.

Diemen Noord (English: North Diemen) is located on the south bank of the Amsterdam–Rhine Canal, which separates it from the Amsterdam neighbourhood IJburg, on the west bank of the river Diem, and on the north side of the Amsterdam–Zutphen railway. The area contains houses, a few of which are recreated late medieval houses, a minor shopping centre, and in the east a green area called Diemerpolder.

Diemen Centrum (English: Diemen Centre) extends from the Watergraafsmeer in the west, from which it is separated by the A10 motorway, all the way to the north-east of municipality with the rural area Overdiemerpolder, an electricity plant, and the green area Diemervijfhoek. The neighbourhood contains houses and apartment buildings, the largest shopping centre, and the town hall. The train station Diemen is located between Noord and Centrum.

Diemen Zuid (English: South Diemen) is located next to Duivendrecht, Bijlmer, and Driemond. It contains houses and apartment buildings, a minor shopping centre, and a location of Inholland University of Applied Sciences. On the south-west border is the railway station Diemen Zuid for metros and trains. The east part of the neighbourhood contains an industrial area and a green area called Diemerbos.

== Demographics ==
The municipality has a population of 25,915 and a population density of 2,161/km^{2} (5,600/sq mi). 51,2% had a Dutch background and 48,8% with a non-Dutch background

== Government ==
The municipal government consists of the executive college of the mayor and aldermen and the elected municipal council. The municipal building is located at the D.J. den Hartoglaan 1.

The municipal council of Diemen consists of 23 elected members. The seats divided as follows at the 2026 local elections:

- GreenLeft / PvdA – 8 seats
- D66 – 5 seats
- VVD – 3 seats
- Onafhankelijk Diemen – 3 seats
- Ouderenpartij Diemen – 2 seats
- Ons Diemen – 2 seats

After the 2026 elections, a GreenLeft / PvdA and D66 coalition was formed. The mayor is Erik Boog (D66).

== Transportation ==
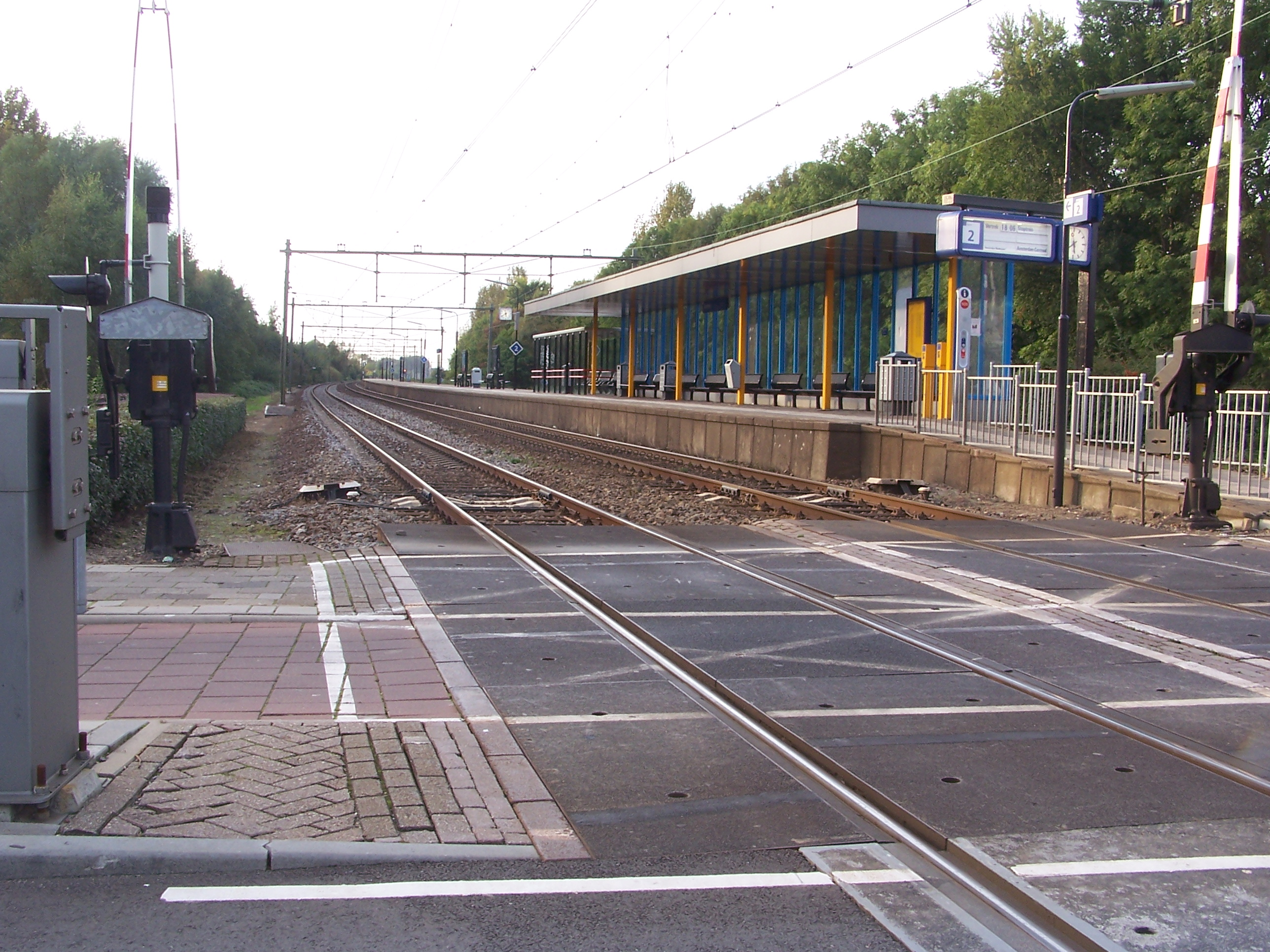
Diemen railway station

The motorways A1 (E231) and A9 pass through the municipality of Diemen, and the motorway A10 (Amsterdam ring) lies just outside the municipal border with Amsterdam.

Diemen has two train stations, Diemen on the Amsterdam–Zutphen railway and Diemen Zuid on the Weesp–Leiden railway. All train services to and from Diemen are operated by the Nederlandse Spoorwegen (NS). The railway station Diemen Zuid connects the town to the metro network of the Gemeentelijk Vervoerbedrijf (GVB).

Tram (line 19), bus and night bus services connect Diemen to Amsterdam and other towns in the area.

Bus service line 44 drives from Diemen North to the railway and metrostation Amsterdam Bijlmer Arena

Metro line 53 stops at two stations (Diemen Zuid and Verrijn Stuartweg) in the Southern district of the town.

== Education ==
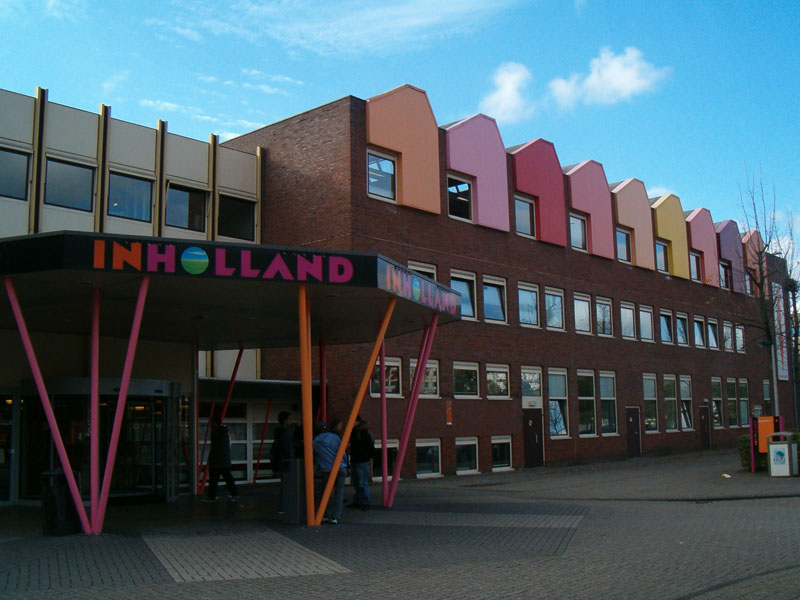
The University of Applied Sciences Inholland has a location in Diemen

There are six primary schools in Diemen. The three public schools are De Octopus, De Venser, and 'de Noorderbreedte. The two ecumenical schools are De Ark and De Kersenboom, which is both public and ecumenical. De Nieuwe Kring is a Jenaplan school and Sint-Petrusschool is a Roman Catholic school. 't Palet and De Duif merged in 2014 and formed the Noorderbreedte. 't Palet was a public school and De Duif was an ecumenical school.

There are no secondary schools in Diemen. The nearest secondary schools are in Amsterdam and Weesp.

There are two institutes of tertiary education in Diemen: the universities of applied sciences HBO Nederland and Inholland both have a location in Diemen Zuid. The nearest universities are in Amsterdam.

== Notable people ==
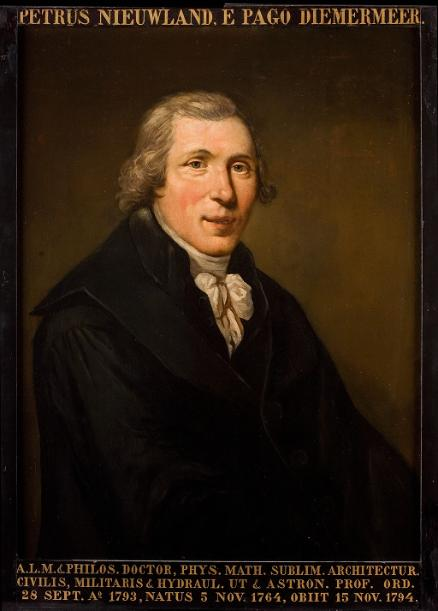
Pieter Nieuwland, 1803

- Pieter Nieuwland (1764 in Diemermeer – 1794) a Dutch nautical scientist, chemist, mathematician and poet
- Rudi Falkenhagen (1933 in Diemen – 2005) a Dutch actor

=== Sport ===
- Barend Bonneveld (1887 in Diemen – 1978) a Dutch heavyweight wrestler, competed at the 1912 and 1920 Summer Olympics
- Maarten Arens (born 1972 in Diemen) a Dutch judoka
- Junas Naciri (born 1973 in Diemen) a Dutch retired footballer with 336 club caps
- Levi Heimans (born 1985 in Diemen) a Dutch track cyclist, competed at the 2004 Summer Olympics
- Daley Blind (born 1990 in Diemen) a Dutch professional footballer playing for AFC Ajax with over 300 club caps and over 70 international caps
- Adam Maher (born 1993 in Diemen) a Dutch professional footballer with over 200 club caps
- Riejanne Markus (born 1994 in Diemen) a Dutch world champion cyclist

== Gallery ==
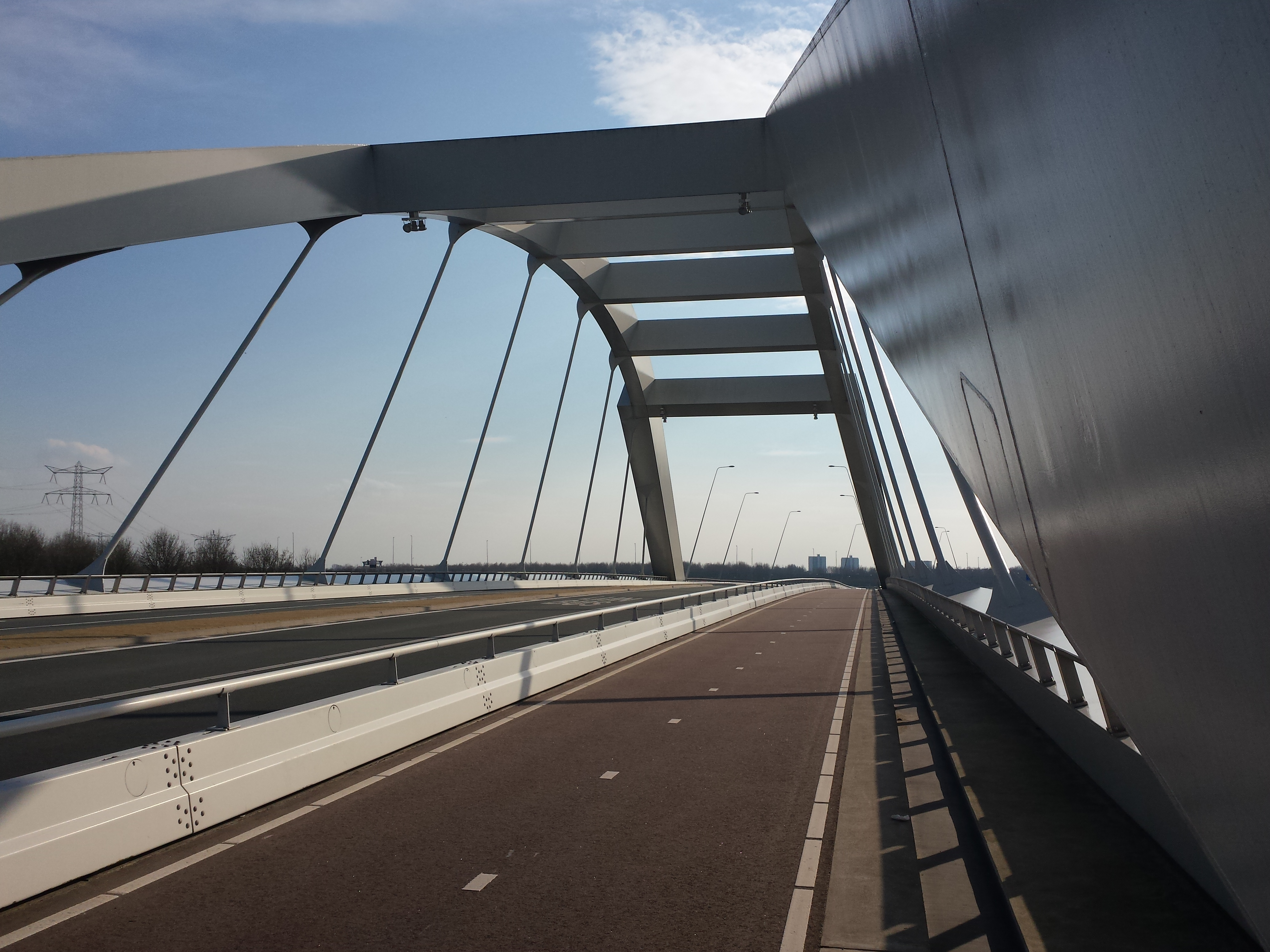
Diemen, panoramio

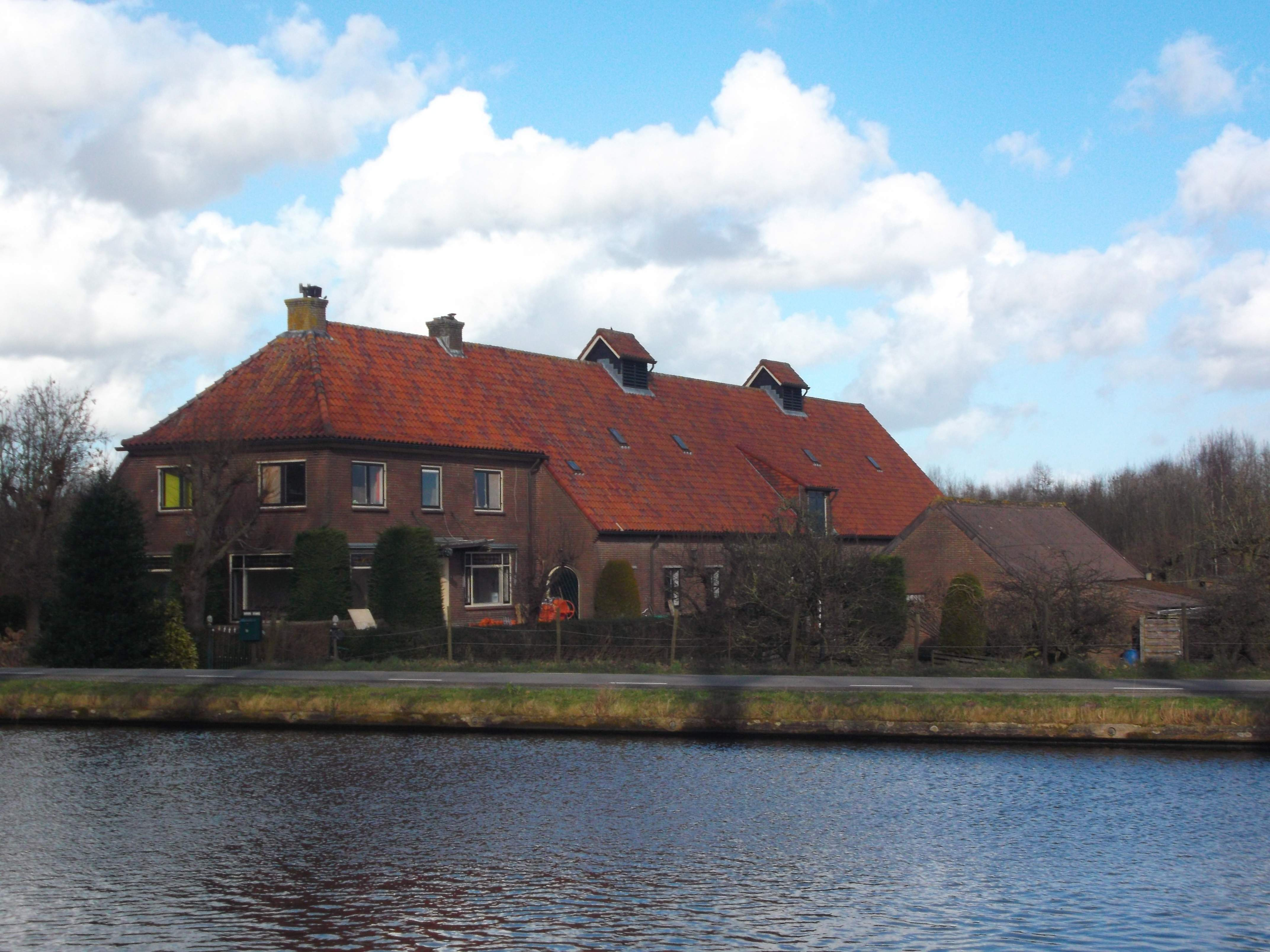
Stammerdijk 36 Driemond Diemen

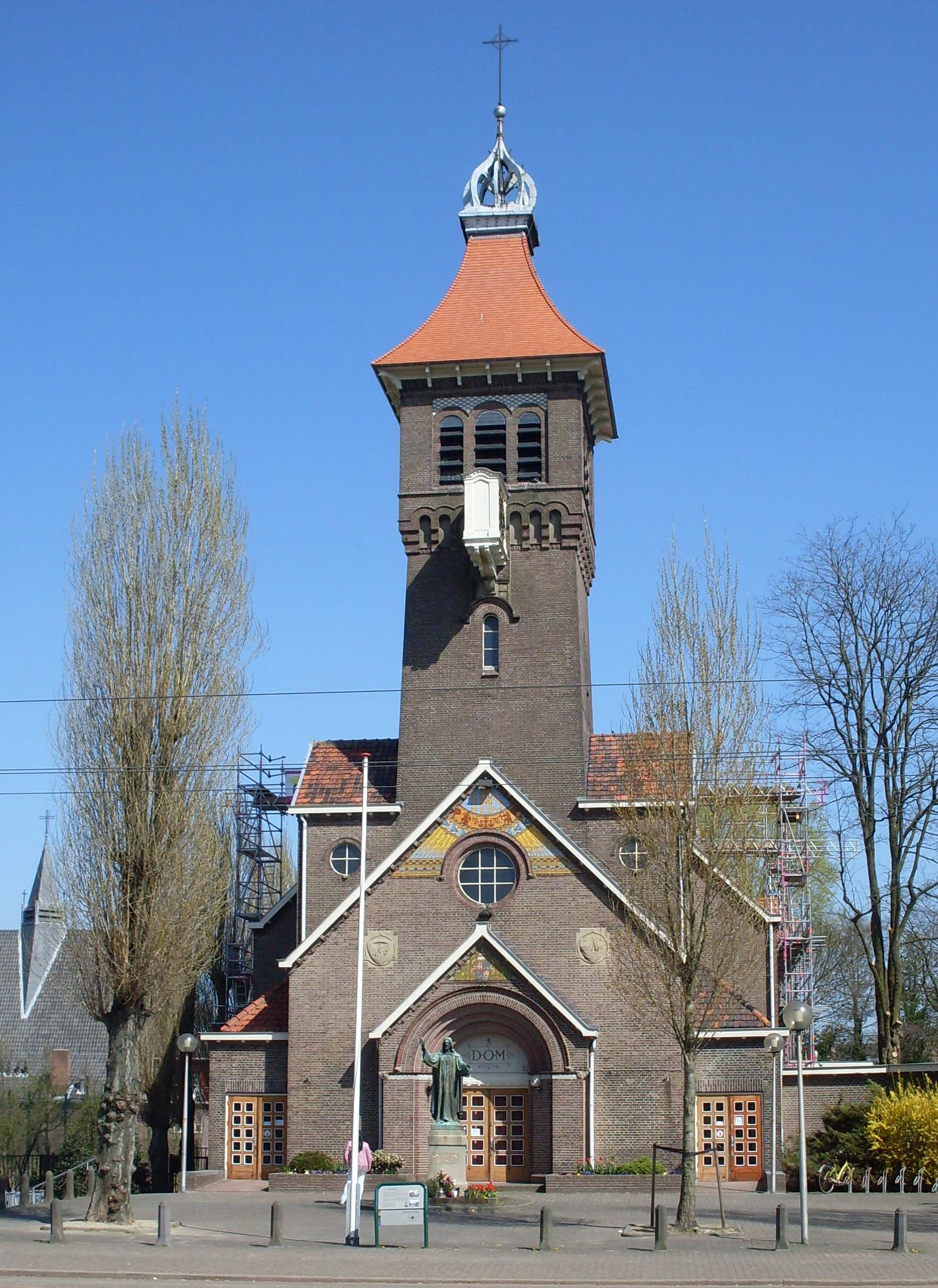
Sint-Petrusbandenkerk, Diemen

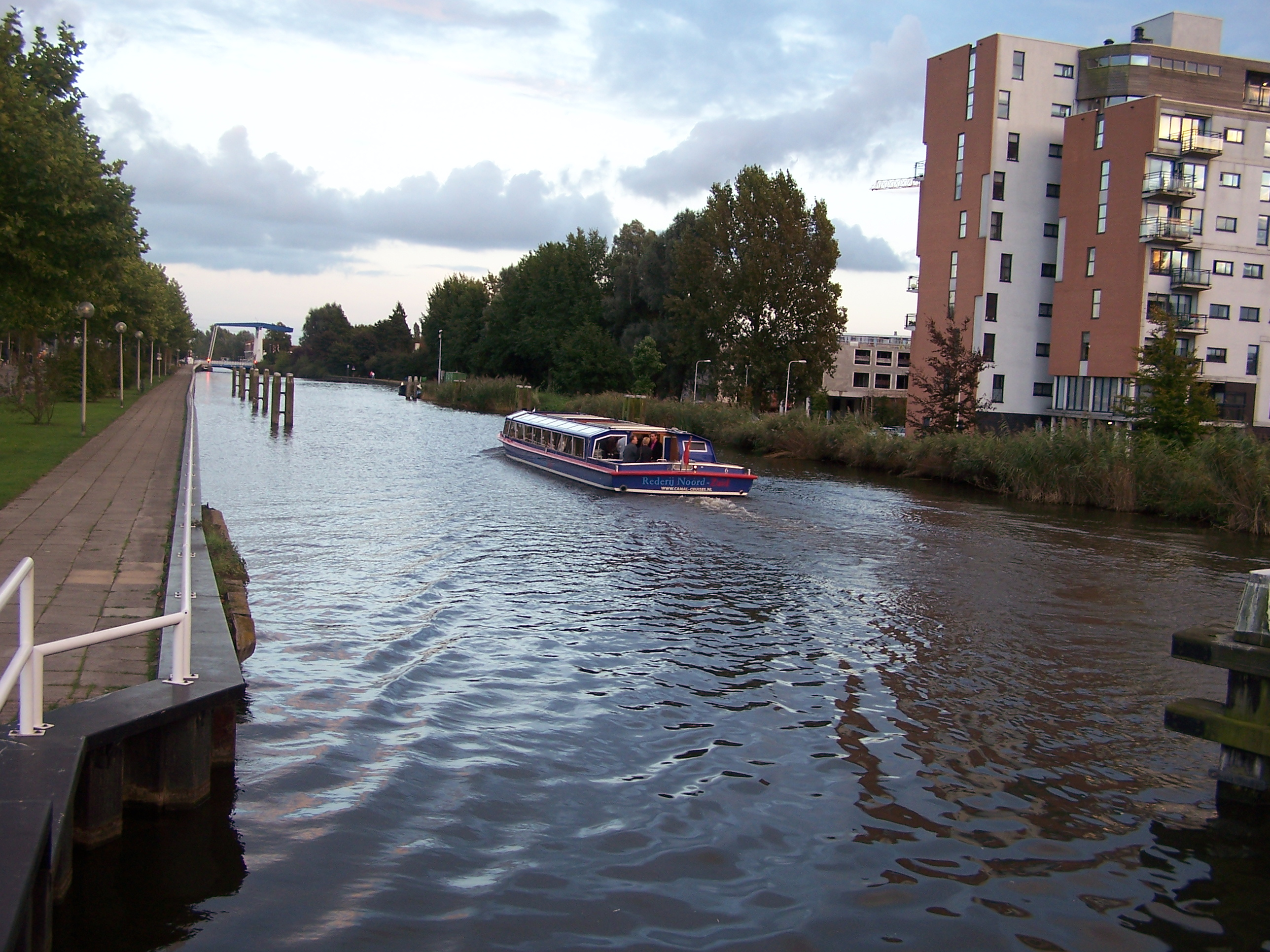
Weespertrekvaart

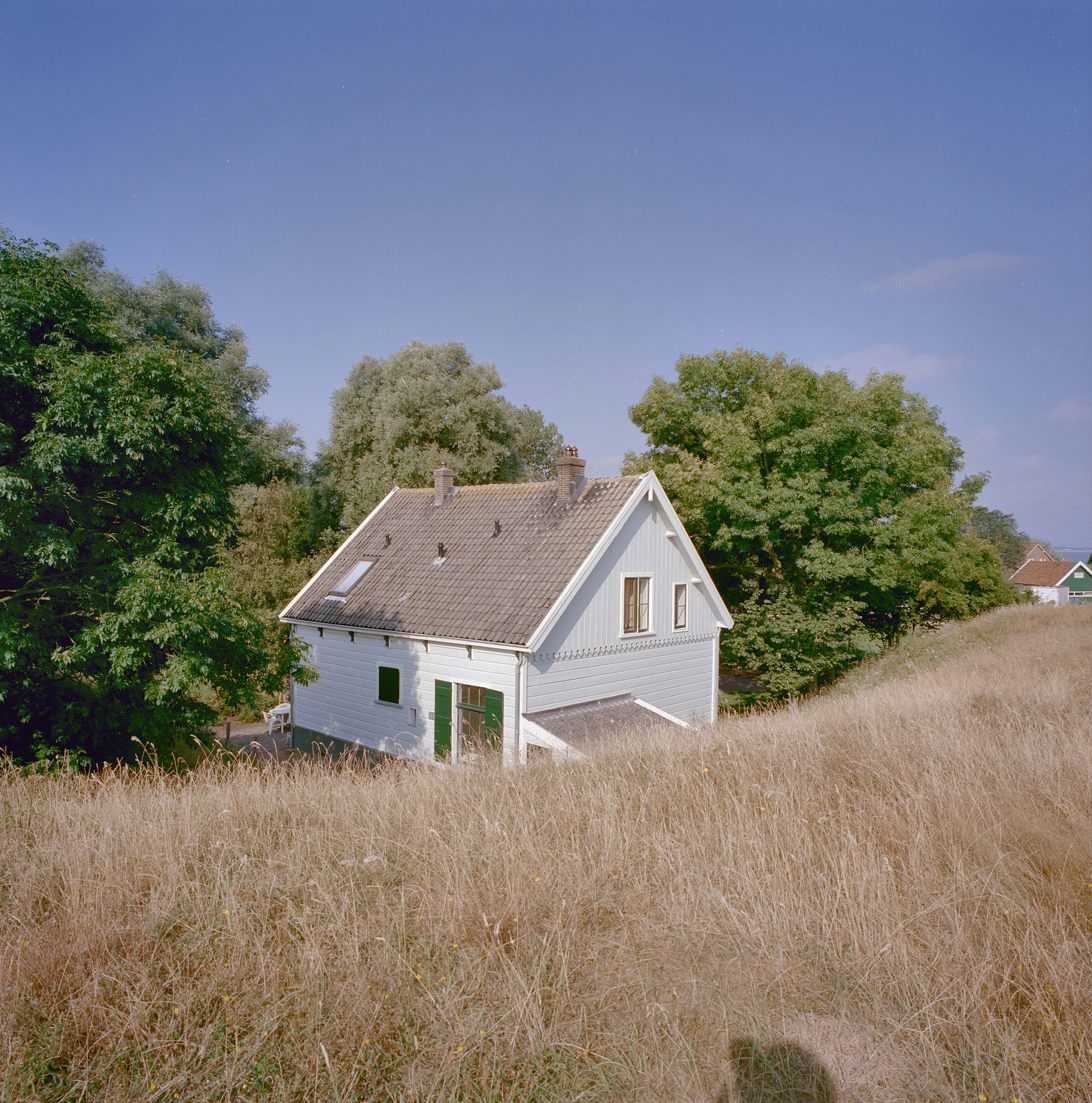
Fortwachterswoning - Diemen
