= Inholland University of Applied Sciences =

Dutch university with eight campuses

- Hogeschool Inholland
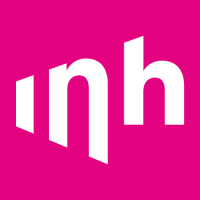
- Motto: Leren = durven
- Motto in English: Learning = being courageous
- Type: Public University of Applied Sciences
- Established: 1 September 2002 - mergers of higher vocational education institutions in the provinces of North and South Holland
- Chairperson: Bart Combee
- Students: +37,000; +7000 international students
- Location: Randstad: The Hague; Amsterdam; Haarlem; Alkmaar; Delft; Diemen; Dordrecht; Rotterdam, North Holland, South Holland, Netherlands
- Campus: Urban; Multiple campuses
- Colours: Magenta
- Website: www.inholland.nl
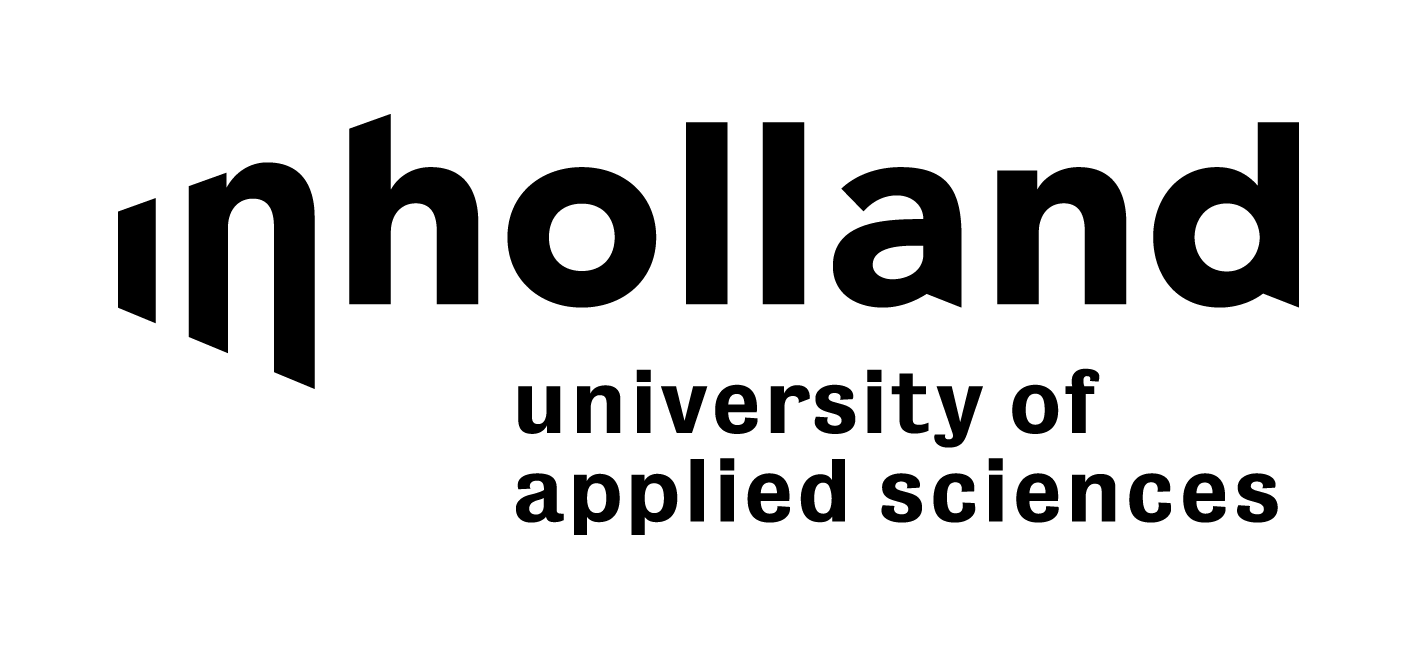

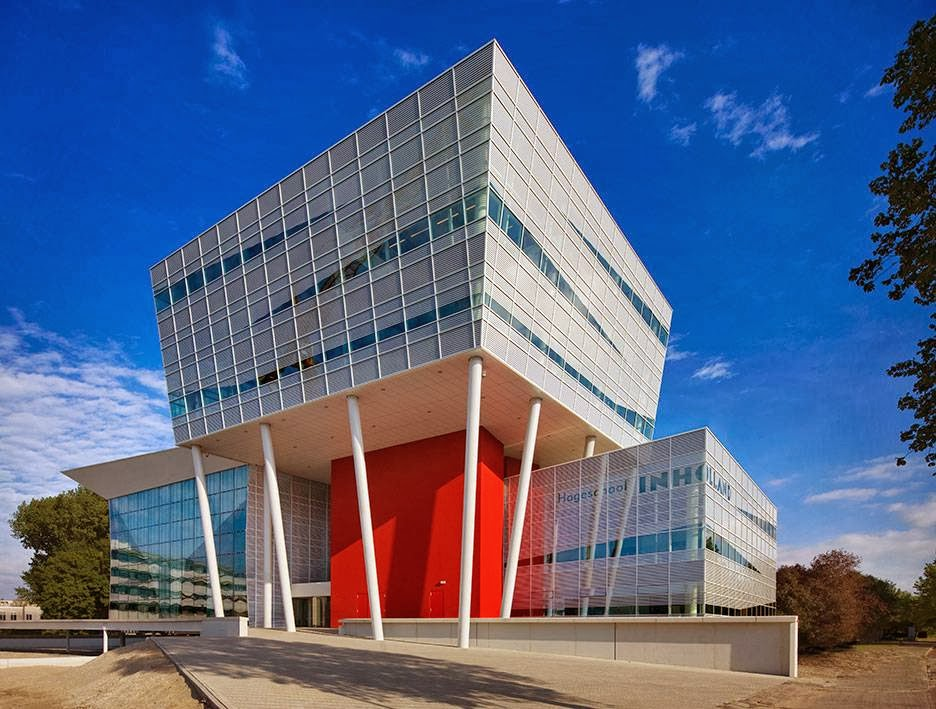
Inholland Delft Campus

Inholland University of Applied Sciences (Dutch: Hogeschool Inholland; French: Université des sciences appliquées d'Inholland; German: Hochschule Inholland) is a large university of applied sciences located in eight main cities of the Randstad, the central-western region of the Netherlands and the country's economic, political and cultural hub. With over 37,000 students from more than 100 countries, the university follows the applied sciences mode of education.

There are two sorts of universities in Dutch higher education: research universities and universities of applied sciences. Research universities are essentially accountable for offering research-oriented programs, while universities of applied sciences offer courses that focus on the practical application of arts and sciences with the main focus on real-life practice and career preparation.

Between 2007 and 2010, the chairman of the Executive Board was Geert Dales. In the period 2010 to December 2014, the position was filled by Doekle Terpstra. He was succeeded on 1 December 2014 by Jet de Ranitz.

== Campuses ==
Inholland University has campuses in the following cities:

- Alkmaar
- Amsterdam
- Delft
- The Hague
- Diemen
- Dordrecht
- Haarlem
- Rotterdam

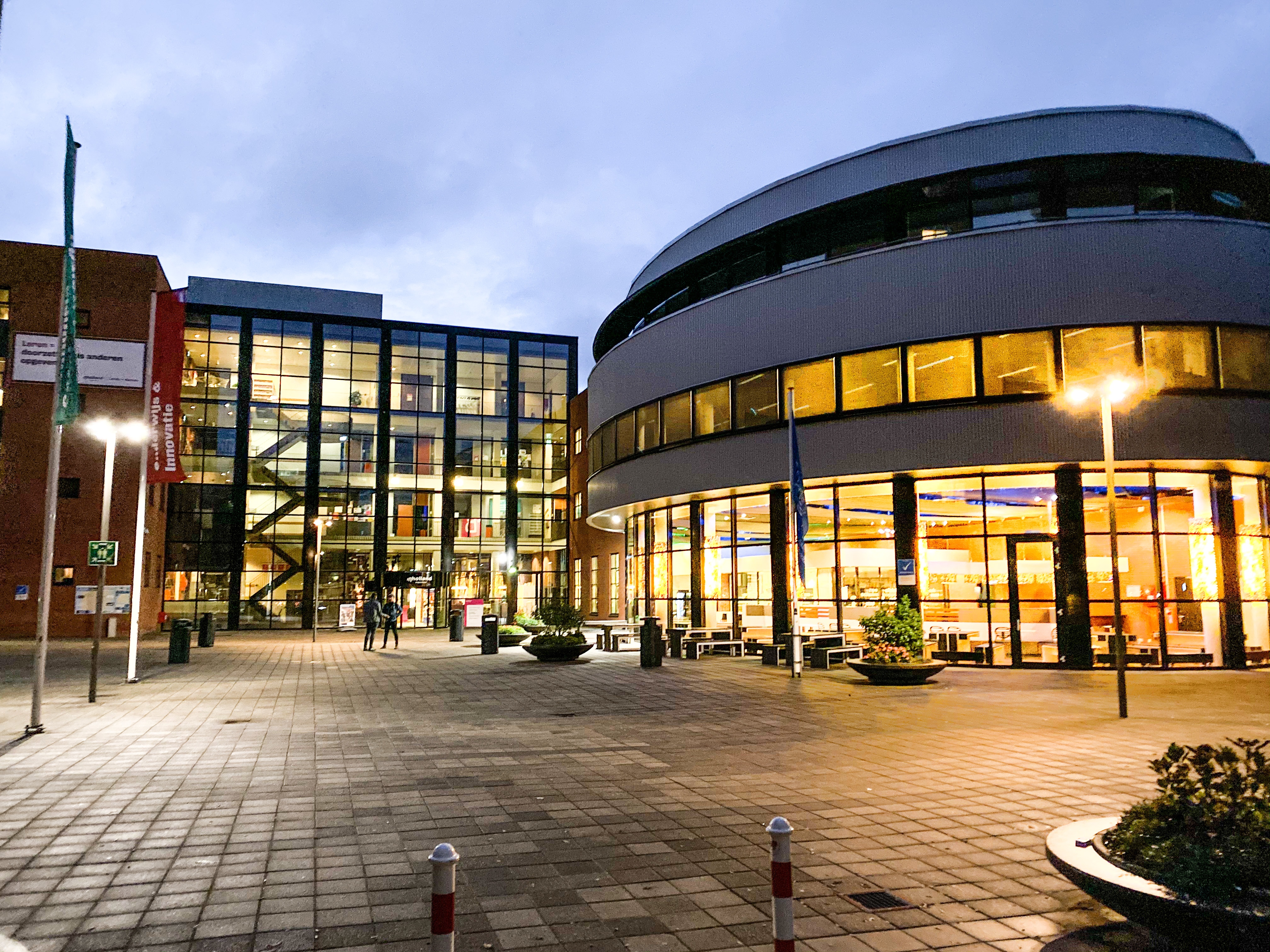
Inholland The Hague Campus

2022 Amsterdam campus

The new building of Inholland in Amsterdam on the Zeeburgereiland is set to be presented in September 2022. The new construction of Inholland on Zeeburgereiland is the result of the fact that the location in Diemen has reached the end of its lifespan. But also because the municipality of Amsterdam has indicated that it would like to see Hogeschool Inholland operate in and from the city. The relocation gives the university of applied sciences a recognizable position in the city of Amsterdam and a good profile in the city and region. The study programs from Amsterdam and Diemen will soon come together at one location.

== Organization and activities ==
Working in the pattern of applied sciences, Inholland University of Applied Sciences has several in-house learning companies where students conduct projects within a particular industry, often on behalf of a company, institution or governmental agency. For example, NEWb and Rookie Entertainment are student-run companies for our music and media students. Here they learn how to produce a radio or TV show, do market research, create a promotional campaign or organise an event. In Delft, Inholland Composites offers Aeronautical Engineering students an opportunity to gain practical and theoretical knowledge on advanced composite materials.

Bachelor's degrees at Inholland University of Applied Sciences demand three or four years of full-time study and require 240 European Credit Transfer and Accumulation System (ECTS) credits. One ECTS credit represents 28 hours of full-time study and the study/workload for one academic year accounts for 60 credits. The Accreditation Organisation of the Netherlands and Flanders (NVAO) approves study programs offered by Dutch universities. All international bachelor's programs offered by Inholland University of Applied Sciences are recognised by NVAO.

=== Internships ===
During their studies, all Inholland students are required to do at least one internship (one semester in the third academic year). Internships, or work placements, can be done in the Netherlands or abroad, and the choice upon the company is generally done by students themselves, but supervised and approved by the university. Specific requirements may vary according to the study programme.

During the internship students are supervised by one university lecturer or coach, and one company employee.

These internships are useful for building a professional network and gaining work experience directly on the field. Inholland is committed to protect its students during the work placements experience by monitoring its development and quality in rapport to the study career.

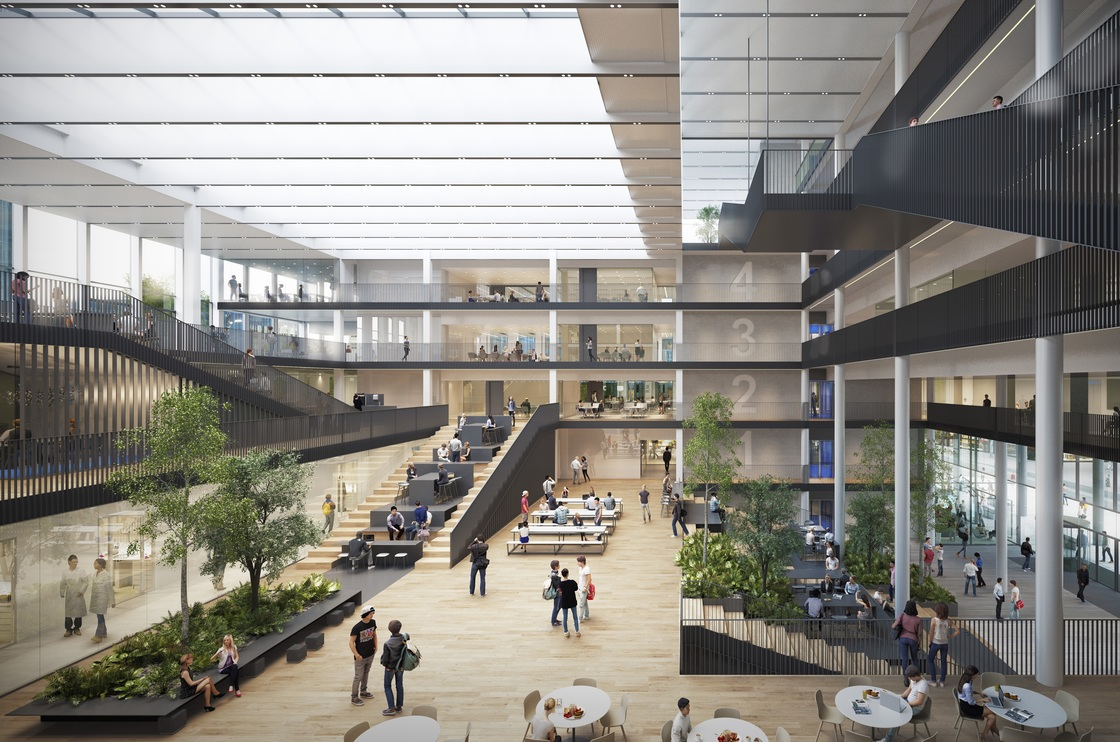
Inholland new Amsterdam campus

== Faculties ==
The degree programs of Inholland University of Applied Sciences are divided into faculties. There are 75 Bachelor's programs provided by Inholland. The international bachelor's programs come under the faculties of Creative Business and Engineering, Design and Computing. Inholland also offers associate degree (AD) programs, managed by Inholland Academy, and master's programs only in Dutch language.

Agri, Food & Life Sciences

Locations: Amsterdam and Delft

- Animal and Livestock Farming – Full-time Bachelor – Delft
- Food Commerce and Technology – Full-time Bachelor – Amsterdam, Delft
- Horticulture & Agribusiness – Full-time Bachelor – Delft
- Horticulture & Agribusiness – Part-time Bachelor – Delft
- Landscape and Environment Management – Full-time Bachelor – Delft
- Biology and Medical Laboratory Research – Full-time Bachelor – Amsterdam
- Biotechnology – Full-time Bachelor – Amsterdam
- Chemistry – Full-time Bachelor – Amsterdam

Business, Finance & Law

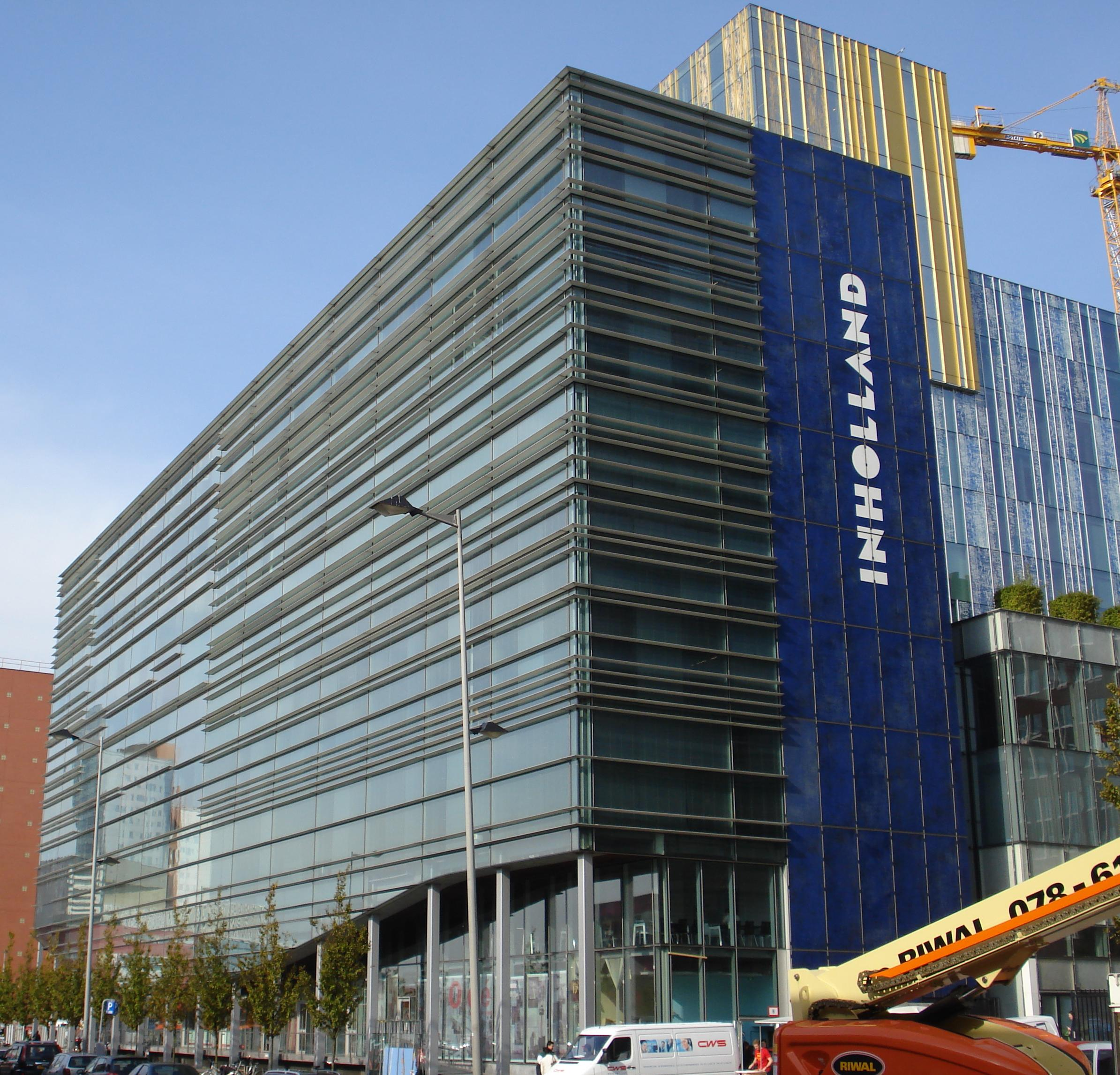
Inholland Campus Rotterdam

Locations: Alkmaar, Diemen, The Hague, Haarlem and Rotterdam

- Accountancy – Full-time Bachelor – Alkmaar, Diemen, Rotterdam
- Business Studies – Full-time Bachelor – Alkmaar, The Hague, Diemen, Haarlem, Rotterdam
- Finance & Control: Business Economics – Full-time Bachelor – Alkmaar, Diemen, Haarlem, Rotterdam
- Integral Safety Science – Full-time Bachelor – Rotterdam
- Integral Safety Science – Part-time Bachelor – Rotterdam
- Law studies – Full-time Bachelor – Rotterdam
- Law studies – Part-time Bachelor – Rotterdam
- Social Legal Services – Full-time Bachelor – The Hague, Rotterdam
- Social Legal Services – Part-time Bachelor – The Hague, Rotterdam

Creative Business

Locations: Alkmaar, Diemen, The Hague, Haarlem and Rotterdam

- Business Innovation (EN) – Full-time Bachelor – Amsterdam/Diemen
- Communication – Full-time Bachelor – The Hague, Diemen, Rotterdam
- Creative Business – Full-time Bachelor – The Hague, Haarlem, Rotterdam
- Facility management – Full-time Bachelor – Diemen
- International Creative Business (EN) – Full-time Bachelor – The Hague, Haarlem
- Leisure & Events Management – Full-time Bachelor – Diemen
- Music – Full-time Bachelor – Haarlem
- Tourism Management (EN) – Full-time Bachelor – Amsterdam/Diemen
- Tourism Management – Full-time Bachelor – Diemen, Haarlem, Rotterdam

Health, Sport and Welfare

Locations: Alkmaar, Amsterdam, The Hague, Haarlem and Rotterdam

- Medical Imaging and Radiotherapeutic Techniques – Dual Bachelor – Haarlem
- Medical Imaging and Radiotherapeutic Techniques – Full-time Bachelor – Haarlem
- Nurse – Dual Bachelor – Alkmaar, Amsterdam
- Nurse – Full-time Bachelor – Alkmaar, Amsterdam
- Nurse – Full-time Bachelor – Alkmaar, Amsterdam
- Obstetrics – Full-time Bachelor – Amsterdam
- Oral health care – Full-time Bachelor – Amsterdam
- Pedagogy – Full-time Bachelor – Amsterdam
- Social Work – Full-time Bachelor – Alkmaar, Amsterdam, The Hague, Haarlem, Rotterdam
- Social Work – Part-time Bachelor – Alkmaar, Amsterdam, The Hague, Haarlem, Rotterdam
- Sports science – Full-time Bachelor – Haarlem

Education & Innovation

Locations: Alkmaar, The Hague, Haarlem, Rotterdam and Dordrecht

- Teacher Primary Digital (DigiPabo) – Part-time Bachelor – The Hague, Dordrecht
- Teacher primary education (Pabo) – Dual Bachelor – Alkmaar, The Hague, Dordrecht, Haarlem, Rotterdam
- Teacher primary education (Pabo) – Full-time Bachelor – Alkmaar, The Hague, Dordrecht, Haarlem, Rotterdam
- Teacher primary education (Pabo) – Part-time Bachelor – Alkmaar, The Hague, Haarlem

Engineering, Design and Computing

Locations: Alkmaar, Diemen, Delft and Haarlem

- Aeronautical Engineering – Full-time Bachelor – Delft
- Applied Mathematics – Full-time Bachelor – Amsterdam/Diemen
- Architecture – Full-time Bachelor – Alkmaar, Haarlem
- Aviation technology – Full-time Bachelor – Delft
- Business IT & Management – Full-time Bachelor – Alkmaar, Diemen
- Business IT & Management – Part-time Bachelor – Diemen
- Civil engineering – Full-time Bachelor – Alkmaar
- Construction Management & Real Estate / Spatial Development – Full-time Bachelor – Haarlem
- Electrical engineering – Full-time Bachelor – Alkmaar
- Electrical engineering – Part-time Bachelor – Alkmaar
- Informatics – Full-time Bachelor – Haarlem
- Information Technology – Full-time Bachelor – Haarlem
- Mechanical engineering – Full-time Bachelor – Alkmaar
- Mechanical engineering – Part-time Bachelor – Alkmaar
- Precision Engineering (main subject Aviation Technology) – Full-time Bachelor – Delft
- Technical Business – Full-time Bachelor – Alkmaar
- Technical Business – Part-time Bachelor – Alkmaar
- Technical Informatics – Full-time Bachelor – Alkmaar

International exchanges

Inholland University of Applied Sciences is an ambitious institute that focuses on internationalisation and the development of international and cross-cultural competencies for the future knowledge worker. For Inholland, international mobility is a tool in order to reach that goal. Currently Inholland is actively part of the Erasmus and exchange program. This allows students to obtain credits at Inholland that count towards their degree at their home institution. It is an excellent way to experience a different education system and to broaden students' international outlook.

With approximately 190 partner universities in Europe, and few others overseas (Australia, China, South Korea, Argentina, just to name a few), Inholland's students are given the opportunity of studying abroad for one semester in the third year, by maintaining the same tuition fees that in The Netherlands.

Alternatively, students can choose to stay at Inholland and take part in one of many academic minors offered by each study programme.

Each year more than 300 students and 60 teachers take part in the exchanges, and at the same time, Inholland's locations welcome over 200 students from partner universities around the world.

Partner universities differ based on faculty and course.
