= Propaedeutics =

Historic term for an introductory course

Propaedeutics or propedeutics (from Ancient Greek προπαίδευσις, propaídeusis 'preparatory education') is a historical term for an introductory course into an art or science. The word propedeutics comes from the Greek prefix pro 'earlier, rudimentary, in front of' and Greek paideutikós 'pertaining to teaching'. As implied by the etymology, propaedeutics may be defined more particularly as the knowledge necessary before, or for the learning of, a discipline, but not which is sufficient for proficiency.

In medicine, the terms "propedeutics"/"propedeutic" specifically refers to the preliminary collection of data about a patient by observation, palpation, temperature measurement, etc., without specialized diagnostic procedures.

The 1851 Encyclopaedia Americana writes that it is:

...a term used by the Germans to indicate the knowledge which is necessary or useful for understanding or practising an art or science, or which unfolds its nature and extent, and the method of learning it. It is applied, therefore, not only to special introductions to particular branches of study, but also to auxiliary sciences, logic, philology, etc., and the encyclopaedic views of particular branches of science which facilitate an insight into the relations of the parts. Such a survey can be presented only by one who has studied a science in all its ramifications. The term propaedeutics is often, of course, merely relative : thus philology belongs to the propaedeutics of history, while it is itself the main study of a certain class of scholars. The term, however, in its common use, is generally restricted to the body of knowledge, and of rules necessary for the study of some particular science — rules which originate in the application of the general laws of science or art to a particular department.

Thus we find in the catalogues of lectures to be delivered in German universities medical propaedeutics, &c., enumerated.

== Netherlands ==
In the Netherlands, propedeuse (propaedeuse in older texts) is a propaedeutic diploma issued after the first year of studies, often referred to as "P" or "propjes" by students. Universities and universities of applied sciences are not forced by law to make use of this propaedeutic diploma, but it is quite common. The diploma is also a recognized degree in the Flemish educational system. It has remained in use after the introduction of the Bologna process and the international bachelor-master system in the Netherlands.

When in use at an educational institution, the propaedeutic diploma is a mandatory diploma which a student acquires by successfully completing all subjects (60 credits) and study requirements of the first year. This first year is therefore also known as the propedeuse or the propedeutische fase (literally, "propaedeutical phase"). Some study programs require the student to score sufficient on an additional examination.

=== History ===
The propaedeutic diploma was introduced as a means to determine whether students were suited for studying in the direction of their choice. and traditionally signifies that a student is officially accepted at a university. To symbolize this, schools may choose to organize an annual formal event where the propaedeutic diploma is awarded, mostly in early October, although this tradition is on a decline for financial reasons.

Educational reforms in 1982 emphasized the orientational, selecting and referring function. The difference between hogescholen(university of applied sciences) and universities was diminished so that the propedeutische fase became a commonly used name for the first year in all tertiary education. It became possible to enroll at university with a hogeschool propaedeutic diploma. This method is often used by students who did not obtain the required secondary education. University students can also enroll at a different university or hogeschool for the same or a similar study program.

At the end of the first year, an educational institution is obligated to issue advice on a student's suitability, whether the institution awards the propaedeutic diploma or not. In the vast majority of cases, this will be positive advice. The two possible consequences of not obtaining the propaedeutic diploma in one year are a negatief advies (literally, negative advice) which implies that the university or hogeschool recommends the student to enroll in a different study program, and a bindend negatief advies (literally, "binding negative advice") which prohibits the student from continuing or re-enrolling for the same study program at the institution. Furthermore, most hogescholen (university of applied sciences) have included in their statutes that should a student fail to meet the requirements for the propaedeutic diploma within a set period of time, usually set at two years, the student cannot continue to obtain a bachelor's degree.

=== Education level ===
An intermediate qualification according to UNESCO, classified at ISCED-A 550 (level 6 phase programme) / EQF 5.

=== Analogies ===
In the UK, the Certificate of Higher Education is roughly equivalent to the propaedeutic diploma, being earned after the first year of the three-year course of study culminating in a baccalaureate degree.

In the US, the equivalent of the propaedeutic diploma lies somewhere between an undergraduate certificate and an associate degree. Undergraduate certificates can be completed in as little as one semester (one-half of one academic year or about four months) and do not necessarily lead or contribute to any degree. Associate degrees (e.g. AA, AS) are typically earned after the first two years of the four- to five-year (in the US) course of study culminating in a baccalaureate degree; however, students matriculated in a bachelor's degree program are not usually awarded the associate degree en route (as is often the case when a doctoral student is awarded a master's degree en route). Additionally, there are first professional associate degrees (e.g. AAS, AGS) that do not necessarily lead or contribute to a bachelor's.

== See also ==
- Threshold knowledge
