= Concentration (Netherlands) =

Coalition of Dutch liberal parties, 1901–1918

The Concentration was a coalition of Dutch liberal parties between 1901 and 1918.

It was made up by the Vrijzinnig Democratische Bond, Liberale Unie and the Bond Vrije Liberalen.

The three parties were mainly united by the issue of universal suffrage and their opposition to equal financing for religious schools. The Concentration was opposed by the Coalition consisting of the Christian Historical Union, the Anti-Revolutionary Party and the Roman Catholic State Party.

The Concentration governed the Netherlands from 1905 to 1908 under Prime Minister Theo de Meester, with support from the social-democratic SDAP. It returned to power between 1913 and 1918 under Pieter Cort van der Linden who led an extra-parliamentary cabinet. In 1921, two of its constituent parties, the League of Free Liberals and the Liberal Union, merged to form the Liberal State Party, also known as the Freedom League.
