= Academic grading in the Netherlands =

Academic grading in the Netherlands has remained unchanged for several decades.

== Overview ==
In the Netherlands, most institutions grade exams, papers and thesis on a scale from 1 (very poor) to 10 (outstanding). The scale is generally further subdivided with intervals of one decimal place, although the use of halves (e.g., 7.5) and quarters (e.g., 7+ or 7−, rounded to 0.8 or 0.3) is also common. Thus, a 6.75 could be written as 7− and count as a 6.8, whereas a 7+ would be a 7.25 and count as a 7.3. Marks given in decimals are usually rounded to the nearest full mark for the final mark. At all levels of education, some subjects may be graded with the marks "insufficient" (O, or onvoldoende), "pass" (V, or voldoende) and in some cases "good" (G, or goed). On report cards, these are mostly shown as letters rather than numbers.

The grading scale with labels:

- 10 (Outstanding)
- 9 (Very good)
- 8 (Good)
- 7 (More than satisfactory)
- 6 (Satisfactory)
- 5 (Almost satisfactory)
- 4 (Unsatisfactory)
- 3 (Very unsatisfactory)
- 2 (Poor)
- 1 (Very poor)

The lowest pass mark is decided upon by the educational institute. It is usually set at 5.5 as narrow pass, and 5.4 and below constitute a fail. If no decimal places are used, 6 and up is a pass and 5 and below a fail. Sometimes, when no decimal place is used, an additional grade, 6−, is used to indicate that the student has "barely passed". In some cases, usually in high schools, fail marks may be compensated with high passes, provided the average mark is a pass. For example, a mark 4 and 9 would average at ((4 + 9) / 2) = 6.5 which makes for a pass. Compensation of marks is not always allowed in the course specifications, or a lower limit may be set (e.g., a mark below 4 may not be compensatable).

The mark 9 is seldom awarded (in only 2.7% of cases), and the highest pass mark 10 is extremely rare (in only 0.1% of cases) as this implies perfection, which is hardly ever present in student work, or indeed the lecturer's own work. Therefore, an average grade of an 8 is considered "excellent". Depending on the grade, universities can grant some honors, although this system is very limited compared to some other countries. Most universities offer the distinction "cum laude", which on average only offered to a few percent of students, although the exact requirements vary. It is generally comparable to the magna/summa cum laude distinction in North America. In general, a degree is awarded "cum laude" if the average of grades is at least 8 or 8.5, and no individual grade under 6 or 7 has been awarded. In most cases, the final thesis needs to be awarded at least an 8 or 8.5. For an average grade better than 7, but not meeting the criteria for cum laude, met genoegen ("with distinction") is sometimes awarded.

If the grade is based on points, the grade is generally calculated using the formula grade=1+score÷maximum score×9, so the lowest possible grade is 1.

== Grading systems compared ==
Converting the numbers of the Dutch grading system into the letters of systems such as those used in the United States and Great Britain, is difficult, especially given the fact that the Dutch grading system is linear rather than curved. It can really only be done if one can compare the frequency distribution of grades in the two systems. It should also be borne in mind that Dutch secondary education is banded at an early age. The university-preparatory vwo education is attended by only the most able 15% of candidates. This becomes relevant in comparing fractions of students attaining various grades with other systems where a higher or lower number of candidates are assessed at the level concerned, as selection effects influence this comparison. Moreover, the equivalence of university preparatory education the world over should not be assumed, as the American high school level or (barely) passing British and commonwealth A-levels with a D mark are inadequate for admission to Dutch research universities, as they do not equate the vwo and are organised completely differently. Applied to the Dutch system, the majority of pupils would most likely be sent through the havo system either doing A-levels and scoring relatively modest grades, or taking a more vocational path via the GNVQ system that introduces a less academic tone already at age 16. The havo only provides access to universities of professional education, while the vwo is required for admission to research universities. A thorough exploration of other systems is not warranted here, but care must be taken not to assume too much in the equivalences of qualifications that play different roles, in different systems, in the context of different traditions.

As the incidence of a 9 or 10 in havo examinations is considerably lower than that of the top marks in the American or British grading system, it would be a mistake to equate a 10 to an A, a 9 to a B, and so forth. If the 8, 9 and 10 are taken together, as in the list shown above, they represent the top S to 15% of examination results. If, in a grading system based on letters, the A represents the top 10% or thereabouts, grade A may be regarded as equivalent to grades 8 and above. A mark 7 is a decent grade, implying the student has satisfactory command of the subject matter but is not exceptionally good either. It is a fairly frequent mark. As such it relates to the mark B in many systems with an A-E scale: UK A-Level, Norway Higher Ed, but it could be considered a B+ under systems with a very broad B category (US). As an average final grade point of 6 constitutes the unconditional passing grade, in most cases is the standard for admission to a higher cycle of education, and has a high occurrence among pupils, there are good grounds for equating a 6 with a C in most systems and B− on the US scale, which has a similar frequency and purpose.

The conversion of the lowest passing grade may present another problem. A grade of 4 is a clear "fail", which may be compensated as described above. A mark 5, on the other hand, is "almost satisfactory" and may be about that of the D in many systems, which counts as a weak pass, but as an average is too low for admission into a higher cycle of education. This however depends on the level of training the grade is compared to, as a D would not constitute a passing level at vwo level but may reach equivalence for the havo level when the differences between philosophies and methods are being taken into account. There is also some ambiguity in the interpretation of the 5 mark in the Dutch educational system. For purposes of assessing a pupil's progress throughout the year, a 5 is usually considered to be good enough, provided the pupil does better on following tests. For final examinations, a 5 is unacceptable as an average, but in high schools one mark 5 is condoned for one profile subject (except for maths in some cases) and one subject in either the compulsory or free choice segment. In higher education, most courses require a minimum average of 6 on all subjects. Moreover, in the Dutch system resits of examinations are more common, allowing pupils who did not attain a sufficient grade to redeem it one or several times, whereas in other systems candidates may be sent away sooner. Furthermore, Dutch pupils are more likely to return and retry applying for the desired level of vocational education, while British candidates would continue at a lower level instead.

== See also ==
- Education in the Netherlands
