= Pacification of 1917 =

Political agreement in the Netherlands

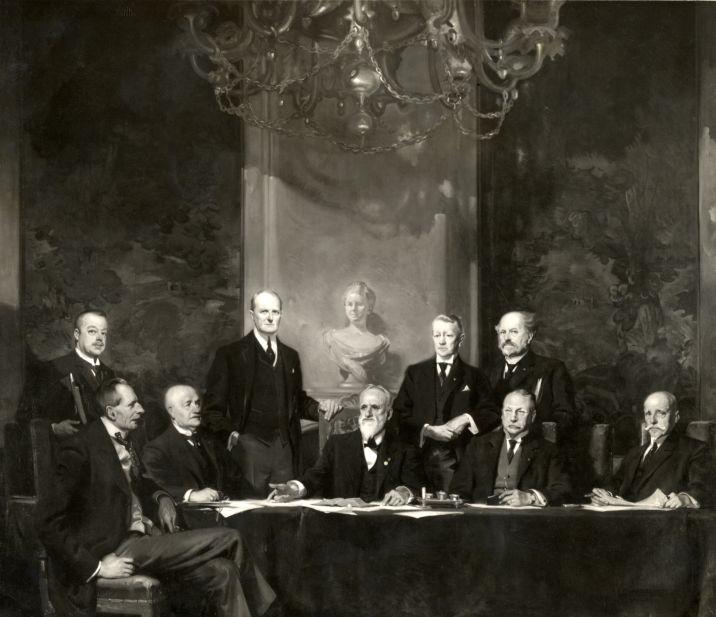
The Cort van der Linden cabinet.

The Pacification of 1917 was a political agreement between liberals and socialists on the left and some Christian parties on the right in the Netherlands, ending both the suffrage issue and the school struggle. The Christian parties involved would later present themselves as "Christian-democrats".

== Process and agreement ==
The suffrage issue and the school struggle were issues that had dominated Dutch politics in the previous decades. When the liberal Cort van der Linden cabinet took office in 1913, it vowed to resolve both issues. A state committee tasked with finding a resolution to the suffrage issue was instituted on 15 November 1913. Although led by the liberal professor Jacques Oppenheim, it included members from all parliamentary parties and movements of the time, seeking a compromise that could rely on broad support. A second state committee for the school struggle was instituted on 31 December. It was led by the progressive liberal member of the House of Representatives Dirk Bos, but had a composition much like the first.

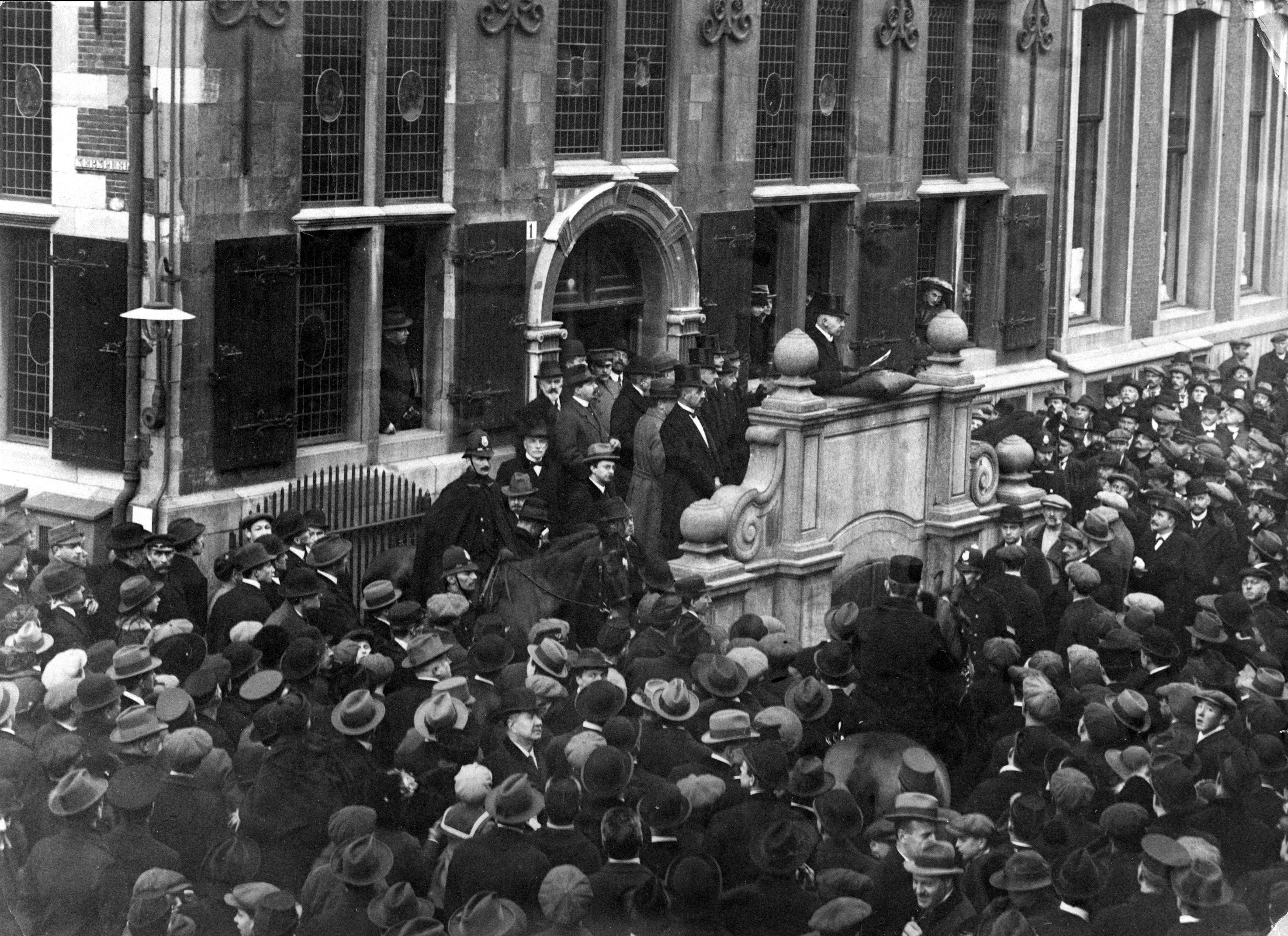
Proclamation of the revision of the constitution from the steps of the town hall in The Hague, December 12, 1917.

The committees quickly agreed that the two issues should be treated as a compromise. The Opperheim Committee handed its report to the cabinet in 1914, while the Bos Committee finished in 1916. The Christian democratic parties would be given a constitutional right to equal funding for religious schools, for which they had pleaded since the early 19th century. In return, the Christian democrats vowed to support universal male suffrage, which had long been a wish of the liberal parties and the Social Democratic Workers' Party. Although suffrage would not be extended to women as part of the compromise, the sex requirement would be taken out of the Constitution, thus allowing a parliamentary majority to introduce it afterwards. Additionally, the majoritarian two-round system would be replaced by party-list proportional representation using one nation-wide district, and compulsory voting was introduced.

Since constitutional amendment required a majority in two successive parliaments, including a two-thirds majority in the second, a snap election was called in 1917. The major parties, all of which had agreed to the terms of the Pacification, did not field candidates against incumbent opponents in order to assure that the elected parliament would show the same level of support as the retiring one. Fifty incumbents stood unopposed, while another fifty were re-elected. Candidates challenging incumbents were mostly associated with the Anti-Constitution Committee, which opposed the prospective constitutional amendments, as well as members of the Peasants' League and the Christian Social Party. The newly elected House of Representatives, identical in composition to its predecessor, voted overwhelmingly in favour of the constitutional amendments on 25 September 1917; only two members voted against the education amendment. The Senate followed on 29 November, with only one Senator voting against all amendments.

== Consequences ==
After having passed the amendments, parliament was immediately dissolved again, leading to the first election in organised in accordance with the new Constitution in 1918. The Social Democratic Workers' Party grew substantially, but the Christian democratic parties dominated the election, collectively winning a majority of the seats. The liberal parties were the losers of the extension of suffrage; the two conservative-liberal parties fell from 31 seats to only 10. Although women did not yet enjoy active suffrage (the right to vote), they did now have passive suffrage (the right to be voted for), leading to the election of the first female member of the House of Representatives, the Social Democrat Suze Groeneweg. Active female suffrage was approved by parliament in 1919.

Although the suffrage issue and the school struggle were now resolved, the Pacification did nothing to address the social question, which would subsequently become the dominant issue in Dutch politics. As a result, the terms left and right became less based on the religious/secular cleavage as it had been under the antithesis, and more based on the economic cleavage, with social democrats on the left, Christian democrats in the centre and liberals on the right. The end of the school struggle and the restructuring of the political spectrum paved the way for cooperation between Christian democrats and liberals, as would happen in the second Colijn cabinet. Another consequence of the Pacification was the development of consociationalism, manifesting itself as pillarisation, whereby Dutch politics and society were sharply divided into four "pillars" (Protestant, Catholic, liberal and socialist), each of which had a full set of its own social organisations, including churches (for the religious pillars), political parties, schools, universities, labour unions, sport clubs, youth clubs and newspapers.

== See also ==
- Constitution of the Netherlands
- Arend Lijphart
