= Jenaplan schools =

Teaching concept

Jenaplan (or Jena Plan) schools are based on a teaching concept conceived and founded by the German pedagogue Peter Petersen from 1923-1927. The term Jenaplan was coined by the London committee for preparing the 4th meeting of the New Education Fellowship in Locarno in 1927. Petersen developed his concept at the University of Jena (hence the term), where he was the head of the Department of Education since 1923.

The basic ideas are independent learning by doing, cooperation and communal life, shared responsibility by school children and parents. The basic forms of education according to the Jenaplan approach are:

- Teaching: (interdisciplinary) core teaching, free work (free choice of discipline), course teaching (in special disciplines)
- Party and celebrations: morning circle, week closure celebrations, birthday parties, enrollment and others
- Discussions: round-tables, reports, talks, clarifying debates etc.
- Play (free play, learning games, pause games, gymnastics games, theatre play): this supports the development of younger children, teaches rules for social behaviour, promotes attention

The Jenaplan schools operate according to 20 basic principles, e.g.:

- Each human being is unique. Therefore, each child and each adult has an irreplaceable value and a special dignity.
- Each human being has the right to develop their own identity, irrespective of ethnic origin, nationality, social environment, religion, philosophy or abilities/disabilities.
- Every person is always recognized in their entirety. They are encountered and treated in this way, wherever possible.
- People should work for a society that respects the irreplaceable value and the dignity of every individual human being.
- People should work for a society that offers the opportunity and incentives for developing the identity of each person.

== Schools ==
Jenaplan schools in Germany are, among others:

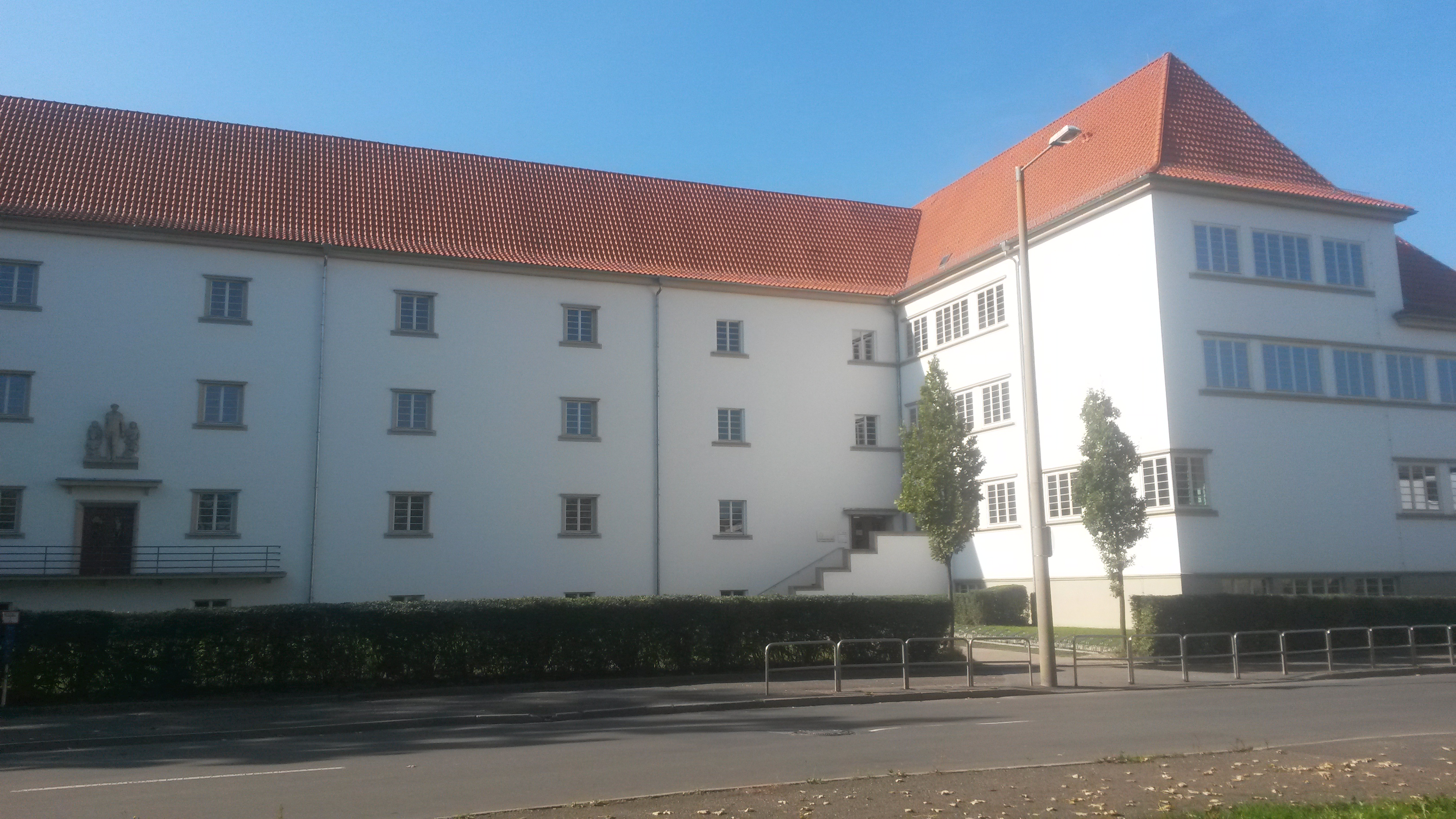
Jenaplan-Schule in Jena

- Jenaplan-Schule in Jena
- Kaleidoskop Jena - Jenaplanschule in Jena (district Lobeda)
- Evangelische Schule St. Marien in Neubrandenburg
- Freie Comenius Schule in Darmstadt
- Freie Schule LernZeitRäume in Dossenheim (near Heidelberg)
- Jenaplanschule in Rostock
- Jenaplanschule in Hungen
- Jenaplan-Schule in Nürnberg
- Jenaplan-Gymnasium in Nürnberg
- Jenaplan-Schule in Weimar
- Laborschule in Dresden
- Lauterschule in Suhl

Jenaplan schools in the Netherlands are, among a total of 190 Jenaplan schools:

- Jenaplan OSG Sevenwolden in Heerenveen, Friesland
- Jenaplanschool 't Wilde Woud in Haren, Groningen
- Jenaplanschool 't Vlot in Hoogezand, Groningen
- O.B.S. De Woldstroom in Meppel, Drenthe
- JenaXL in Zwolle, Overijssel
- O.J.S. Het Palet in Hardenberg, Overijssel
- Jenaplanschool Pierson in Hengelo, Gelderland
- De Zonnewijzer in Heerhugowaard, Noord Holland
- Jenaplan School De Kring in Oegstgeest, Zuid Holland

Other Jenaplan schools are located in Belgium, Austria, South Tyrol (Italy), and Japan.
