= School struggle (Netherlands) =

The school struggle (Dutch: de schoolstrijd) is a historical conflict in the Netherlands between 1848 and 1917 over the equalization of public financing for religious schools.

== French period ==
The struggle began during the French occupation of the Low countries. In 1795 the French introduced the separation of church and state. Due to this, education became a matter of the state. Prior to this, the Dutch Reformed Church had most power over education for centuries. The French did not forbid Christian schools, but they needed permission of the government, which was not given in all cases. Funding of Christian schools was out of the question. Religion was not completely banned from education, however.

== 19th century up to 1848 ==
In the law on schools (schoolwet) of 1806 it was stated that public schools should educate for all Christian and civil virtues. Many Protestants thought this basis not sufficient. Especially the later Anti-Revolutionary politicians Guillaume Groen van Prinsterer and Abraham Kuyper wanted more religion in education and wanted special schools apart from the public schools.

Following the Protestants, the Catholics also came into the struggle. In 1840 they handed a list of complaints to King William I, showing the backlog of the Catholics in the country. This list especially featured education.

Part of the solution came from the constitution of liberal politician Johan Rudolph Thorbecke in 1848, in which freedom of education was included. Thorbecke himself was in favor of public education, but he thought that anybody should be allowed to establish a school, if the teachers were of good quality.

== 1848 to 1919 ==
Missing in the constitution was a paragraph on funding of schools. In 1857 a law was introduced which made it more expensive to go to a school for children, caused by arrangements on salary of teachers, class size etc. Due to this, Jewish schools disappeared, but special Christian schools kept their position.

In 1878 again a new law was introduced by Kappeyne van de Coppello, which increased the cost of education even more. The non-public schools had to fund these additional costs themselves. As a consequence, the poorest Protestants and Catholics could not send their children to their preferred school. The revolts of the people resulted in a petition to King William III, in which they asked him not to sign the new law. The petition was signed by more than 300,000 persons of Protestant origin. An alternative petition of the Catholics received 100,000 signatures. The king, however, signed the law on 17 August of the same year.

The protest of the ordinary people was not heard sufficiently, because they had no suffrage. By voting within electoral associations on a candidate they could, however, influence the voting by the elite. These electoral associations became the precursors of the current political parties. The first party was the ARP. It was established on 3 April 1879, partly by the same people that had established some months earlier a "school with the Bible."

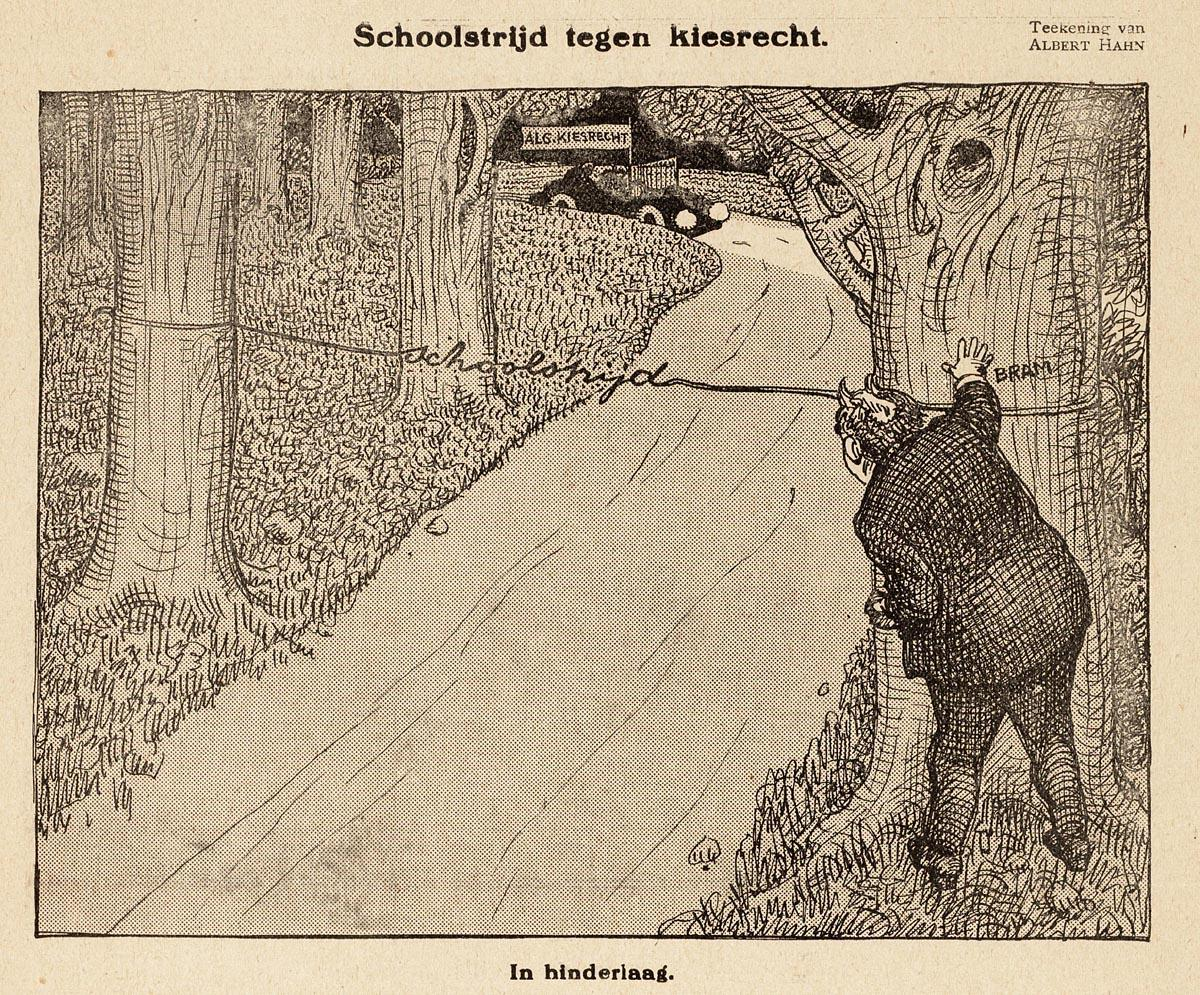
Cartoon by Albert Hahn, suffrage (in the car) versus School Struggle (the line across the road). The name Bram of the person at the tree stands for Abraham Kuyper

The Protestant and Catholic parties, the Anti-Revolutionary Party and Christian Historical Union and the General League of Roman Catholic Caucuses respectively, wanted their religious schools to receive financing equal to that received by public schools, while maintaining their freedom in, for example, curriculum policy and teacher appointments, that came with their religious tradition. Liberals and socialists tried to protect the privileged financial position of public schools and were much against public funding of religious schools. These parties had another political standpoint, which they thought more important than education: suffrage for all male citizens. They could not succeed to change the constitution in this manner, without support of a substantial part of the religious parties.

== End of conflict ==
The conflict lasted from 1801 to 1920, when it was resolved in the Pacification of 1917 which included male suffrage. Suffrage for females came two years later. The Dutch solution was the separation of school and state by funding all schools equally, both public and private, which is enshrined in article 23 of the Dutch constitution. After this, many special schools appeared in the country, not only religious, but on the basis of other ideas on education. The result of the school struggle has enhanced the so-called pillarisation of the Dutch society, with even separate public, Protestant (Vrije Universiteit) and Catholic universities (Katholieke Universiteit Nijmegen).
