= Zaanstad =

- Municipality
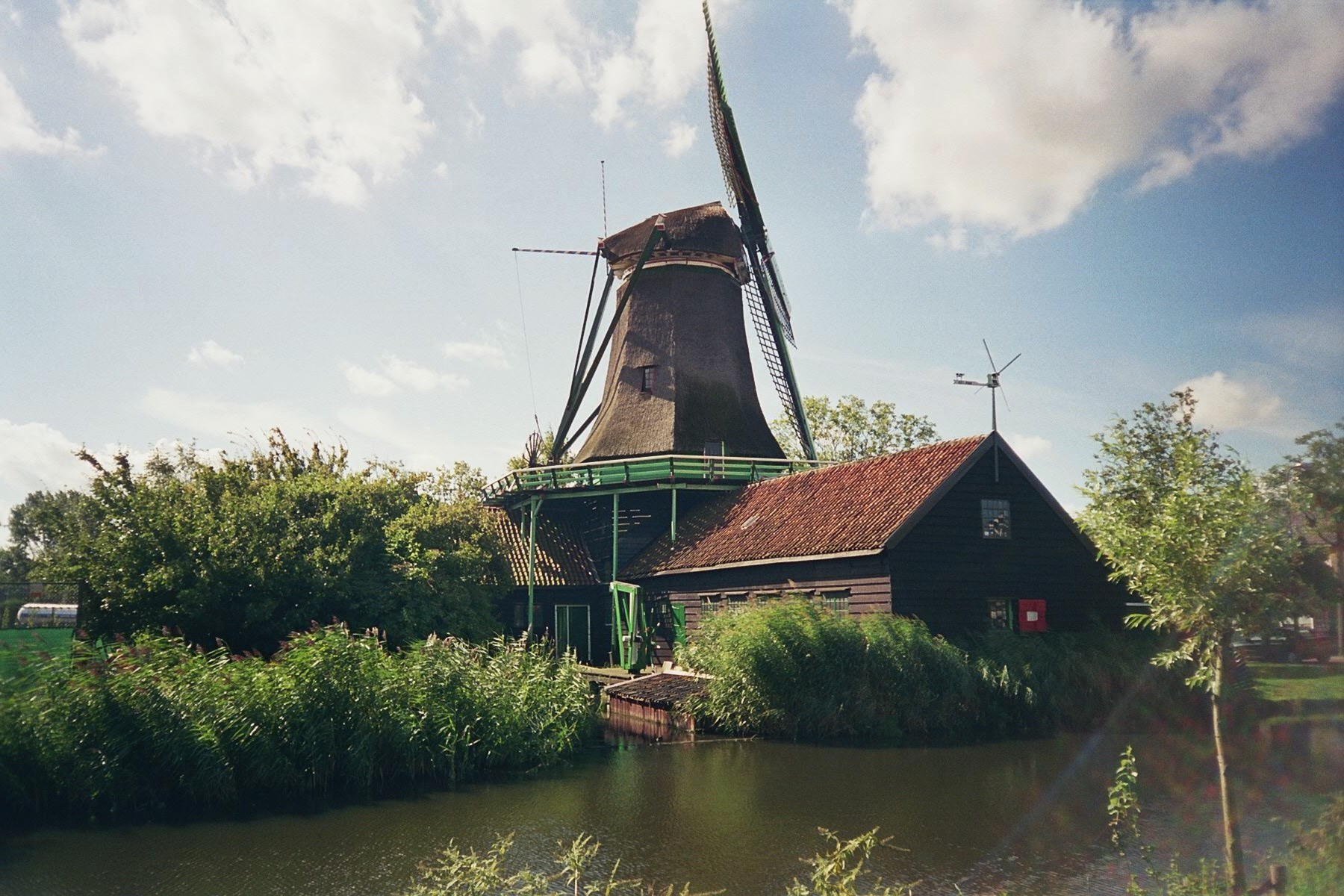
- Windmill Het Pink

- Flag Coat of arms

- Location in North Holland
- Interactive map of Zaanstad
- Location within the Netherlands Location within Europe
- Coordinates: 52°26′N 4°49′E
- Country: Netherlands
- Province: North Holland
- Region: Amsterdam metropolitan area
- Established: 1 January 1974

Government
  - Body: Municipal council
  - Mayor: Jan Hamming (PvdA)

Area
  - Total: 83.24 km^{2} (32.14 sq mi)
  - Land: 73.87 km^{2} (28.52 sq mi)
  - Water: 9.37 km^{2} (3.62 sq mi)
- Elevation: 1 m (3.3 ft)

Population (January 2021)
  - Total: 156,901
  - Density: 2,124/km^{2} (5,500/sq mi)
- Time zone: UTC+1 (CET)
  - Summer (DST): UTC+2 (CEST)
- Postcode: Parts of 1500 range
- Area code: 075
- Website: www.zaanstad.nl

Zaanstad (Dutch pronunciation: [ˈzaːnstɑt]) is a Dutch municipality in the province of North Holland, situated northwest of Amsterdam. Its main settlement is Zaandam. It is part of the conurbation and metropolitan area of Amsterdam. It had a population of 156,901 in 2021.

== Topography ==
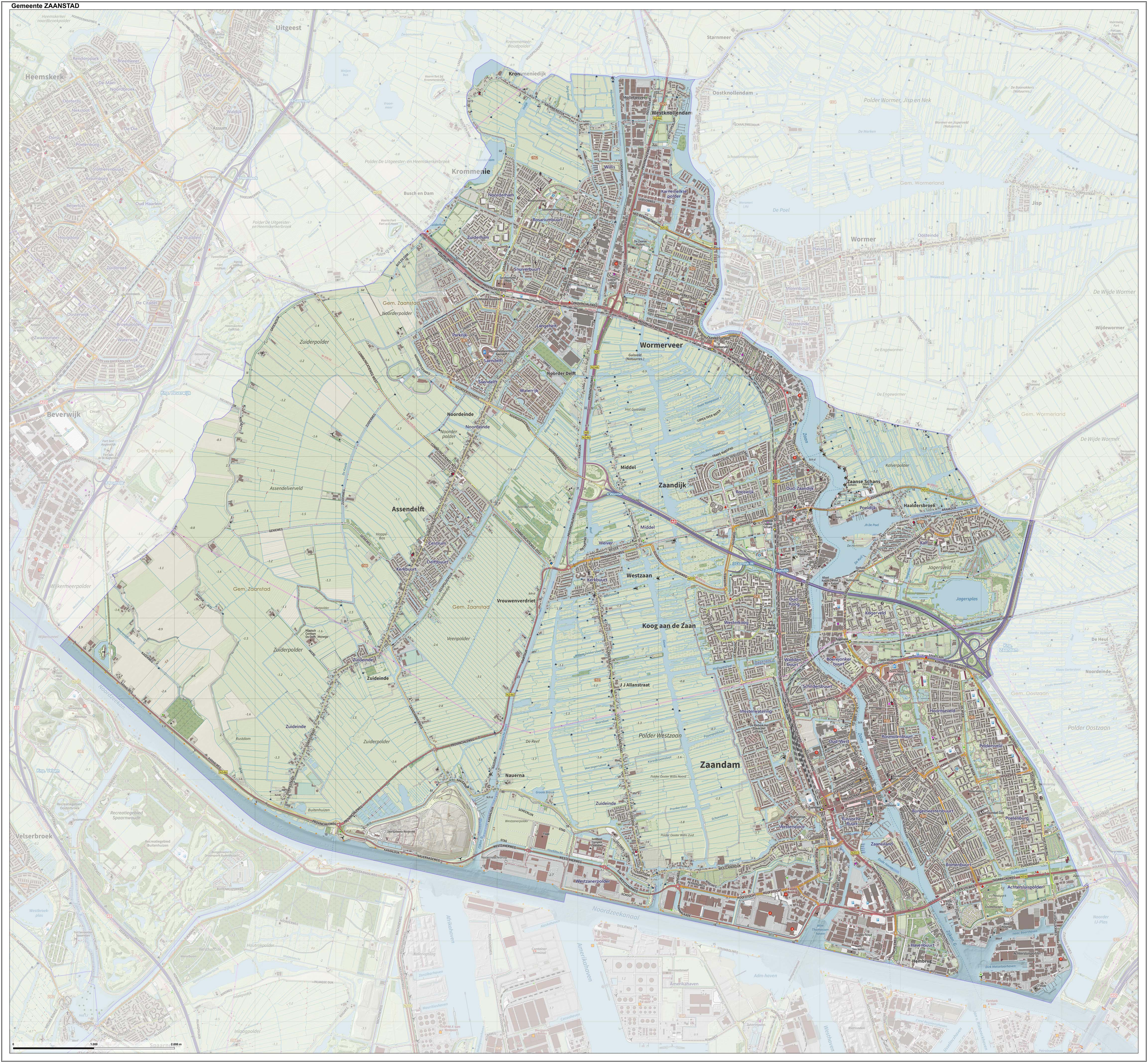
Map of Zaanstad, 2014

== Population centres ==
The municipality of Zaanstad is a conurbation consisting of the towns and villages of: Assendelft, Koog aan de Zaan, Krommenie, Westzaan, Wormerveer, Zaandam and Zaandijk. However, being surrounded by countryside and due to its relatively protracted shape that follows the river Zaan, a rural atmosphere is always nearby.

== Railway stations in Zaanstad ==
- Koog aan de Zaan railway station (formerly Koog Bloemwijk)
- Krommenie-Assendelft railway station
- Wormerveer railway station
- Zaandam railway station
- Zaandam Kogerveld railway station
- Zaandijk Zaanse Schans railway station (formerly Koog-Zaandijk)

== Local government ==
The municipal council of Zaanstad consists of 39 seats, which at the 2026 local elections divided as follows:

- Lokaal Zaans - 8
- PvdA/GroenLinks - 6
- POV - 4
- VVD - 3
- PVV- 3
- FvD- 3
- D66 - 3
- ROSA Zaanstad - 2
- DENK - 2
- Democratisch Zaanstad - 2
- PvdD - 1
- CDA - 1
- SP - 1

== Notable tourist attractions ==
- Zaans Museum
- Zaanse Schans
- Czar Peter House
- Gedempte Gracht, a shopping street in Zaandam

== Notable people from Zaanstad ==
=== The arts ===
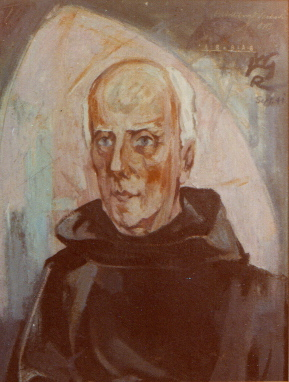
Jan Verkade, 1946

- Pieter Jansz. Saenredam (1597–c. 1665), a painter of the Dutch Golden Age
- Anton Mauve (1838–1888), realist painter, leading member of the Hague School
- Jan Verkade (1868-1946), post-Impressionist and Christian Symbolist painter
- Piet Zwart (1885–1977), graphic designer, industrial designer and typographer
- Dick Laan (1894–1973), children's writer and film pioneer
- Aafje Heynis (1924–2015), contralto
- Piet Kee (1927–2018), organist and composer
- Han Bennink (born 1942), jazz drummer and percussionist
- Kathinka Pasveer (born 1959), flautist

=== Public thinking & public service ===
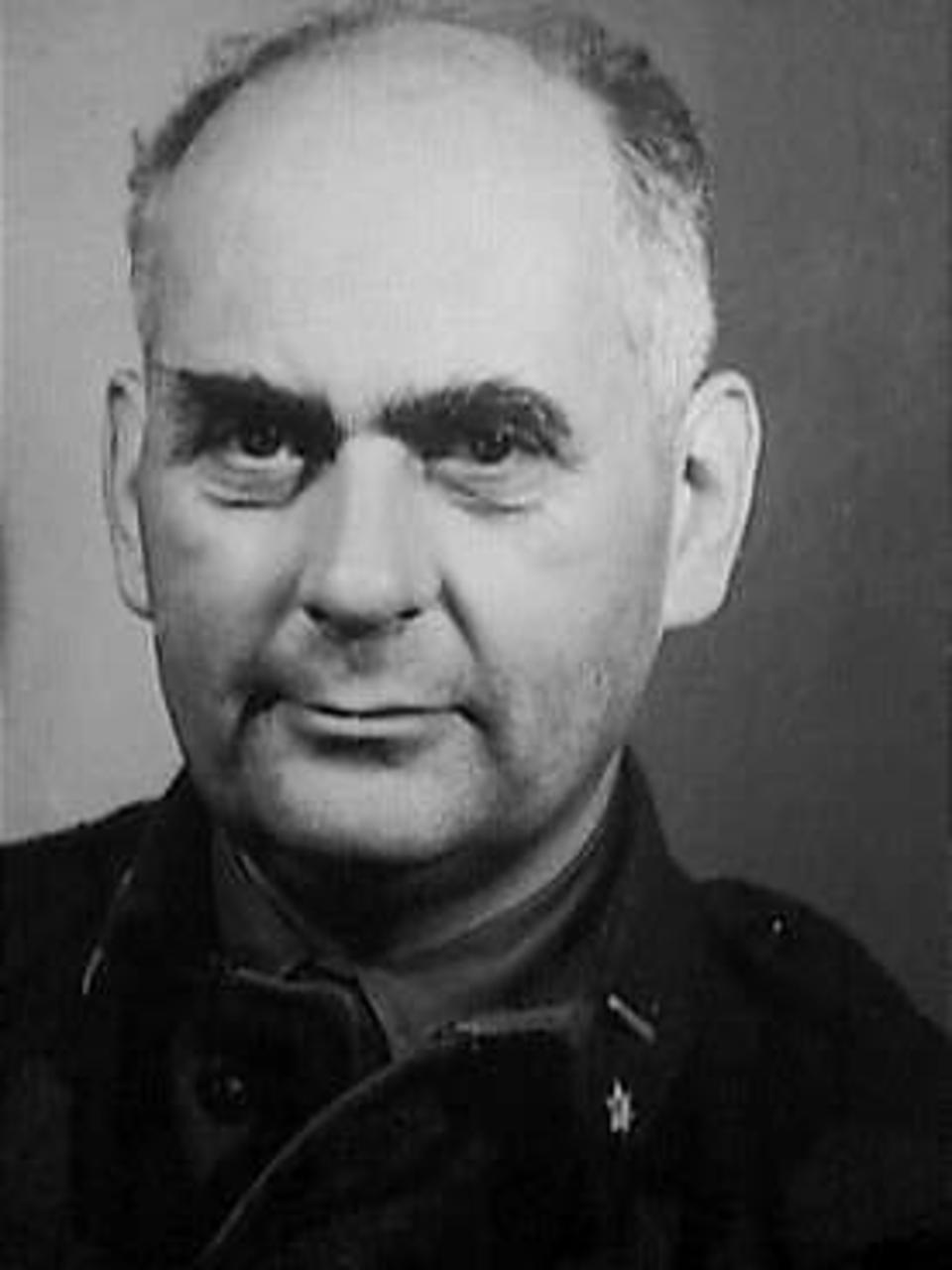
Adriaan Pelt, 1940s

- Adriaan Pelt (1892–1981), journalist, international civil servant and diplomat
- Johannes Kleiman (1896–1959), resident who helped hide Anne Frank and her family
- Hanneke Ippisch (1925–2012), member of the Dutch resistance in World War II
- Tom Viezee (born 1950), Christian minister and former politician, Mayor of Zeewolde 1999–2004
- Emine Bozkurt (born 1967), politician

=== Science & business ===
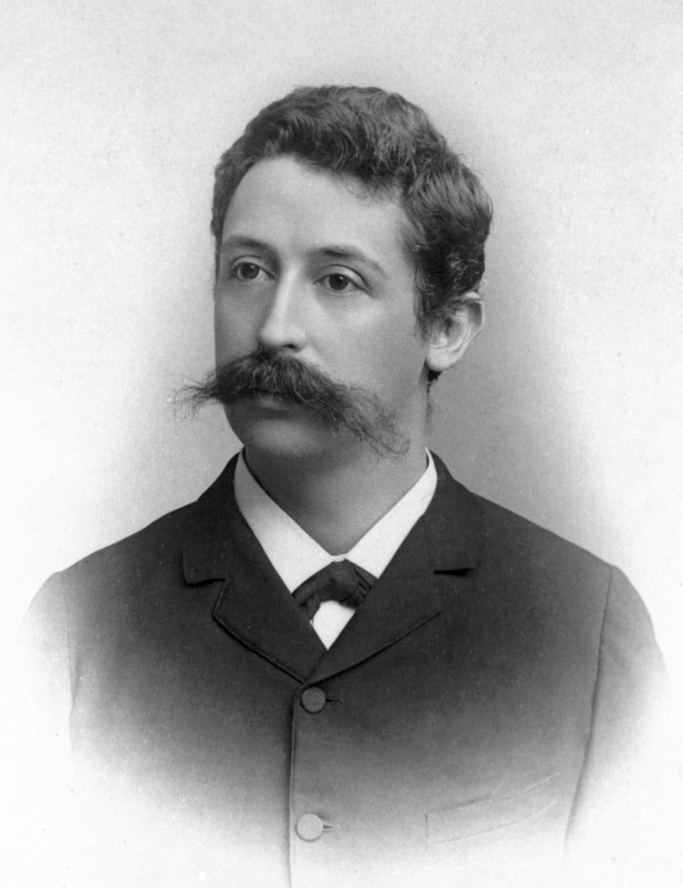
Christiaan Eijkman

- Pieter Bleeker (1819–1878), medical doctor, ichthyologist, and herpetologist
- Christiaan Eijkman (1858–1930), physician and professor of physiology, joint winner the Nobel Prize for Physiology or Medicine in 1929 for the discovery of vitamins
- Cornelis Zwikker (1900–1985), scientist, mostly in physics, chemistry and acoustics
- E. G. van de Stadt (1910–1999), yacht designer
- Simon de Wit (1912–1976), rower and CEO of the supermarket chain Simon de Wit
- Gerrit Jan Heijn (1931–1987), businessman with Ahold, kidnapped and murdered
- Floris Takens (1940–2010), mathematician

=== Sport ===
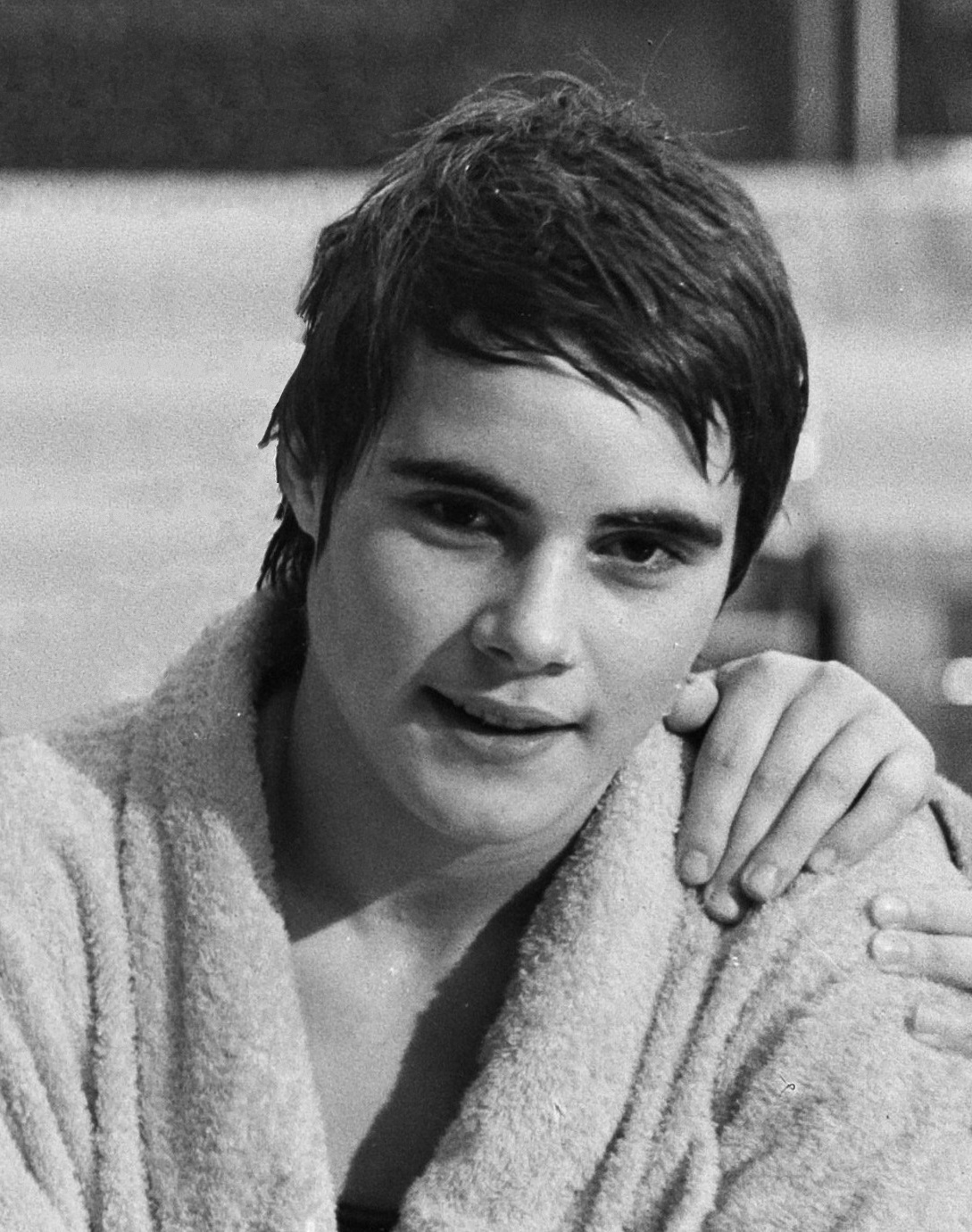
Toos Beumer, 1963

- Jaap Boot (1903-1986), athlete, bronze medallist in the 1924 Summer Olympics
- Jaap Kraaier (1913–2004), flatwater canoeist, bronze medallist at the 1936 Summer Olympics
- Nicolaas Tates (1915–1990), canoeist, bronze medallist at the 1936 Summer Olympics
- Mieke Jaapies (born 1943), sprint canoer, silver medallist in the 1972 Summer Olympics
- Cees Stam (born 1945), a former track cyclist and four-time world champion stayer
- Toos Beumer (born 1947), swimmer, team bronze medallist at the 1964 Summer Olympics
- Johnny Rep (born 1951), former footballer
- Annemarie Sanders (born 1958), an equestrian, silver medallist in the Team Dressage 1992 Summer Olympics
- Luc Nijholt (born 1961), football manager and a former player
- Erwin Koeman (born 1961), retired footballer
- Ronald Koeman (born 1963), retired footballer and ex-manager of the Barcelona since 2020.
- Wietse van Alten (born 1978), an archer, bronze medallist 2000 Summer Olympics
- Bilal Başaçıkoğlu (born 1995), footballer

== International relations ==
=== Twin towns – sister cities ===
Zaanstad is twinned with:

Marino, Italy	Pančevo, Serbia	Zwickau, Saxony, Germany

- Kaman , Türkiye

== Gallery ==
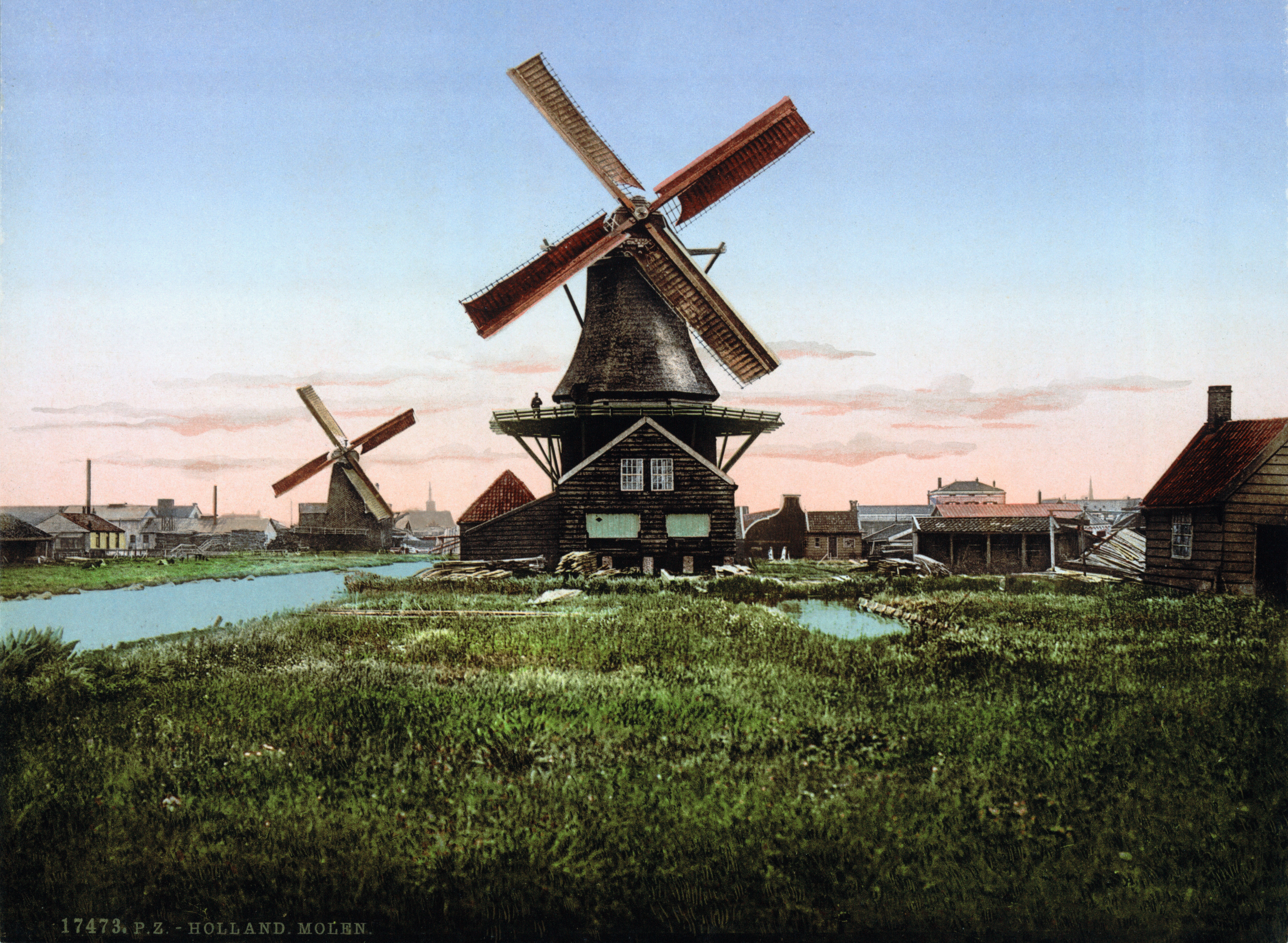
Zaanstad windmill at the beginning of the 20th century

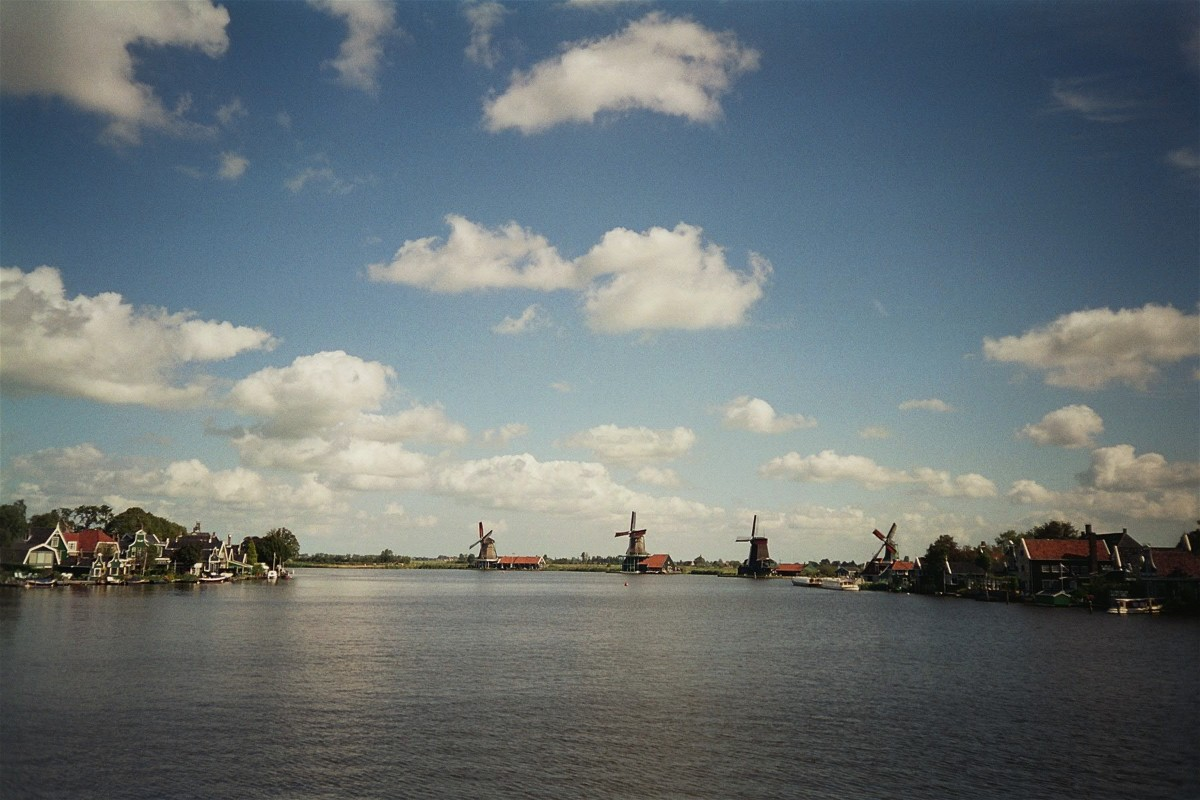
River Zaan

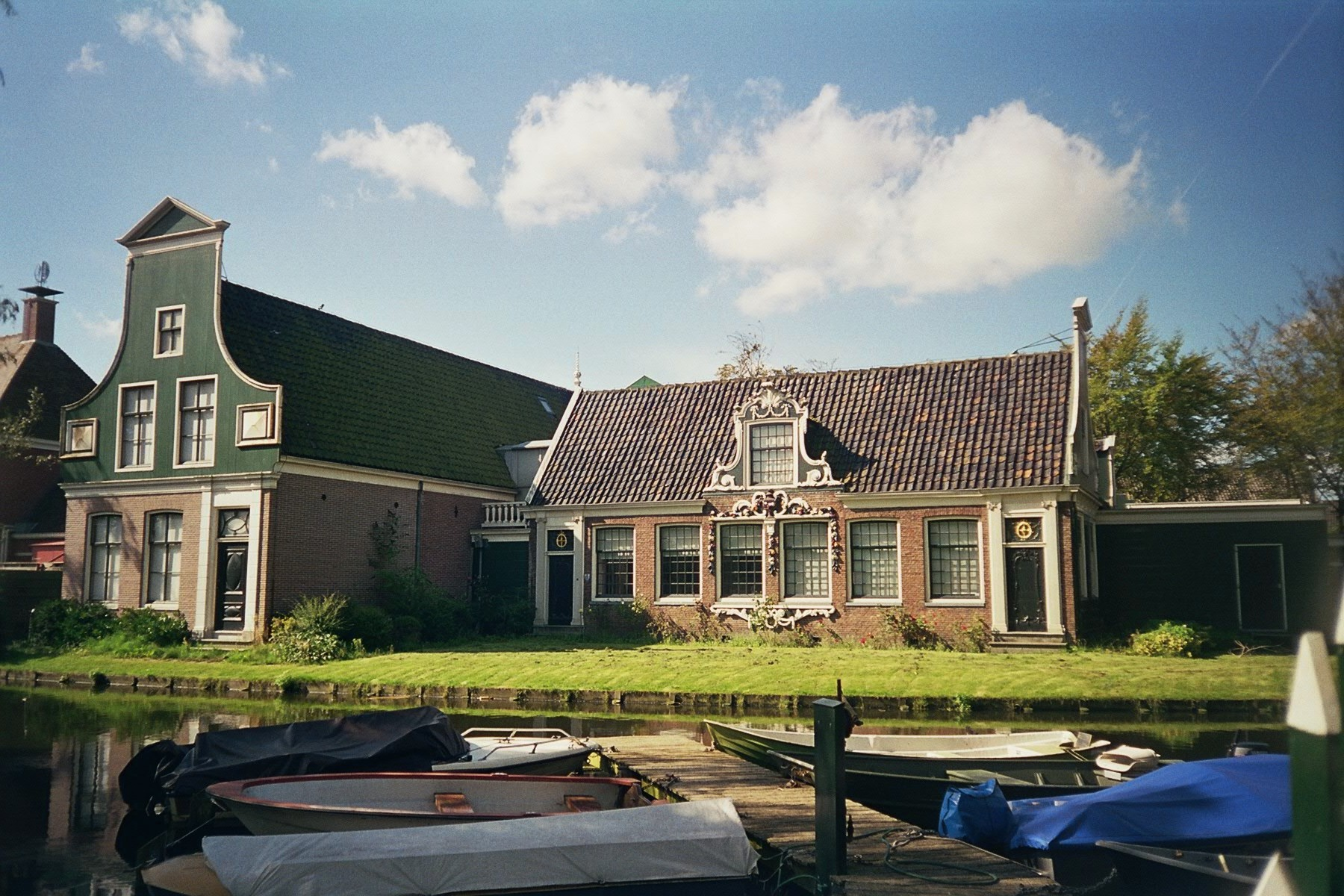
Windmill Museum, Zaanstad

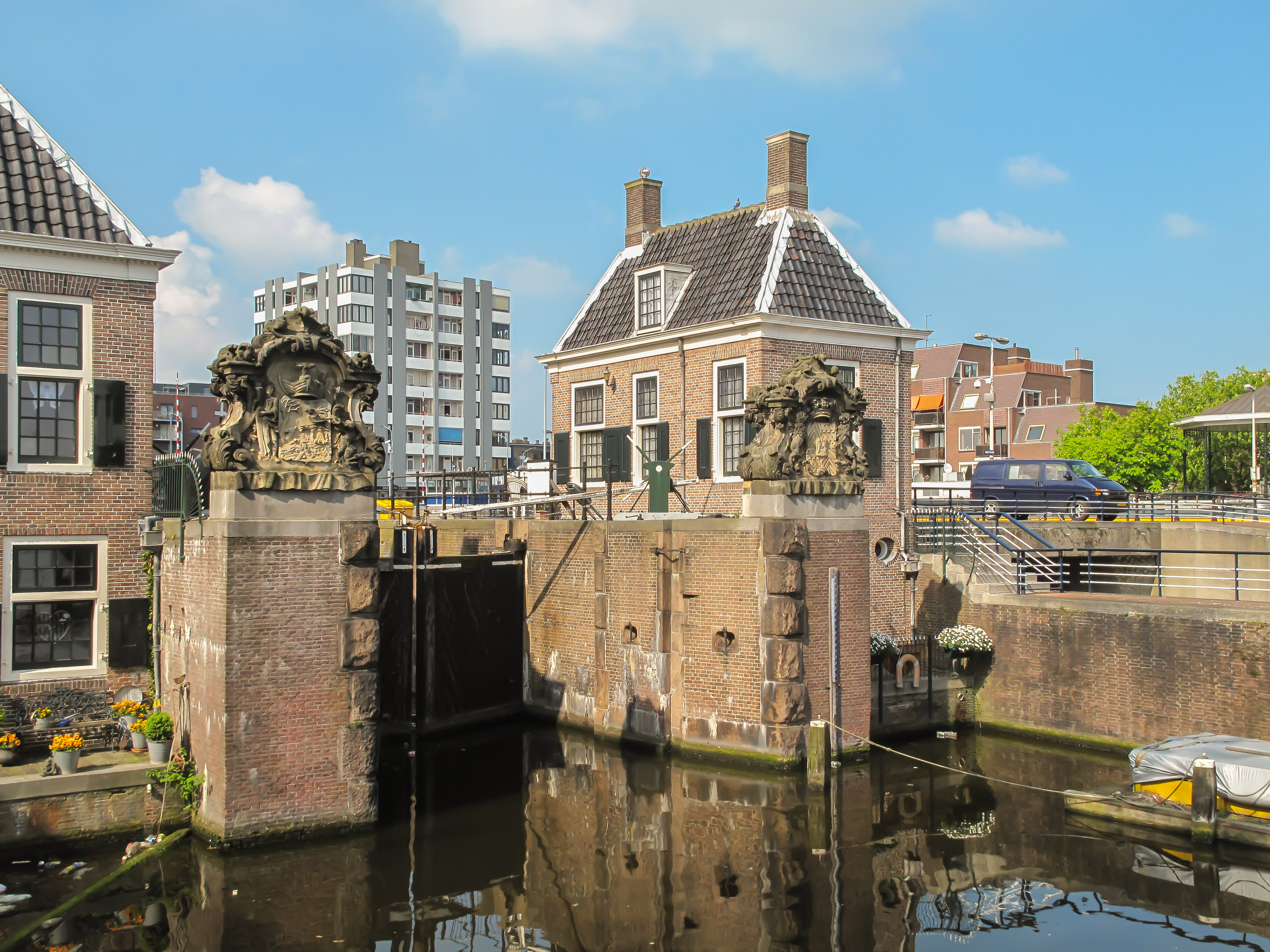
Zaandam, sluice

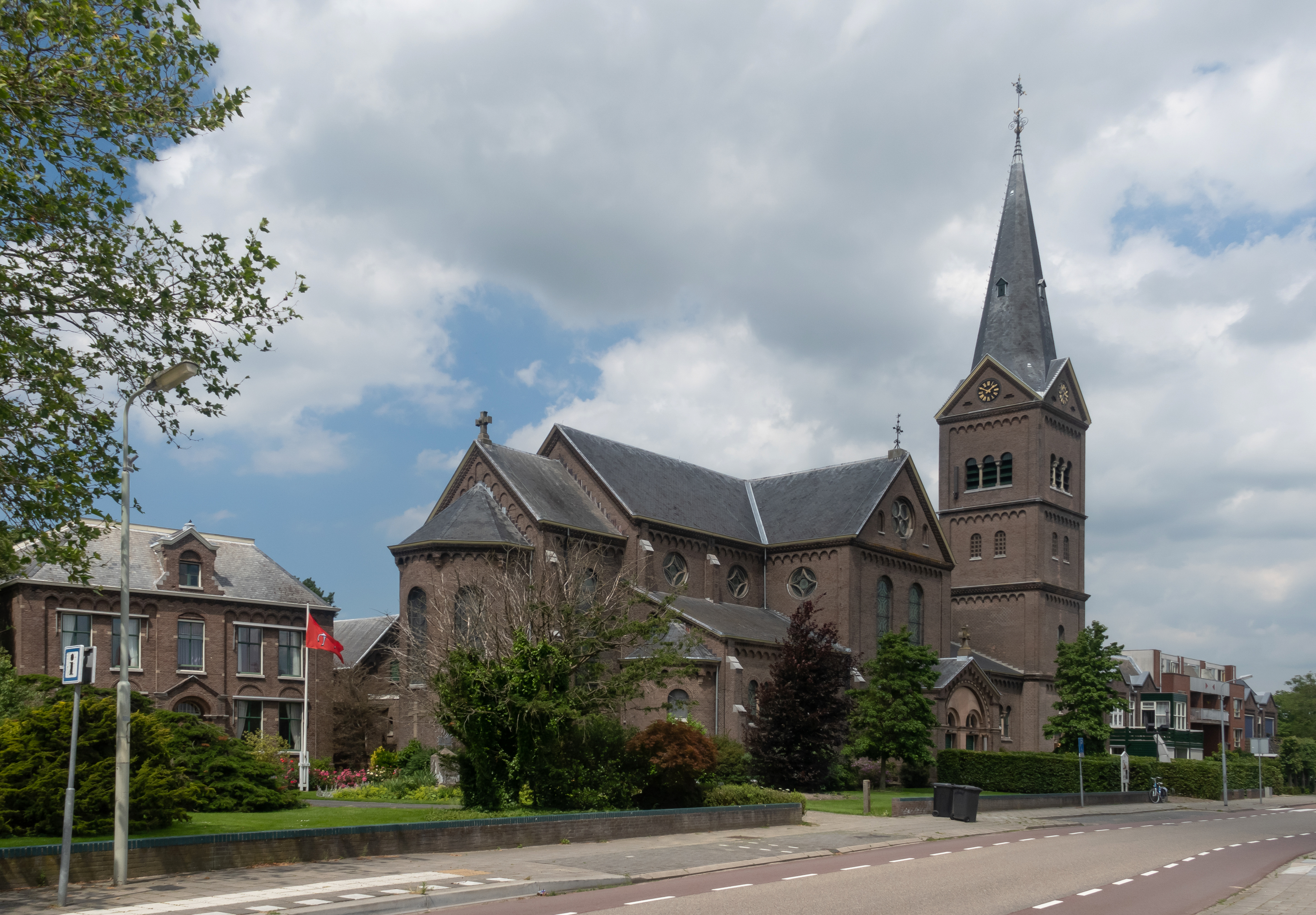
Assendelft, church: the Sint-Odulphuskerk

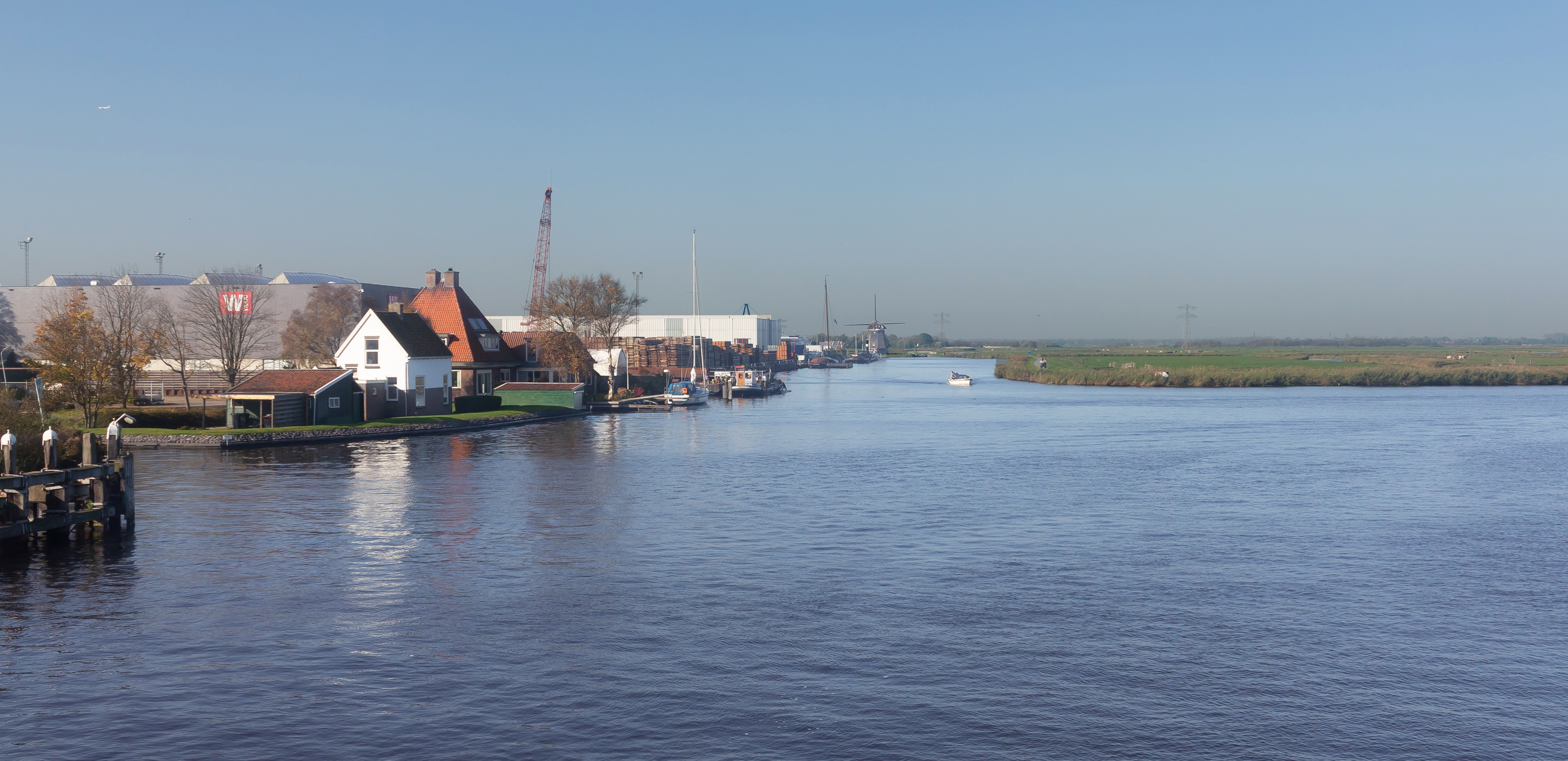
Westknollendam, ditch: de Tapsloot

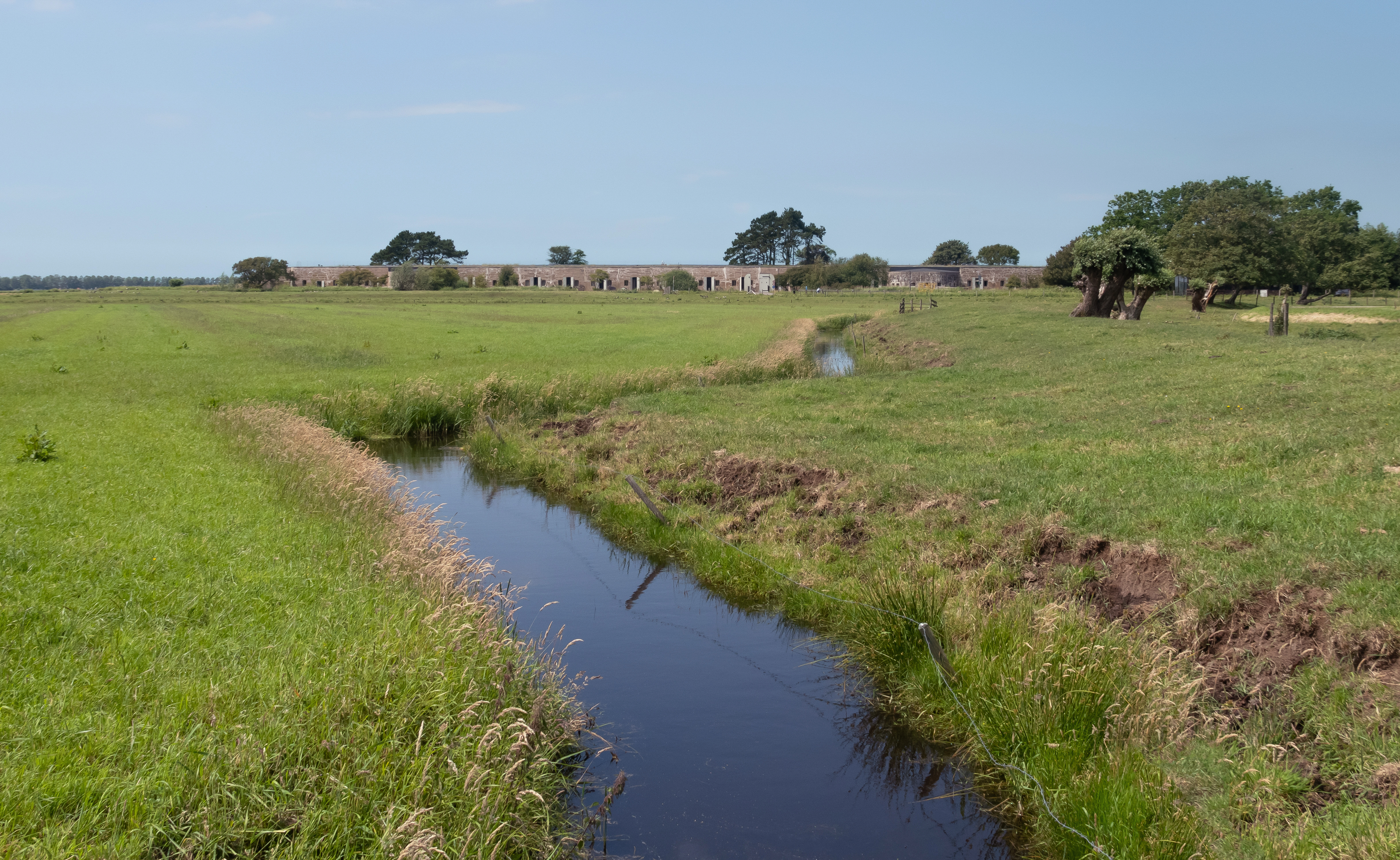
The fort near Krommeniedijk
