= A8ernA =

Public space in Koog aan de Zaan, Zaanstad, Netherlands

- Interactive map of A8ernA
- Type: Urban public space
- Location: Koog aan de Zaan, Zaanstad, Netherlands
- Coordinates: 52.4635°N 4.8084°E
- Created: 2006
- Status: Open

A8ernA is a public space in Koog aan de Zaan, Zaanstad, the Netherlands. The urban renewal project cost €2,700,000 and was a Joint Winner of the 2006 European Prize for Urban Public Space.

== Features ==
A8ernA makes use of the space under the A8 motorway bridge as it passes through Koog aan de Zaan. It contains an area for teenagers consisting of a graffiti zone, a skateboarding park, a break dance stage, ping-pong tables, a small football pitch, a basketball court and benches for couples.

== Construction ==
The semi-spherical concavities in the skateboarding park were built using blocks of polystyrene cut to measure with a computer-controlled saw and coated with concrete.
