= Koog aan de Zaan =

- Village
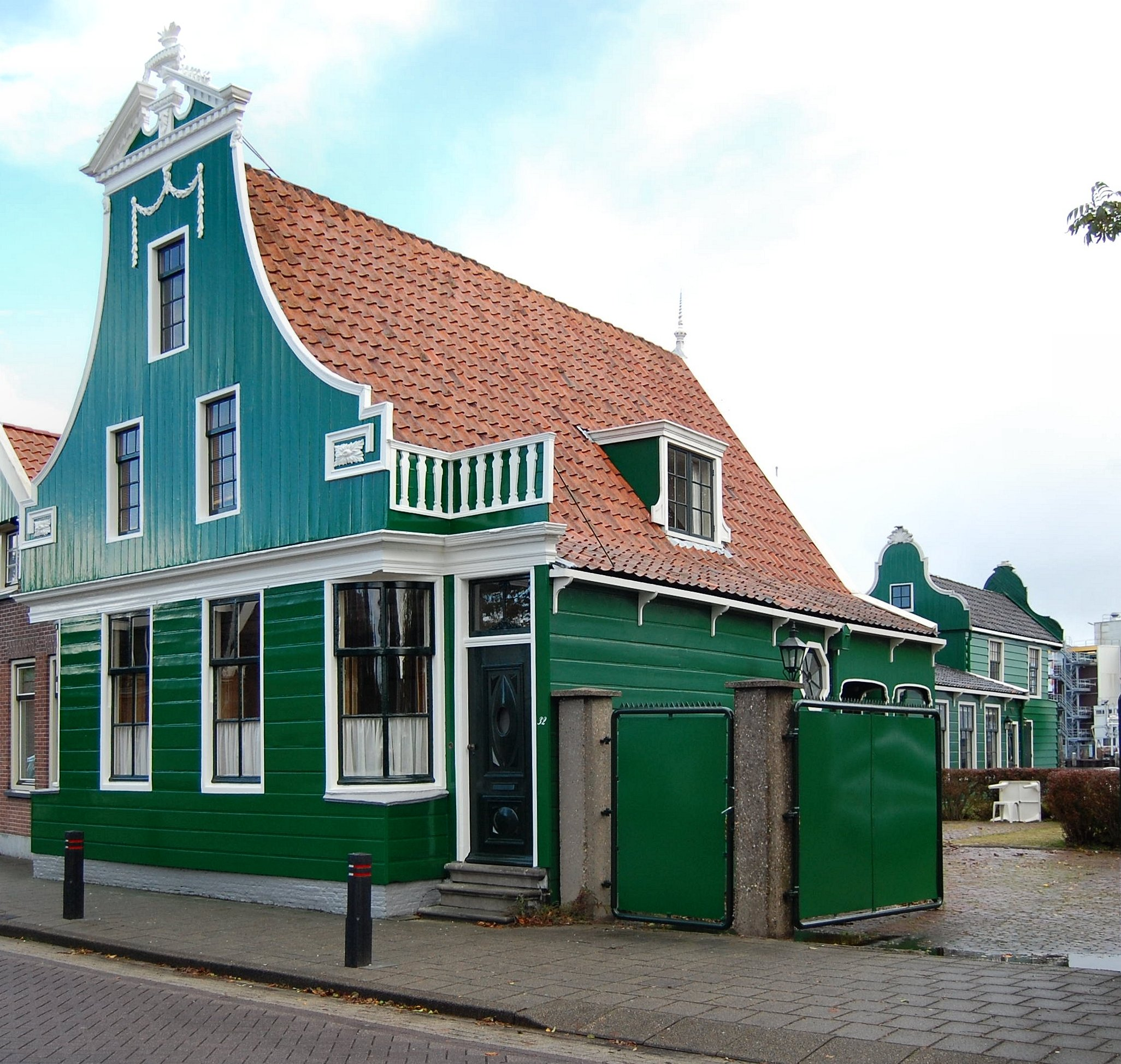
- Wooden house in Koog aan de Zaan

- Coat of arms

- Location in the Netherlands Location in the province of North Holland in the Netherlands
- Coordinates: 52°28′N 4°48′E
- Country: Netherlands
- Province: North Holland
- Municipality: Zaanstad

Area
  - Total: 3.18 km^{2} (1.23 sq mi)
- Elevation: −0.3 m (−0.98 ft)

Population (2021)
  - Total: 11,225
  - Density: 3,530/km^{2} (9,140/sq mi)
- Time zone: UTC+1 (CET)
  - Summer (DST): UTC+2 (CEST)
- Postal code: 1541
- Dialing code: 075

Koog aan de Zaan (Dutch pronunciation: [ˈkoːx aːn də ˈzaːn]) is a town in the Dutch province of North Holland. It is a part of the municipality of Zaanstad, and lies about 11 km northwest of Amsterdam.

== History ==
Koog aan de Zaan developed in the 16th century on the western bank of the Zaan River from Westzaan. In 1867, the Koog aan de Zaan railway station opened and in the 1870s, it started to industrialise and fill-in the area before the river and the station.

The Dutch Reformed church is an aisleless cruciform church which was built in 1685. The tower burnt down in 1920, and the church was restored between 1920 and 1922.

Koog aan de Zaan was a separate municipality until 1974, when the municipality of Zaanstad was created. Koog aan de Zaan is one of the smallest submunicipalities in Zaanstad, having a surface area of 320 hectare.

A8ernA, an urban renewal project for the space under the A8 motorway as it passes through Koog aan de Zaan, was a joint winner of the 2006 European Prize for Urban Public Space.

== Trains ==
There are two small stations within the borders of Koog aan de Zaan. These are:

- Koog aan de Zaan railway station, which serves Koog aan de Zaan itself.
- Zaandijk Zaanse Schans railway station, which mainly serves Zaandijk and the Zaanse Schans, an open-air museum nearby in Zaandijk.

Zaandam railway station is the nearest main station. For Purmerend, Hoorn and Enkhuizen use Zaandam Kogerveld railway station.
