= Krommenie =

Town in North Holland, Netherlands

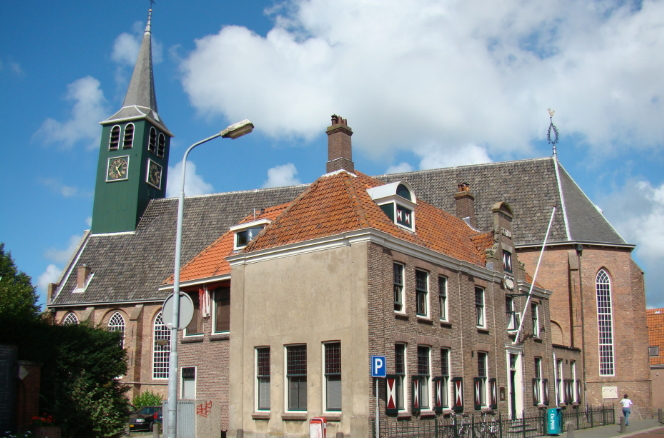
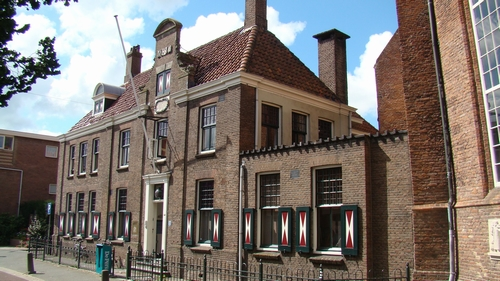

- Flag Coat of arms

- Location in the Netherlands Location in the province of North Holland in the Netherlands
- Country: Netherlands
- Province: North Holland
- Municipality: Zaanstad

Area
  - Total: 5.42 km^{2} (2.09 sq mi)
- Elevation: −0.7 m (−2.3 ft)

Population (2021)
  - Total: 18,955
  - Density: 3,500/km^{2} (9,060/sq mi)
- Time zone: UTC+1 (CET)
  - Summer (DST): UTC+2 (CEST)
- Postal code: 1561 & 1562
- Dialing code: 075

Krommenie (Dutch pronunciation: [ˌkrɔməˈni]) is a town in the Dutch province of North Holland. It is a part of the municipality of Zaanstad, and lies about 15 km northeast of Haarlem.

== History ==
Krommenie developed in the 11th century as a peat excavation settlement. In 1702, it severely damaged by fire. During the 19th century, Krommenie started to industrialise.

The Dutch Reformed church is a single aisled church from the 15th century. It was severely damaged in 1574 by fire and extensively modified and restored between 1657 and 1658. The Old Catholic Church was built in 1602 as a clandestine church in a farm. It was enlarged in 1633 and modified in 1826.

Krommenie was a separate municipality until 1974, when the new municipality of Zaanstad was created.

Krommenie is the first town in the world to have a solar bikepath (SolaRoad), a path made of a transparent surface over solar cells to generate electricity fed back to the grid. The path, over 70 meters long, was to test engineering feasibility.

== Train services ==
The town is served by Krommenie-Assendelft railway station. From here there are 4 trains an hour to Amsterdam in one direction and Uitgeest – Alkmaar in the other, with a journey time of 25 minutes.
