= Zaandam Kogerveld railway station =

Railway station in the Netherlands

Zaandam Kogerveld
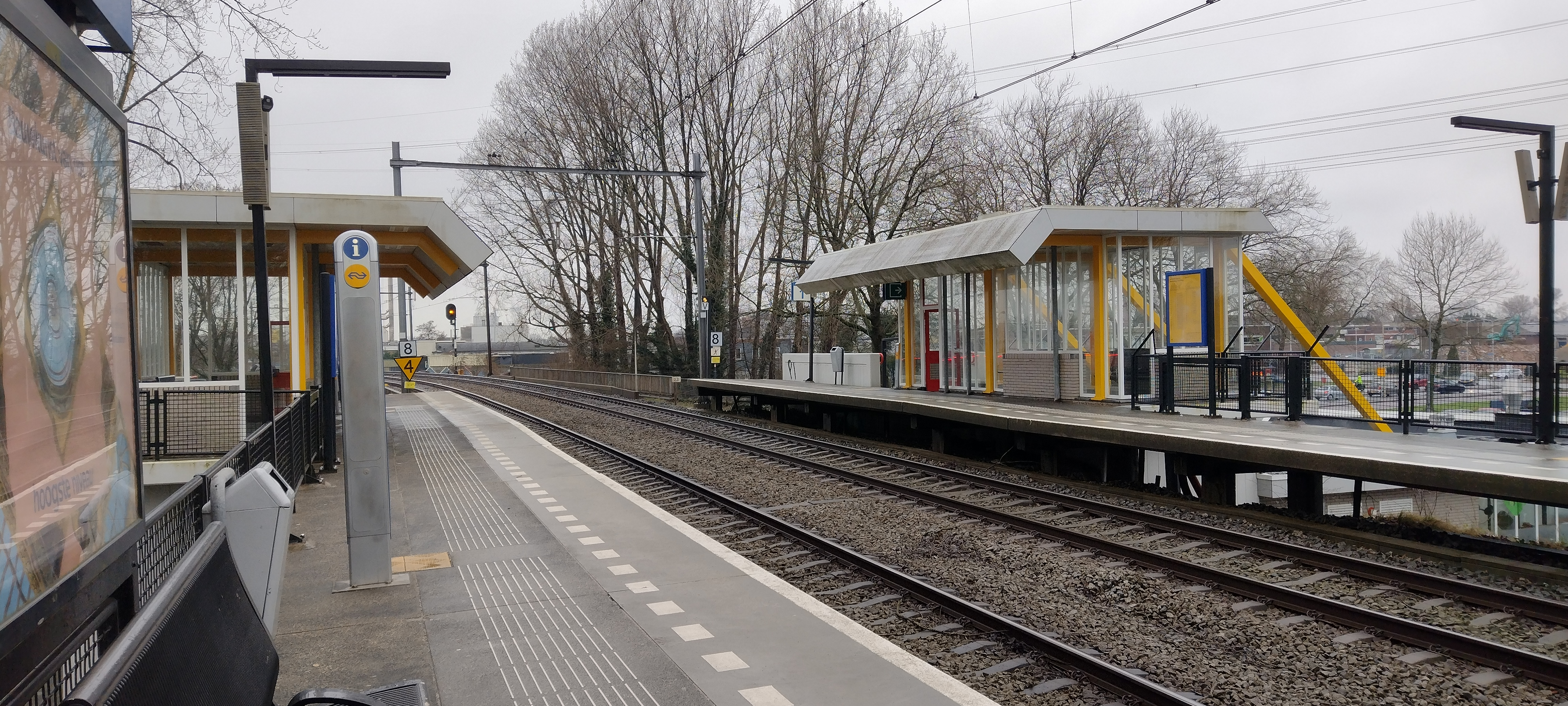
- Zaandam Kogerveld railway station in 2024

General information
- Location: Zaandam, North Holland, Netherlands
- Coordinates: 52°27′24″N 4°49′11″E
- Owner: Nederlandse Spoorwegen
- Line: Zaandam–Enkhuizen railway
- Platforms: 2
- Tracks: 2

History
- Opened: May 1989

Services
Preceding station	Nederlandse Spoorwegen	Following station
Zaandam towards Hoofddorp	NS Sprinter 4100	Purmerend Weidevenne towards Hoorn Kersenboogerd
Location
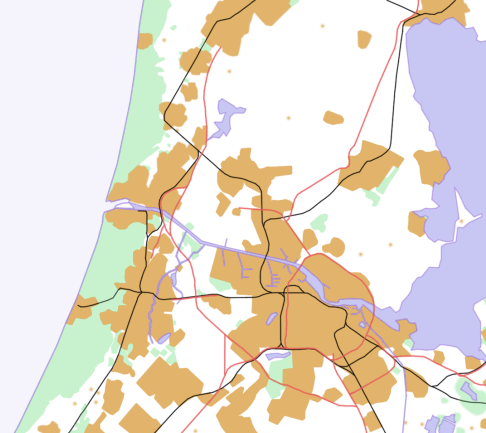
- Location within Northern Randstad Location within Netherlands

Zaandam Kogerveld is a railway station located in Zaandam, Netherlands. The station opened in 1989 on the Zaandam–Enkhuizen railway. The station is 2 km north of Zaandam railway station, and is in the Kogerveld neighbourhood. This station is a Zaandam suburb station. Hoornseveld and 't Kalf are two other neighbourhoods in the area served by the station.

Residents from Koog aan de Zaan also use this station for Purmerend and Hoorn.

== Train services ==
The following services call at Zaandam Kogerveld.

- 2x per hour local service (sprinter) Hoofddorp - Zaandam - Hoorn Kersenboogerd

== Bus services ==
The following bus servides call at Zaandam Kogerveld station. The bus stop is in Heijermansstraat.

Bus company	Bus Service	Route
MeerPlus	64	Zaandam Kogerveld - Zaandam Station - Koog a/d Zaan Westerkoog - Zaandijk Rooswijk
MeerPlus	69	Zaandam Station - Centrum - Koog a/d Zaan - Zaandijk - Wormerveer - Krommenie Station
R-Net	391	Zaandam Station - Centrum - Oostzaan - Amsterdam A v. Waertweg - Station Noord

== Gallery ==
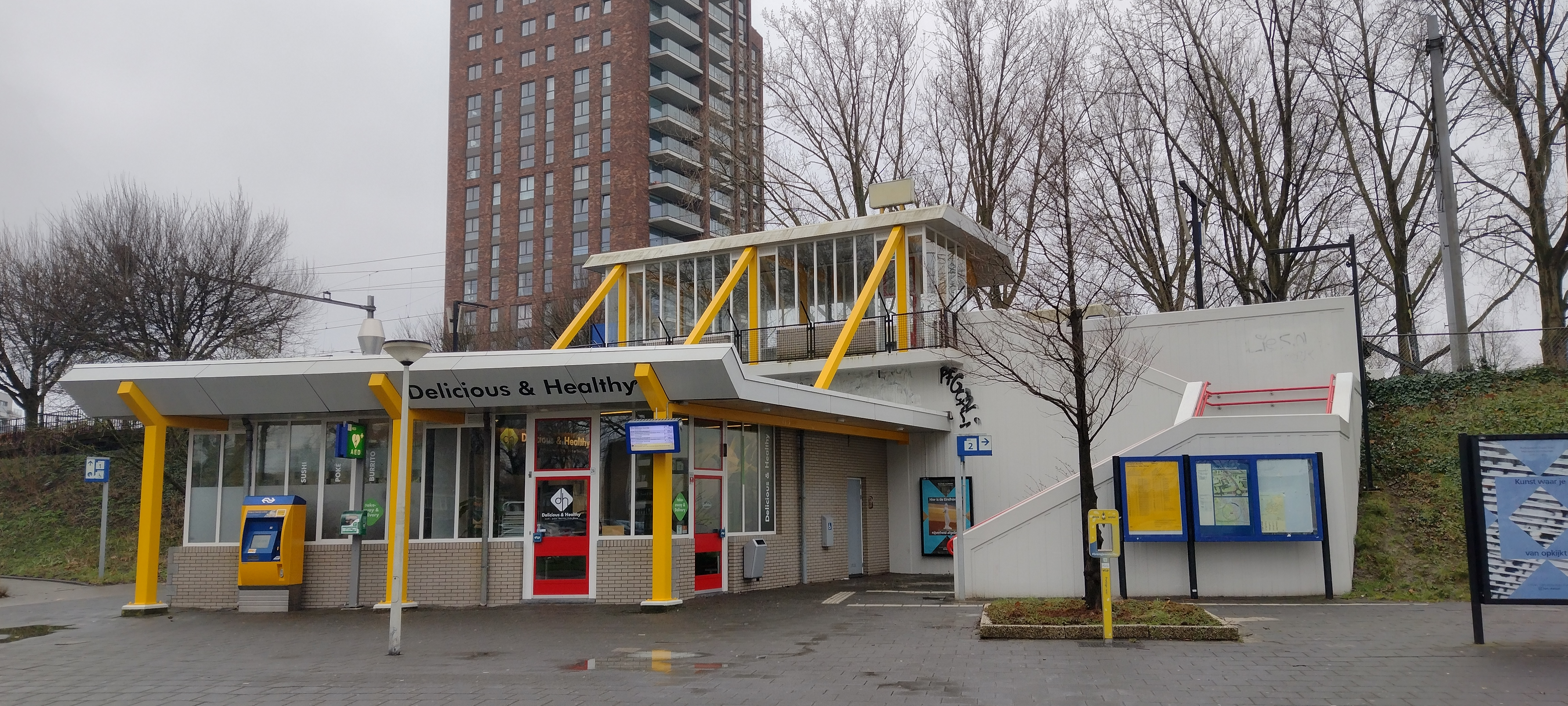
The old station building which currently houses a restaurant

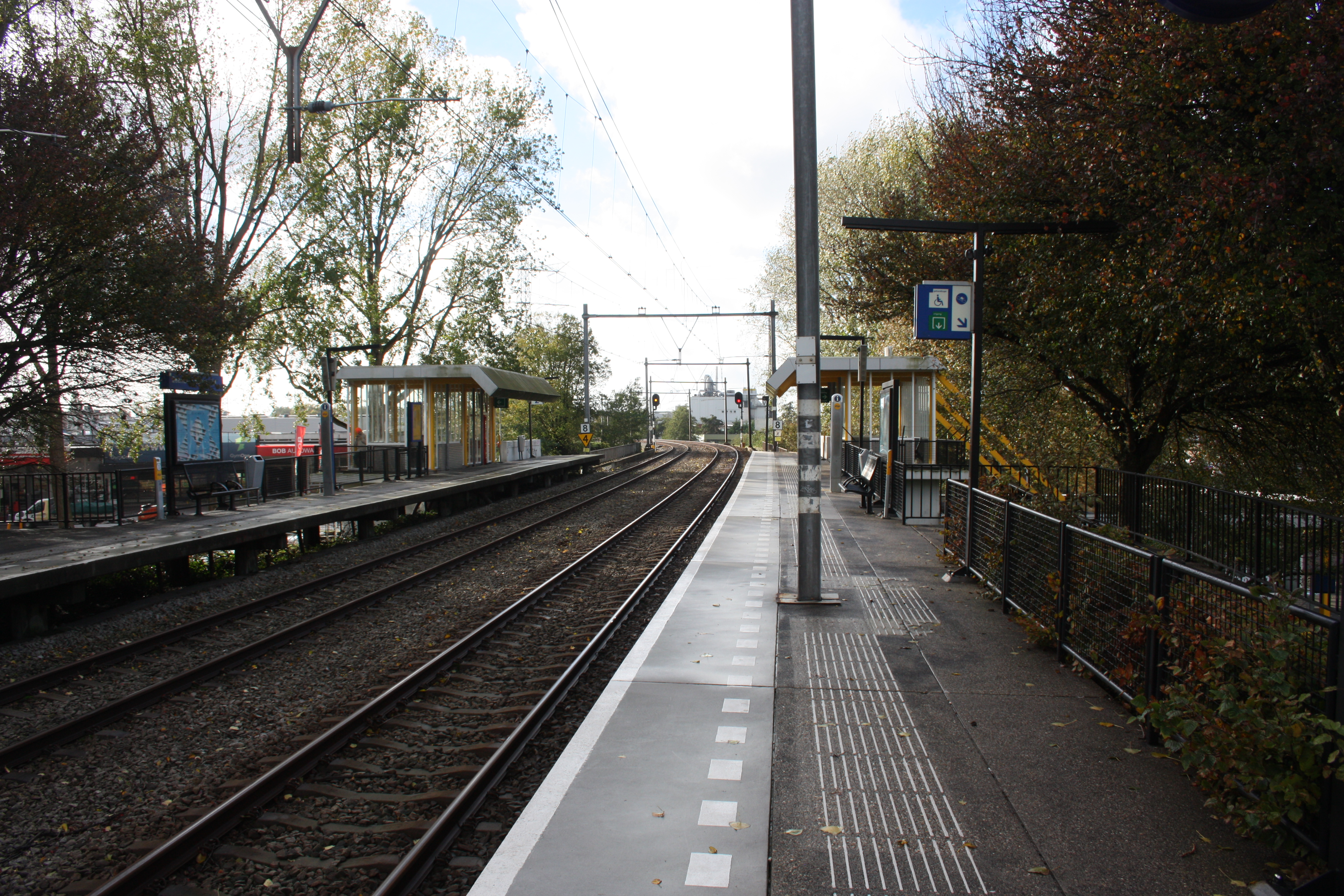
The 2 tracks servicing the station.

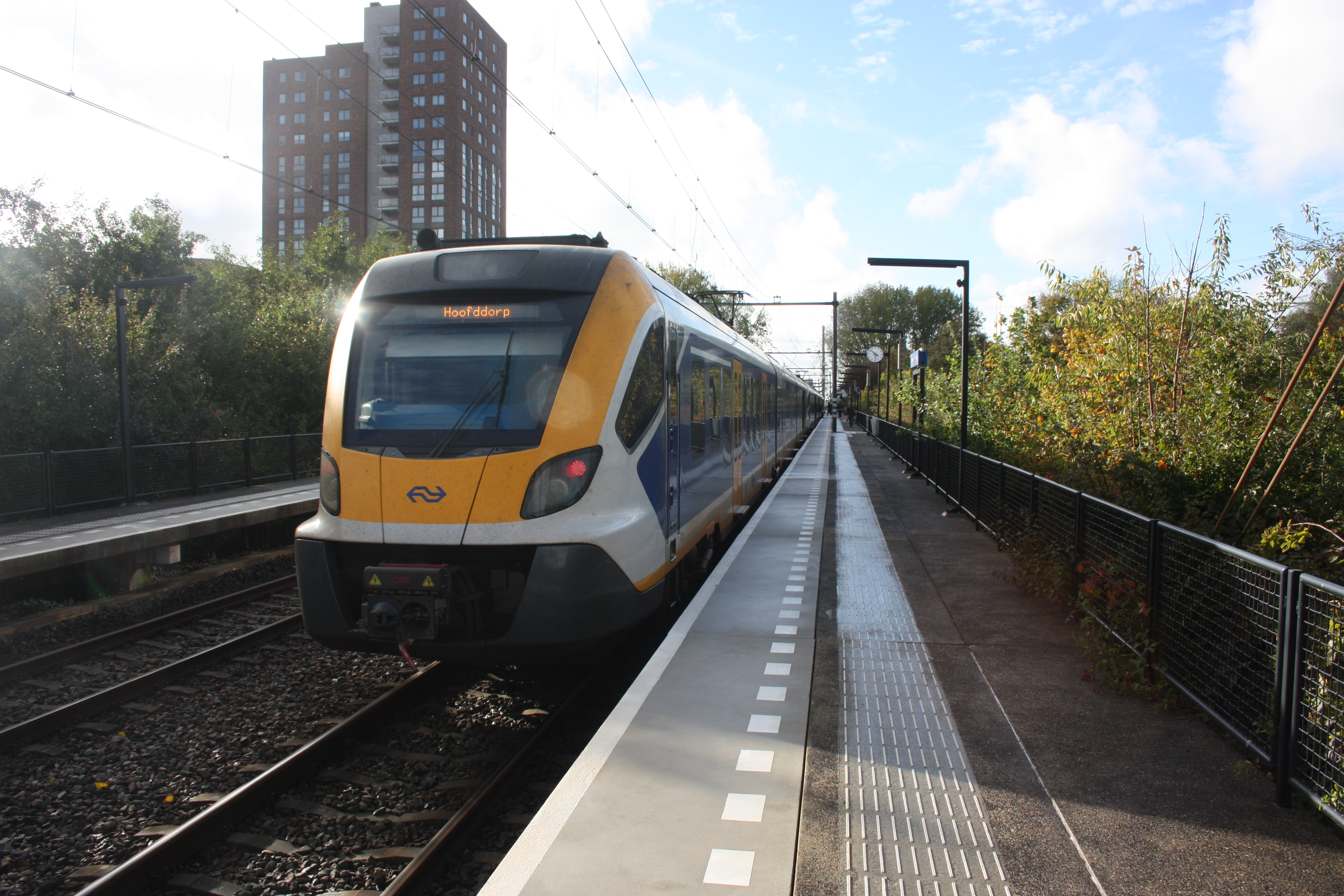
A stopped NS Sprinter bound for Hoofddorp

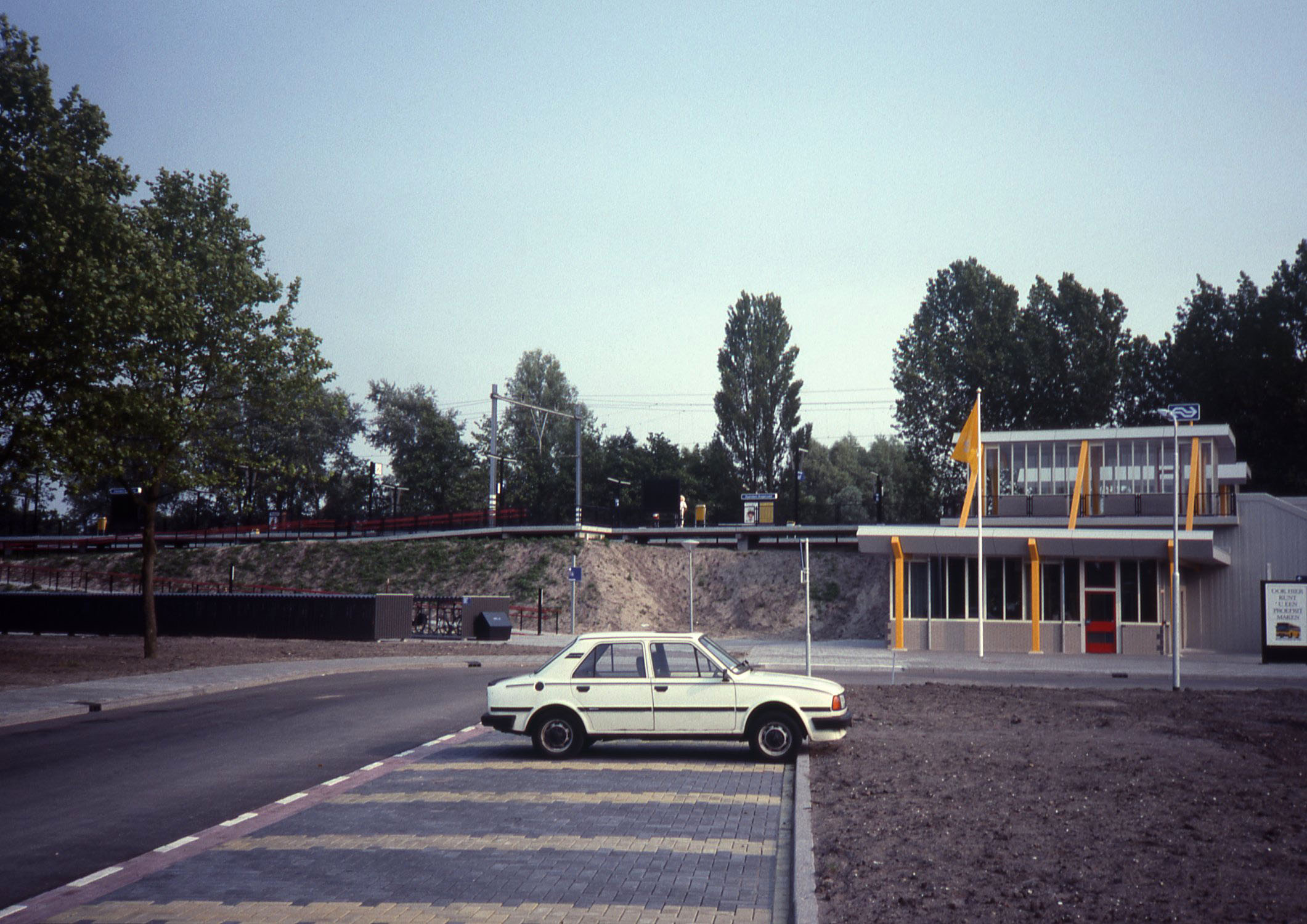
The train station in 1989 shortly after its opening

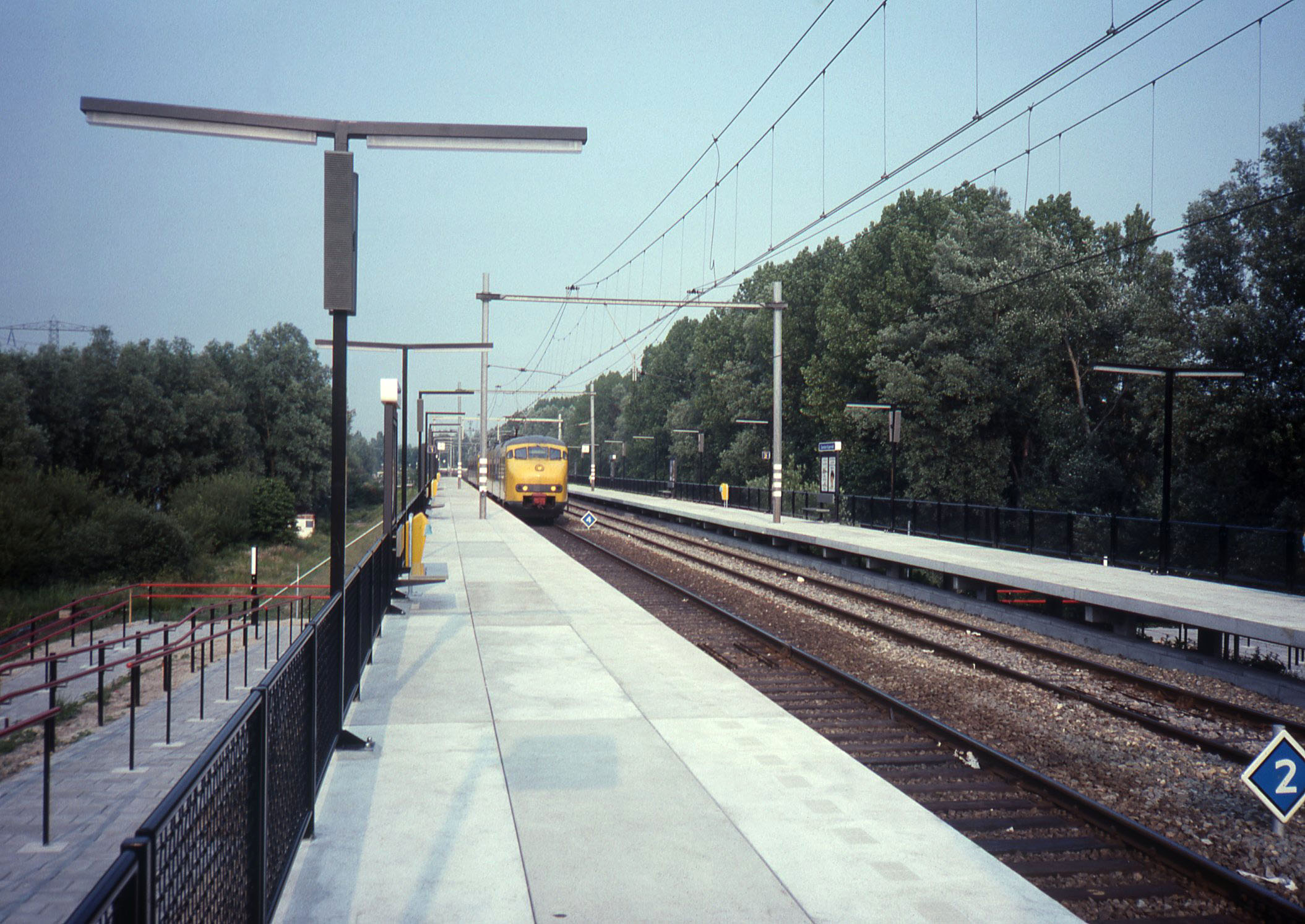
A Mat '64 train arriving at the station in 1989 after it just opened
