= Catharijnesingel =

Street and canal in Utrecht, the Netherlands

- Catharijnebaan
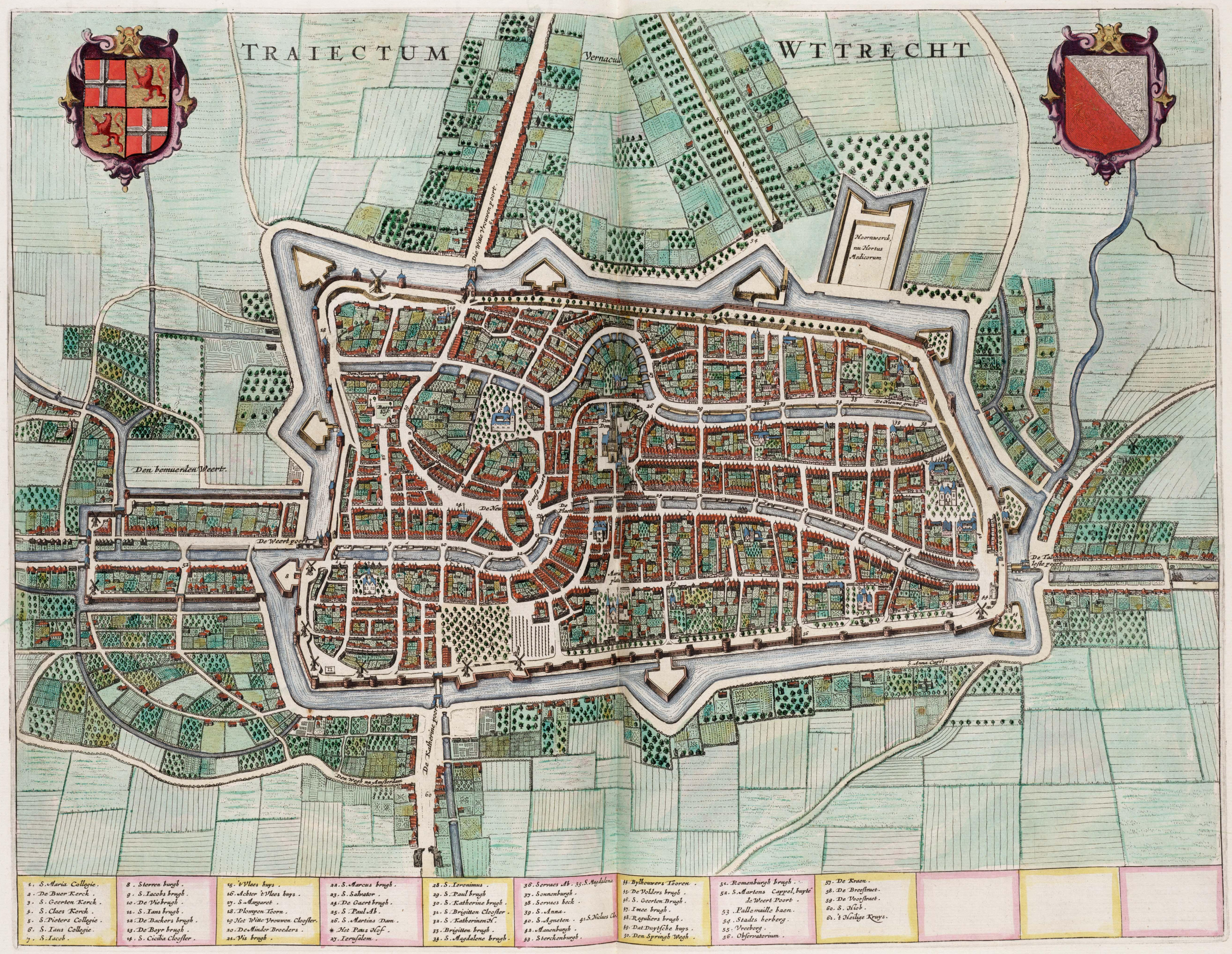
- Map of Utrecht in Joan Blaeu's Atlas Maior (1662-1672) showing the Catharijne singel as the long straight part of the moat at the bottom of the city.
- Interactive map of Catharijnesingel
- Length: 1.7 km (1.1 mi)
- Location: Utrecht, Netherlands

The Catharijnesingel is a historic moat and roadway in the Dutch city of Utrecht. The street and canal run from the Ledig Erf and Westerkade to the Smakkelaarsveld and Daalsesingel into which it merges. The canal runs under Hoog Catharijne shopping center, which contains transparent glass panels giving visitors to Hoog Catharijne a view of the boats moving below.

From the Middle Ages until the 19th century, Utrecht was a fortified city surrounded by the moat and bastions, which restricted the city's development. In the 19th century, the city lost its military function when the New Dutch Waterline was constructed which included the defence of Utrecht. In 1830 the walls were demolished and the area around the moat was transformed into the English style park Zocherplantsoen, named after its architect Jan David Zocher jr.

== Temporary replacement by highway (1973-2010) ==
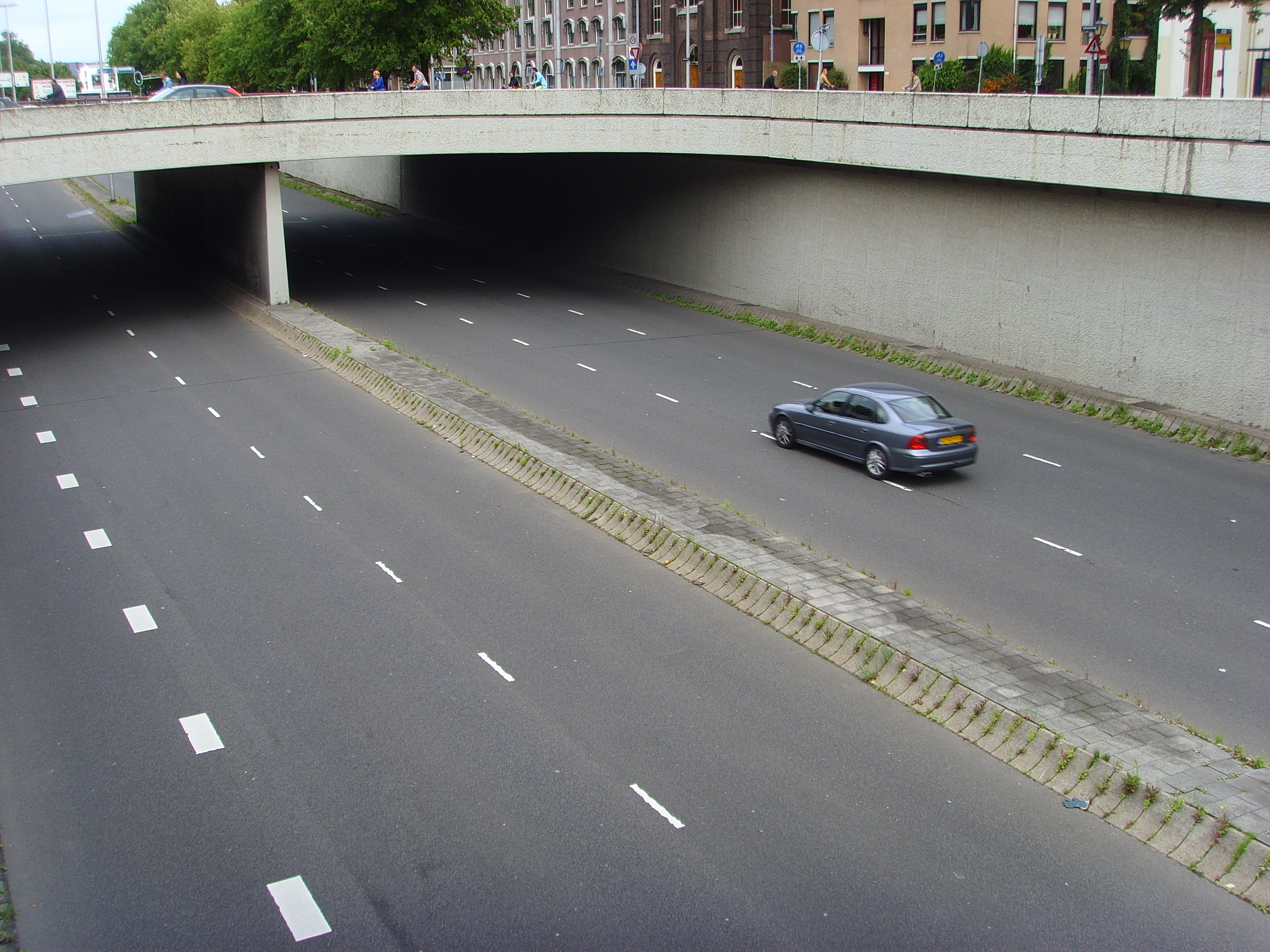
The highway (Catharijnebaan) on the location of the canal (2008)

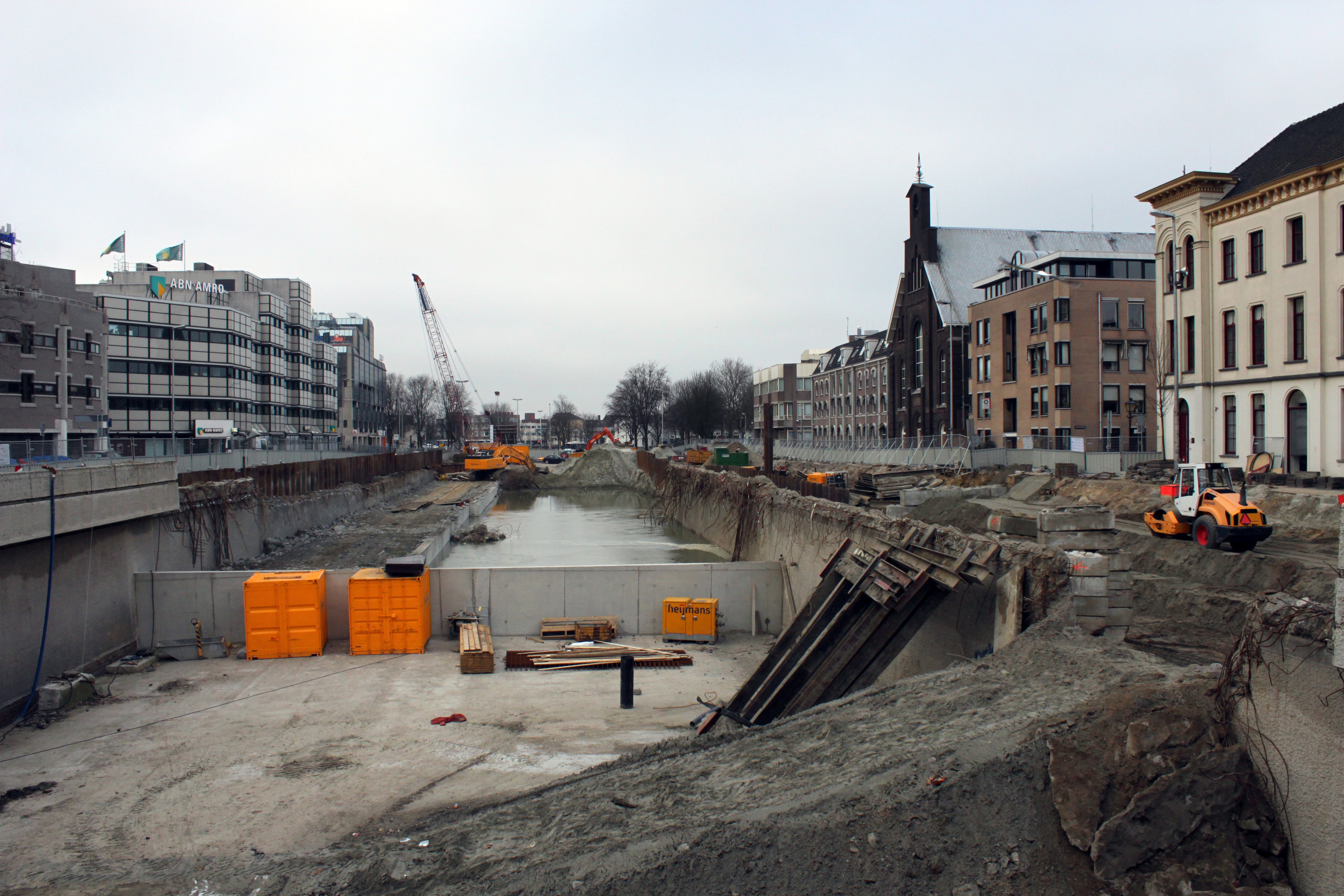
Demolition of the highway during the reconstruction (2011)

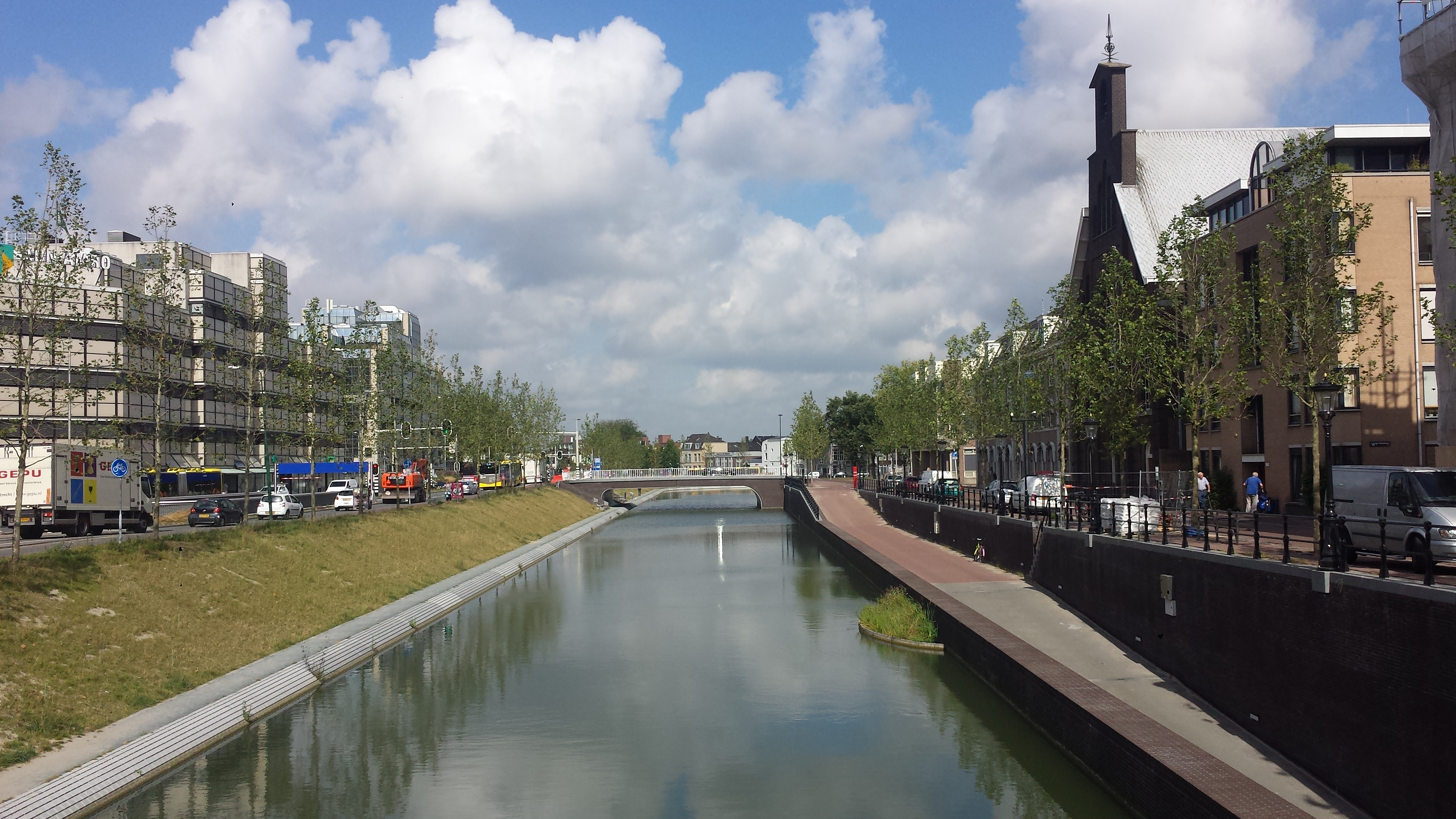
The same location, after the reconstruction of the canal (2016)

In the second half of the 20th century, it was decided to replace the water in the Catharijnesingel with a motorway. In 1973, the original canal was drained and replaced with the Catharijnebaan, which was a short sunken city highway in the city center of Utrecht that was closed to traffic in 2010 as part of an urban development project to make Utrecht safer for pedestrians. Restoration of the old moat structure commenced in 2000 and the motorway has been converted into a moat with adjacent park. In 2020, the canal was restored and opened to the public, allowing boats to circle the old center of the city once more. The restoration project was distinguished with the European Prize for Urban Public Space.

== Gallery ==
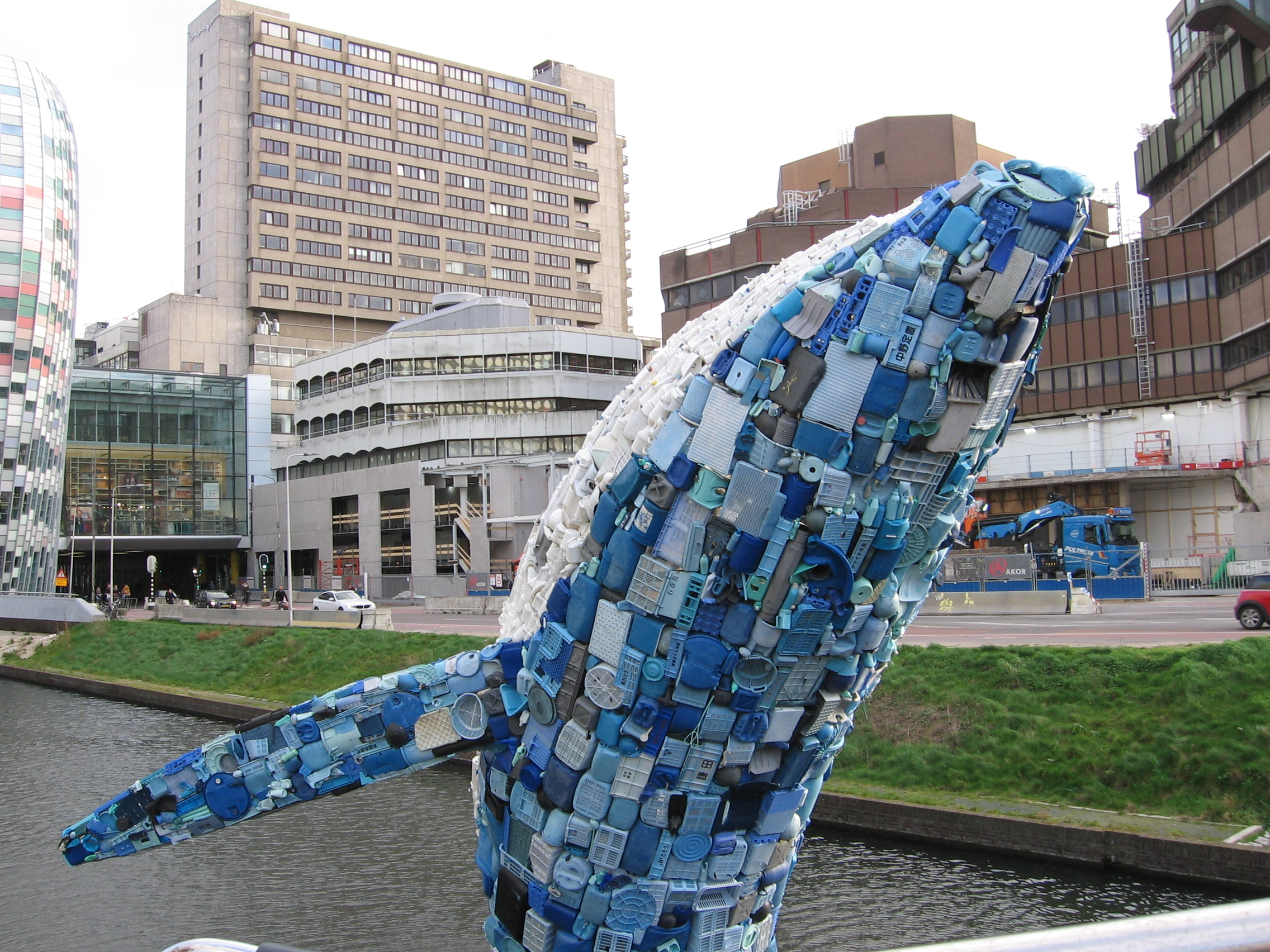
Plastic whale in the Catharijnesingel at TivoliVredenburg 2019

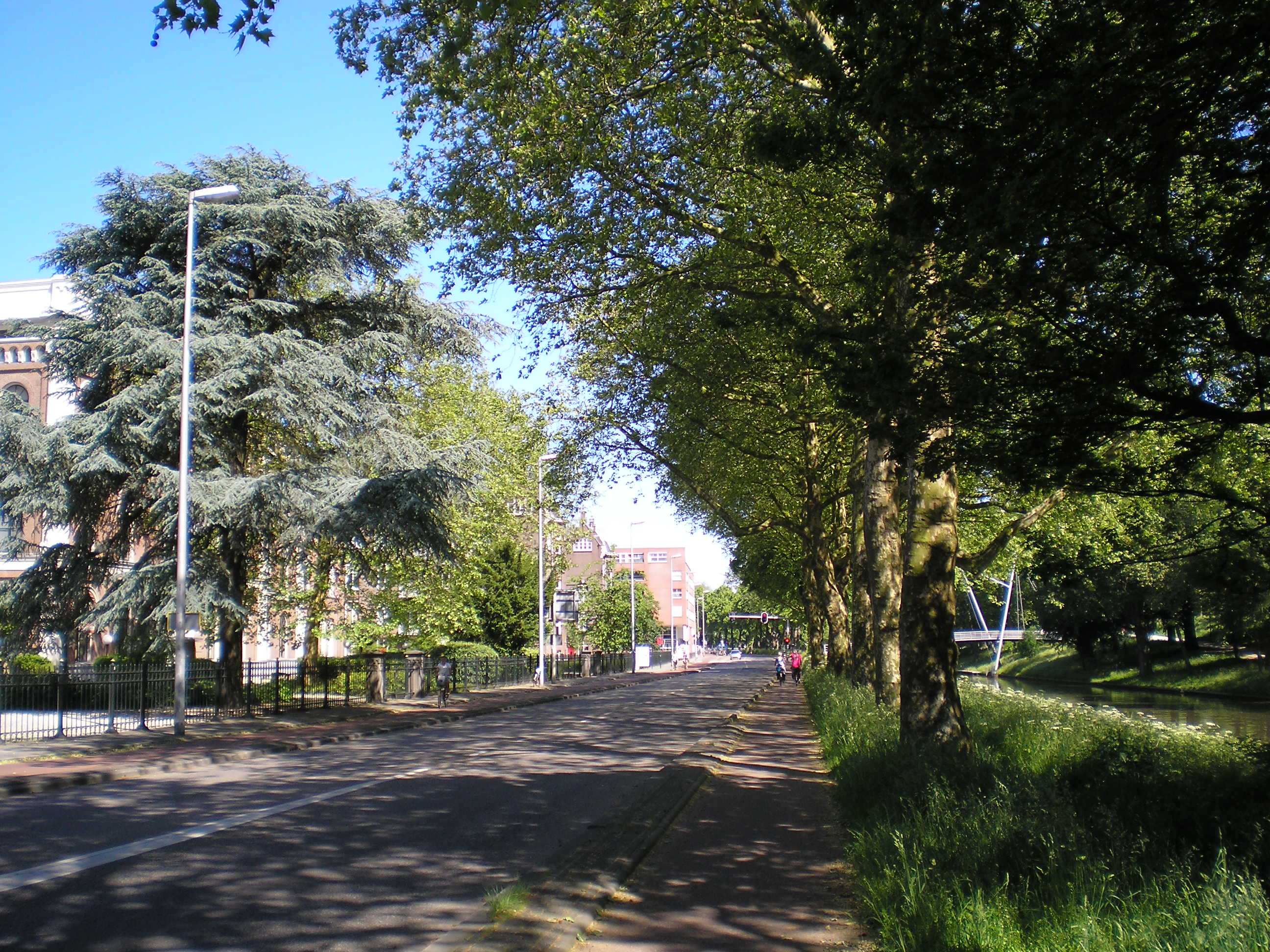
Catharijnesingel with the former Academic Hospital Utrecht in 2012
