= Wormerveer railway station =

Railway station in the Netherlands

Station Wormerveer
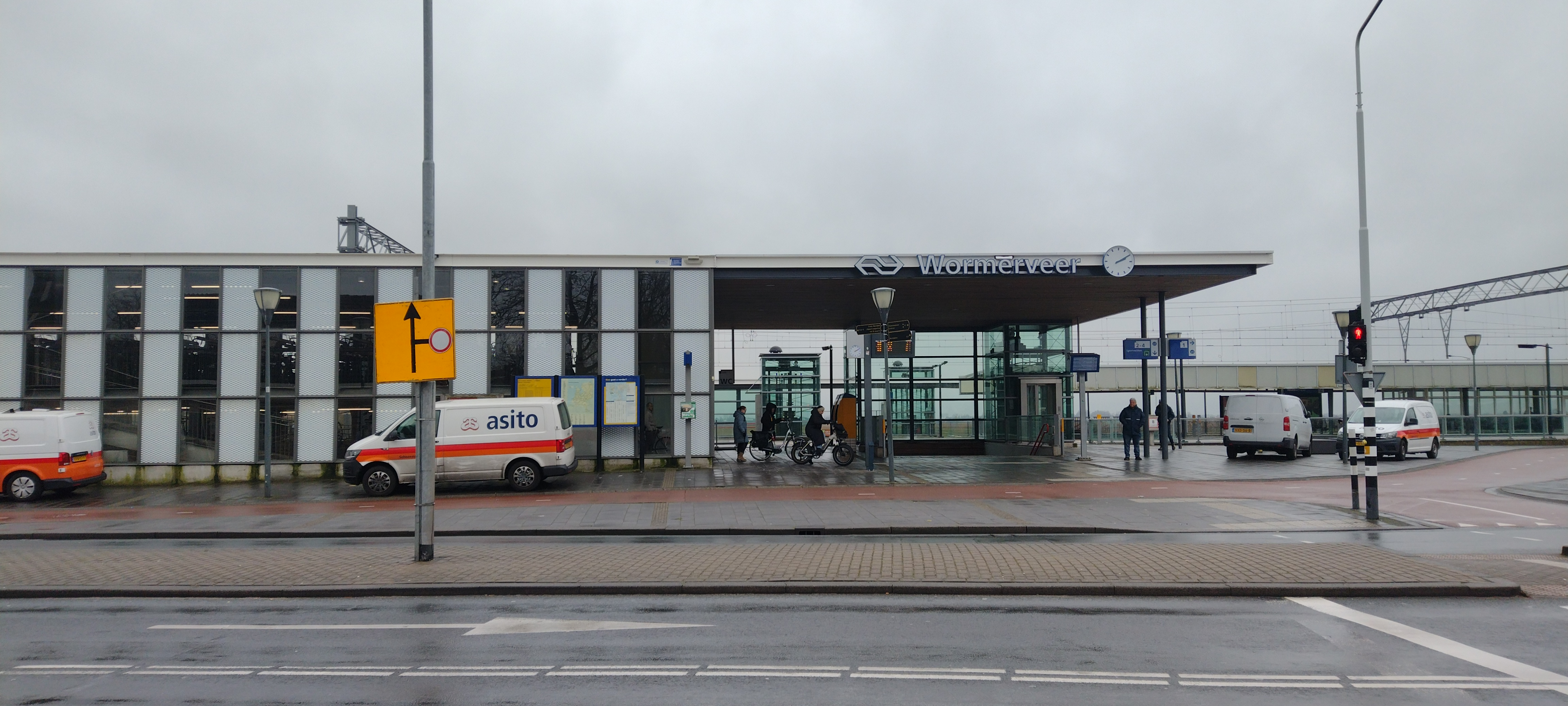

General information
- Location: Netherlands
- Coordinates: 52°29′21″N 4°47′34″E
- Line: Den Helder–Amsterdam railway
- Platforms: 1, 2+3, 4.

Other information
- Station code: WM0

History
- Opened: 1 November 1869

Services
Preceding station	Nederlandse Spoorwegen	Following station
Krommenie-Assendelft towards Uitgeest	NS Sprinter 4000	Zaandijk Zaanse Schans towards Rotterdam Centraal
Krommenie-Assendelft towards Uitgeest	NS Sprinter 7400 Peak hours only	Zaandijk Zaanse Schans towards Driebergen-Zeist
Location
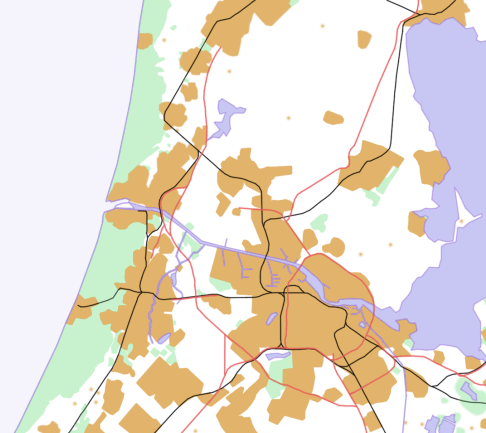
- Location within Northern Randstad Location within Netherlands

Wormerveer is a railway station in Wormerveer, Netherlands. The station was opened on the Den Helder–Amsterdam railway on 1 November 1869. The station is on the southern edge of the town, approx. 200m south of the river Zaan. Behind the station are many fields of marshes and reeds, As well as a local Football club and Paintball area. The train services are operated by Nederlandse Spoorwegen.

== Train services ==
The following train services call at Wormerveer:

- 2x per hour local service (sprinter) Uitgeest - Zaandam - Amsterdam - Woerden - Rotterdam (all day, every day)
- 2x per hour local service (sprinter) Uitgeest - Zaandam - Amsterdam - Utrecht - Rhenen (only on weekdays until 8:00PM)

== Bus services ==
The following bus services call at/start from Wormerveer

Operator: Connexxion Concession area: Zaanstreek
Line	Route	Bus type	Specifics
67	Zaandam - Zaandijk - Wormerveer	VDL Ambassador	
68	Zaandam - Wormerveer - Krommenie - Assendelft	VDL Ambassador	
69	Assendelft - Krommenie - Wormerveer - Zaandijk - Zaandam	VDL Ambassador	
414	Krommeniedijk - Krommenie - Wormerveer - Wormer - Oostknollendam	Mercedes-Benz Sprinter	Buurtbus (Small township bus)
N94	Amsterdam -> Zaandam -> Zaandijk -> Wormerveer -> Krommenie -> Westzaan	VDL Ambassador	Niteliner
Operator: EBS Concession area: Waterland
121	Wormerveer - Wormer - Jisp - Neck - Purmerend	Mercedes-Benz Sprinter	
