= Zaandijk Zaanse Schans railway station =

Railway station in the Netherlands

Zaandijk Zaanse Schans
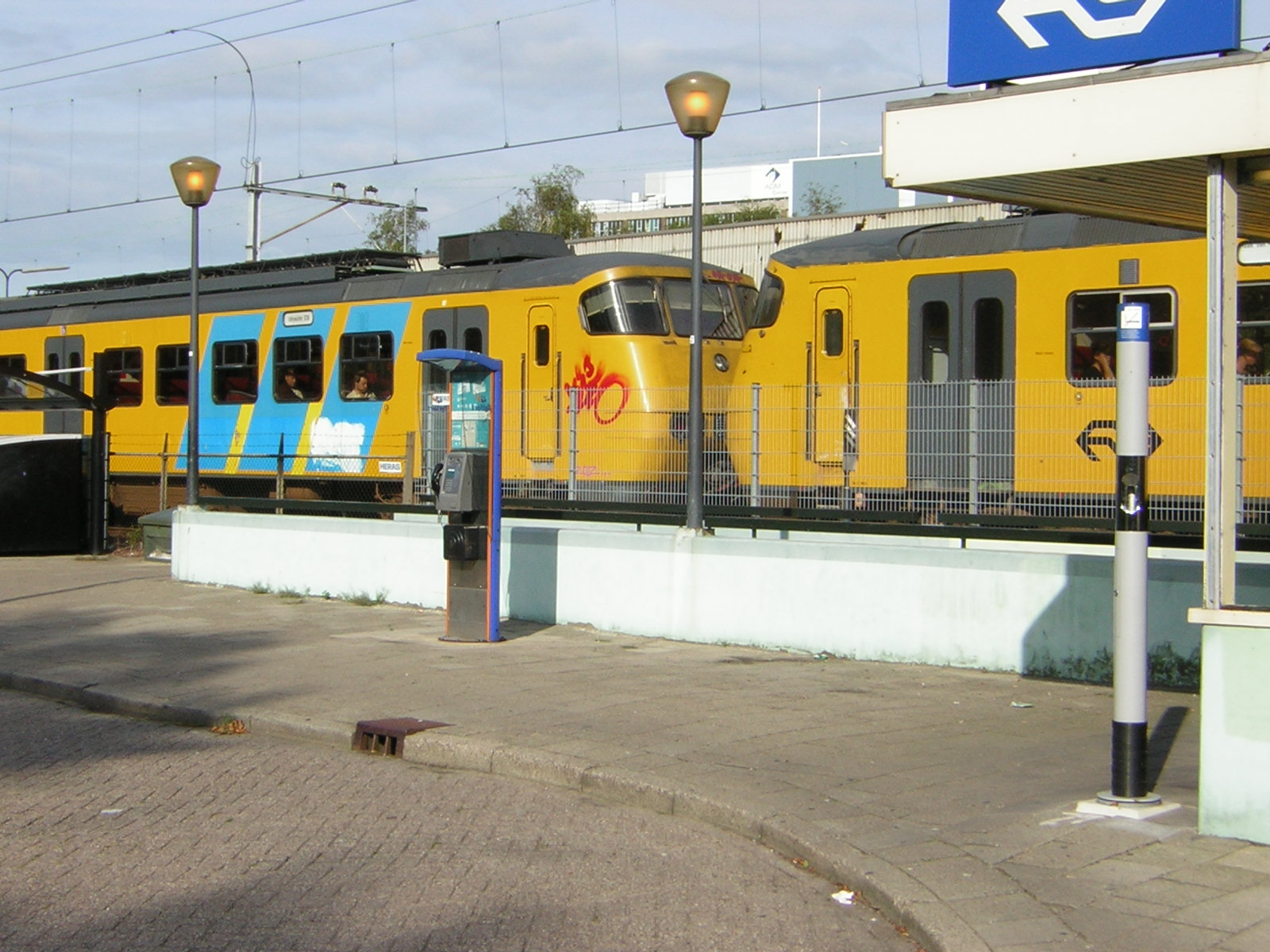
- Sprinter trains in old NS colours, holding at Zaandijk Zaanse Schans station

General information
- Location: Zaandam, Netherlands
- Coordinates: 52°28′9″N 4°48′17″E
- Line: Den Helder–Amsterdam railway
- Platforms: 1 and 2.

History
- Opened: 1 November 1869

Services
Preceding station	Nederlandse Spoorwegen	Following station
Wormerveer towards Uitgeest	NS Sprinter 4000	Koog aan de Zaan towards Rotterdam Centraal
Wormerveer towards Uitgeest	NS Sprinter 7400 Peak hours only	Koog aan de Zaan towards Driebergen-Zeist
Location
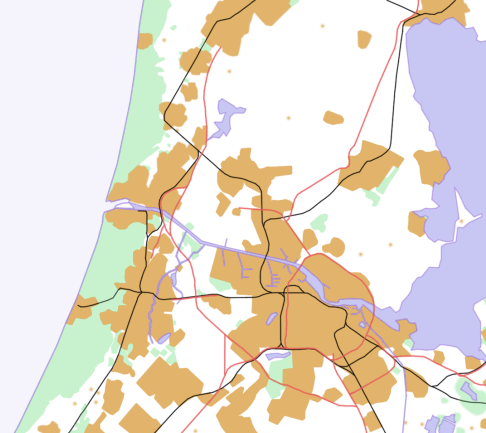
- Location within Northern Randstad Location within Netherlands

Zaandijk Zaanse Schans railway station, until 2016 Koog-Zaandijk railway station, is a railway station in Koog aan de Zaan and Zaandijk, both neighbourhoods of the municipality of Zaandam, Netherlands. It is also the closest railway station to Zaanse Schans. The station opened on 1 November 1869 and is located on the Den Helder–Amsterdam railway between Zaandam and Uitgeest.

== Renovation ==
When the old cargo platform was destroyed in 1976, the station gained a partial roof and an inside ticket and service kiosk. As automated ticketing machines proliferated in stations starting in 1980, smaller municipal stations like Zaandijk Zaanse Schans gradually phased out their use of ticket and service kiosks. Following the closure of the stations kiosk, it was left with minimal care and no facilities and was in need of modernisation and renovation. The station finished renovations in 2016, making it more accessible for people with disabilities. Three elevators have been installed, as well as disability-friendly toilets and special slopes to get in and out of trains. The waiting room has been redone, is heated and contains a minor food and gift shop. Train tickets are only available from ticket machines on the platform.

== Station name ==
Zaandijk Zaanse Schans station, being on the border of the two towns Zaandijk and Koog aan de Zaan and bordering 4 neighbourhoods (Old-Zaandijk, Rooswijk, Old-Koog aan de Zaan and Westerkoog) has shared the name since opening. Following renovations, local councilman Addy Verschuren stated the station should be renamed from Koog Zaandijk to fit the local tourist-attraction Zaanse Schans. Suggesting the name Zaandijk Zaanse Schans, to give visitors a better understanding on where to get off. The name change has been approved, and on 11 December 2016 the name was changed.

== Train services ==
The following train services call at Zaandijk Zaanse Schans:

- 2x per hour local service (sprinter) Uitgeest – Zaandam – Amsterdam – Woerden – Rotterdam (all day, every day)
- 2x per hour local service (sprinter) Uitgeest – Zaandam – Amsterdam – Utrecht – Rhenen (only on weekdays until 8:00PM)

== Bus services ==
The station also has a bus stop, 3 services make their stop here. During rail-disruptions, NS may run buses from these stops.

Operator: Connexxion Concession-area: Zaanstreek
Line	Route	Bus type	Specifics
67	Zaandam – Zaandijk – Wormerveer	VDL Ambassador low-floor bus	
69	Zaandam – Koog a/d Zaan – Wormerveer – Krommenie – Assendelft	VDL Ambassador low-floor bus	
N94	Amsterdam → Zaandam → Zaandijk → Wormerveer → Krommenie → Westzaan	VDL Ambassador low-floor bus	Niteliner
