= Koog aan de Zaan railway station =

Railway station in the Netherlands

Koog aan de Zaan
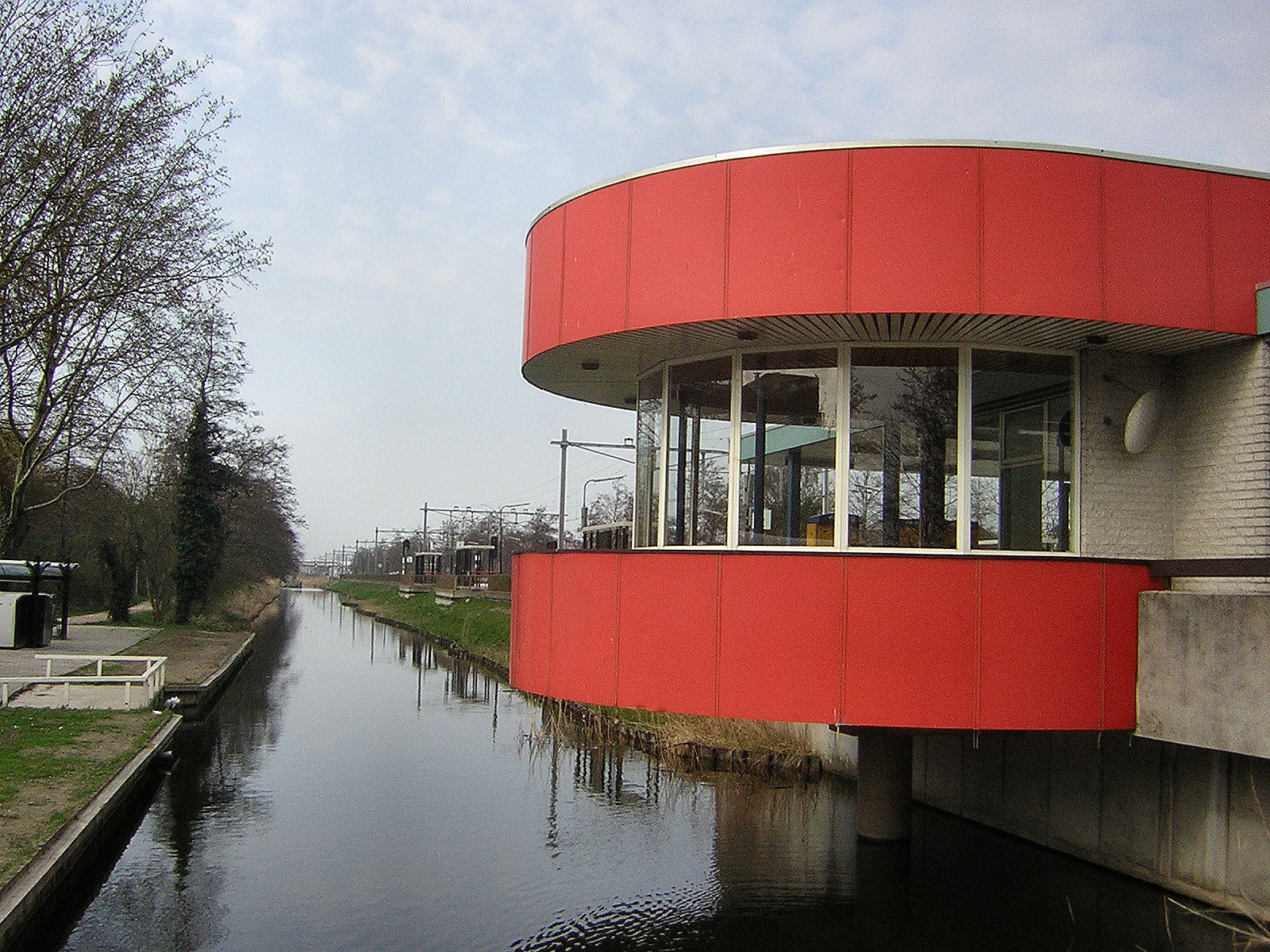

General information
- Location: Netherlands
- Coordinates: 52°27′28″N 4°48′20″E
- Line: Den Helder–Amsterdam railway

Services
Preceding station	Nederlandse Spoorwegen	Following station
Zaandijk Zaanse Schans towards Uitgeest	NS Sprinter 4000	Zaandam towards Rotterdam Centraal
Zaandijk Zaanse Schans towards Uitgeest	NS Sprinter 7400 Peak hours only	Zaandam towards Driebergen-Zeist
Location
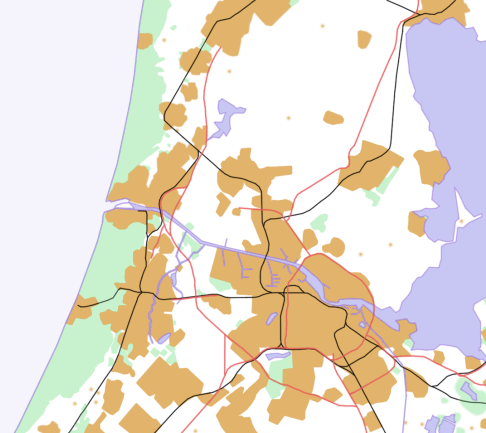
- Location within Northern Randstad Location within Netherlands

Koog aan de Zaan (until 2016 Koog Bloemwijk) is a railway station in Koog aan de Zaan, Netherlands. Koog aan de Zaan was opened on 1 November 1869, on the Den Helder–Amsterdam railway between Zaandam and Uitgeest. The station had a rectangular station building from 1956 to 1986.

== Train services ==
The following train services call at Koog aan de Zaan:

- 2x per hour local service (sprinter) Uitgeest - Zaandam - Amsterdam - Woerden - Rotterdam (all day, every day)
- 2x per hour local service (sprinter) Uitgeest - Zaandam - Amsterdam - Utrecht - Rhenen (only on weekdays until 8:00PM)

== Bus services ==
- 64 (Zaandam - Zaandijk Rooswijk)
