= European Prize for Urban Public Space =

Biennial award (est. 2000)

The European Prize for Urban Public Space is a biennial award established in 2000 to recognise public space projects. It is organised by the Centre de Cultura Contemporània de Barcelona together with six other European institutions: The Architecture Foundation, Cité de l'Architecture et du Patrimoine, Architekturzentrum Wien, Netherlands Architecture Institute, German Architecture Museum and the Museum of Finnish Architecture. The number of nominations for the prize increased from 81 projects in 2000 to 347 projects in 2012, while the number of countries participating increased form 14 in the first year to 36 in 2012.

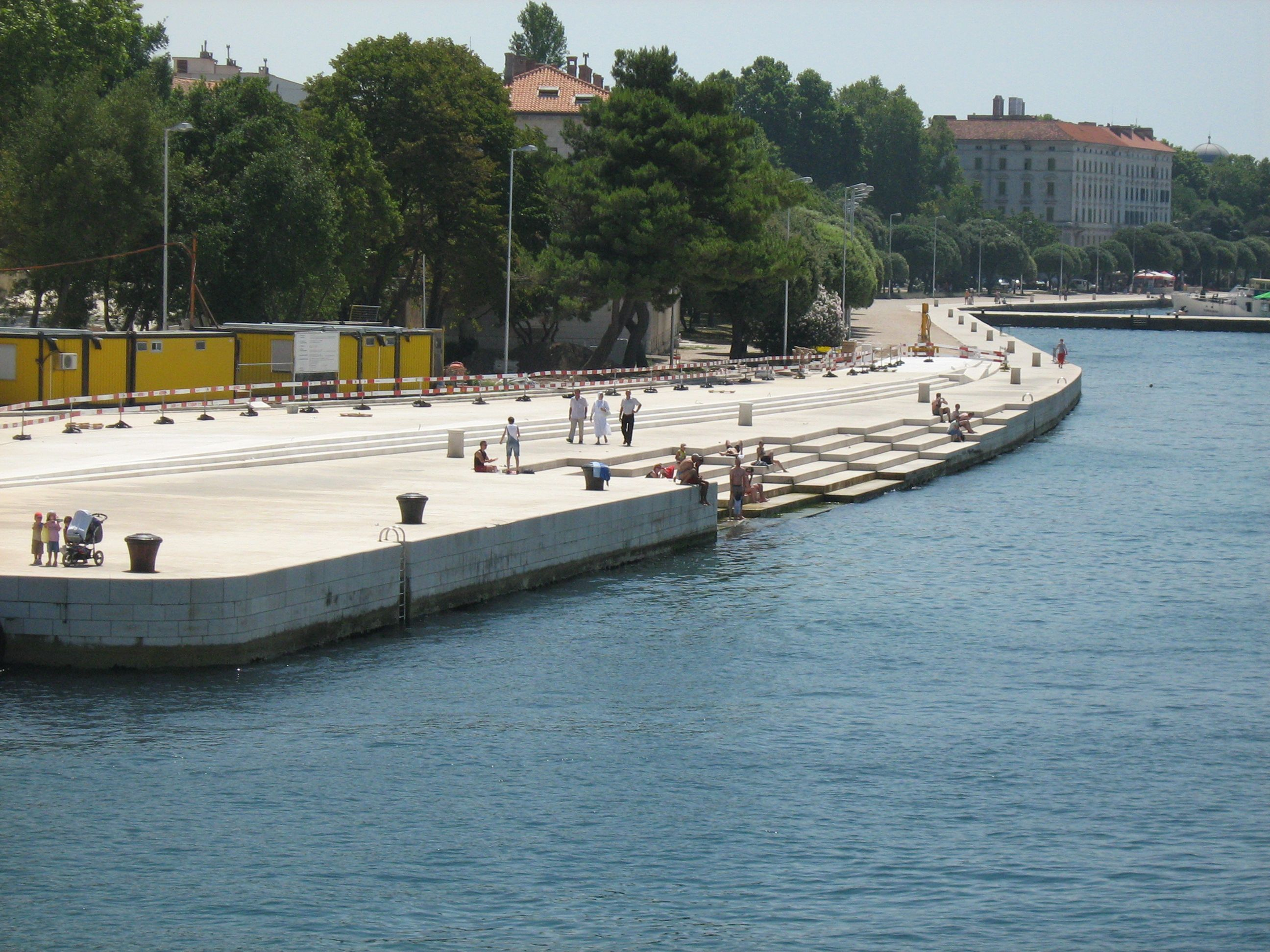
Sea organ, Zadar, Croatia (2006 winner)

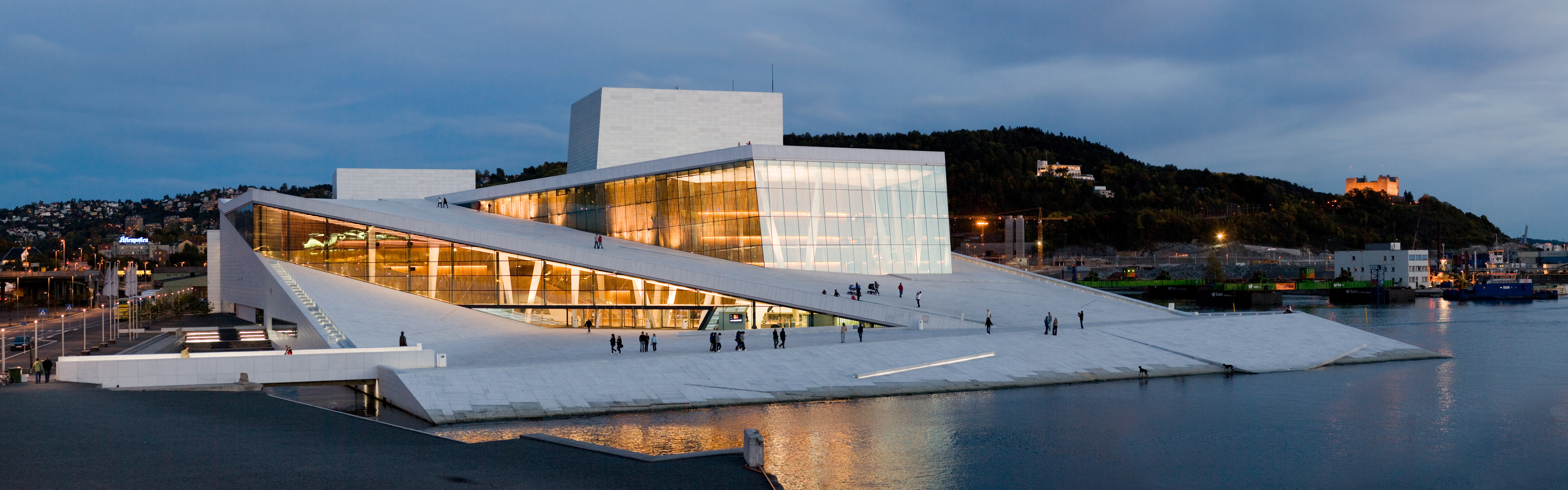
Oslo Opera House, Norway (2010 winner)

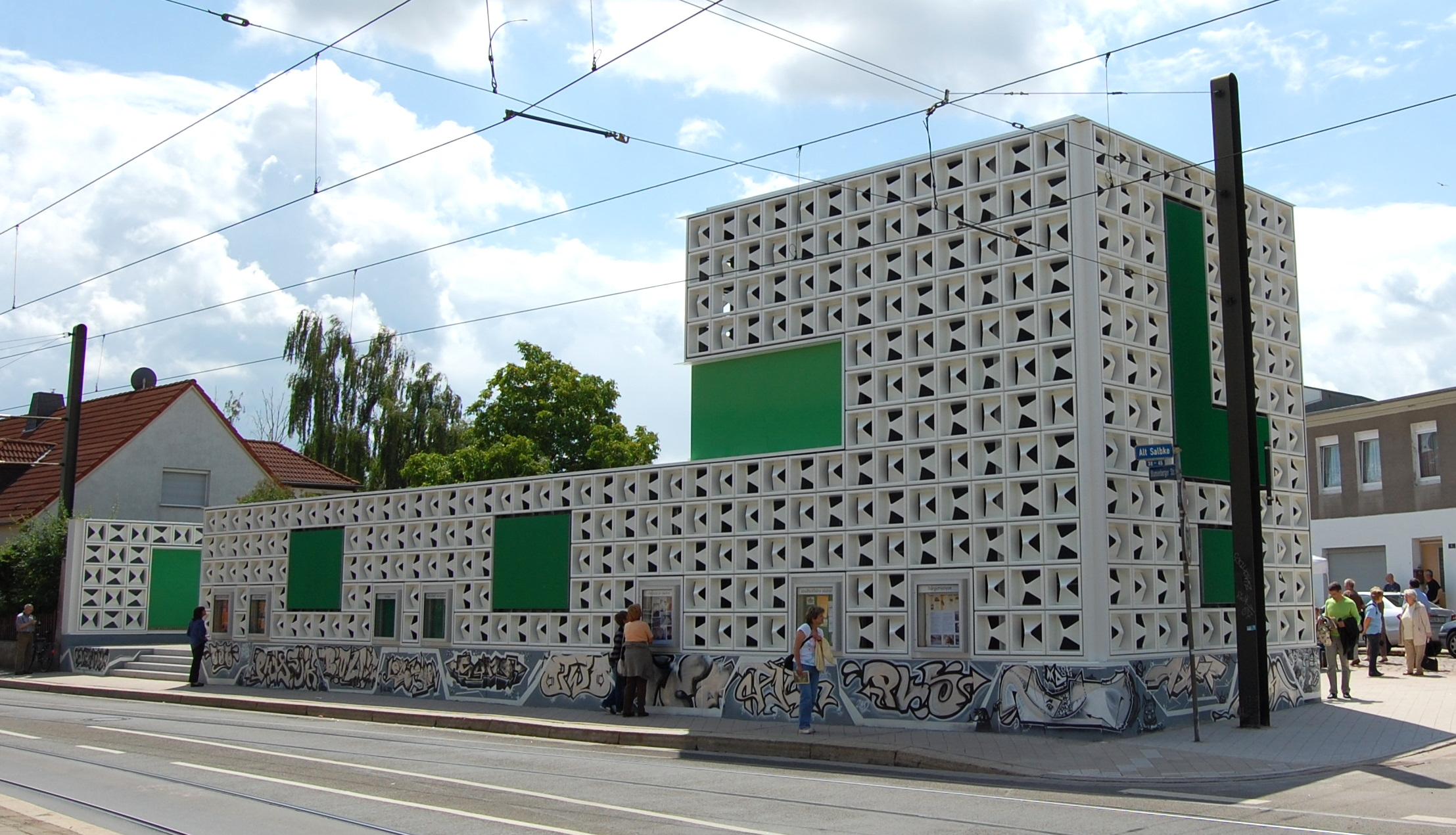
Open-Air-Library, Magdeburg, Germany (2010 winner)

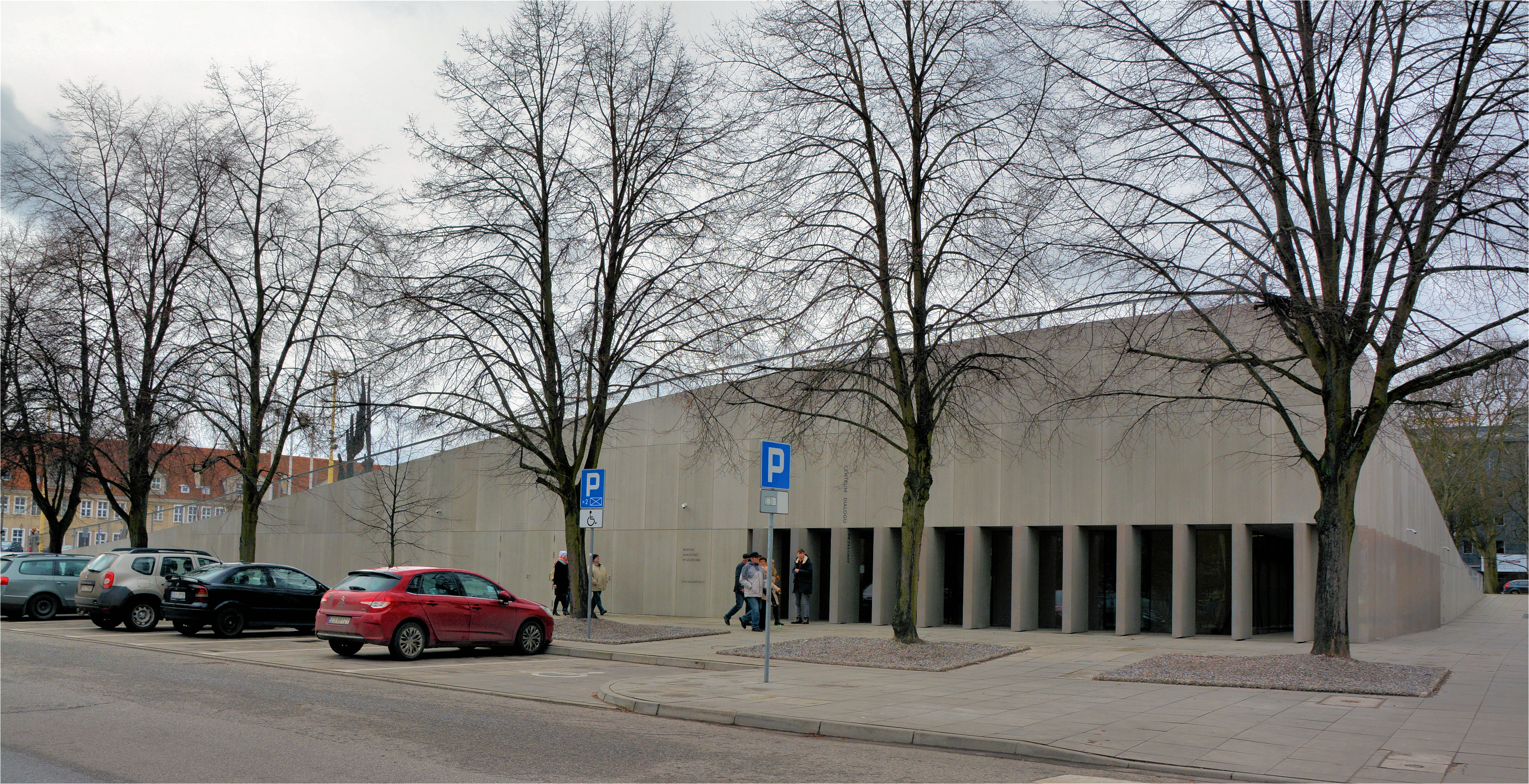
Dialogue Centre “Przełomy”, Szczecin (2016 winner)

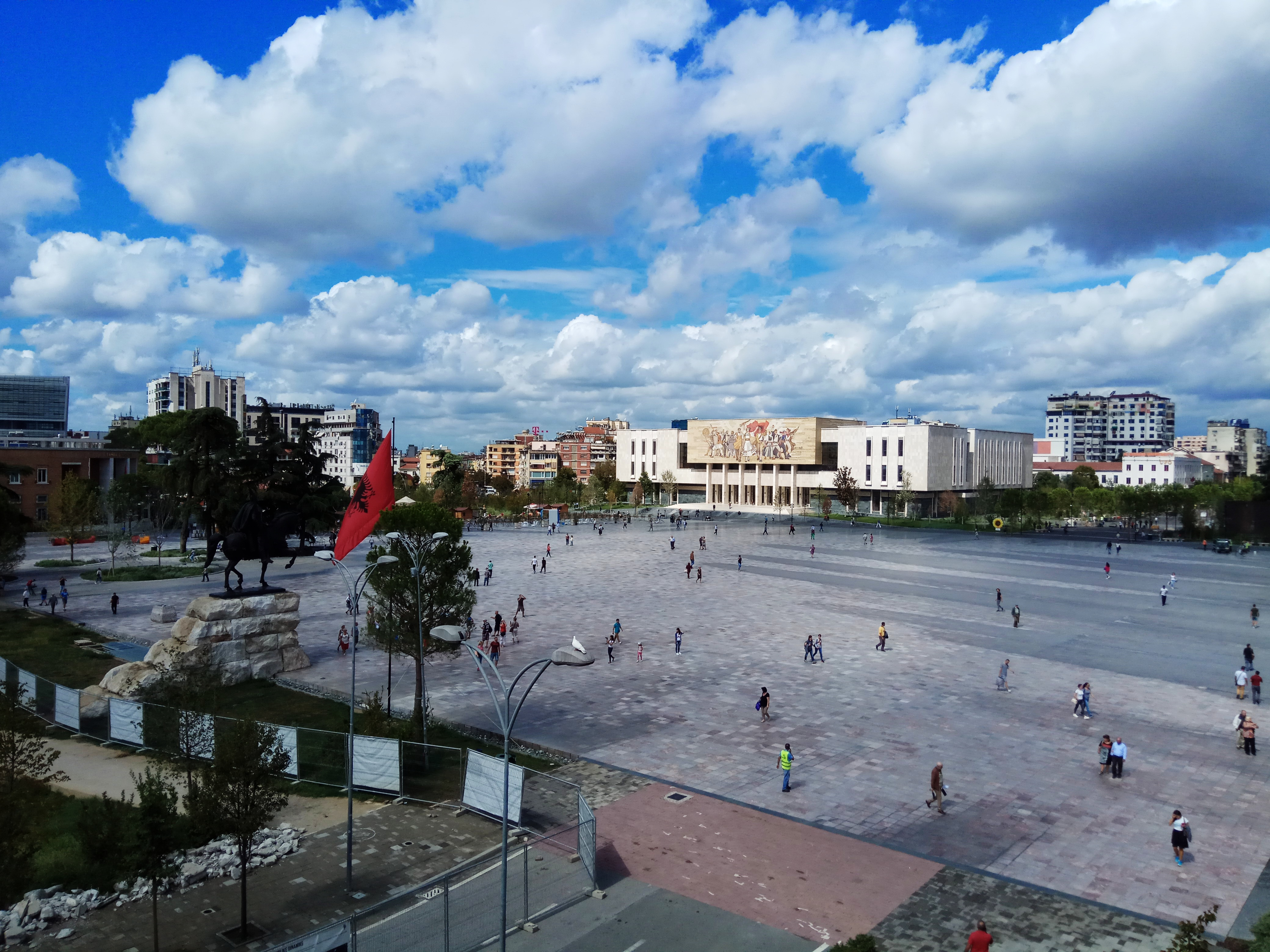
Skanderbeg Square, Tirana (2018 winner)

== List of award winners ==
Year	Project	Location
2000	Can Mulà new urban centre	Mollet del Vallès, Spain
2000	Smithfield Public Space	Dublin, Ireland
2002	New park and riverside walks	Zuera, Spain
2002	Stadtteilpark Reudnitz	Leipzig, Germany
2004	New system of lifts	Teruel, Spain
2004	Recovery of rubbish tip as a public park	Begues, Spain
2006	A8ernA, space below the motorway A8	Zaanstad, Netherlands
2006	Sea organ on a new marine parade	Zadar, Croatia
2008	Barking Town Square	London, United Kingdom
2010	Open-Air-Library	Magdeburg, Germany
2010	Oslo Opera House roof	Oslo, Norway
2012	Ljubljanica river banks renovation	Ljubljana, Slovenia
2012	Landscaping of Turó de la Rovira	Barcelona, Spain
2014	Renovation of the Old Port of Marseille	Marseille, France
2014	The braided valley park	Elche, Spain
2016	Recovery of the Irrigation System at the Thermal Orchards	Caldes de Montbui, Spain
2016	Dialogue Centre “Przełomy” at Solidarność Square	Szczecin, Poland
2018	Skanderbeg Square, renovation	Tirana, Albania
2022	Catharijnesingel restoration	Utrecht, Netherlands
2024	Park at the Warsaw Uprising Mound	Warsaw, Poland
