= Krommenie-Assendelft railway station =

Railway station in Zaanstad, the Netherlands

Krommenie-Assendelft
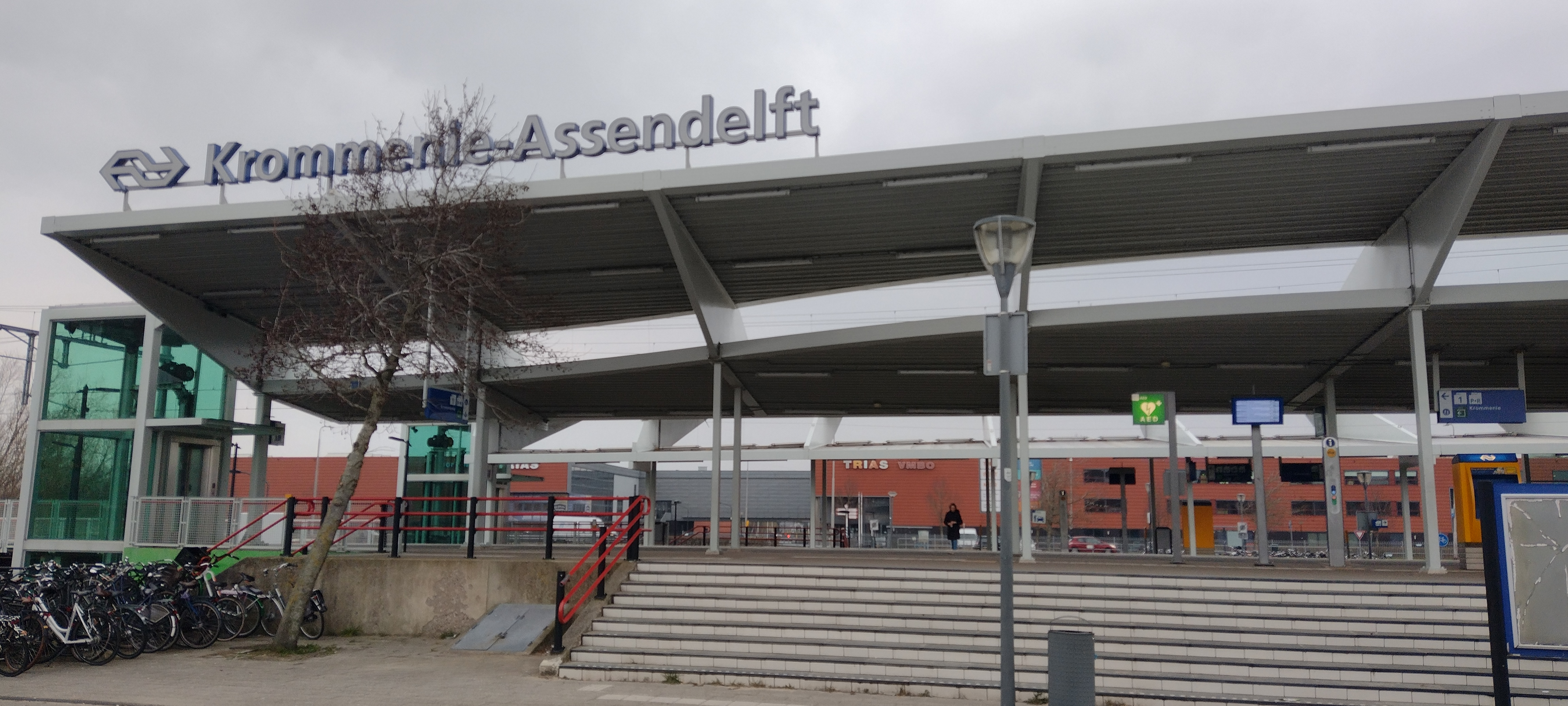
- The station in 2024

General information
- Location: Netherlands
- Coordinates: 52°29′39″N 4°45′42″E
- Line: Den Helder–Amsterdam railway

Services
Preceding station	Nederlandse Spoorwegen	Following station
Uitgeest Terminus	NS Sprinter 4000	Wormerveer towards Rotterdam Centraal
Uitgeest Terminus	NS Sprinter 7400 Peak hours only	Wormerveer towards Driebergen-Zeist
Location
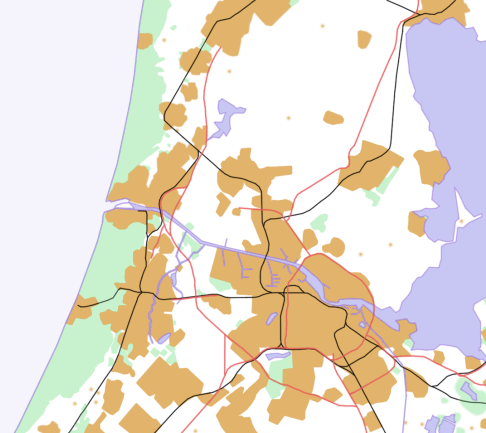
- Location within Northern Randstad Location within Netherlands

Krommenie-Assendelft is a railway station in Krommenie and Assendelft, Netherlands. The station lies on the Den Helder–Amsterdam railway, and was opened on 1 November 1869. The station had a goods yard, but no longer does. The station had remained unchanged since 1975 until 2006. The station began being moved in 2006, further west, closer to the Saendelft estate. This new station opened on 14 December 2008.

== Train services ==
The following train services call at Krommenie-Assendelft:

- 2× per hour local service (sprinter) Uitgeest – Zaandam – Amsterdam – Woerden – Rotterdam (all day, every day)
- 2× per hour local service (sprinter) Uitgeest – Zaandam – Amsterdam – Utrecht – Rhenen (only on weekdays until 8:00 PM)

== Bus services ==
Bus services serving the station are operated by Connexxion.

- 63 (Krommenie-Assendelft Station – Assendelft – Westzaan – Koog a/d Zaan – Zaandam – Zaandam Hospital – Zaandam Kogerveld – Zaandam Kalf)
- 69 (Krommenie-Assendelft Station – Krommenie – Wormerveer – Zaandam)
- 414 (Krommeniedijk – Krommenie – Station – Wormerveer – Wormer – Oost-Knollendam) Buurtbus service
- N61 (Krommenie-Assendelft Station – Wormerveer – Zaandijk – Koog a/d Zaan – Zaandam) Niteliner service
- N63 (Zaandam Town Centre – Zaandam Station – Koog a/d Zaan – Westzaan – Assendelft – Krommenie-Assendelft Station) Niteliner service
