= List of busiest railway stations in the Netherlands =

This is a list of the busiest railway stations in the Netherlands ranked by total boardings, alightings, and transfers.

Rank	Railway station	2014 (in millions)	Number of platform tracks	Municipality	Province	Photograph
1	Utrecht Centraal	64.3	16	Utrecht	Utrecht	
2	Amsterdam Centraal	59.1	11	Amsterdam	North Holland	
3	Rotterdam Centraal station	29.8	13	Rotterdam	South Holland	
4	Den Haag Centraal	27.8	10	The Hague	South Holland	
5	Leiden Centraal	26.1	6	Leiden	South Holland	
6	Schiphol Airport	25	6	Haarlemmermeer	North Holland	
7	Eindhoven Centraal	21.7	6	Eindhoven	North Brabant	
8	Amsterdam Sloterdijk	17.4	10	Amsterdam	North Holland	
9	Nijmegen	15.7	4	Nijmegen	Gelderland	
10	Amsterdam Zuid	15.4	4	Amsterdam	North Holland	
11	's-Hertogenbosch	15.3	5	's-Hertogenbosch	North Brabant	
12	Zwolle	14.8	9	Zwolle	Overijssel	
13	Amersfoort Centraal	14.4	6	Amersfoort	Utrecht	
14	Arnhem Centraal	14.0	8	Arnhem	Gelderland	
15	Haarlem	14.0	6	Haarlem	North Holland	
16	Den Haag Hollands Spoor	12.9	5	The Hague	South Holland	
17	Tilburg	11.7	4	Tilburg	North Brabant	
18	Delft	11.4	2	Delft	South Holland	
19	Breda	11.0	6	Breda	North Brabant	
20	Amsterdam Amstel	10.7	2	Amsterdam	North Holland	
21	Almere Centrum	8.7	4	Almere	Flevoland	
22	Hilversum	8.5	5	Hilversum	North Holland	
23	Dordrecht	8.4	7	Dordrecht	South Holland	
24	Bijlmer ArenA	7.8	6	Amsterdam	North Holland	
25	Zaandam	7.8	4	Zaanstad	North Holland	
26	Rotterdam Blaak	7.7	4	Rotterdam	South Holland	
27	Gouda	7.7	6	Gouda	South Holland	
28	Deventer	7.1	3	Deventer	Overijssel	
29	Alkmaar	7.1	5	Alkmaar	North Holland	
30	Groningen	6.9	5	Groningen	Groningen	
31	Schiedam Centrum	6.8	4	Schiedam	South Holland	
32	Rotterdam Alexander	6.4	2	Rotterdam	South Holland	
33	Ede-Wageningen	6.3	3	Ede	Gelderland	
34	Enschede	6.2	4	Enschede	Overijssel	
35	Maastricht	5.8	6	Maastricht	Limburg	
36	Hoofddorp	5.7	4	Haarlemmermeer	North Holland	
37	Apeldoorn	5.2	3	Apeldoorn	Gelderland	
38	Duivendrecht	5.1	4	Ouder-Amstel	North Holland	
39	Den Haag Laan van Nieuw Oost-Indië	5.0	4	The Hague	South Holland	
40	Amsterdam Lelylaan	4.9	2	Amsterdam	North Holland	
41	Hoorn	4.9	3	Hoorn	North Holland	
42	Hengelo	4.8	3	Hengelo	Overijssel	
43	Lelystad Centrum	4.7	4	Lelystad	Flevoland	
44	Roermond	4.7	3	Roermond	Limburg	
45	Sittard	4.4	4	Sittard	Limburg	
46	Woerden	4.4	4	Woerden	Utrecht	
47	Zutphen	4.2	3	Zutphen	Gelderland	
48	Amsterdam Muiderpoort	4.2	4	Amsterdam	North Holland	
49	Roosendaal	4.0	3	Roosendaal	North Brabant	
50	Almelo	3.8	3	Almelo	Overijssel	
51	Alphen aan den Rijn	3.641	3	Alphen aan den Rijn	South Holland	
52	Naarden-Bussum	3.478	2	Gooise Meren	North Holland	
53	Leeuwarden	3.464	6	Leeuwarden	Friesland	
54	Driebergen-Zeist	3.428	2	Utrechtse Heuvelrug	Utrecht	
55	Assen	3.391	3	Assen	Drenthe	
56	Weesp	3.366	4	Amsterdam	North Holland	
57	Culemborg	3.059	2	Culemborg	Gelderland	
58	Oss	2.997	2	Oss	North Brabant	
59	Utrecht Overvecht	2.817	3	Utrecht	Utrecht	
60	Heerhugowaard	2.766	3	Dijk en Waard	North Holland	
61	Weert	2.763	2	Weert	Limburg	
62	Rijswijk	2.729	4	Rijswijk	South Holland	
63	Houten	2.727	2	Houten	Utrecht	
64	Hilversum Sportpark	2.709	2	Hilversum	North Holland	
65	Goes	2.665	2	Goes	Zeeland	
66	Heerlen	2.587	4	Heerlen	Limburg	
67	Castricum	2.573	2	Castricum	North Holland	
68	Bergen op Zoom	2.560	2	Bergen op Zoom	North Brabant	
69	Almere Buiten	2.477	2	Almere	Flevoland	
70	Helmond	2.447	2	Helmond	North Brabant	
71	Tilburg Universiteit	2.390	3	Tilburg	North Brabant	
72	Almere Muziekwijk	2.378	2	Almere	Flevoland	
73	Amsterdam Rijwiel en Automobiel Industrie	2.357	4	Amsterdam	North Holland	
74	Heemstede-Aerdenhout	2.350	2	Heemstede	North Holland	
75	Rotterdam Lombardijen	2.298	4	Rotterdam	South Holland	
76	Boxtel	2.221	4	Boxtel	North Brabant	
77	Geldermalsen	2.176	2	West Betuwe	Gelderland	
78	Beverwijk	2.125	4	Beverwijk	North Holland	
79	Heerenveen	2.117	2	Heerenveen	Friesland	
80	Harderwijk	2.090	2	Harderwijk	Gelderland	
81	Zoetermeer	2.071	2	Zoetermeer	South Holland	
82	Krommenie-Assendelft	2.068	2	Zaanstad	North Holland	
83	Meppel	2.015	2	Meppel	Drenthe	
84	Schagen	2.001	3	Schagen	North Holland	
85	Zwijndrecht	1.998	4	Zwijndrecht	South Holland	
86	Hoorn Kersenboogerd	1.956	2	Hoorn	North Holland	
87	Uitgeest	1.938	3	Uitgeest	North Holland	
88	Barendrecht	1.888	4	Barendrecht	South Holland	
89	Best	1.864	4	Best	North Brabant	
90	Alkmaar Noord	1.849	2	Alkmaar	North Holland	
91	Breukelen	1.828	2	Stichtse Vecht	Utrecht	
92	Maarssen	1.767	2	Stichtse Vecht	Utrecht	
93	Delft Campus	1.754	2	Delft	South Holland	
94	Heiloo	1.747	2	Heiloo	North Holland	
95	Bilthoven	1.711	2	De Bilt	Utrecht	
96	Zandvoort aan Zee	1.710	2	Zandvoort	North Holland	
97	Middelburg	1.659	2	Middelburg	Zeeland	
98	Almere Oostvaarders	1.650	4	Almere	Flevoland	
99	Baarn	1.649	3	Baarn	Utrecht	
100	Deurne	1.641	3	Deurne	North Brabant	
101	Hoogeveen	1.581	2	Hoogeveen	Drenthe	
102	Kampen	1.578	1	Kampen	Overijssel	
103	Venlo	1.508	3	Venlo	Limburg	
104	Wijchen	1.476	3	Wijchen	Gelderland	
105	Den Helder	1.474	3	Den Helder	North Holland	
106	Wormerveer	1.435	4	Zaanstad	North Holland	
107	Bussum Zuid	1.422	2	Gooise Meren	North Holland	
108	Amsterdam Science Park	1.412	2	Amsterdam	North Holland	
109	Veenendaal-De Klomp	1.389	2	Ede	Gelderland	
110	Leiden Lammenschans	1.381	1	Leiden	South Holland	
111	Hilversum Media Park	1.380	2	Hilversum	North Holland	
112	Dieren	1.378	2	Rheden	Gelderland	
113	Almere Parkwijk	1.377	2	Almere	Flevoland	
114	Elst	1.373	3	Overbetuwe	Gelderland	
115	Houten Castellum	1.354	2	Houten	Utrecht	
116	Vleuten	1.318	2	Utrecht	Utrecht	
117	Tiel	1.310	2	Tiel	Gelderland	
118	Diemen Zuid	1.290	2	Diemen	North Holland	
119	Nijkerk	1.271	2	Nijkerk	Gelderland	
120	Nieuwerkerk aan den IJssel	1.249	2	Zuidplas	South Holland	
121	Voorhout	1.257	2	Teylingen	South Holland	
122	Zaltbommel	1.255	2	Zaltbommel	Gelderland	
123	Zoetermeer Oost	1.247	2	Zoetermeer	South Holland	
124	Dronten	1.232	2	Dronten	Flevoland	
125	Sassenheim	1.209	2	Sassenheim	South Holland	
126	Etten-Leur	1.189	2	Etten-Leur	North Brabant	
127	Haarlem Spaarnwoude	1.184	2	Haarlem	North Holland	
128	Diemen	1.155	2	Diemen	North Holland	
129	Den Haag Mariahoeve	1.151	4	The Hague	South Holland	
130	Utrecht Lunetten	1.146	2	Utrecht	Utrecht	
131	Steenwijk	1.132	2	Steenwijkerland	Overijssel	
132	Amsterdam Holendrecht	1.130	2	Amsterdam	North Holland	
133	Voorschoten	1.126	4	Voorschoten	South Holland	
134	De Vink	1.119	4	Voorschoten	South Holland	
135	Nijverdal	1.108	2	Hellendoorn	Overijssel	
136	Arnhem Presikhaaf	1.103	2	Arnhem	Gelderland	
137	Gouda Goverwelle	1.101	4	Gouda	South Holland	
138	Koog aan de Zaan	1.100	2	Zaanstad	North Holland	
139	Zaandijk Zaanse Schans	1.090	2	Zaanstad	North Holland	
140	Utrecht Terwijde	1.088	2	Utrecht	Utrecht	
141	Bodegraven	1.084	2	Bodegraven-Reeuwijk	South Holland	
142	Arnhem Zuid	1.067	2	Arnhem	Gelderland	
143	Rotterdam Zuid	1.060	4	Rotterdam	South Holland	
144	Ermelo	1.051	2	Ermelo	Gelderland	
145	Vlissingen	1.043	3	Vlissingen	Zeeland	
146	Overveen	1.030	2	Bloemendaal	North Holland	
147	Nunspeet	1.018	2	Nunspeet	Gelderland	
148	Vlaardingen Oost	1.015	2	Vlissingen	South Holland	
149	Purmerend	1.011	2	Purmerend	North Holland	
150	Nieuw-Vennep	1.007	2	Haarlemmermeer	North Holland	

== See also ==
- Eijsden railway station (the least busy railway station in the Netherlands)
