= 2023 Voorschoten train crash =

Rail accident in South Holland, Netherlands

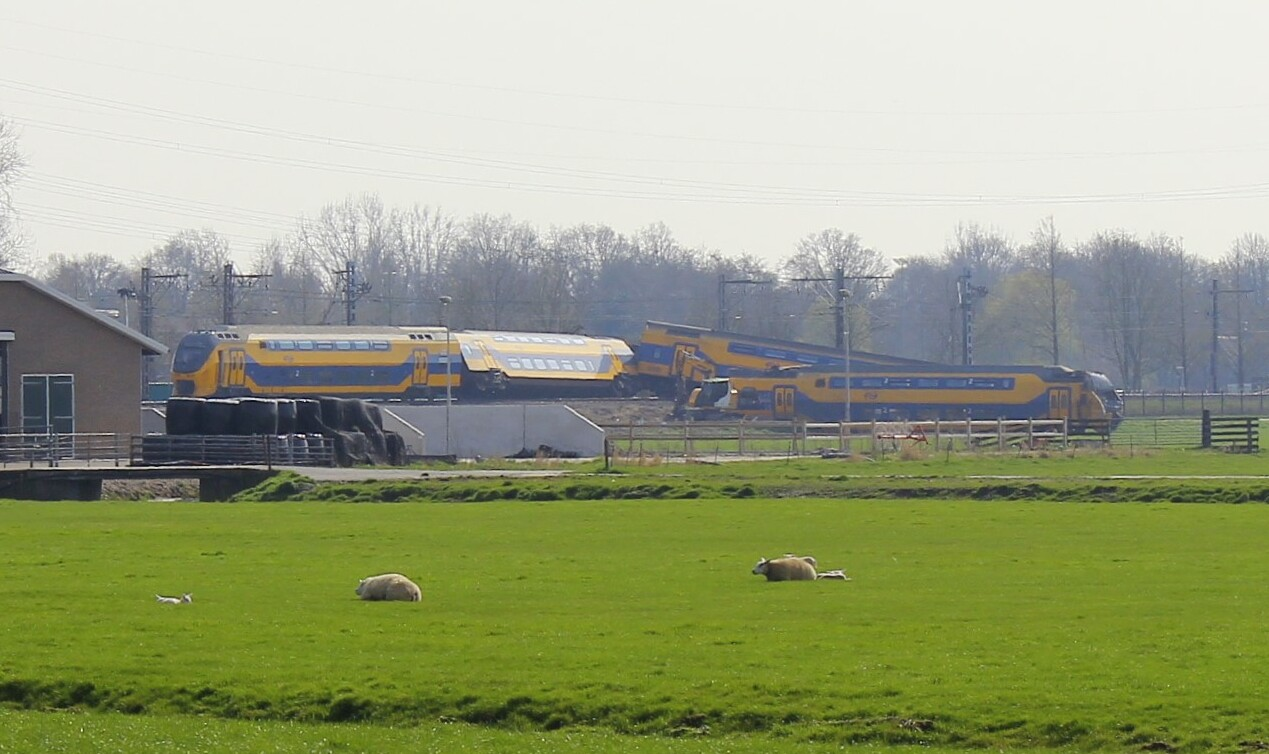
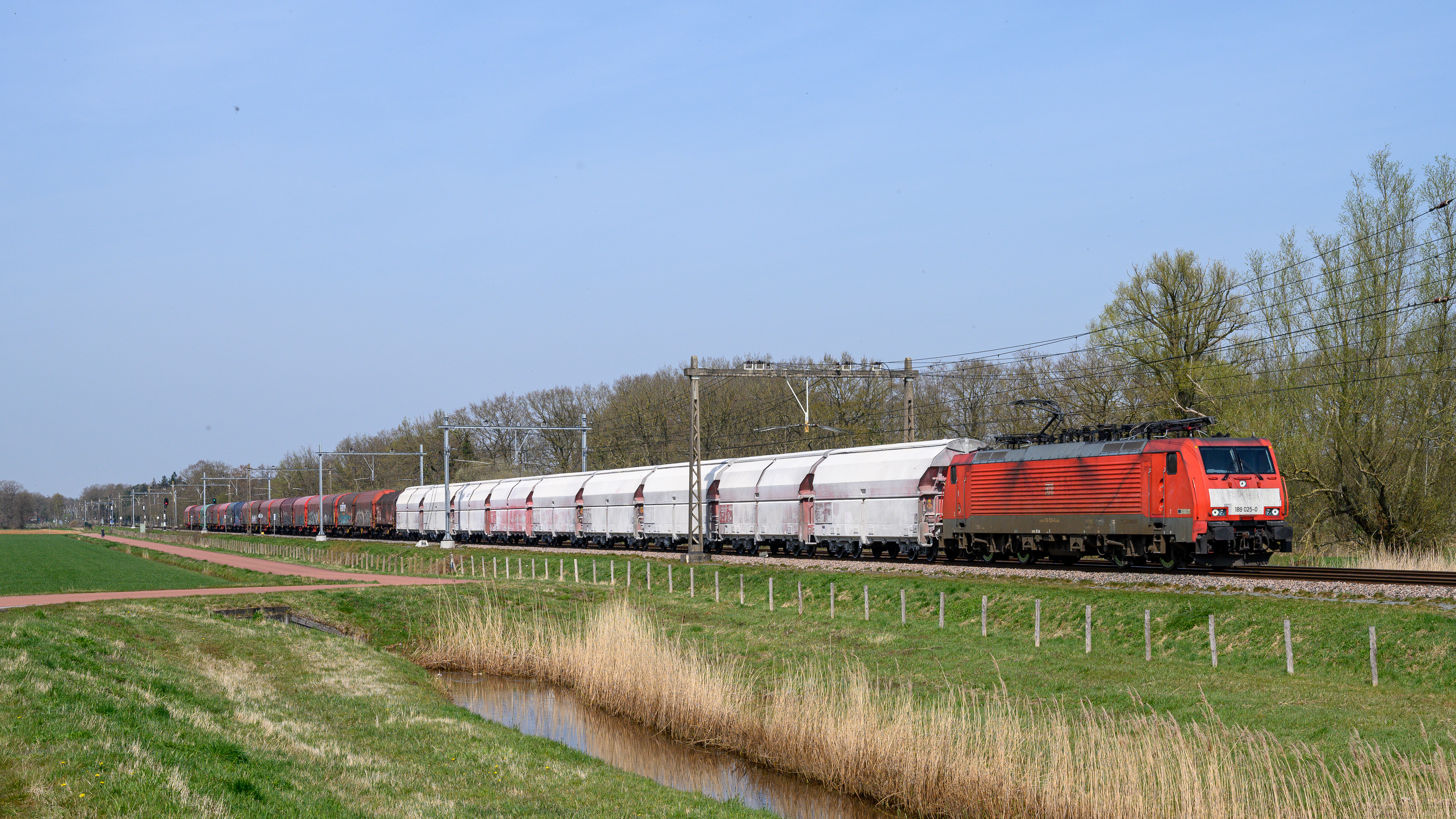
- The wrecked NS VIRM 9405, photographed the day after the accident. A freight train hauled by a DBAG Class 189 locomotive. The formation of the train is similar to that of the train involved in the accident.

- Voorschoten, South Holland

Details
- Date: 4 April 2023; 03:25 CEST (01:25 UTC)
- Location: Voorschoten
- Coordinates: 52.1228°N 4.4291°E
- Country: Netherlands
- Line: Amsterdam–Haarlem–Rotterdam railway
- Operator: Nederlandse Spoorwegen (NS) (passenger); DB Cargo (freight)
- Incident type: Two collisions; derailment of one train
- Cause: Line obstructed

Statistics
- Trains: 2
- Passengers: 50
- Crew: 4
- Deaths: 1
- Injured: 30

On 4 April 2023, a freight train and a passenger train collided with construction equipment obstructing the line at Voorschoten, South Holland, Netherlands. The passenger train was derailed. The operator of the crane was killed and 30 people were injured, 19 of whom were hospitalized.

== Crash ==
At 03:25 CEST (01:25 UTC), a freight train, operated by DB Cargo and hauled by DBAG Class 189 locomotive number 189 054, collided with a road–rail crane that was obstructing the line at Voorschoten, South Holland, Netherlands, which connects Leiden Centraal with Den Haag Centraal and Den Haag Hollands Spoor, all located on the Amsterdam–Haarlem–Rotterdam railway. The locomotive hauling the freight train was severely damaged, but was not derailed. The crane landed in the path of, and was then run into by, a passenger train, operated by NS VIRM unit 9405. There was between one and five minutes between the two collisions. The passenger train was travelling at 137 kilometres per hour (85 mph) when it collided with the crane. All four vehicles of the passenger train were derailed. Two of the four tracks through Voorschoten had been closed for investigation and engineering work to take place.

A small fire broke out in the rearmost carriage of the passenger train, but it was quickly extinguished. The passenger train was travelling from Leiden to Den Haag, South Holland. A "Code 50" alert was issued, as more than 50 people were presumably injured. A GRIP 3 situation was also declared, indicating an incident that threatens the well-being of a large number of people in a single municipality. The driver of the freight train was reported to have survived uninjured. The driver of the passenger train survived with several broken bones. Two conductors on the passenger train were injured.

On 5 April 2023, ProRail CEO John Voppen stated that the freight train was likely to have been on the correct track. On 7 April, it was reported that the crane had arrived at the site ahead of schedule. Permission was requested at 03:23 for traffic to be stopped to allow the crane to be placed on track. The crane operator was told to wait for 10 minutes before this would be possible. By 03:29, power had been lost to the overhead catenary at Voorschoten.

== Victims ==
The operator of the crane was killed — an employee of Royal BAM Group, the company who owned the crane. An additional 30 people were injured, 15 of whom were "serious". Emergency services attended the scene. Nineteen of the wounded were taken to hospital. Ten of them had been discharged by midday. Three people were sent to intensive care — two at Leiden University Medical Center and one at HMC Westeinde. Five people were still hospitalized on 7 April, with one in intensive care.

== Aftermath ==
The line was initially expected to remain closed until at least 16:00 on 4 April 2023. It was later announced that the line would not reopen that day. Leiden Centraal station was closed on 4 April 2023 due to overcrowding as a result of the crash. Buses replaced trains between Den Haag Centraal, Den Haag Laan van NOI, Den Haag Mariahoeve, Voorschoten, De Vink, Leiden Centraal, Sassenheim, Nieuw-Vennep and Hoofddorp.

The freight train had been removed from Voorschoten by 6 April. The four carriages of the VIRM were removed on 11 April. The rear two carriages left for Amersfoort by rail, and the front two carriages were to be taken by road. The line was reopened on 20 April 2023.

== Investigations ==
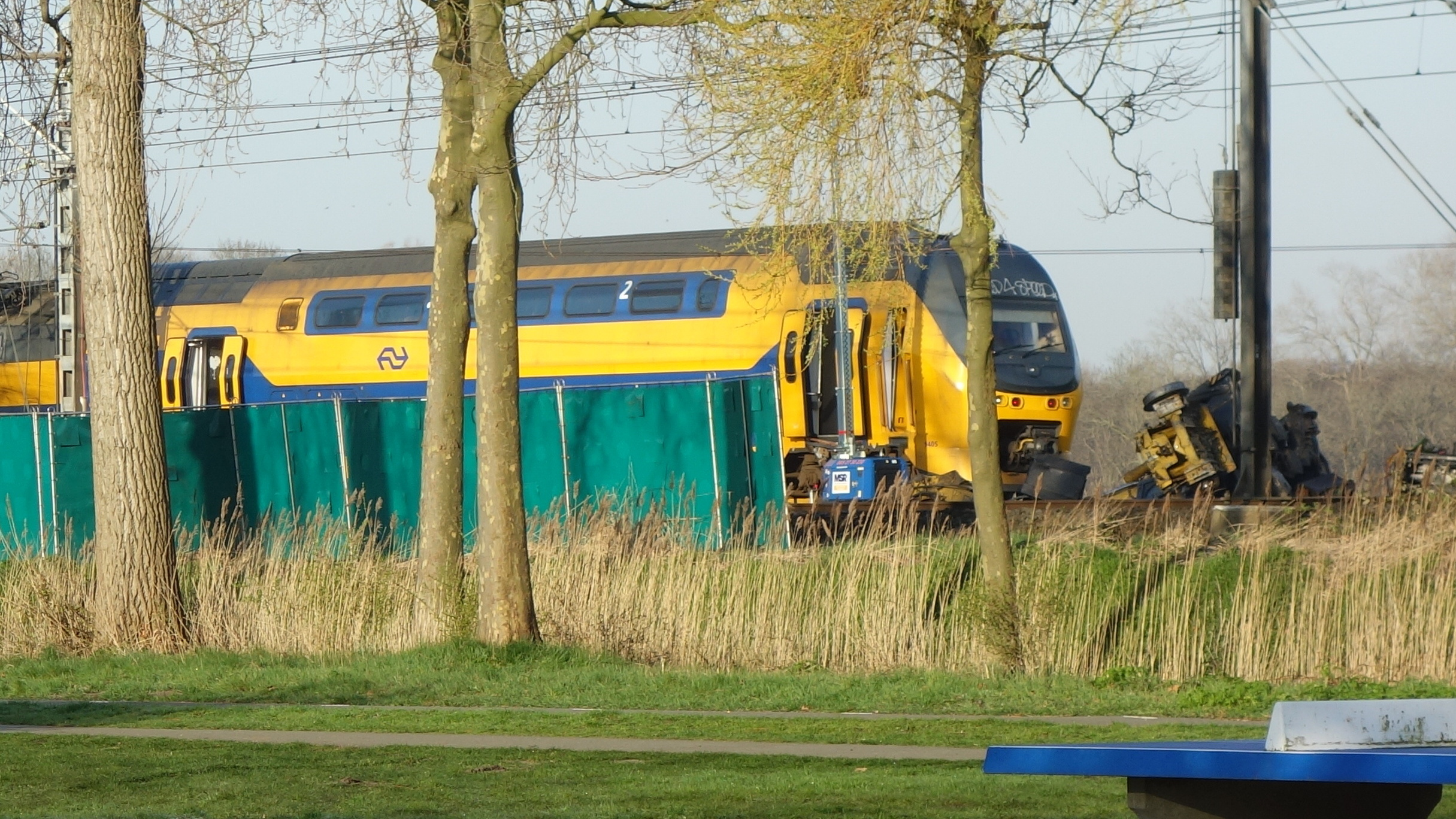
The rear carriage of the passenger train and the destroyed road-rail crane operated by Royal BAM Group

The Dutch Safety Board (OVV) opened an investigation into the crash. Their investigation will focus on whether the crane was being used on the correct track, and whether the freight and passenger trains were on lines that should have been closed or not. The Dutch Police opened a criminal investigation into the crash. The Human Environment and Transport Inspectorate is coordinating investigations with the OVV, police, Labour Inspectorate, ProRail, DB Cargo, NS, and Royal BAM Group.

The OVV released their conclusions of the investigation into the crash on 15 May 2024. The OVV said that the Dutch government focused too much on keeping lines open above the safety of maintenance crews. Although no definitive cause was established, it was noted that at Voorschoten maintenance workers had to cross railway lines open to traffic to reach their worksite.
