= Leiden Centraal railway station =

Railway station in Leiden, Netherlands

Leiden Centraal
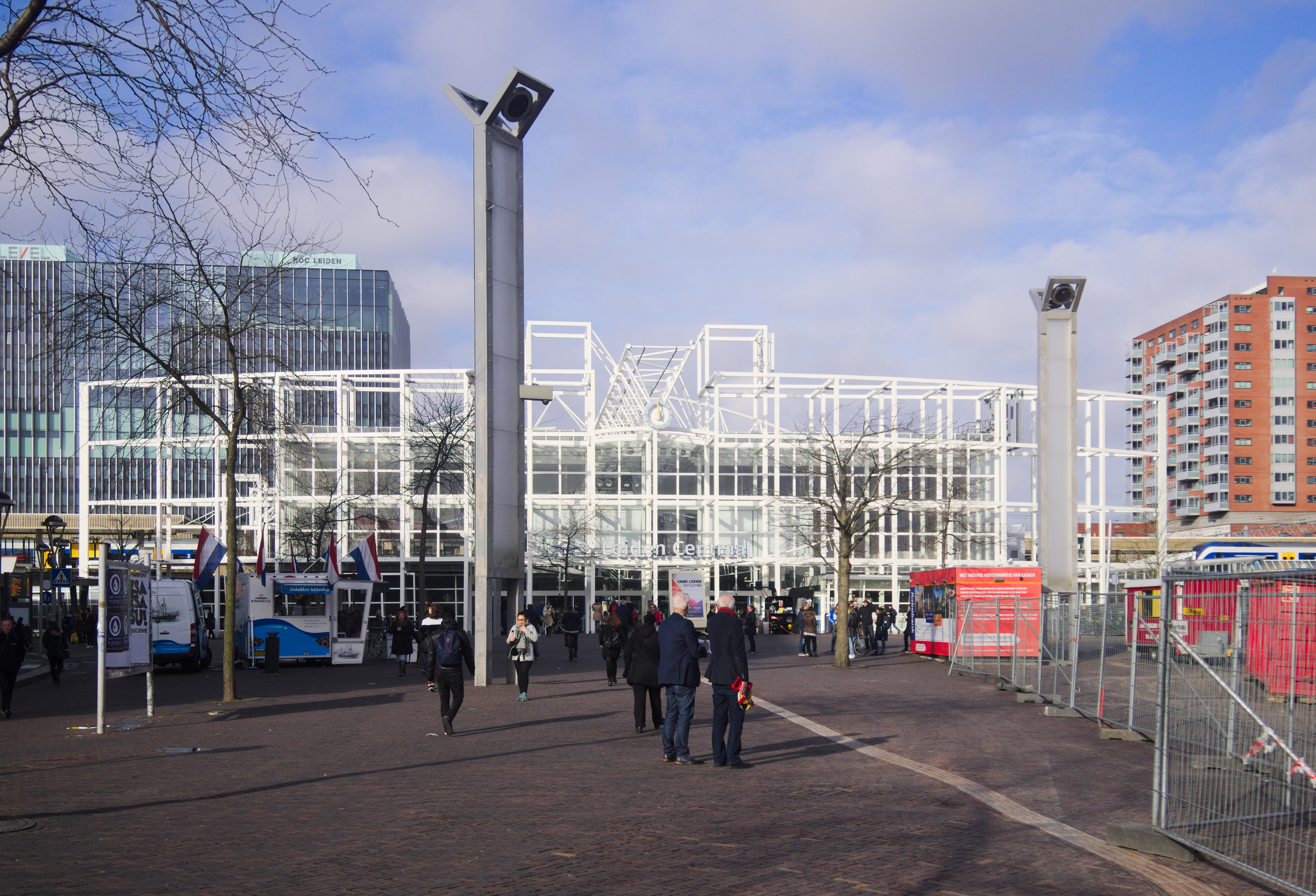
- Leiden Centraal railway station

General information
- Location: Leiden, South Holland, Netherlands
- Coordinates: 52°09′59″N 4°28′56″E
- Owner: Nederlandse Spoorwegen
- Lines: Amsterdam–Rotterdam railway Weesp–Leiden railway Woerden–Leiden railway
- Platforms: 6
- Tracks: 10
- Connections: Qbuzz: 1, 2, 3, 4, 9, 14, 20, 21, 22, 23, 30, 31, 37, 38, 50, 55, 56, 169, 182, 183, 187, 250, 365, 366, 400, 401, 410, 854; EBS: 43, 45

History
- Opened: 17 August 1842; 184 years ago
Services
Preceding station	Nederlandse Spoorwegen	Following station
Den Haag Hollands Spoor towards Rotterdam Centraal	NS Nachtnet 1400 Night train Not on Tues, Wed	Schiphol Airport towards Utrecht Centraal
Den Haag Hollands Spoor towards Rotterdam Centraal	NS Nachtnet 1400 Night train Tuesday only	Amsterdam Centraal towards Utrecht Centraal
Den Haag Centraal Terminus	NS Intercity 2100	Heemstede-Aerdenhout towards Amsterdam Centraal
Den Haag Laan van NOI towards Vlissingen	NS Intercity 2200	Heemstede-Aerdenhout towards Amsterdam Centraal
Den Haag Laan van NOI towards Vlissingen	NS Intercity 2300 Mon-Fri until 20:00	Heemstede-Aerdenhout towards Amsterdam Centraal
Den Haag Centraal Terminus	NS Intercity 3100	Schiphol Airport towards Nijmegen
Den Haag Laan van NOI towards Rotterdam Centraal	NS Intercity 3200 Mon-Thurs before 19:00	Schiphol Airport towards Arnhem Centraal
Den Haag Laan van NOI towards Dordrecht	NS Intercity 3500	Schiphol Airport towards Venlo
Den Haag HS towards Rotterdam Centraal	NS Nachtnet 11400 Wednesday Night only	Schiphol Airport towards Utrecht Centraal
Terminus	NS Nachtnet 11450 Tuesday Night only	Schiphol Airport towards Amsterdam Bijlmer ArenA
De Vink towards Den Haag Centraal	NS Sprinter 4300	Sassenheim towards Lelystad Centrum
Terminus	NS Sprinter 5700 Weekdays before 20:30	Sassenheim towards Utrecht Centraal
De Vink towards Den Haag Centraal	NS Sprinter 6300	Voorhout towards Haarlem
Leiden Lammenschans towards Tiel	NS Sprinter 6700 After 18:00 and Fri-Sun	Terminus
Leiden Lammenschans towards 's-Hertogenbosch	NS Sprinter 8800 Mon-Thur until 18:00	Terminus
Leiden Lammenschans towards Utrecht Centraal	NS Sprinter 8900 Peak only	Terminus
Location
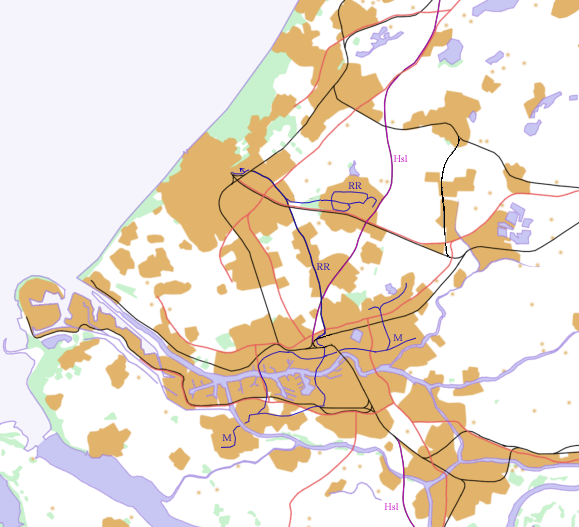
- Location within Southwest Randstad Location within Netherlands

Leiden Centraal is the main railway station in Leiden, a university city in the Netherlands. In 2019, it was the nation's sixth-busiest station in terms of passenger numbers, with 82,689 daily passengers. The station is an important transit hub for approximately 35,000 non-resident higher education students, studying in the city, and for Leiden's surrounding area, including the seaside town of Katwijk.

== History ==
=== Leiden I: Conrad and Outshoorn's Station ===
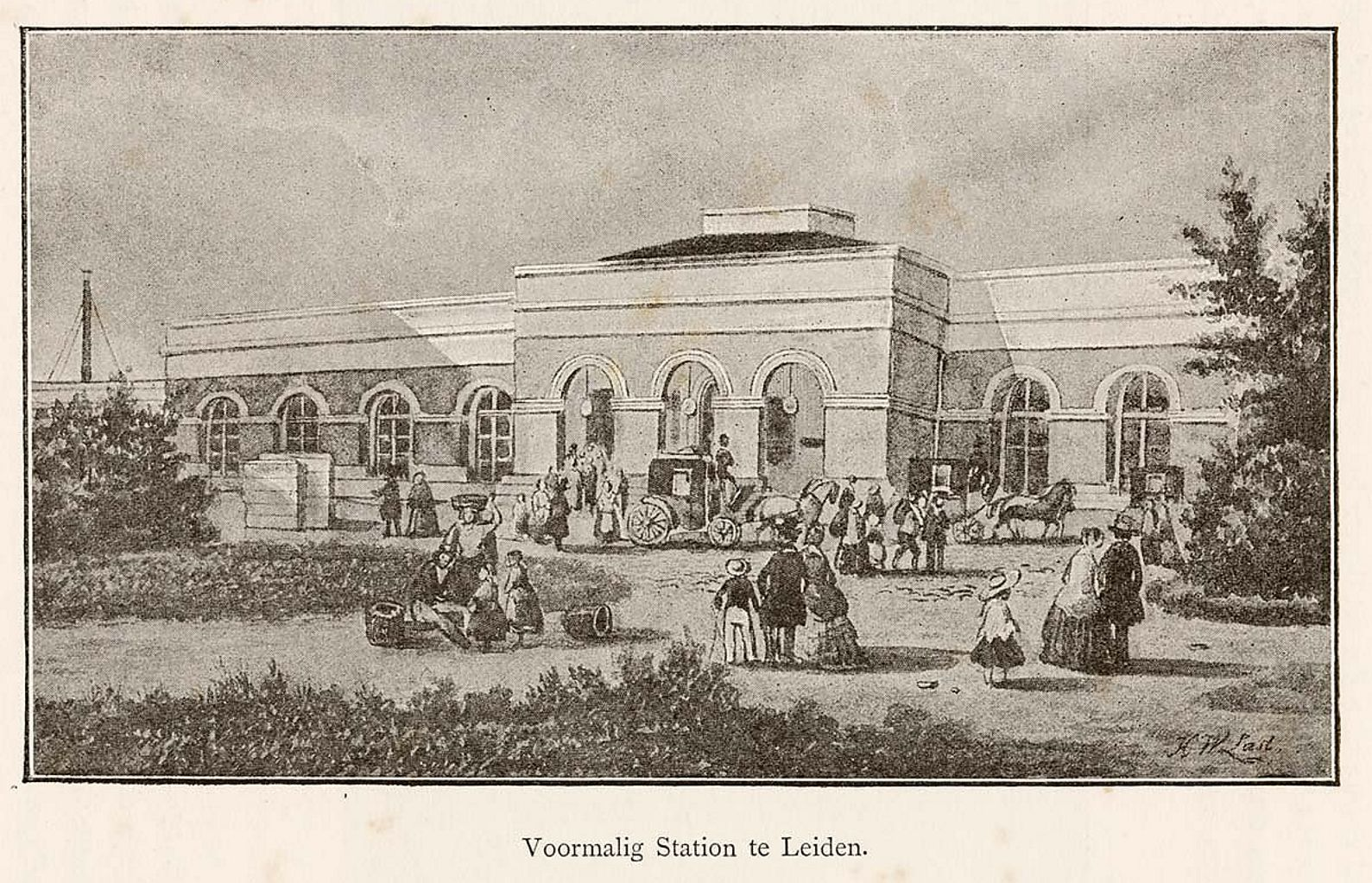
The first permanent station building in Leiden, 1843

Leiden Station opened on 17 August 1842 as the southern terminus of the first expansion of the Old Line (Dutch: Oude Lijn) from Haarlem, operated by the Hollandsche IJzeren Spoorweg-Maatschappij (HIJSM). Because there was some delay in extending the line from the railroad bridge over the towing canal to Haarlem, a makeshift structure was constructed on the east side of the railroad bridge, which was the departure point for the first train from Leiden to Amsterdam.

A permanent building could be opened on 15 June 1843. This station was a modest, single-story affair and had been designed by railway engineers Frederik Willem Conrad and Cornelis Outshoorn, who were also responsible for Haarlem's first station. It consisted of a small hall and two wings, which housed offices and services. At the time, the station site was part of the neighboring village of Oegstgeest rather than Leiden itself.

=== Leiden II: Margadant and Sanders' Station ===
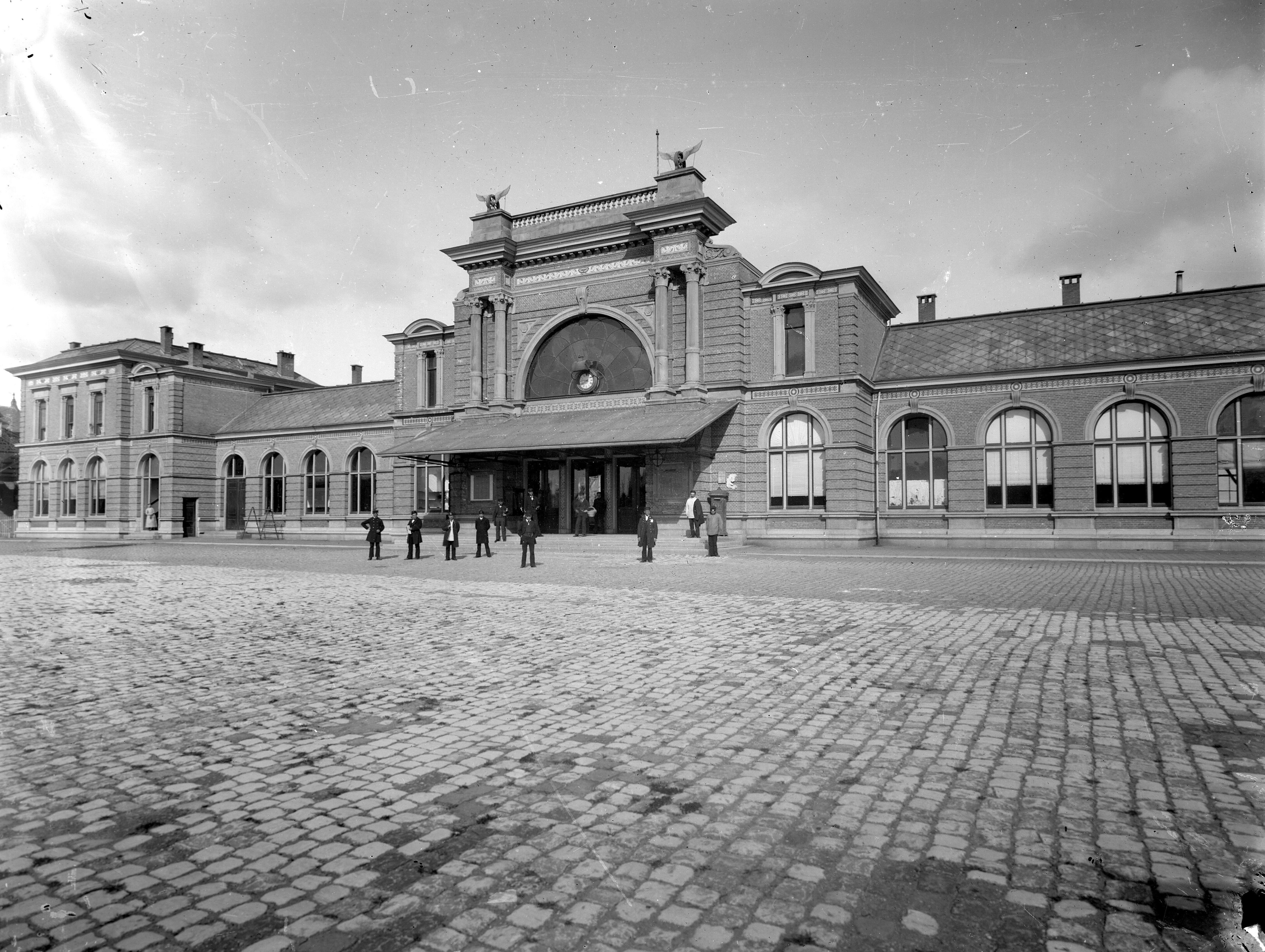
Leiden Station at the end of the 19th century

Like most of its generation, this original station soon proved to be far too small to cope with the growth of the railways. Its replacement, finished in 1879, came to serve not only the HIJSM line from Amsterdam to Rotterdam, but also the recently completed connection to Woerden, for which Leiden became the western terminus; for this reason it was officially referred to as a "shared station" (gemeenschappelijk station). The line to Woerden was operated by the competing Nederlandsche Rhijnspoorweg-Maatschappij and allowed passengers to travel directly to Utrecht.

A basic design was produced by Dirk Margadant, which was then completed by Theodor Sanders. This station took inspiration from Berlin's Lehrter Bahnhof, with which it shared a triumphal arch central window flanked by double columns in the façade. Margadant would return to this idea in a more stylized form in his later design for the (still extant) railway station in Haarlem (1908).

While the new station's design was initially well-regarded, its eclectic style increasingly raised criticism. More problematically, the ground-level crossings of the busy railway line caused increasing traffic and safety problems as the years went by. Moreover, goods facilities were located at the front of the station and further limited space and access. This situation was made worse after the Blauwe Tram ("blue tram") linking Leiden to Scheveningen was connected to the station in 1924. On 11 December 1944, the station area was subjected to a bombing raid by the RAF aimed at nearby V-2 rocket installations. The building station itself was damaged as well, particularly the central arch window. Although the damage was repaired after the war, the window was restored in a much simplified form.

=== Leiden III: Schelling's Station ===
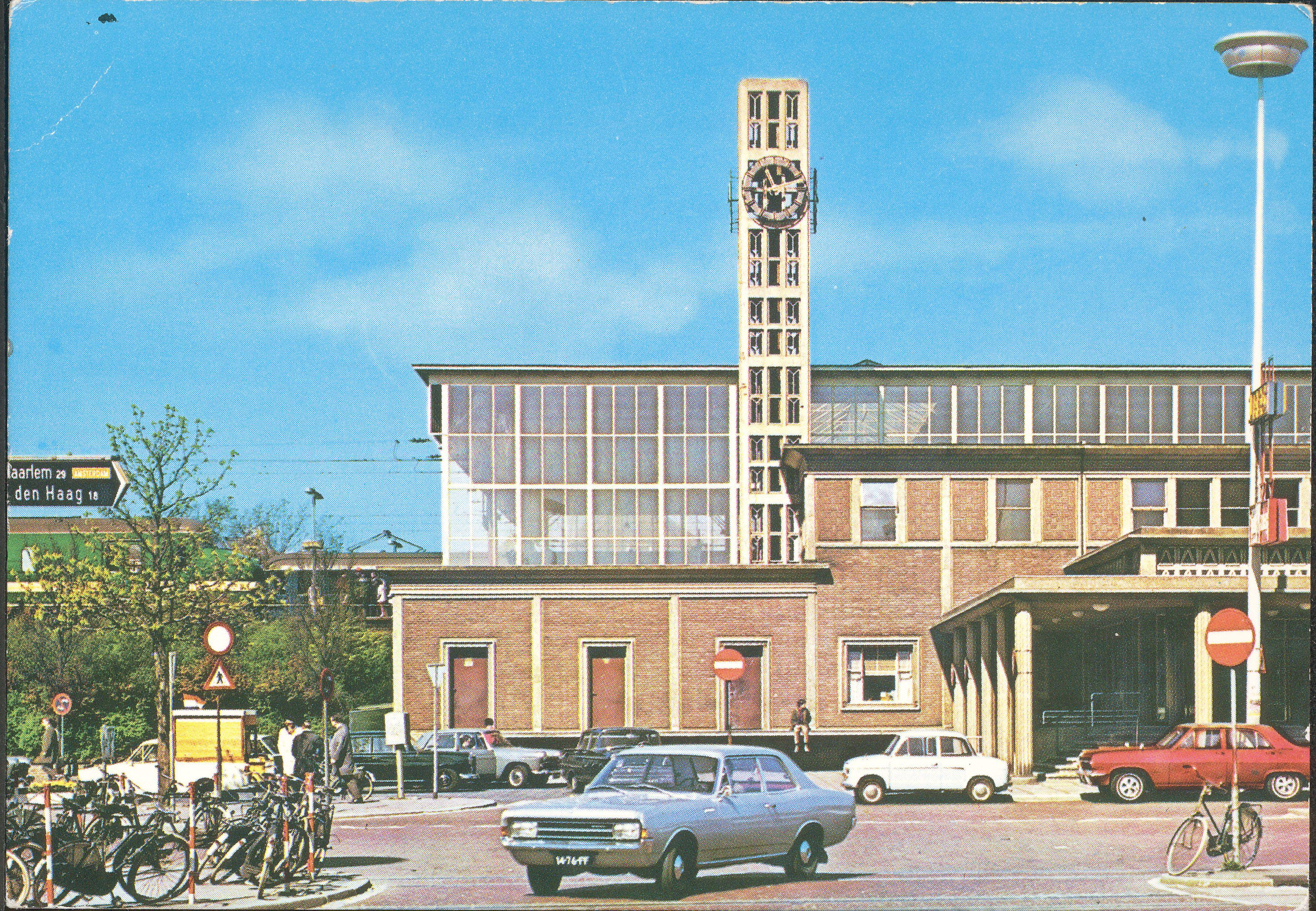
Leiden Station, around 1970.

These traffic issues led to the decision to elevate the railway lines, which necessitated reconstructing the station. An entirely new station building was opened in August 1953. This station was designed by Herman Schelling, who had gained some renown as the architect of Amsterdam's Muiderpoort station. Stylistically, it matched his other post-war designs such as those in Enschede and Hengelo. While the end of the traffic problems around the station was welcomed, Schelling's design itself was not received favorably. Its rather austere style contrasted markedly with the opulent forms of its predecessor and was regarded as unbefitting Leiden's status as the predominant university city in the country. In addition, increasing numbers of passengers soon caused the somewhat undersized building – with public areas not much larger than those of its predecessor – to become overcrowded.

Until 1976, Leiden station was a stop on the Oude Lijn where passengers could only change trains to the Woerden - Leiden line. However, after new connecting tracks were added in 1976 at Den Haag Laan van NOI Station, travelers could now connect to Den Haag Centraal Station, which had opened in 1973. This change made Leiden a much busier transfer point and further increased pressure on the small station. Now, passengers could choose to travel to Den Haag HS Station – like before – or to Den Haag Centraal Station, which is closer to the city center and has far more local transport options, including a big bus and tram hub.

The addition of the Schiphollijn in 1981 further increasing the station's capacity issues. Leiden now became an important transit hub to the nation's main airport. Because of the heavy traffic on the Schiphol line, the Leiden to The Hague section was running into delays, so it was expanded to four tracks. This required extending the station, which was done in 1995. However, due to its narrow platforms and the continued increase in passenger numbers, the decision was taken to replace the station with a new complex.

=== Leiden IV: Reijnders' Station ===
The fourth, and current, station was designed by NS architect Harry Reijnders and completed in 1996. Consisting of a white lattice structure, a curved, shell-like entrance leads into a ticketing hall lined with shops and catering facilities.

The new building officially opened on May 4, 1996. The station's structure was based on the Rail 21 plan, which allowed high-speed trains to pass through the middle of the station at 160 km/h. At first, there was a big, separate area for ticket sales at the main entrance. However, after ticket machines had been added to the station hall, this area became mostly unnecessary; it was also difficult to heat adequately due to its high ceiling. Initially, the floor had a bright blue and white finish. Problems with passengers slipping required that the floor be replaced with standard tiling.

Since the renovation, the station features a platform with two terminal tracks (Tracks 1 and 2), and two island platforms; one containing Tracks 4 and 5 on the city side, and one containing Tracks 8 and 9 on the western side, along with four tracks (3, 6, 7, and 10) not linked to a platform. The terminus platform was built around 1976; this change allowed trains to Alphen aan de Rijn and Utrecht to stop there, freeing up space on the island platforms for new services from Den Haag Centraal and eventually Schiphol. During renovations in 1996, the seaside island platform was moved westward, which made room to widen the central track, allowing international trains like the Thalys and the Benelux train to pass through since they hadn’t stopped here since 1998. The two island platforms were also extended so that two trains can stand one behind the other and be managed separately, thanks to crossover switches connecting them to the nearby tracks. As a result, some trains stop on the north side of the station, outside the protective canopy, away from the stairs, elevators, and main station hall.

=== Renaming ===
On 22 May 1997, Leiden Station was renamed Leiden Centraal (Leiden Central) in recognition of the station's significance as the nation's fifth busiest.

=== Smart card era ===
In 2007, Leiden Centraal was renovated in accordance with the introduction of the OV-chipkaart, which created a nationwide smart card fare system. To implement the OV-chipkaart, ticket barriers were installed, separating the station into a paid and unpaid area. This caused some controversy because the building was also a popular and convenient walking route to the area at the station's rear, which contains the Leiden University Medical Center. The platforms, waiting area, and several shops comprise the paid area, while the rest of the station (including ticket machines and other shops) is classified as unpaid. As of 2017 the barriers are no longer open, as the new ticket system is now mandatory.

== Meetings at the station ==
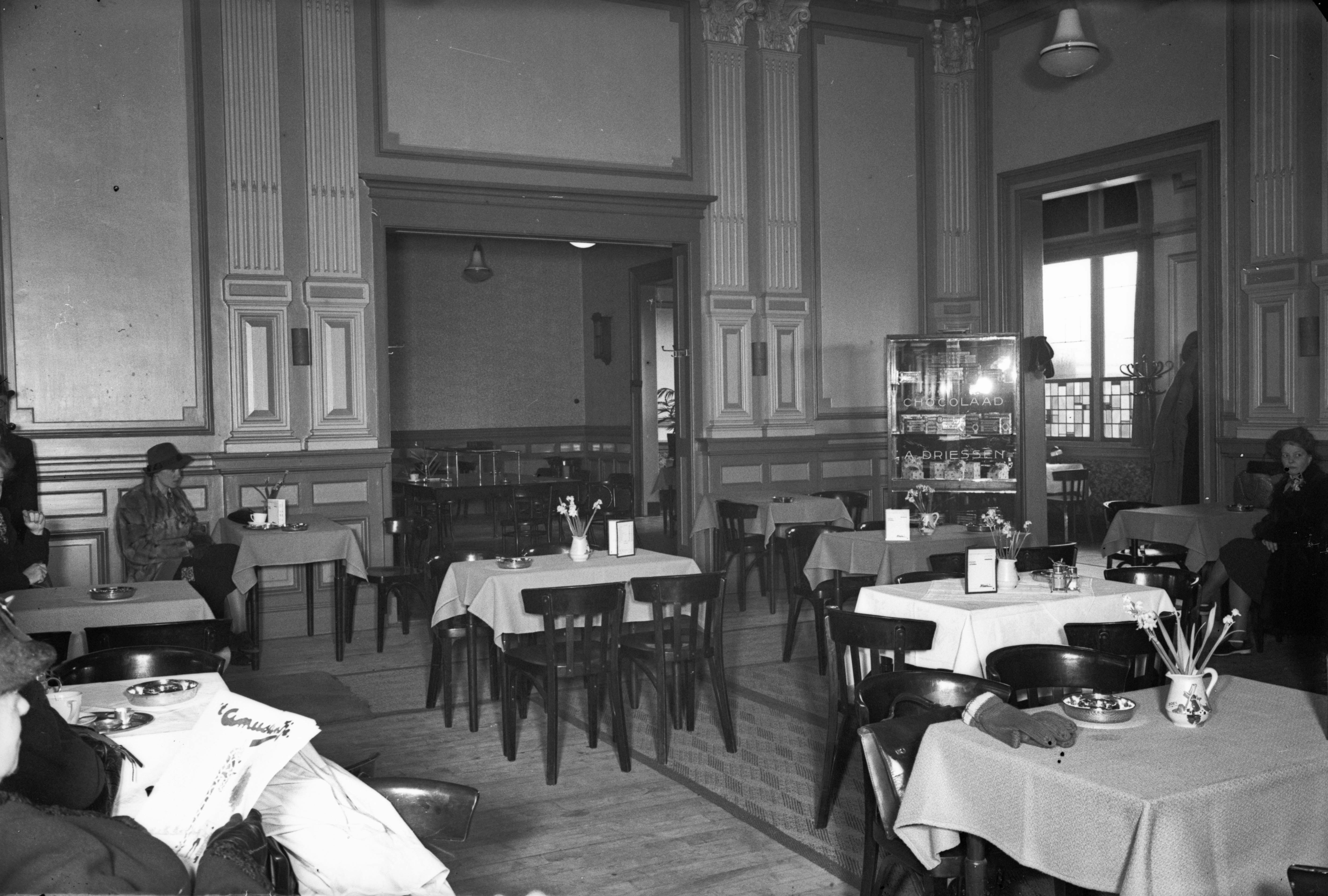
First and Second-class waiting room at Leiden, 1941

In 1910, Sigmund Freud, the father of Psychoanalysis, and conductor and composer Gustav Mahler met at Leiden station. It was also the site where the Leiden physicist Paul Ehrenfest picked up various friends and colleagues such as Albert Einstein, Niels Bohr and J. Robert Oppenheimer.

== Accidents and incidents ==
- On 28 November 2011, a Sprinter collided with another, stationary Sprinter. Three passengers were injured.

== Train services ==
As of 13 December 2020, the following train services call at this station:

- 1x per hour night train (nachtnet) service Rotterdam - The Hague - Amsterdam - Utrecht
- 2x per hour Intercity service The Hague - Leiden - Schiphol - Amsterdam Zuid - Amsterdam Bijlmer ArenA - Utrecht - Ede Wageningen - Arnhem - Nijmegen
- 2x per hour Intercity service Amsterdam - Haarlem - Leiden - The Hague (Not after 22.00)
- 2x per hour Intercity service Amsterdam - Haarlem - Leiden - The Hague - Rotterdam - Dordrecht - Roosendaal - Vlissingen
- 2x per hour Intercity service Dordrecht - Rotterdam - The Hague - Leiden - Schiphol - Utrecht - 's Hertogenbosch - Eindhoven - Venlo
- 2x per hour Intercity service Rotterdam - The Hague - Leiden - Schiphol - Utrecht - Ede Wageningen - Arnhem
- 2x per hour local service (Sprinter) Leiden - Alphen aan den Rijn - Utrecht - Houten - Geldermalsen - 's Hertogenbosch (Mon-Thur until 18:00)
- 2x per hour local service (Sprinter) Leiden - Alphen aan den Rijn - Utrecht - Houten - Geldermalsen - Tiel (Monday-Thursday after 18:00, fridays and weekends)
- 2x per hour local service (Sprinter) Utrecht - Hilversum - Naarden-Bussum - Weesp - Amsterdam Zuid - Schiphol - Hoofdorp (- Leiden) (After 20.00 and on weekends not to Leiden)
- 2x per hour local service (Sprinter) The Hague - Leiden - Schiphol - Amsterdam Zuid - Weesp - Almere - Lelystad
- 2x per hour local service (Sprinter) (The Hague -) Leiden - Haarlem (After 20.00 not to The Hague)
- 2x per hour local service (Sprinter) Leiden - Alphen aan den Rijn - Utrecht (only in rushhours and an hour before and after rushhours)

== Bus services ==
For the bus services the responsible companies are Qbuzz and EBS.

No.	Route	Via
City service Leiden
1	Station De Vink - Leiderdorp, Leyhof	Stevenshof, Centraal Station, Station Lammenschans
2	Station De Vink - Leiderdorp, Oranjewijk	Stevenshof, Centraal Station, Breestraat, Station Lammenschans, Leiderdorp, Rijnland Ziekenhuis
3	Leiderdorp, Leyhof - Leiden, Merenwijk	Buitenhof, Rietschans, De Kooi, De Waard, Breestraat, Centraal Station, LUMC, Groenoord
4	Station De Vink - Leiden, Merenwijk	Fortuinwijk, Station Lammenschans, Centraal Station, LUMC, Groenoord
9	Leiden, Centraal Station - Bio Science Park	
14	Station De Vink - Leiden, Centraal Station	Breestraat, Tuinstadwijk
Around Leiden
20	Leiden, Centraal Station - Noordwijk, Vuurtorenplein	Oegstgeest, Rijnsburg
21	Leiden, Centraal Station - Noordwijk, Vuurtorenplein	Oegstgeest, Rijnsburg
22	Leiden, Centraal Station - Nieuw-Vennep, Station	Oegstgeest, Valkenburg, Katwijk aan den Rijn, Voorhout, Noordwijk, Noordwijkerhout, De Zilk, Hillegom, Station, Beinsdorp
23	Leiden, Centraal Station - Noordwijk, Picképlein	Bio Science Park, N206, Valkenburg, Katwijk aan den Rijn
30	Leiden, Centraal Station - Noordwijk, Willem van den Bergh	Oegstgeest, Rijnsburg, Katwijk aan den Rijn, Katwijk
31	Leiden, Centraal Station - Noordwijk, Willem van den Bergh	Oegstgeest, Rijnsburg, Katwijk aan den Rijn, Katwijk
38	Leiden, Centraal Station - Katwijk, Zonnebloemstraat/Unmanned Valley	Oegstgeest, Valkenburg, Katwijk aan den Rijn
43	Leiden, Centraal Station - Den Haag, Centraal Station	Universiteitsterrein, Haagse Schouw, Wassenaar (De Kieviet, van Oldenbarneveltweg, Maaldrift), Mariahove, Bezuidenhout
45	Leiden, Centraal Station - Den Haag, Centraal Station	Breestraat, Station Lammenschans, Voorschoten, GGZ Haagstreek, Station Leidschendam-Voorburg, Station Voorburg, Voorburg, Beatrixkwartier/Bezuidenhout
50	Leiden, Centraal Station - Lisse, Meer en Duin	Oegstgeest, Warmond, Sassenheim
55	Voorhout, Station - Voorschoten, Starrenburg	Sassenheim, Oegstgeest, Leiderdorp Rijnland Ziekenhuis, Leiden Centraal Station, Haagweg-Noord, Noord-Hofland, Vlietwijk, Station Voorschoten
56	Sassenheim, Station - Roelofarendsveen, Stationsstraat	Oegstgeest, Leiden Centraal Station, Leiderdorp, Oud Ade, Rijpwetering, Nieuwe Wetering
169	Leiden, Centraal Station - Alphen aan den Rijn, Station	Zoeterwoude-Rijndijk, Hazerswoude-Rijndijk, Koudekerk aan den Rijn
182	Leiden, Centraal Station - Alphen aan den Rijn, Station	Leiderdorp, Hoogmade, Woubrugge, Ter Aar
183	Oegstgeest, Corpus - Alphen aan den Rijn, Station	Leiden Centraal Station, Leiderdorp, Hoogmade, Woubrugge
250	Leiden, Centraal Station - Haarlem, Station	Bio Science Park, A44/Sassenheim, Lisse, Hillegom, Bennebroek, Heemstede
365	Leiden, Centraal Station - Schiphol, Plaza	Leiderdorp, Roelofarendsveen, Oude Wetering, Weteringbrug, Hoofddorp, De Hoek
366	Leiden, Centraal Station - Leimuiden, Tuinderij	Leiderdorp, Roelofarendsveen, Oude Wetering, Weteringbrug, Leimuiderbrug
400	Katwijk, ESA ESTEC - Zoetermeer, Centrum-West	Katwijk aan den Rijn, Valkenburg, Oegstgeest, Leiden Centraal Station, Zoeterwoude, Stompwijk
401	Katwijk, Boulevard-South - Zoetermeer, Centrum-West	Katwijk aan den Rijn, Valkenburg, Oegstgeest, Leiden Centraal Station, Zoeterwoude, Stompwijk
410	Leiden, Centraal Station - Leiderdorp, Alrijne Ziekenhuis	
854	Leiden, Centraal Station - Lisse, Keukenhof	

== Gallery ==
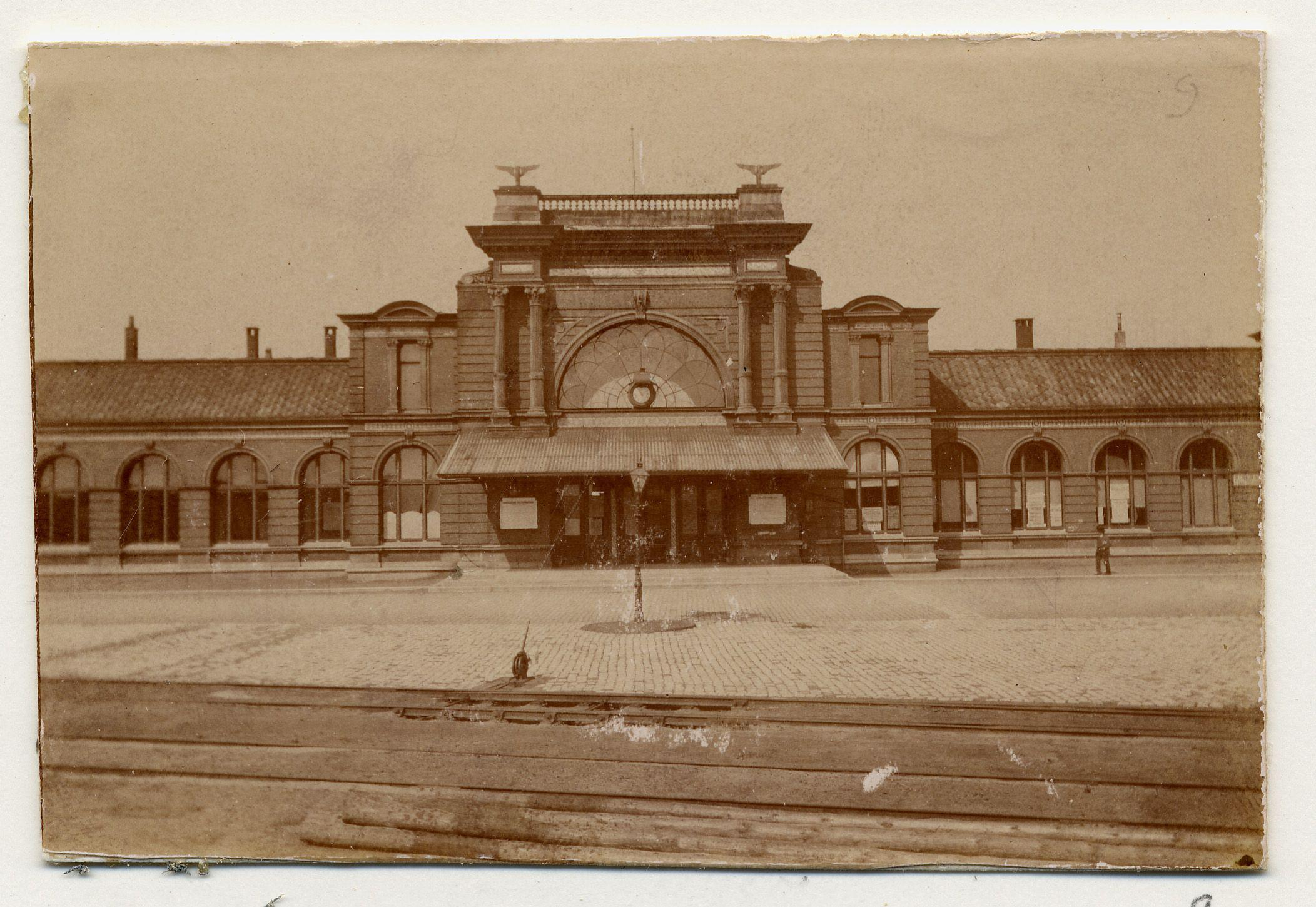
Leiden II with goods tracks in front, c. 1900.

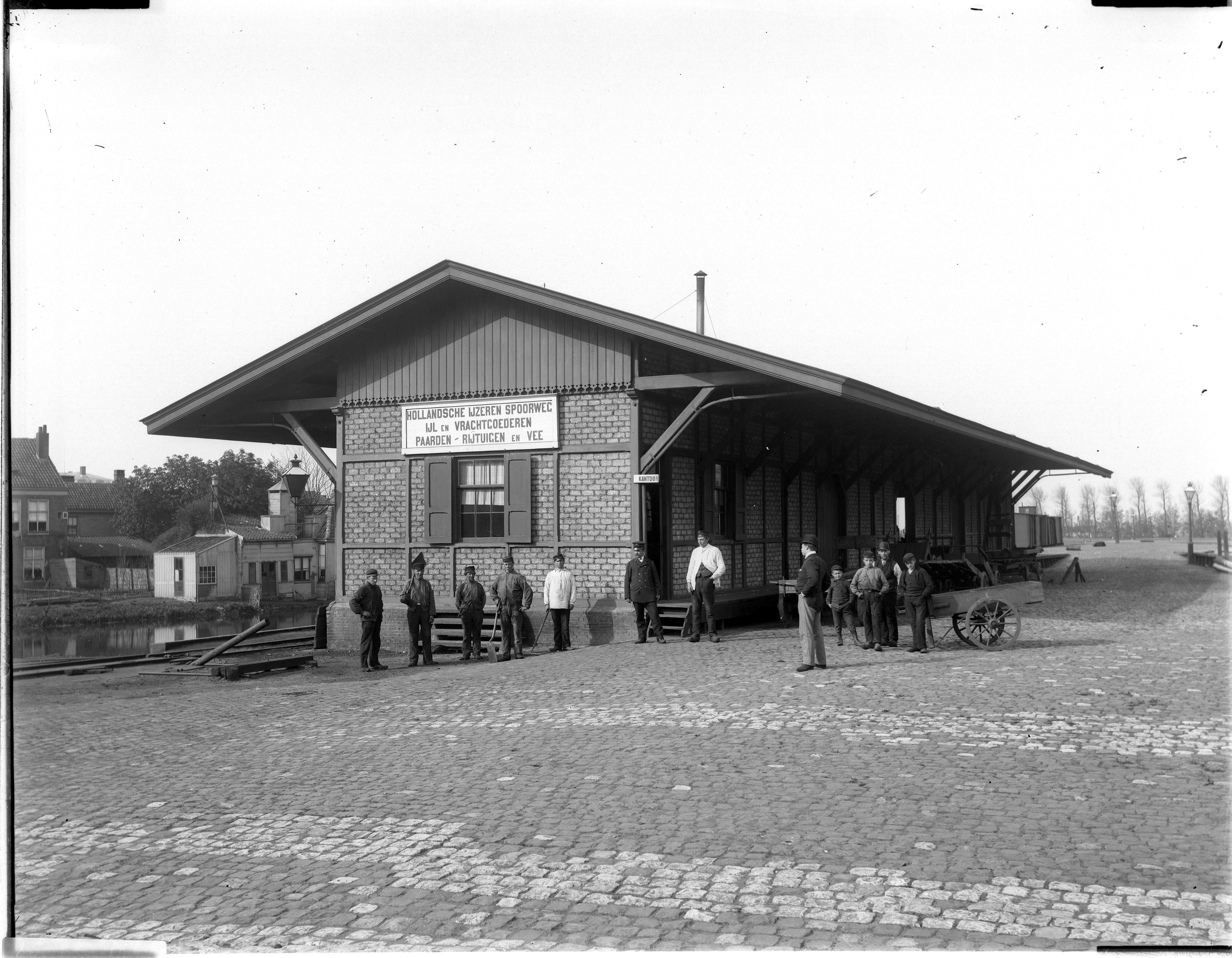
The goods shed at Leiden II, 1880.

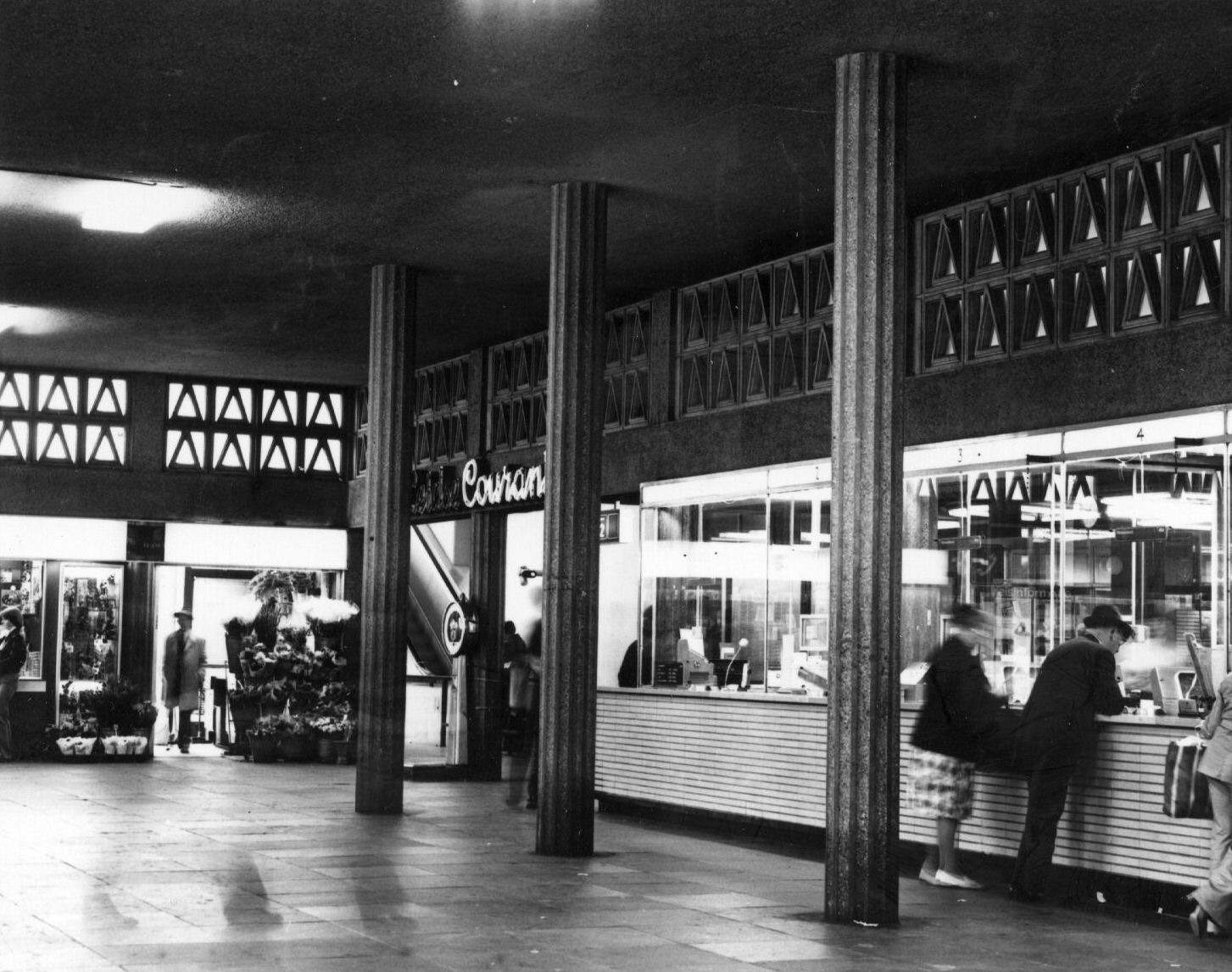
Ticket counter in the hall of Leiden III.

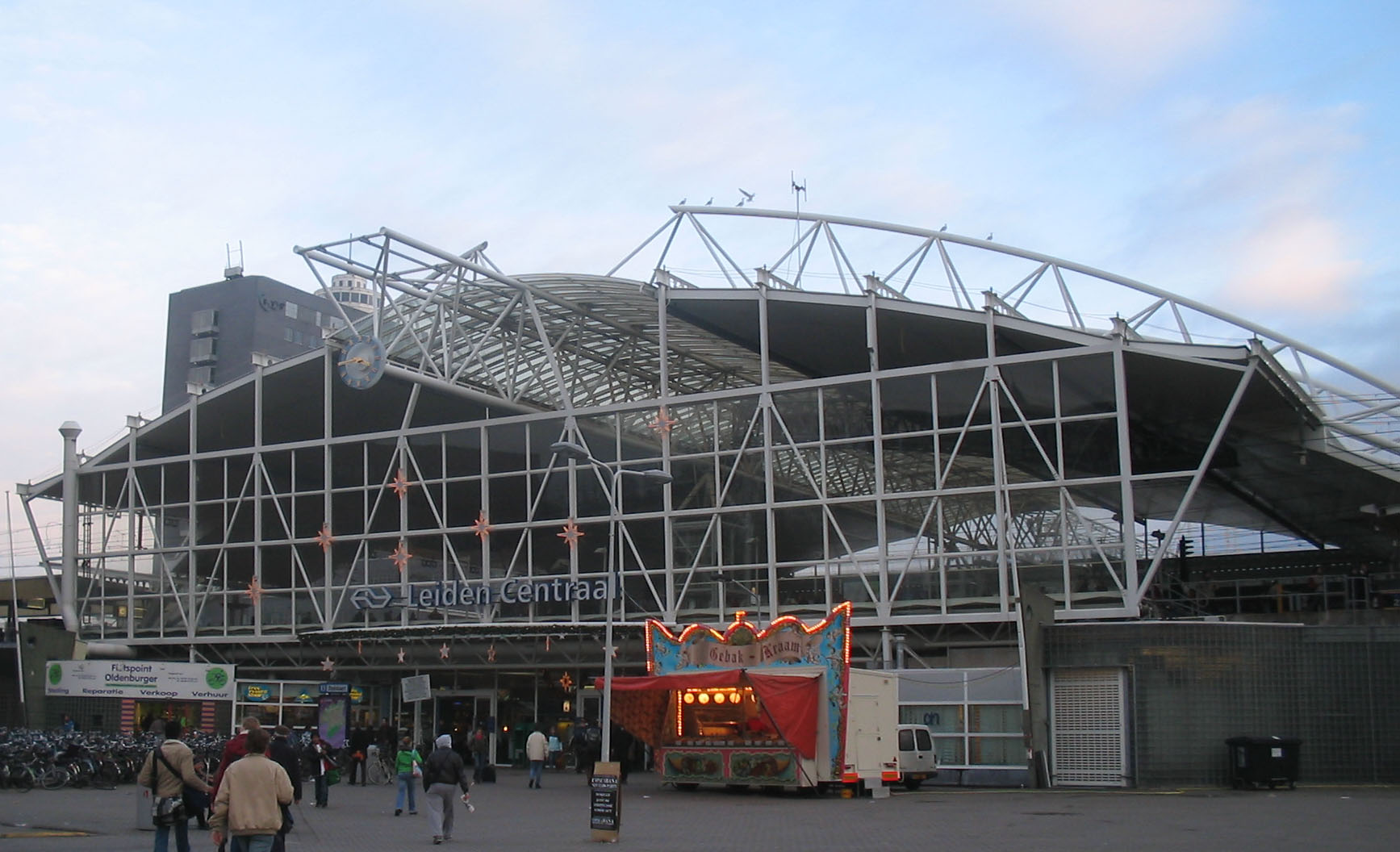
Exit near the Leiden University hospital.

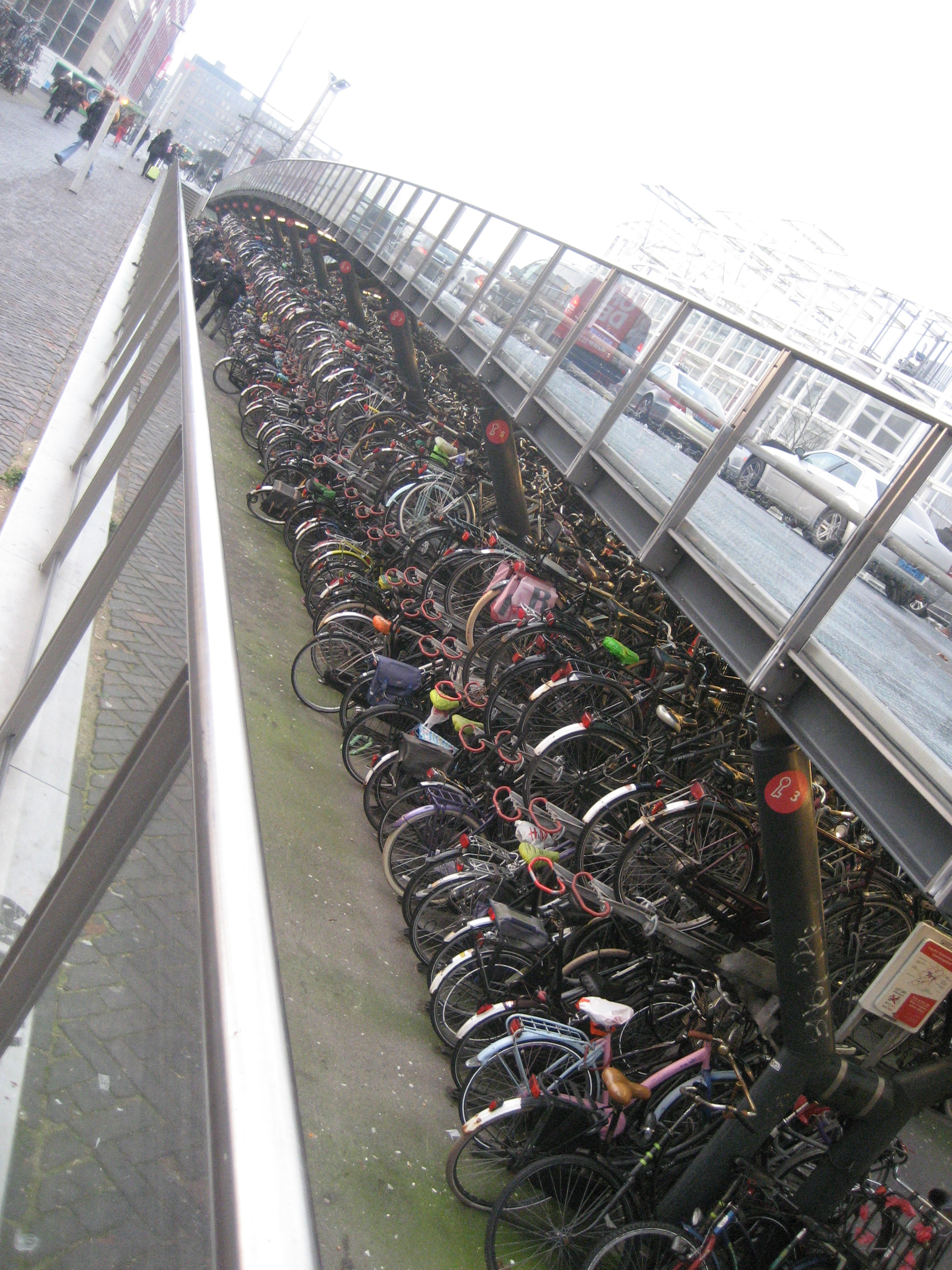
Bicycles near the railway station

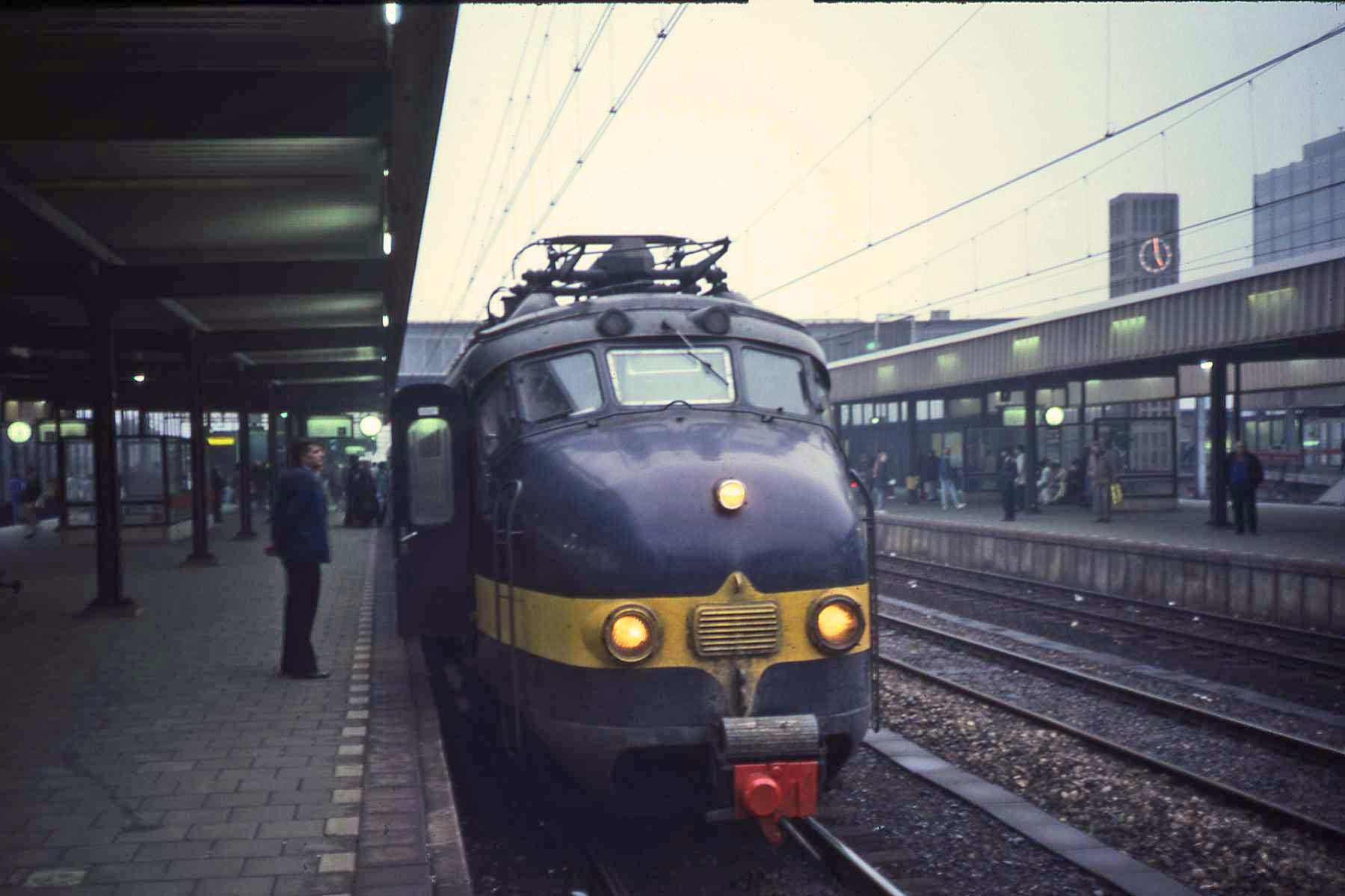
Benelux train, 1986
