= Vink =

Vink, Dutch for chaffinch, is a Dutch surname. It usually is a metonymic occupational surname, referring to one who catches chaffinches (and other small birds) in a vinkenbaan, for food or entertainment. Variants of the name are De Vink and Vinck. The forms Vinke and Vinken could be of patronymic origin, as Vink/Finke was a masculine given name. People with this name include:

- Elsbeth van Rooy-Vink (born 1973), Dutch mountain biker
- Gery Vink (born 1965), Dutch football coach
- Hendrik Jan Vink (1915–2009), Dutch physicist
  - Named after him: the Kröger–Vink notation for electric charge and lattice
- John Vink (born 1948), Belgian photographer
- Kevin Vink (born 1984), Dutch football striker
- Marciano Vink (born 1970), Dutch football midfielder
- Michael Vink (born 1991), New Zealand racing cyclist
- Niels Vink (born 2002),Dutch champion wheelchair tennis player
- Pieter Vink (born 1967), Dutch football referee
- Rachelle Vink (born 1991), Canadian curler
- Ronald Vink (born 1976), Dutch wheelchair tennis player
- Willem Vink (born 1931), Dutch botanist
- Wimilio Vink (born 1993), Dutch football midfielder

== See also ==
- Blinde vink, a Dutch veal dish
- De Vink, a railway station in Leiden near the former hamlet of De Vink
- Vink, a hamlet in Dutch Limburg
- Vink, a neighborhood of Kerkrade, Dutch Limburg
