= Vinck =

Vinck is a Dutch surname most common in East Flanders. An archaic spelling of the Dutch word for (chaf)finch, it is a variant form of the surname Vink. Notable people with the surname include:

- A.J. Han Vinck (born 1949), Dutch information theorist
- Abraham Vinck (1574/1575–1619), Flemish painter and art dealer
- Antoine de Vinck (1924–1992), Belgian ceramist, designer and sculptor
- Christian Vinck (born 1975), German tennis player
- Franz Vinck (1827–1903), Belgian painter
- Jonas Vinck (born 1995), Belgian football defender
- Karel Vinck (born 1938), Belgian businessman
- Marie Vinck (born 1983), Belgian actress and voice actress
