= Voorhout railway station =

Railway station in the Netherlands

Voorhout
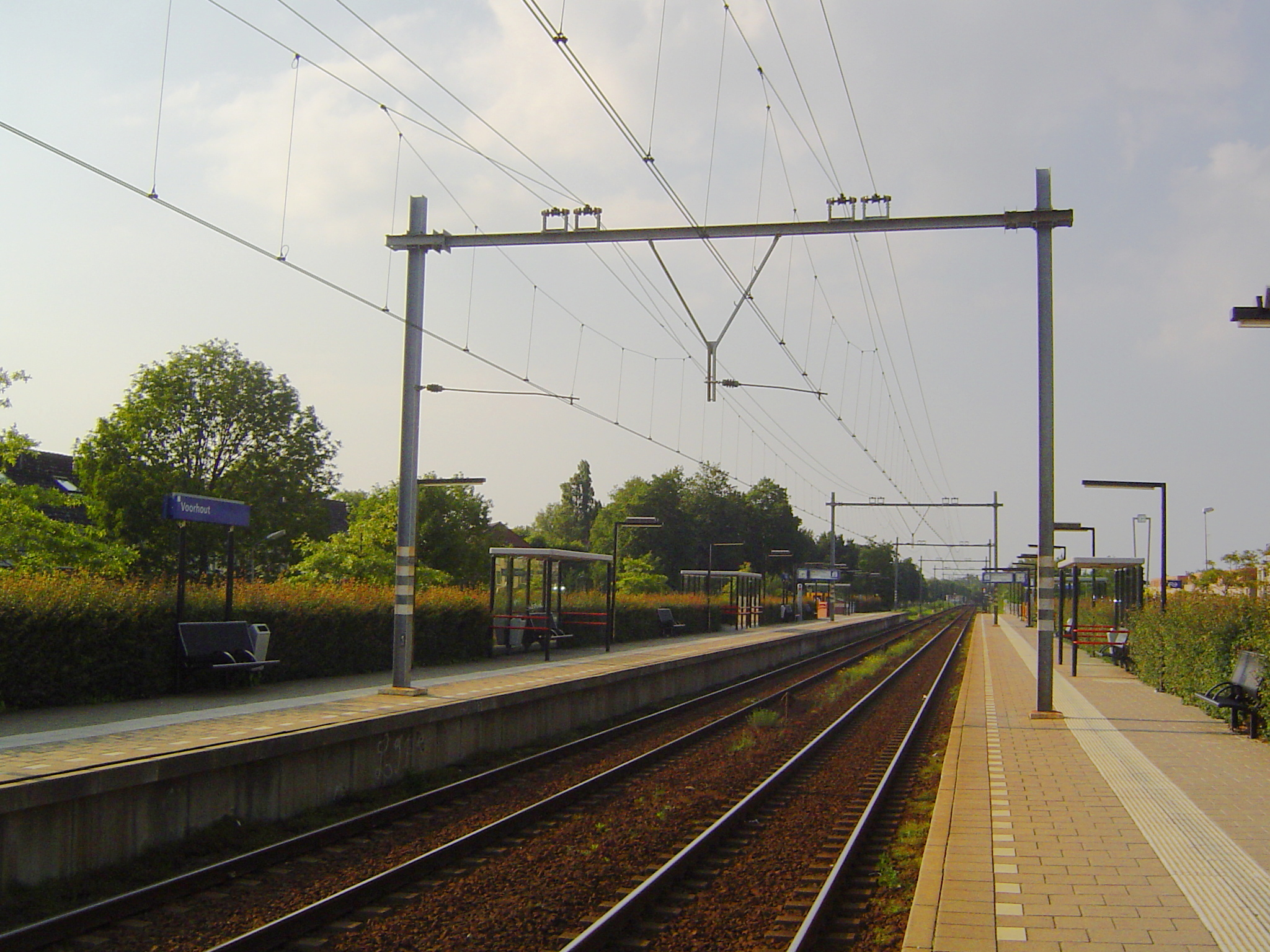

General information
- Location: Netherlands
- Coordinates: 52°13′27″N 4°29′4″E
- Line: Amsterdam–Rotterdam railway

History
- Opened: 1 March 1997

Services
Preceding station	Nederlandse Spoorwegen	Following station
Leiden Centraal towards Den Haag Centraal	NS Sprinter 6300	Hillegom towards Haarlem
Location
- Location within Netherlands

Voorhout is a railway station located in Voorhout, Netherlands. The station is on the Amsterdam–Rotterdam railway and the first station opened on 15 February 1892. This station closed on 17 September 1944. On 1 March 1997 the station re-opened. It is a simple station with two platforms on opposite sides of the tracks. The train services are operated by Nederlandse Spoorwegen.

== Train service ==
As of 11 December 2016, the following train services call at this station:
