= Weteringbrug =

- Village
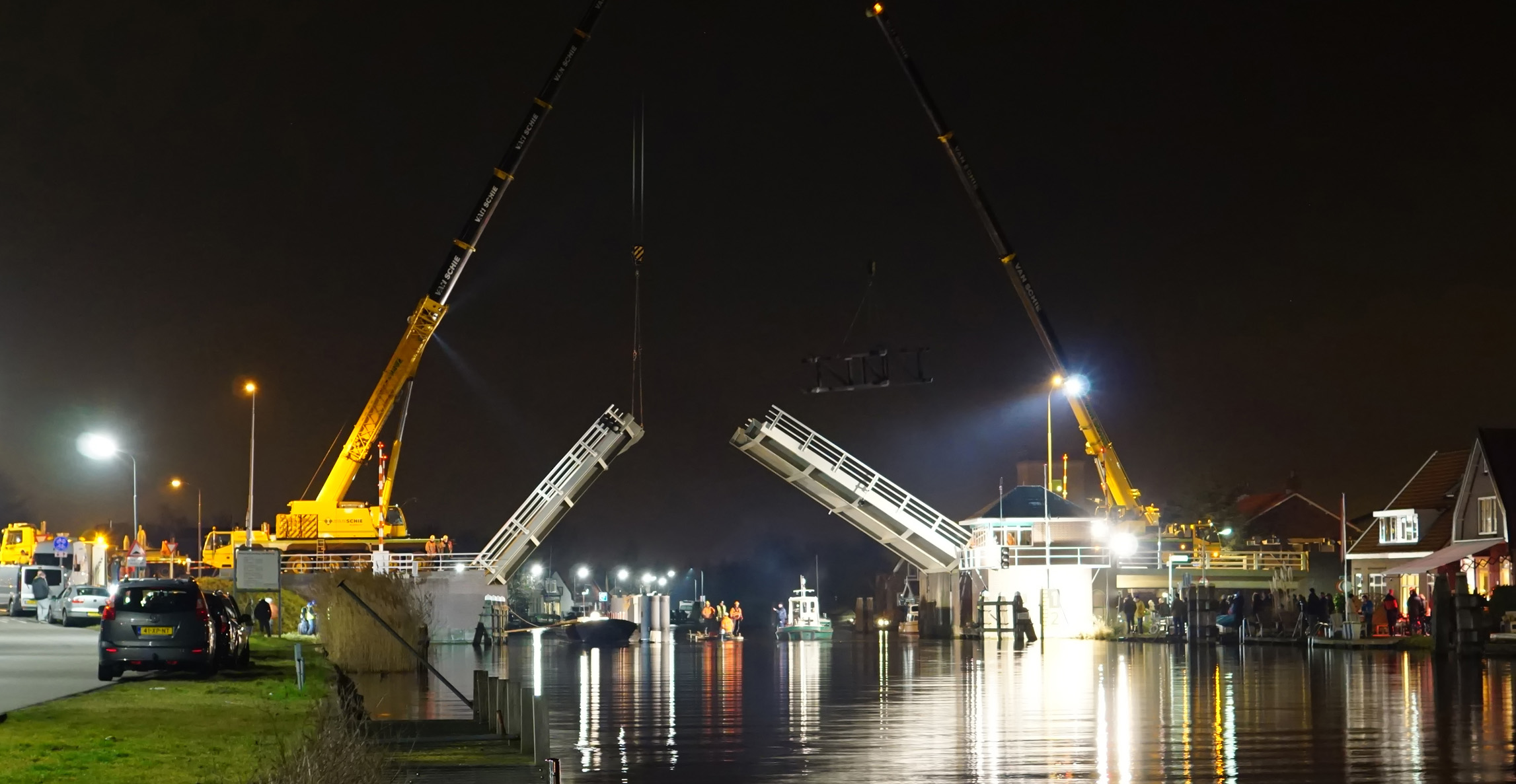
- The bridge at Weteringburg

- Location in the Netherlands Location in the province of North Holland in the Netherlands
- Coordinates: 52°13′N 4°39′E
- Country: Netherlands
- Province: North Holland
- Municipality: Haarlemmermeer

Area
  - Total: 2.59 km^{2} (1.00 sq mi)
- Elevation: −3.2 m (−10 ft)

Population (2021)
  - Total: 375
  - Density: 145/km^{2} (375/sq mi)
- Time zone: UTC+1 (CET)
  - Summer (DST): UTC+2 (CEST)
- Postal code: 2156
- Dialing code: 071

Weteringbrug is a village in the Dutch province of North Holland. It is a part of the municipality of Haarlemmermeer, and lies about 9 km north of Alphen aan den Rijn.

The village was first mentioned in 1936 as Weteringbuurt. The current name means "bridge of the Oude Wetering (river)".

== Gallery ==
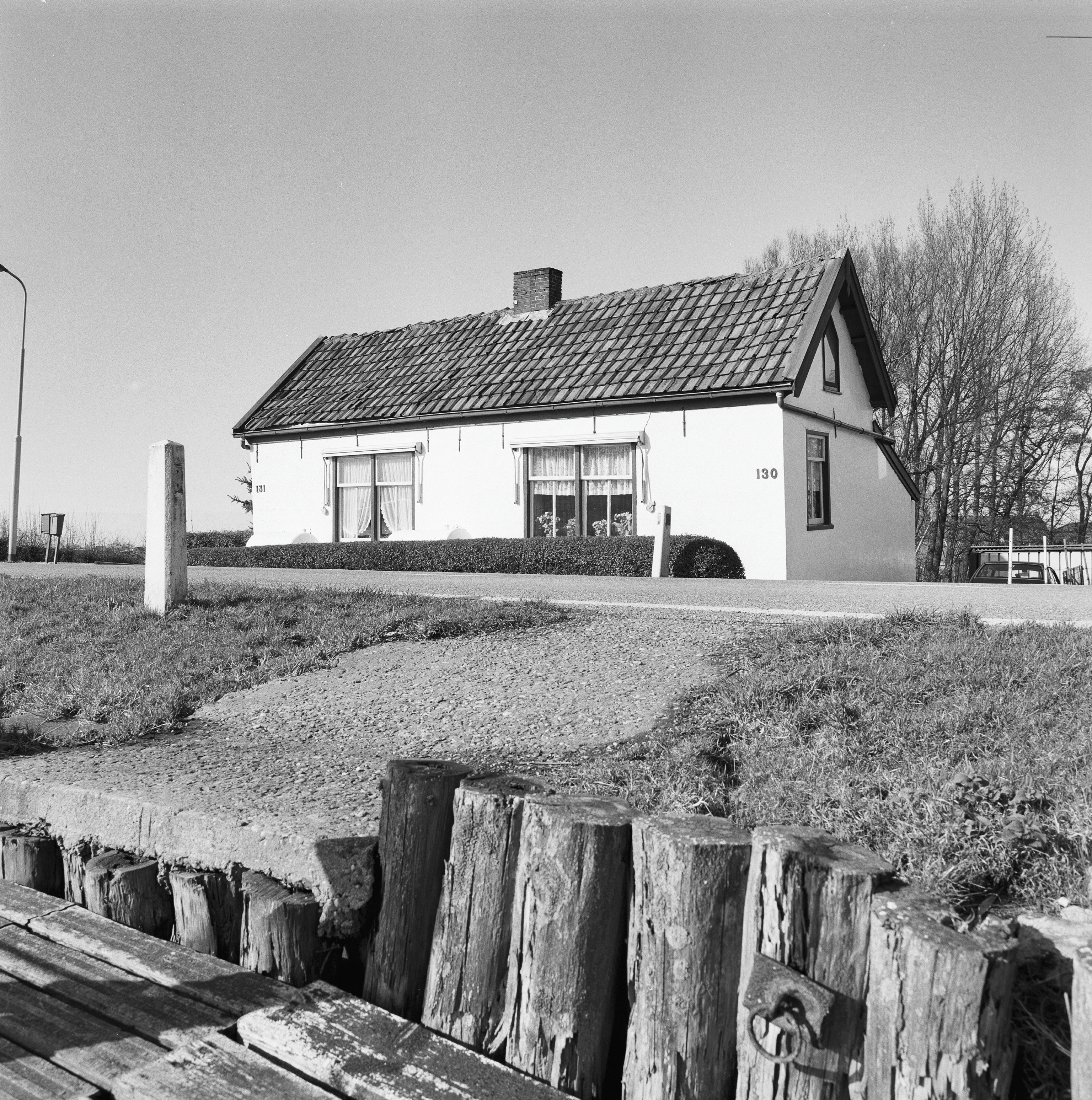
House in Weteringbrug

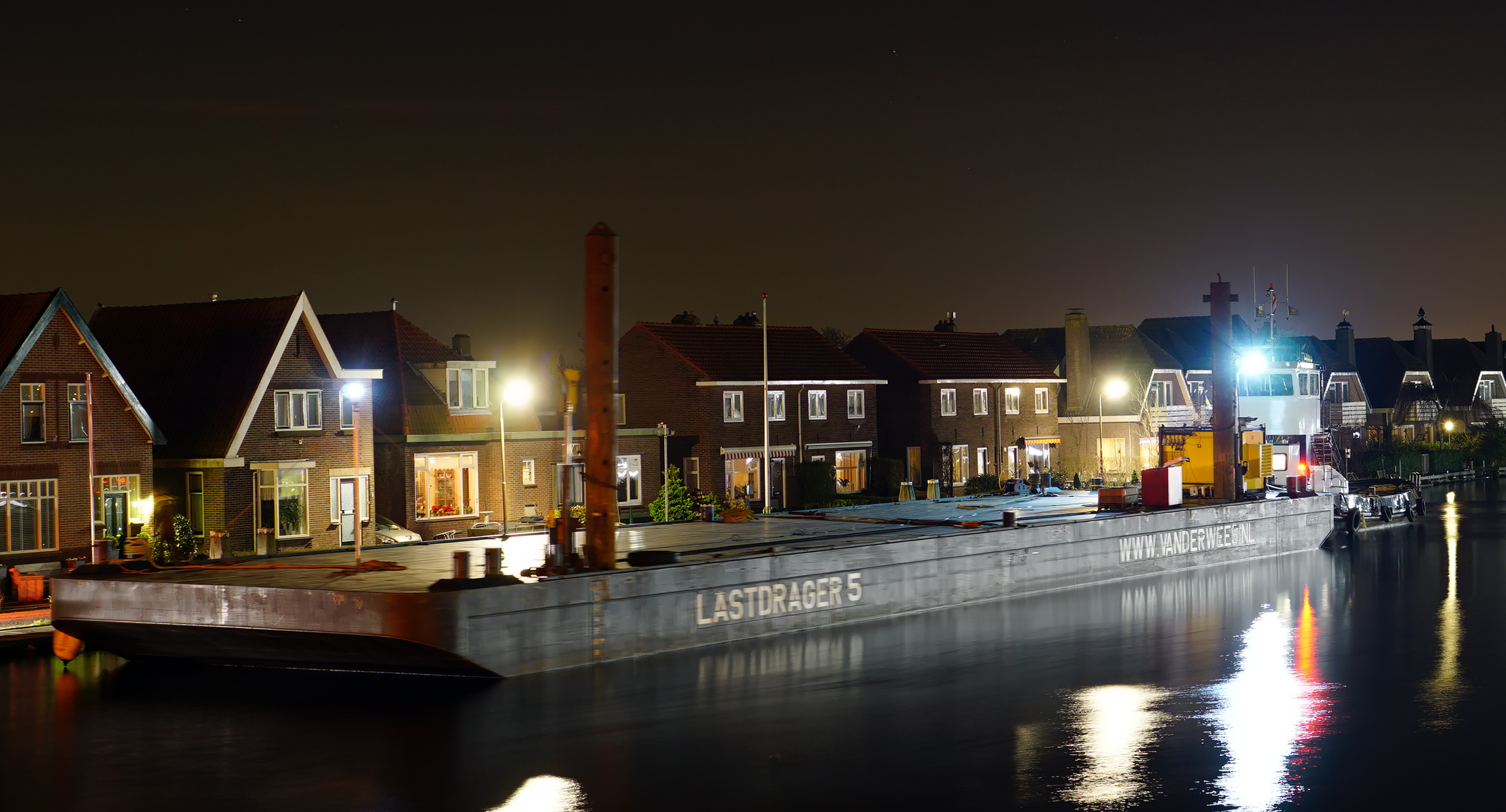
Canal view at night
