= De Vink railway station =

Railway station in the Netherlands

Station De Vink
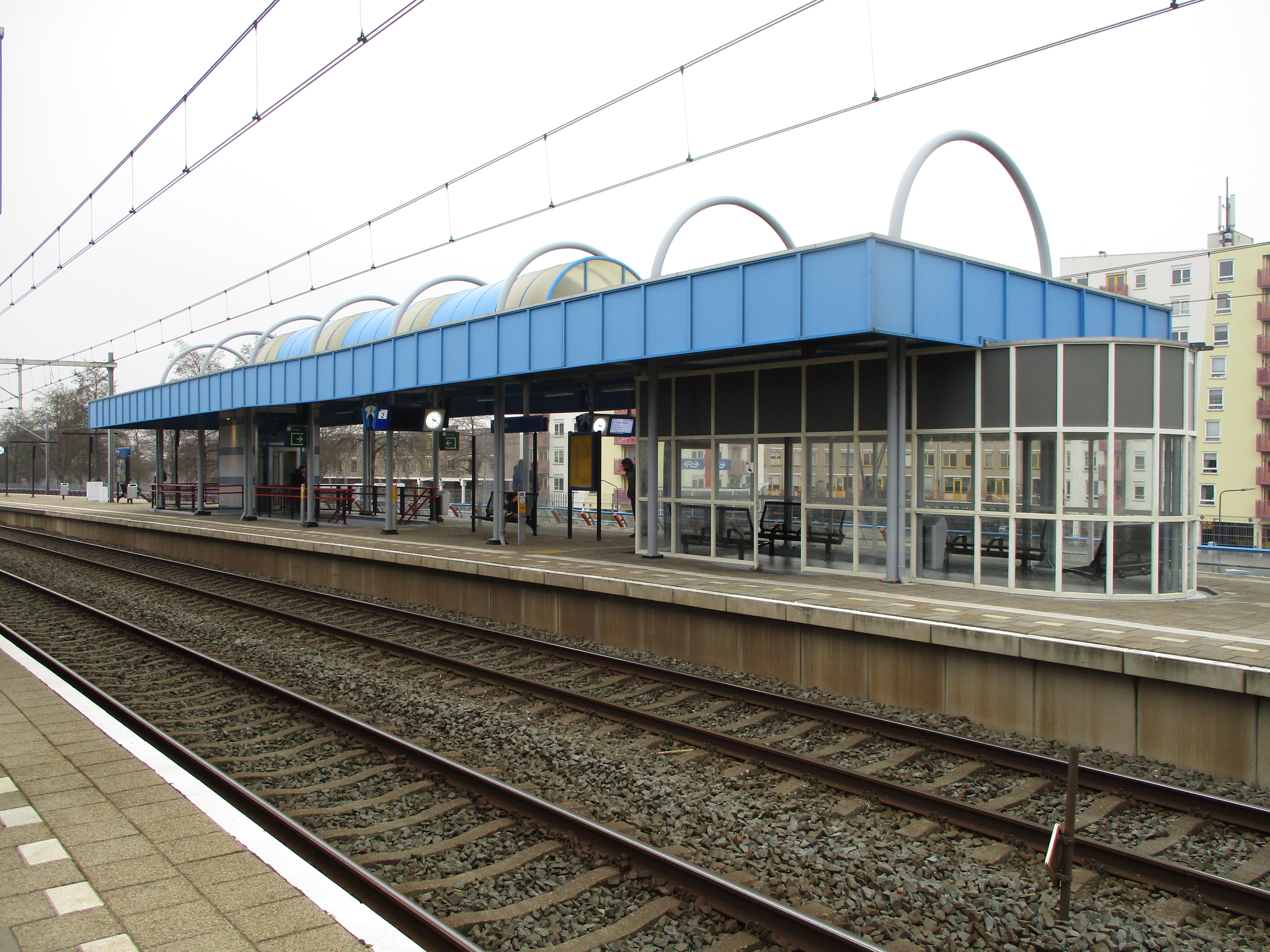

General information
- Location: Netherlands
- Coordinates: 52°08′45″N 4°27′28″E
- Operator: Nederlandse Spoorwegen
- Line: Amsterdam–Rotterdam railway
- Platforms: 2

Other information
- Station code: Dvnk

History
- Opened: 1906, reopened 1985
- Closed: 1928

Services
Preceding station	Nederlandse Spoorwegen	Following station
Voorschoten towards Den Haag Centraal	NS Sprinter 4300	Leiden Centraal towards Lelystad Centrum
Voorschoten towards Den Haag Centraal	NS Sprinter 6300 Not on evenings and weekends	Leiden Centraal towards Haarlem
Location
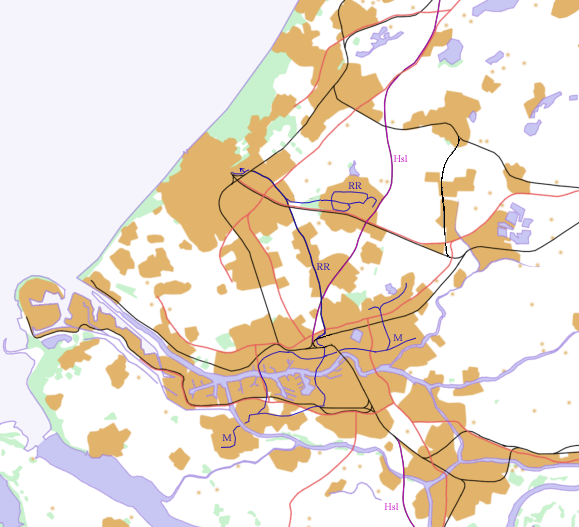
- Location within Southwest Randstad Location within Netherlands

De Vink is a railway station in the Netherlands. It is located near the former hamlet of De Vink, currently a part of Leiden.

The station re-opened in 1985. It is wedged in between the city of Leiden and the neighbouring town of Voorschoten. The tracks in the direction of The Hague are on Leiden ground. The tracks in the direction of Leiden are on Voorschoten ground. Because of this, it is currently the only railway station in the Netherlands not to feature the name of the city it is located in.

== Train services ==
The following services call at De Vink:

- 2x per hour local service (sprinter) The Hague - Leiden - Sassenheim - Nieuw-Vennep - Hoofdorp - Schiphol - Amsterdam Lelylaan - Amsterdam Sloterdijk - Amsterdam Centraal
- 2x per hour local service (stoptrein) The Hague - Leiden - Haarlem

== Gallery ==
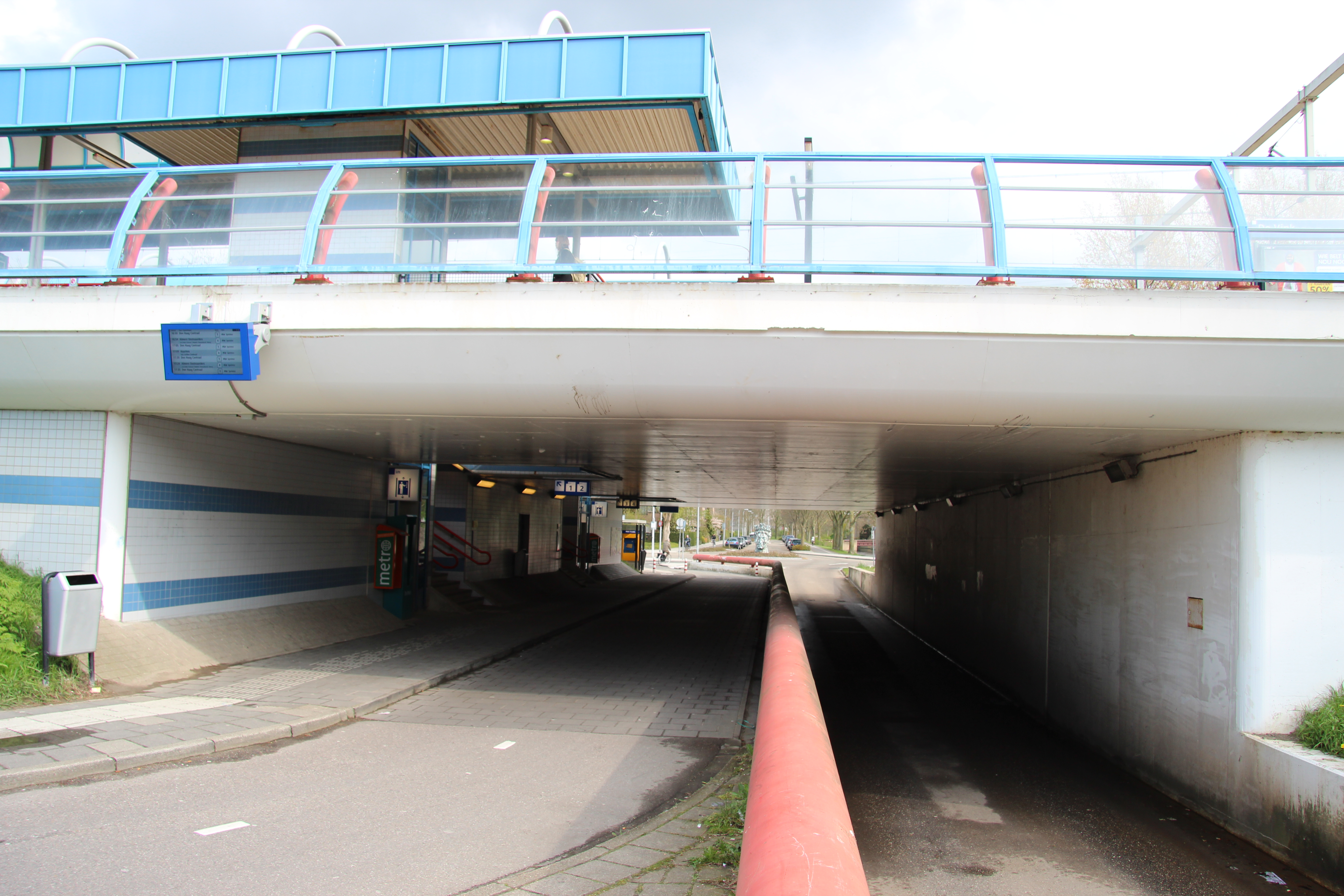
Station De Vink

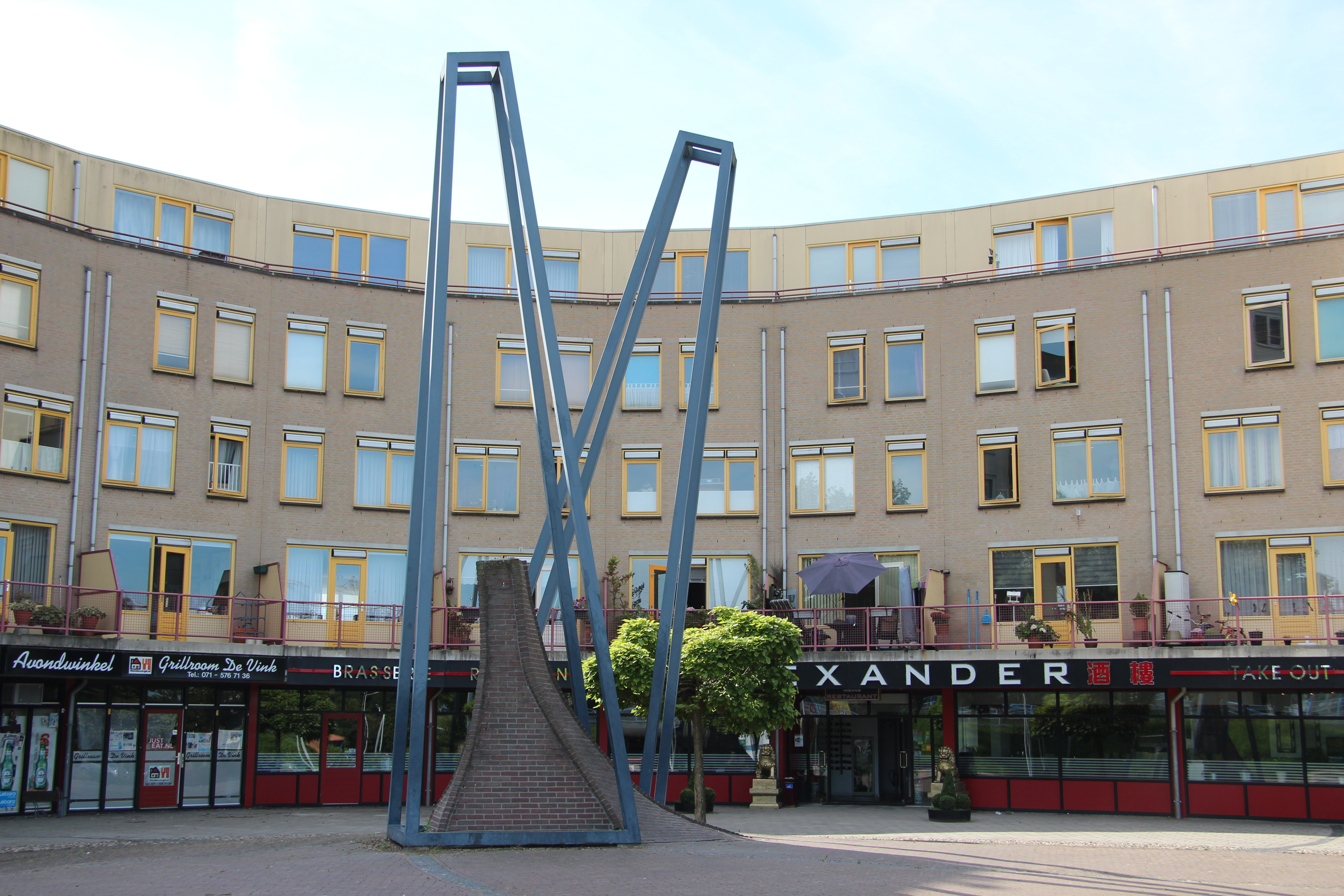
Monument near Station De Vink (by Cune van Groeningen)

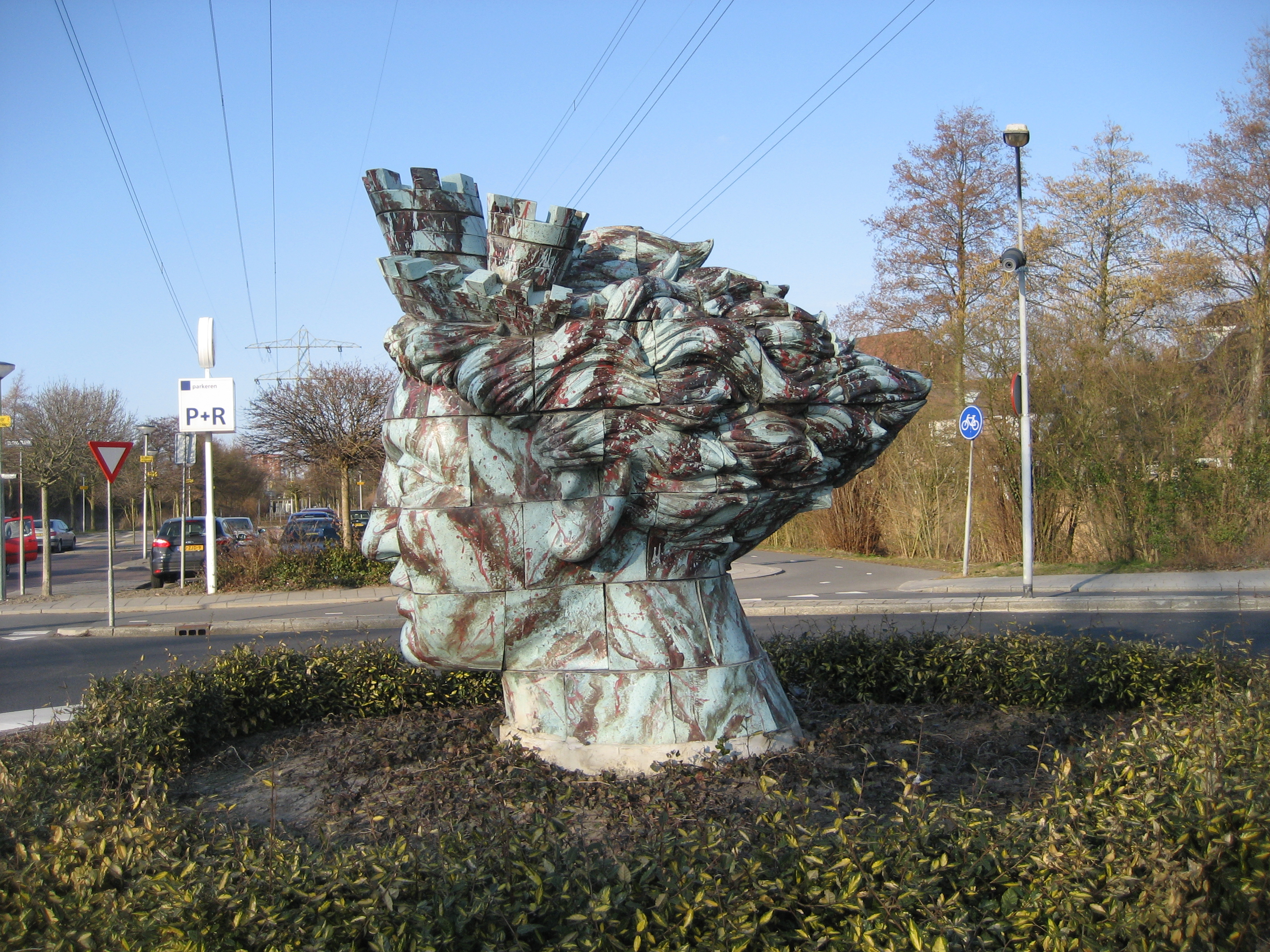
Goddess Sibyl near Station De Vink

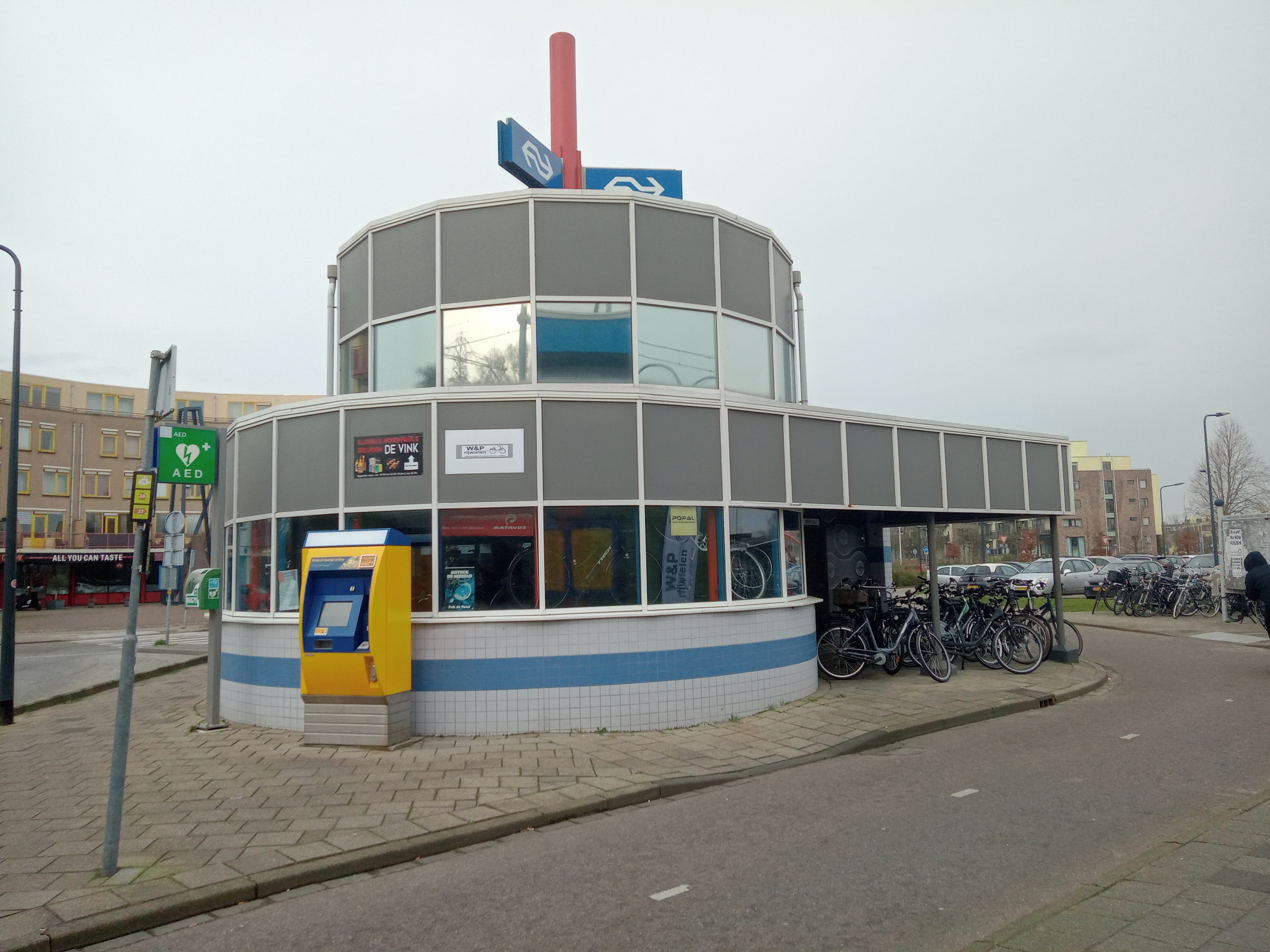
Building near the station

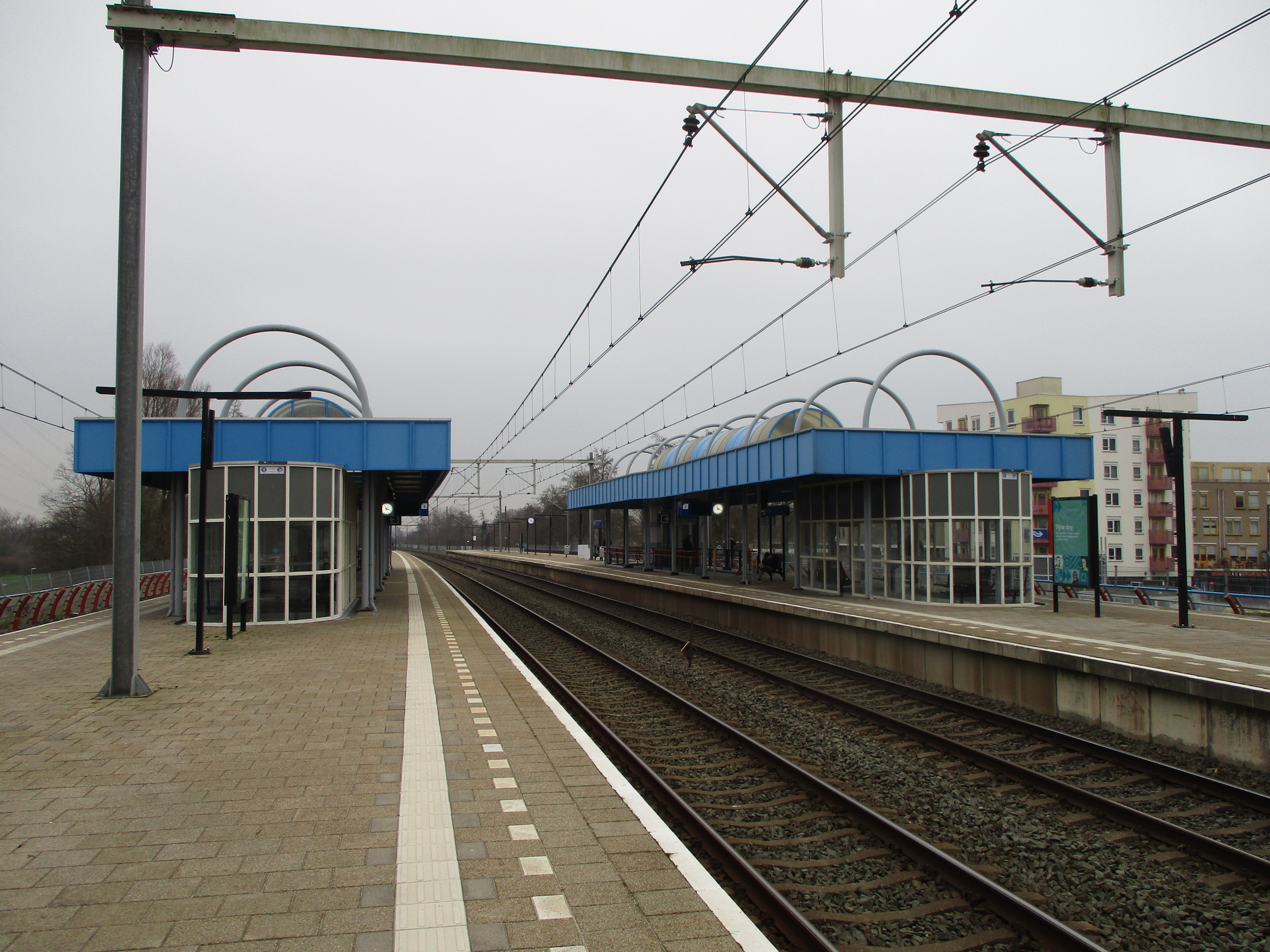
The platforms

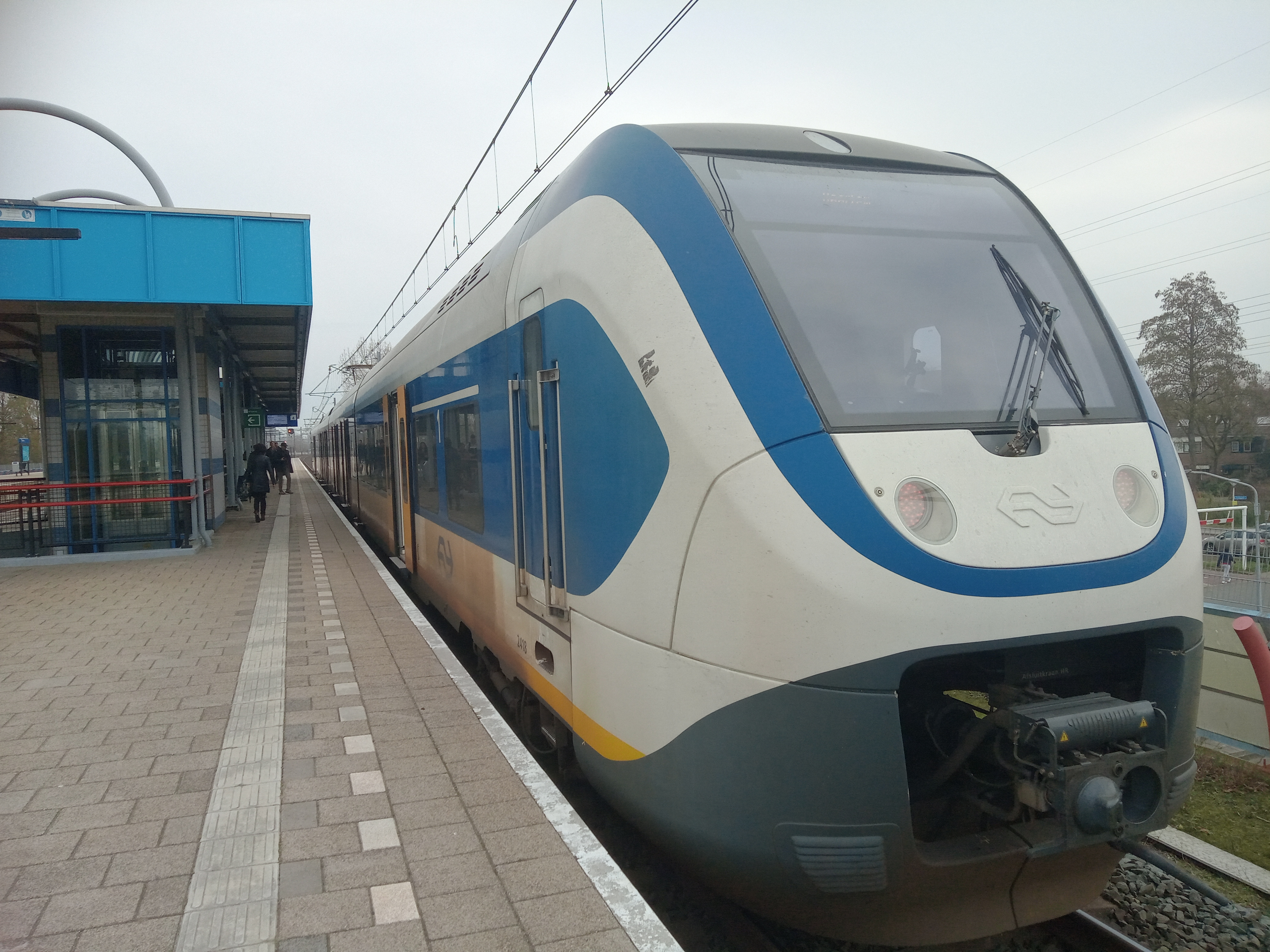
SLT to Haarlem on track 4

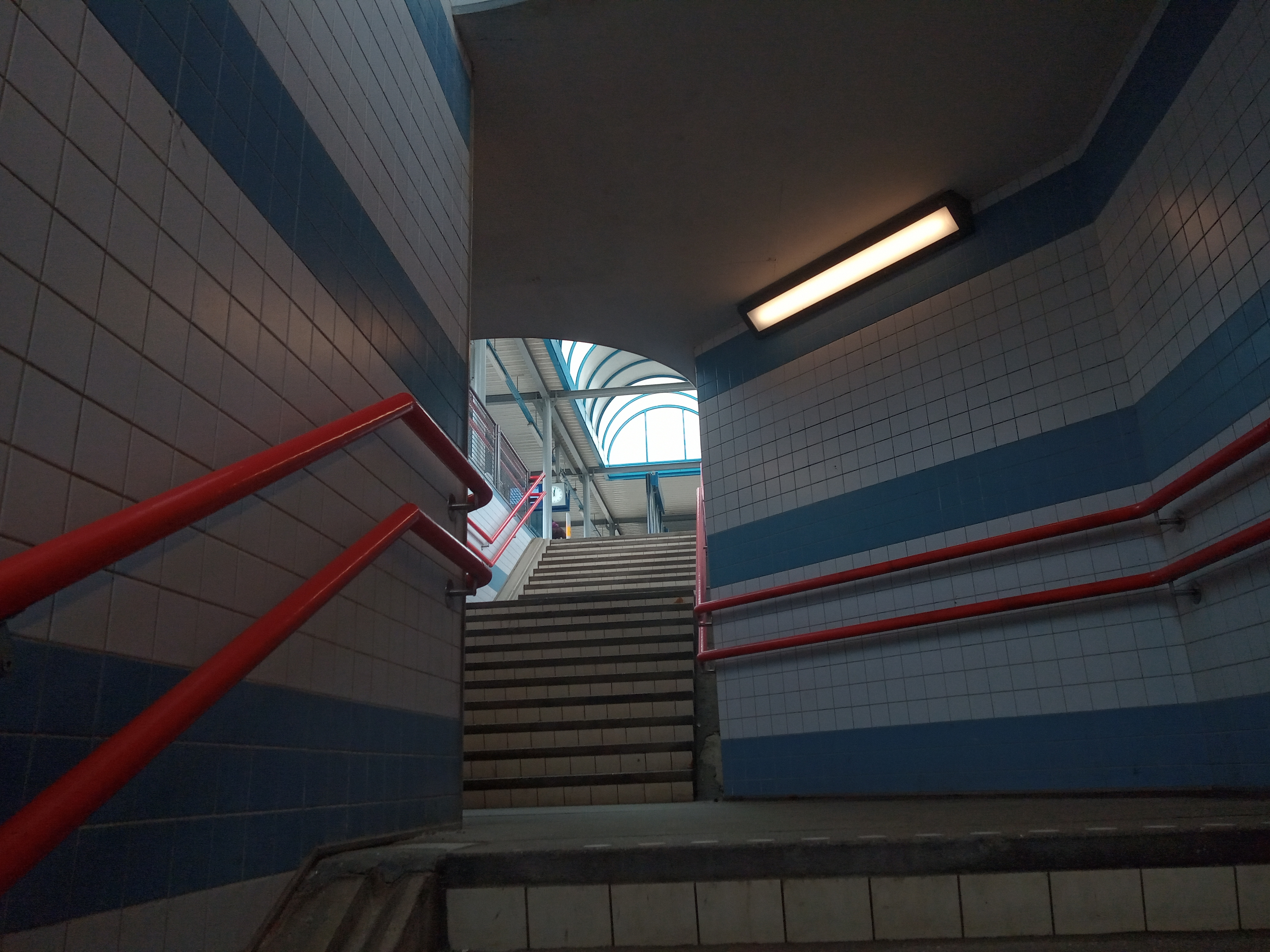
Stairs to one of the platform
