= De Vink =

De Vink is a Dutch and Afrikaans surname, meaning "the finch". It can refer to:

- Gregory de Vink (1998–2020), South African racing cyclist
- Jacques de Vink (born 1942), Dutch volleyball player
