= Den Haag Mariahoeve railway station =

Railway station in The Hague, Netherlands

Den Haag Mariahoeve
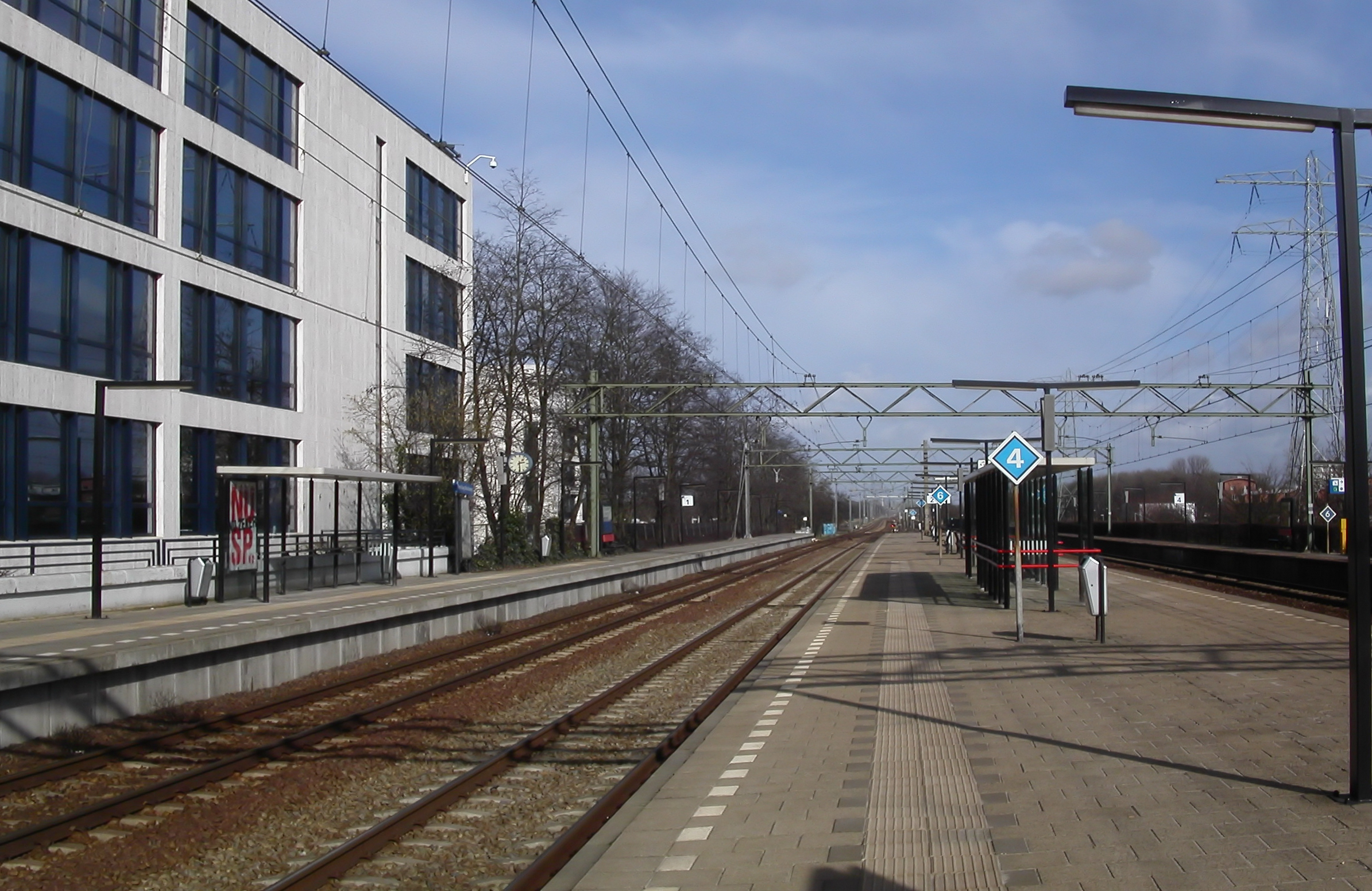

General information
- Location: Netherlands
- Coordinates: 52°5′26″N 4°22′11″E
- Operator: Nederlandse Spoorwegen
- Line: Amsterdam–Rotterdam railway
- Platforms: 4

Other information
- Station code: Gvm

History
- Opened: 1966; 60 years ago

Services
Preceding station	Nederlandse Spoorwegen	Following station
Den Haag Laan van NOI towards Den Haag Centraal	NS Sprinter 4300	Voorschoten towards Lelystad Centrum
Den Haag Laan van NOI towards Den Haag Centraal	NS Sprinter 6300	Voorschoten towards Haarlem
Location
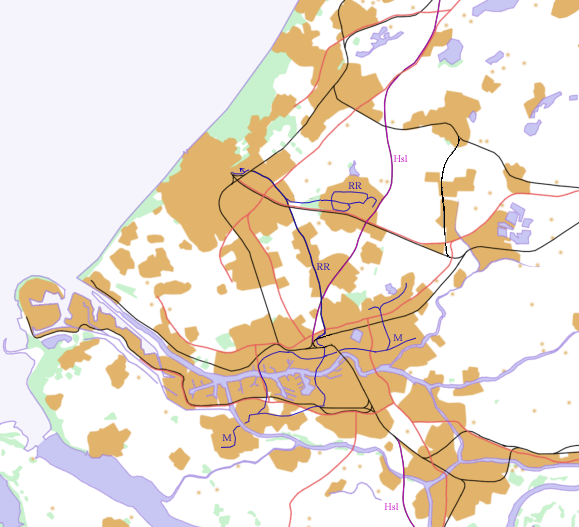
- Location within Southwest Randstad Location within Netherlands

Den Haag Mariahoeve is a railway station on the border of The Hague and Leidschendam-Voorburg in the Netherlands. The railway station, which opened on 22 May 1966, has two side platforms and an island platform. The rail connections between Den Haag Centraal and Schiphol and between Den Haag Centraal and Haarlem halt at Den Haag Mariahoeve.

== Train services ==
The following services call at Den Haag Mariahoeve:

- 2x per hour local service (sprinter) The Hague - Leiden - Schiphol - Duivendrecht - Hilversum - Utrecht
- 2x per hour local service (sprinter) The Hague - Leiden - Haarlem
