= Voorschoten railway station =

Railway station in Voorschoten, South Holland, Netherlands

Voorschoten
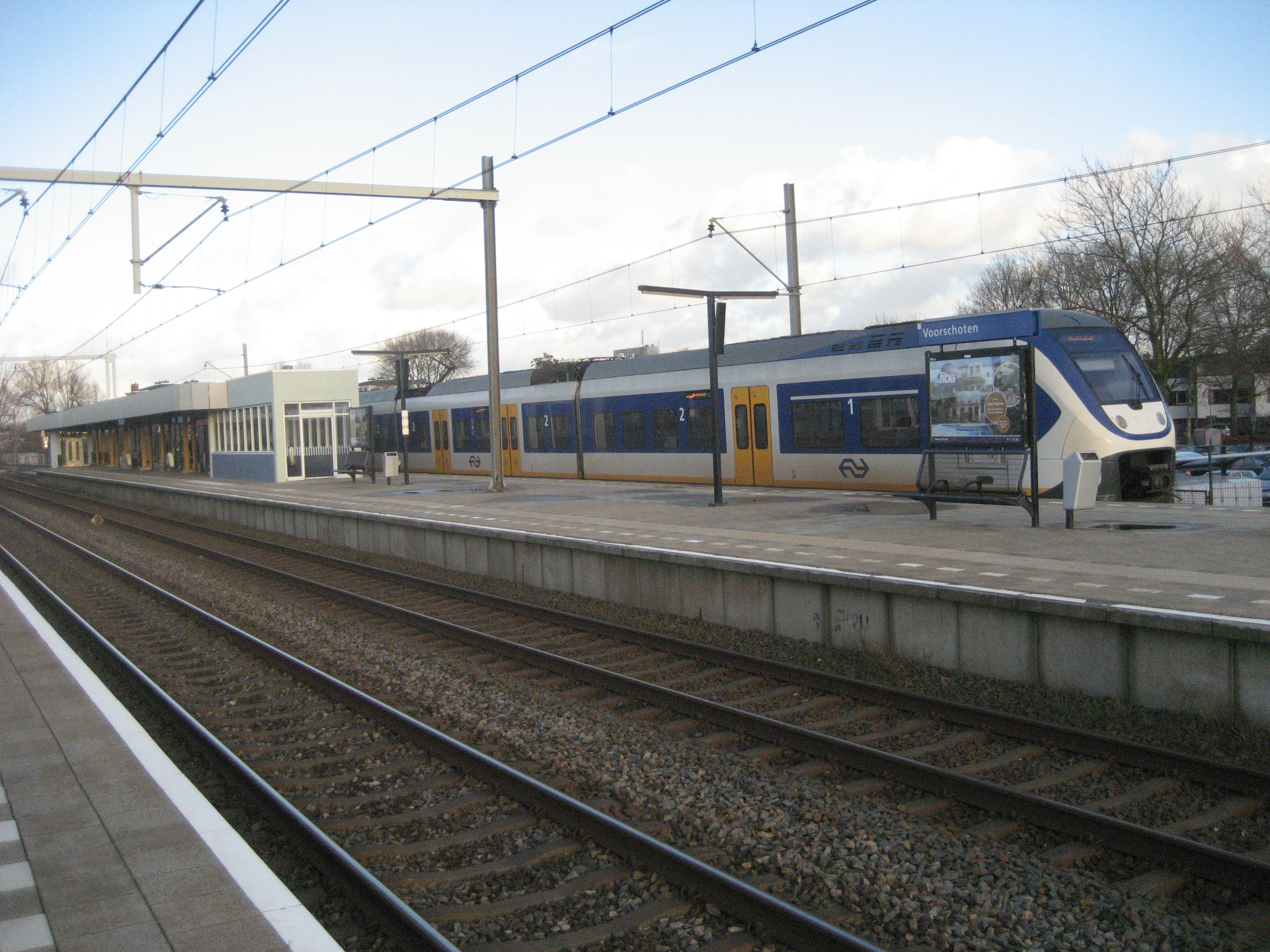

General information
- Location: Netherlands
- Coordinates: 52°7′35″N 4°26′2″E
- Line: Amsterdam–Rotterdam railway

History
- Opened: 1969 (old), 1995 (current)

Services
Preceding station	Nederlandse Spoorwegen	Following station
Den Haag Mariahoeve towards Den Haag Centraal	NS Sprinter 4300	De Vink towards Lelystad Centrum
Den Haag Mariahoeve towards Den Haag Centraal	NS Sprinter 6300 Not on evenings and weekends	De Vink towards Haarlem
Location
- Location within Netherlands

Voorschoten is a railway station in Voorschoten, South Holland, Netherlands.

== History ==
The first station opened on 1 May 1843 on the Amsterdam–Rotterdam railway. A new station building opened in 1886 and was closed on 17 September 1944. The station re-opened in 1969 and a hexagonal shaped station building opened. A new station was opened in 1995. The train services are operated by Nederlandse Spoorwegen.

== Accidents and incidents ==
- On 9 September 1926, a passenger train was derailed near Voorschoten. Four people were killed.
- On 4 April 2023, a passenger train collided with a crane that was obstructing the line at Voorschoten. One person was killed. A freight train was also reported to have collided with the crane.

== Train services ==
The following services currently call at Voorschoten:

- 2x per hour local service (sprinter) The Hague - Leiden - Schiphol - Duivendrecht - Hilversum - Utrecht
- 2x per hour local service (stoptrein) The Hague - Leiden - Haarlem
