= NS VIRM =

Electric multiple unit

NS Class 8600/8700/9400/9500
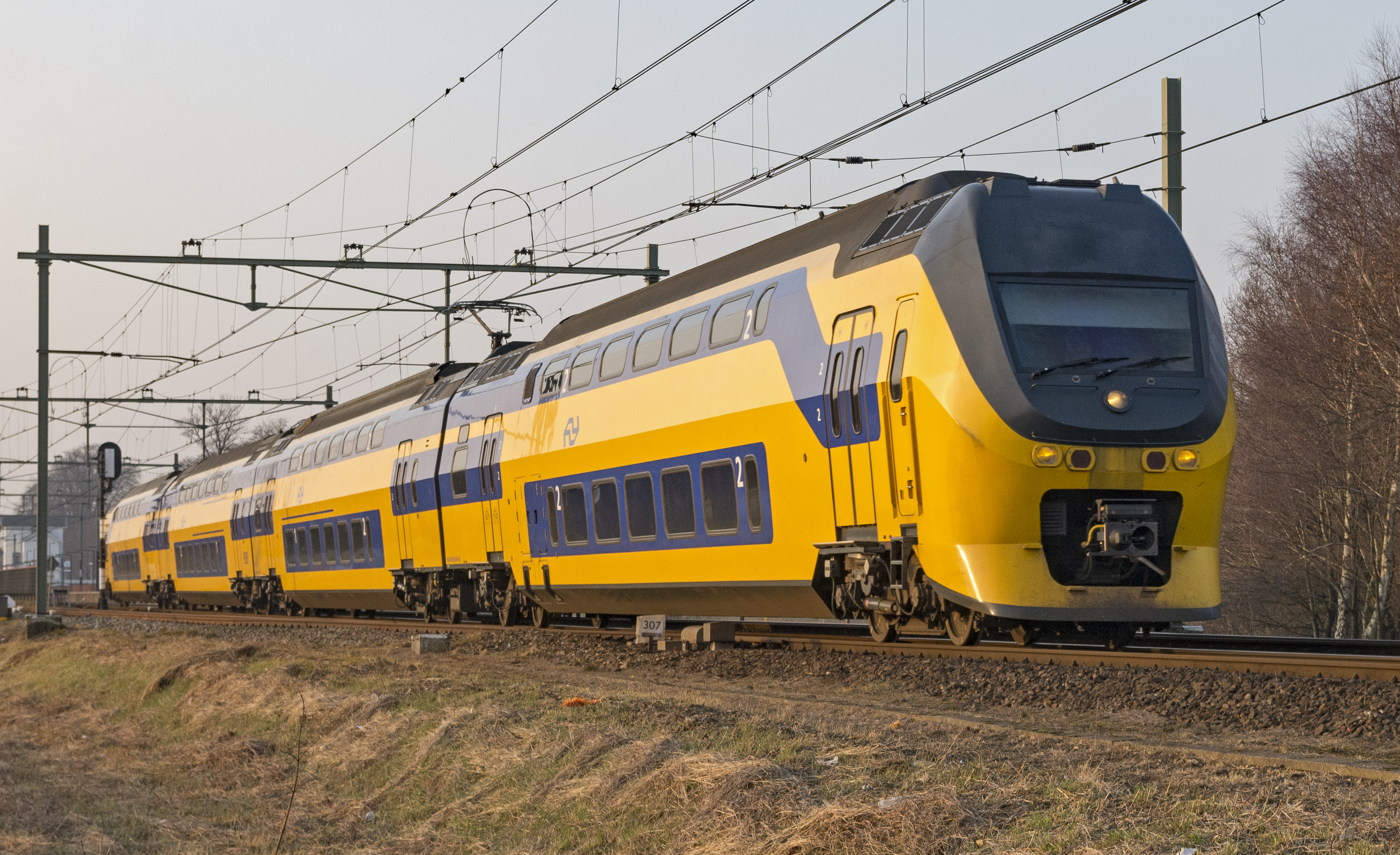
- A 4-unit VIRM EMU near Venlo

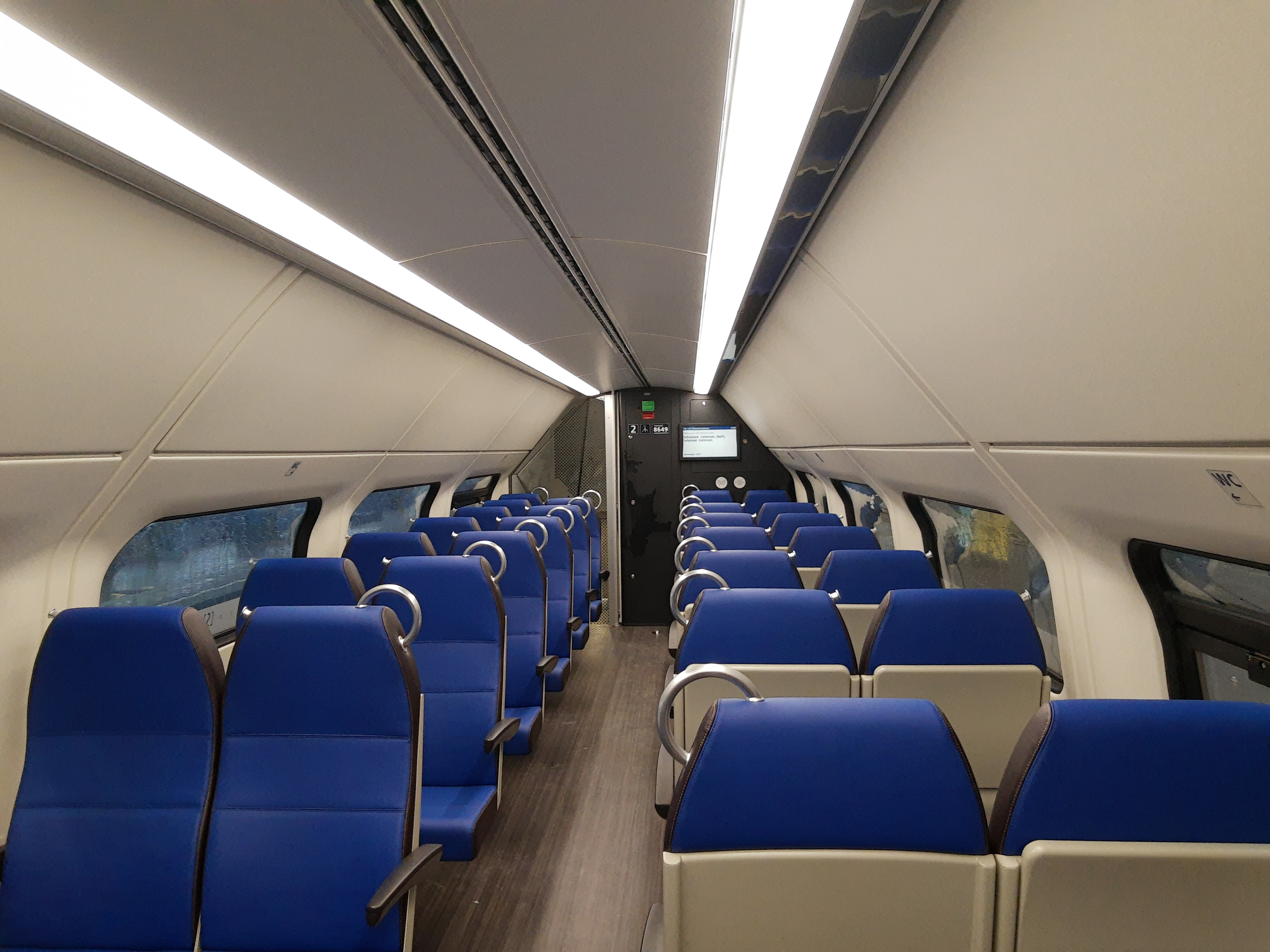
- Refurbished second class interior (first series)
- Stock type: Electric multiple unit
- In service: 1994–present
- Manufacturer: Talbot
- Number built: 178 sets
- Formation: 6 cars (8600/8700); 4 cars (9400/9500)
- Capacity: 8600/8700 – 129 (1st), 442 (2nd); 9400/9500 – 61 (1st), 330 (2nd)
- Operator: NS Reizigers

Specifications
- Width: 3,020 mm (9 ft 11 in)
- Maximum speed: 140 km/h (87 mph) (service); 160 km/h (99 mph) (design)
- Traction system: DD-IRM: Holec HPD GTO-VVVF; VIRM-2/3/4: Alstom Traxis IGBT-VVVF
- Power output: 2,388 kW (3,202 hp) (8600/8700); 1,592 kW (2,135 hp) (9400/9500)
- Electric system: 1.5 kV DC Catenary; all units have extra space for equipment to operate on 25 kV AC Catenary
- Current collection: Pantograph
- Track gauge: 1,435 mm (4 ft 8 1/2 in) standard gauge

VIRM trains, full name Verlengd InterRegio Materieel (transl. Lengthened interregional rolling stock), are a series of electric multiple unit (EMU) double-deck trains operated by Nederlandse Spoorwegen or NS (Dutch Railways), the principal railway operator in the Netherlands. NS has 178 of these double-deckers – 98 four-carriage sets, and 80 six-carriage sets. The trains were built between 1994 and 2009 – for the most part by Talbot with some railcars built by De Dietrich.

The VIRM trains evolved out of the previously existing DD-IRM series (DubbelDeks InterRegio Materieel or Double-deck interregional rolling stock). The first batch of 81 VIRM trains was created by lengthening all the existing DD-IRM combinations by one or two railcars. Three-unit trainsets were augmented by one carriage to transform them into a four-unit VIRM, and the four-unit sets received two more carriages, to create six-unit VIRM trains.

== Names ==
- VIRM (Verlengd InterRegio Materieel)
- DD-IRM (Dubbeldeksinterregiomaterieel)
- Regiorunner (express train, never used)

== First generation ==
The first generation of DD-IRM were delivered from 1994 to 1996 as three and four car units. The three car units were delivered in the 82xx class and the four car units delivered as 84xx. The first batch of 290 double deck coaches (individual) were delivered. The first 47 were built by De Dietrich and from then on by Talbot.

As the coaches were individual but would run as a unit, they are individually numbered. Collectively they have a set number e.g., 8201, having coach number 380 8001. However, there are no double numbers, for example there can not be an 8201 and 8401 at the same time.

In 2000 an order was placed for new coaches. The 3 car sets were to be upgraded to 4 car sets, and the four car sets upgraded to 6 car sets. This is why they are now called VIRM (V = verlengd – extended). These were renumbered into the 94xx series and the 86xx series. These sets were formed between 2001 and 2005.

== Second and third generation ==
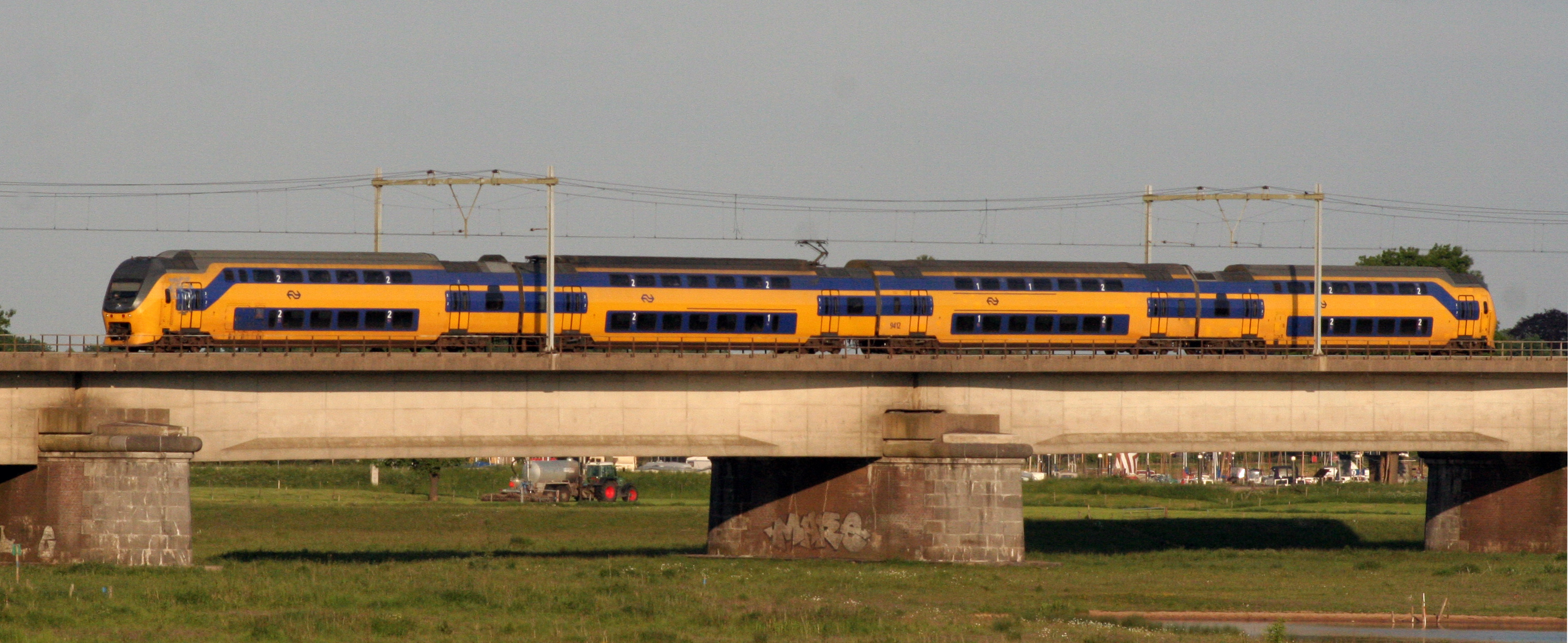
Complete view of four carriage unit

The second and third generation of VIRM were new sets built to the 4 and 6 coach formations, at the same time as the first generation were rebuilt. These were numbered 95xx (4 car units) and 87xx (6 car units). These sets featured different seats, which were also in the new coaches placed inside the first generation sets.

== Fourth generation ==
These sets were delivered from June 2008 and these are all 4 car units. They are numbered 9547–9597. These sets differ in that they do not feature the catering lift, meaning the stairs could be wider and the destination screens inside the coaches have disappeared, where instead information screens with travel information have been fitted.

== Refurbishment ==
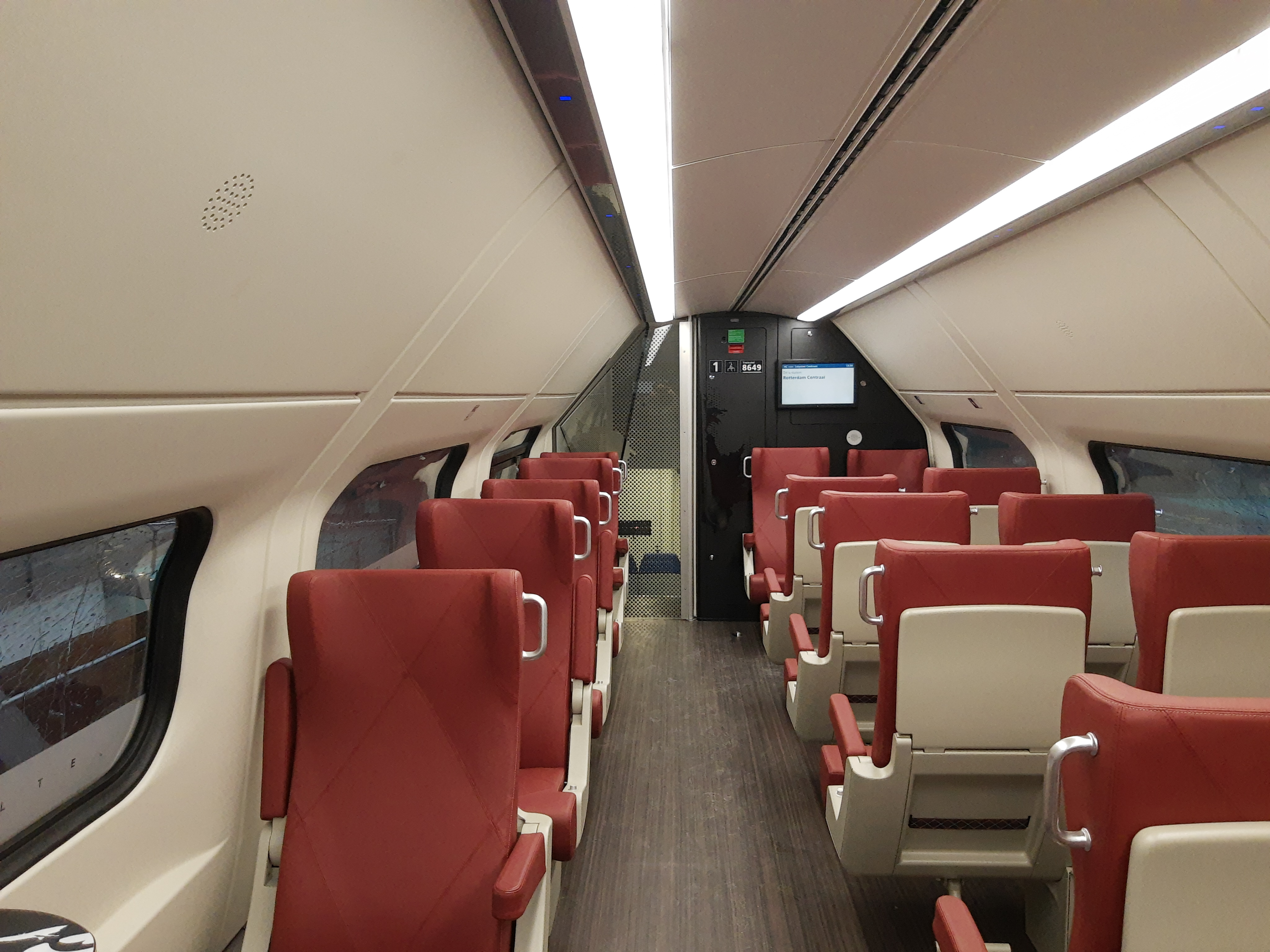
Refurbished first class interior (first series).

Starting in 2015, the VIRM-1 sets were being refurbished and fitted with new interiors similar to those seen in the DDZ trainsets, and with new-style liveries. These sets are officially referred to as VIRMm1.

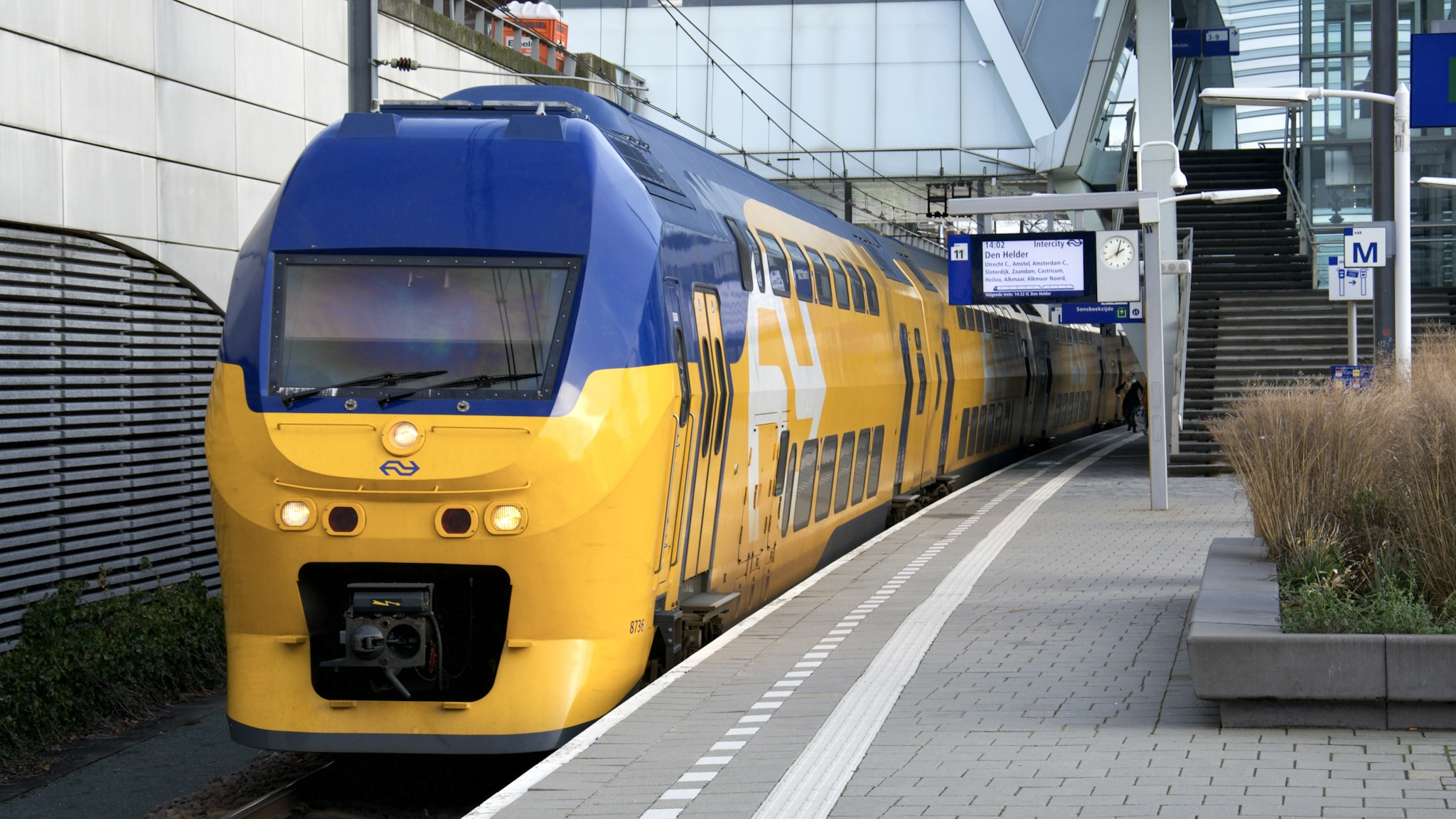
The refurbished 8736 departing from Arnhem Central station

In 2021, NS started refurbishing the second and third generations of VIRM trains. The trains were fitted with a brand new interior with some notable changes from the first generation. These include the instalment USB-outlets in both classes and the introduction of "love seats" on the balcony. The trains were also painted in the new "flow" color scheme.

== Numbering ==
vehicle type	DD-IRM 1994–96	VIRM-1 2002–	VIRM-2 2002–	VIRM-3 –2005	VIRM-4 2008–09
Short Trainsets; Long Trainsets	8201...8281 (34); 8401...8481 (47)	9401...9481 (34); 8601...8681 (47)	9502...9525 (13); 8701...8723 (12)	- 8726–8746 (21)	9547–9597 (51) -
mBvk1/2 290	8501–8662 (162)		8663–8712 (50)	8713–8754 (42)	8759–8861 (103)
ABv3/4 380	8001–8081 (81)		8101–8125 (25)	8126–8146 (21)	8147–8197 (51)
ABv5 380	8201–8247 (47)		8248–8259 (12)	8260–8280 (21)	
ABv6 380		8301–8381 (81)	8382–8406 (25)	8407–8427 (21)	8428–8478 (51)
mBv7 260		8801–8847 (47)	8848–8859 (12)	8860–8880 (21)	

- 34 trainsets in 9401–9481, no double numbering with 47 trainsets in 8601–8681
- 12 trainsets 8701...8723 only odd numbers plus 13 trainsets 9502...9525 remaining numbers
- mBvk1/2 8755–8758 are reserve carbodies, 8755 has become replacement 8718
- mBvk1/2 8829 was built as a replacement vehicle for an older trainset

== Different liveries ==
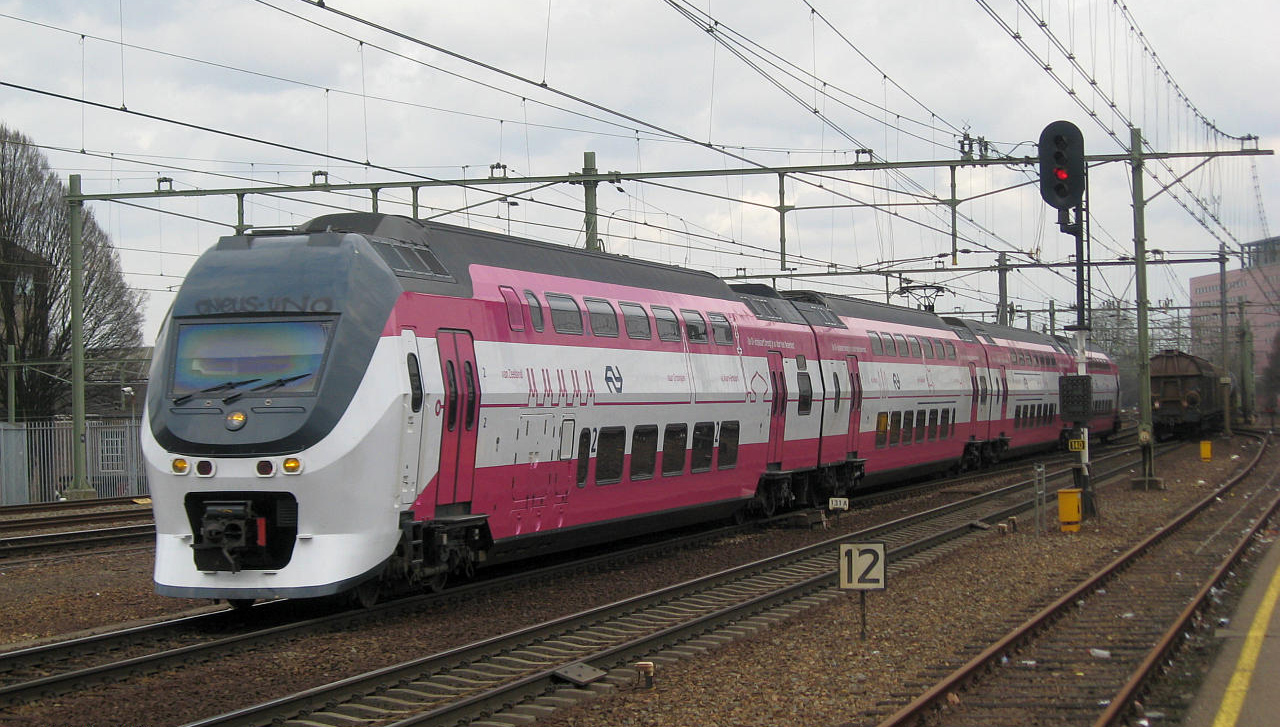
9524 in OV chipkaart livery

- 8707 – This carried adverts for Lekker lezen boven in de trein, Comfortable reading in the upper deck of the train, for a short period in 2016. The adverts were removed because it was said they were not fireproof enough.
- 8733 – This featured adverts between the two decks, advertising that it was the 300th VIRM set built. Livery no longer carried.
- 8741 – This is the prototype for the midlife-revision of the VIRM-2/3 series.
- 9411 – This is the prototype for the midlife-revision of the VIRM-1 series.
- 9514 – This carries adverts for Lekker lezen in de trein, Comfortable reading in the train.
- 9520 – This carried an orange/blue livery advertising Queen Beatrix Wilhelmina Armgard resigning from the throne.
- 9522 – This sported a white/magenta livery advertising the OV-Chipkaart.
- 9524 – This carried advertising liveries for Mamma Mia and The Lion King. As well as that, it sported a completely white/magenta livery, advertising the OV-chipkaart similar to unit no. 9522.
- 9525 – This carried the adverts for the NS/Olympic partnership.
- 9556 – This carries a blue/yellow dotted livery on the middle of the train which makes it look like it is green, it is called the "Groene trein", Green train, for advertising the cooperation between NS and Eneco (see below). Livery was designed by two students.

=== Green train ===
By 2015, NS hoped to let 50% of their trains run on electricity powered by wind turbines. By 2018, all the trains were planned to be running on "clean" electricity. To celebrate this and the fact that the first Dutch railway line was opened 175 years ago, NS and Eneco Energy held a competition for designing a green train.

The winners were two students from the Technical University in Delft. Their names are Michiel van Sinderen and Steffen de Jonge. Their design was to have the train be checkered with small black and blue squares. From even a small distance the train appears to be green. Michiel van Sinderen said it was the most beautiful thing he had ever made. This design was brought on VIRM number 9556. It was named De Groene Trein which means The Green Train. The difference between this train and other VIRMs is the paler shade of yellow and white arrows on the doors, similar to those on DDZ trains and modernized ICRm railway cars.

The train debuted on 20 September 2014. Its maiden voyage was an extra trip from Amsterdam Centraal to Haarlem. On 22-23 April 2026, it was taken in for refurbishment. The livery was removed and the train is subsequently back in service with the NS "Flow" livery, including the blue and yellow NS colours. The green livery was removed due to NS switching to power providers like Shell, instead of Eneco, which the Green Train was based.

== Services operated ==
The VIRM is now the main intercity train and can be seen across most of the NS network.

Series	Train type	Route	Material	Notes
800	Intercity	Den Helder - Den Helder Zuid - Anna Paulowna - Schagen – Heerhugowaard – Alkmaar Noord – Alkmaar – Castricum – Zaandam – Amsterdam Sloterdijk – Amsterdam Centraal – Amsterdam Amstel – Utrecht Centraal – 's-Hertogenbosch – Eindhoven – Weert – Roermond – Sittard – Maastricht	VIRM	This train runs only from Monday to Thursday and only towards Den Helder during rush hours. During the off-peak hours this train only runs from Alkmaar to Maastricht and back.
1400	Nachtnet	Utrecht Centraal – Amsterdam Centraal – Schiphol – Leiden Centraal – Den Haag HS – Delft – Rotterdam Centraal	VIRM, ICM	
2100	Intercity	Amsterdam Centraal – Amsterdam Sloterdijk – Haarlem – Heemstede-Aerdenhout – Leiden Centraal – Den Haag Centraal	VIRM	This train only runs until 10:00 pm and Sundays after 11:30 am.
2200	Intercity	Vlissingen - Vlissingen Souburg – Middelburg – Arnemuiden – Goes – Kapelle-Biezelinge – Kruiningen-Yerseke – Krabbendijke – Rilland-Bath – Bergen op Zoom – Roosendaal – Dordrecht – Rotterdam Blaak - Rotterdam Centraal – Schiedam Centrum – Delft - Den Haag HS - Den Haag Laan van NOI - Leiden Centraal - Heemstede-Aerdenhout - Haarlem – Amsterdam Sloterdijk – Amsterdam Centraal	VIRM	
2400	Intercity	Lelystad Centrum - Almere Buiten - Almere Centrum - Duivendrecht – Amsterdam Zuid - Schiphol Airport – Leiden Centraal - Den Haag Laan van NOI - Den Haag HS - Delft - Schiedam Centrum – Rotterdam Centraal – Rotterdam Blaak - Dordrecht	VIRM	This train only runs until 10:00 pm and Sundays after 11:30 am. This train will not stop at Lelystad Centrum and Duivendrecht during Sundays and after 8:00 pm.
3000	Intercity	Den Helder – Den Helder Zuid – Anna Paulowna – Schagen – Heerhugowaard – Alkmaar Noord – Alkmaar – Heiloo – Castricum – Zaandam – Amsterdam Sloterdijk – Amsterdam Centraal – Amsterdam Amstel – Utrecht Centraal (– Driebergen-Zeist) - Veenendaal-De Klomp – Ede-Wageningen – Arnhem Centraal – Nijmegen	VIRM	This trains stops only at Driebergen-Zeist after 9:00 pm and Sundays until 11:30 am.
3100	Intercity	Schiphol Airport – Amsterdam Zuid – Amsterdam Bijlmer ArenA – Utrecht Centraal – Driebergen-Zeist – Ede-Wageningen – Arnhem Centraal – Nijmegen	VIRM	This train only runs until 9:00 pm and Sundays after 11:30 am
3500	Intercity	Schiphol Airport – Amsterdam Zuid – Amsterdam Bijlmer ArenA – Utrecht Centraal - – 's-Hertogenbosch – Eindhoven – Weert – Roermond – Sittard – Heerlen	VIRM	This train disconnects at Eindhoven with train 13500 towards Venlo. This train runs only between Schiphol and Utrecht Centraal after 9:30 pm.
3600	Intercity	Zwolle – Deventer - Zutphen - Dieren - Arnhem Centraal - Nijmegen - Oss - 's-Hertogenbosch - Tilburg - Breda - Etten-Leur - Roosendaal	VIRM, DDZ	
3900	Intercity	Amsterdam Centraal – Amsterdam Amstel – Utrecht Centraal – 's-Hertogenbosch – Eindhoven	VIRM	This train only runs on Wednesdays. This train continues as 14500 towards Enkhuizen during rush hours.
13500	Intercity	Eindhoven - Helmond - Deurne - Horst-Sevenum - Blerick - Venlo	VIRM	This train (dis)connects at train 3500 towards Schiphol Airport at Eindhoven.
21400	Nachtnet	Rotterdam Centraal - Dordrecht - Breda - Tilburg - Eindhoven / Utrecht Centraal – 's-Hertogenbosch – Eindhoven	VIRM	This train only runs at Friday & Saturday night.

== Accidents and incidents ==
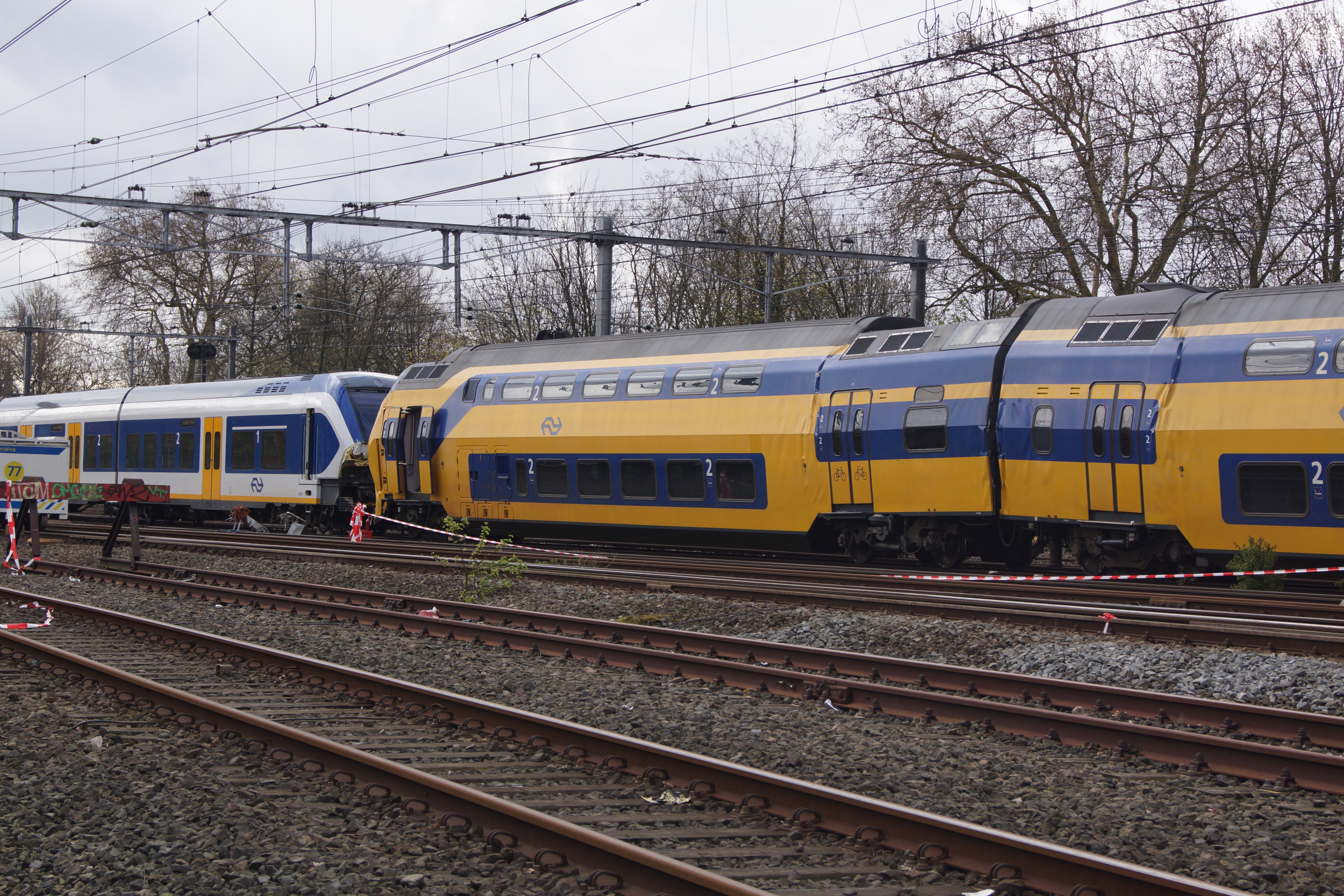
Collision involving a NS VIRM unit (right)

- On 21 April 2012, unit 8711 was one of the two trains involved in a head-on collision near Amsterdam Sloterdijk station.
- On 28 April 2017, a VIRM unit collided with a lorry on a level crossing at Wouw and was derailed.
- In July 2017 a VIRM collided with a lorry in Heiloo Forrest.
- On 4 April 2023, unit 9405 collided with a crane that was obstructing the line at Voorschoten and was derailed. One person was killed.
- On 30 October, 2025, unit 8633 collided with a lorry at a level crossing near Meteren.

== Gallery ==
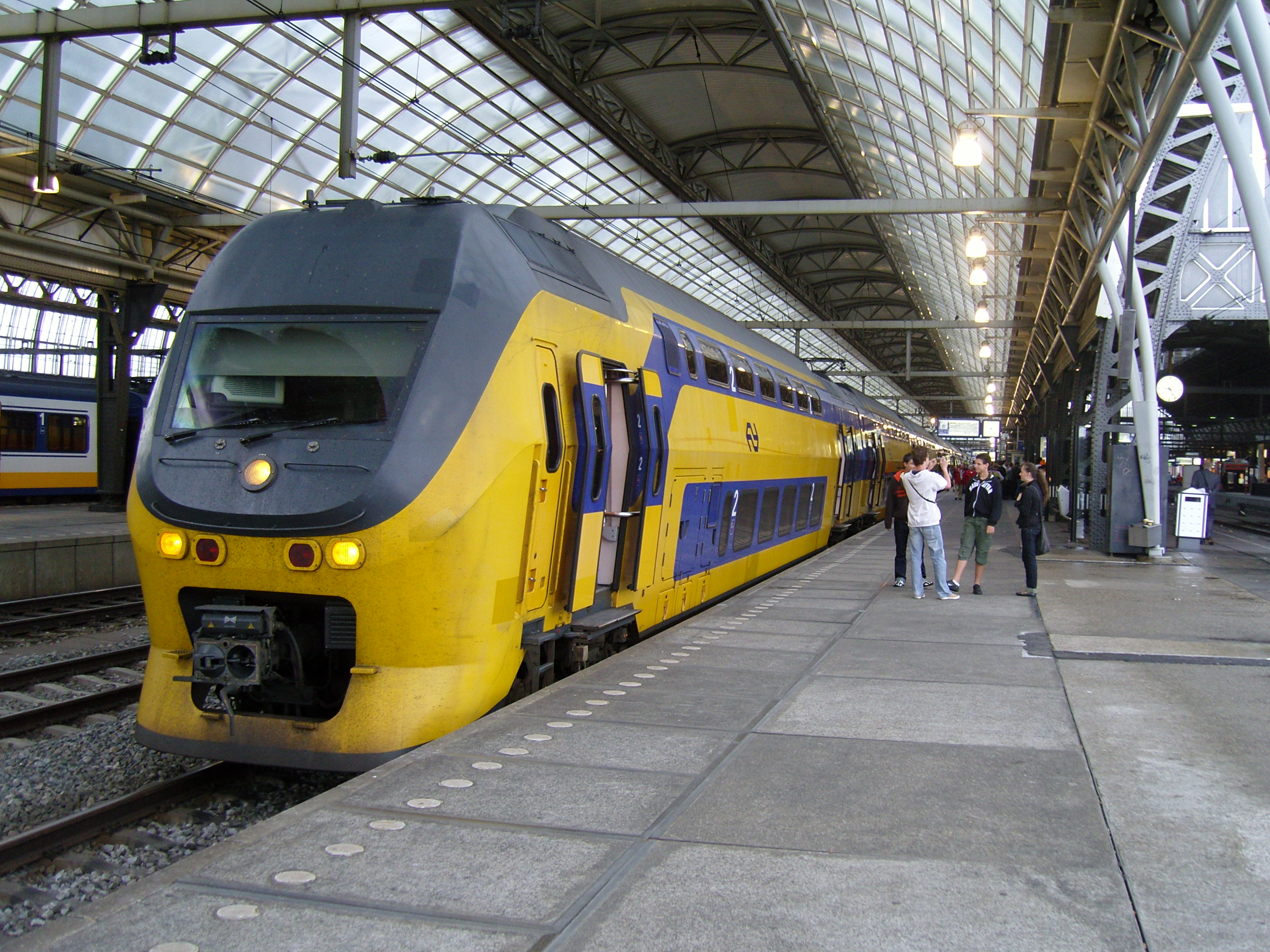
An original VIRM at Amsterdam Centraal

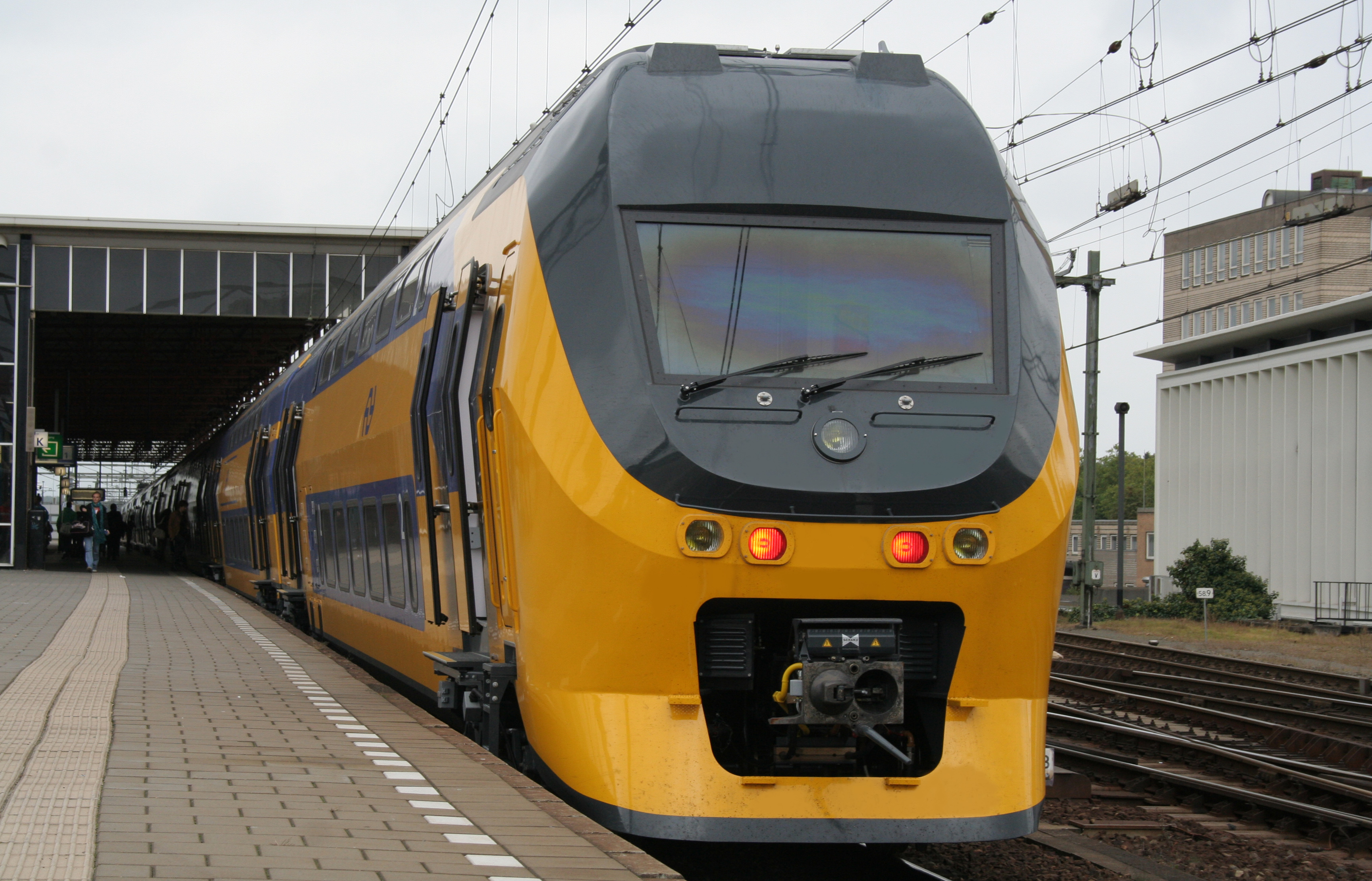
9553 at Eindhoven Centraal

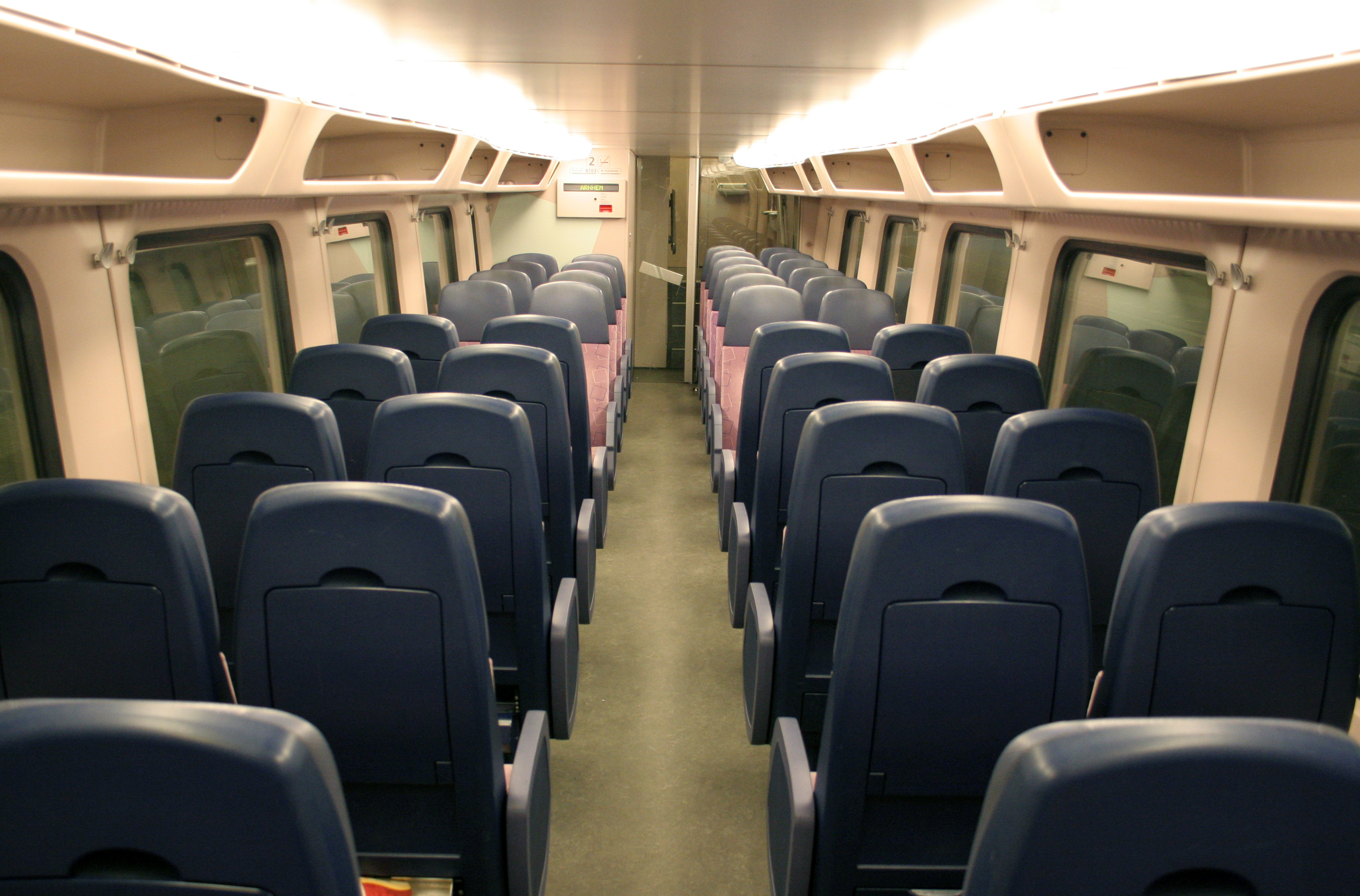
Interior of VIRM series 2 and 3 (2nd class)

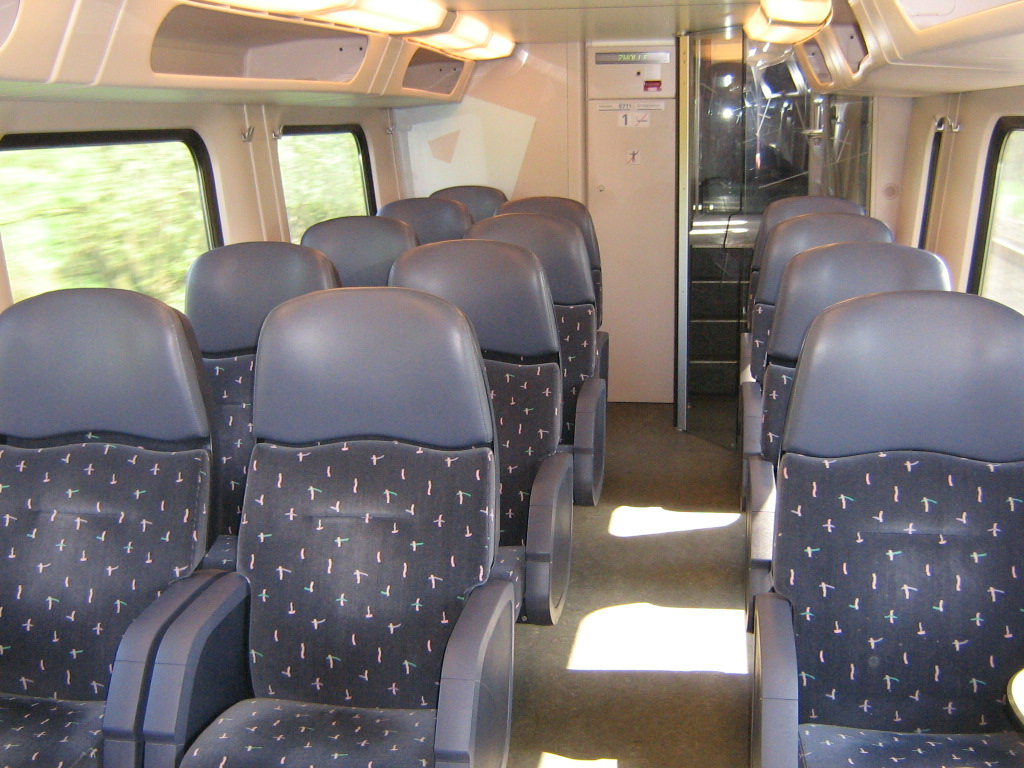
Interior of DD-IRM and VIRM series 1 (1st class)

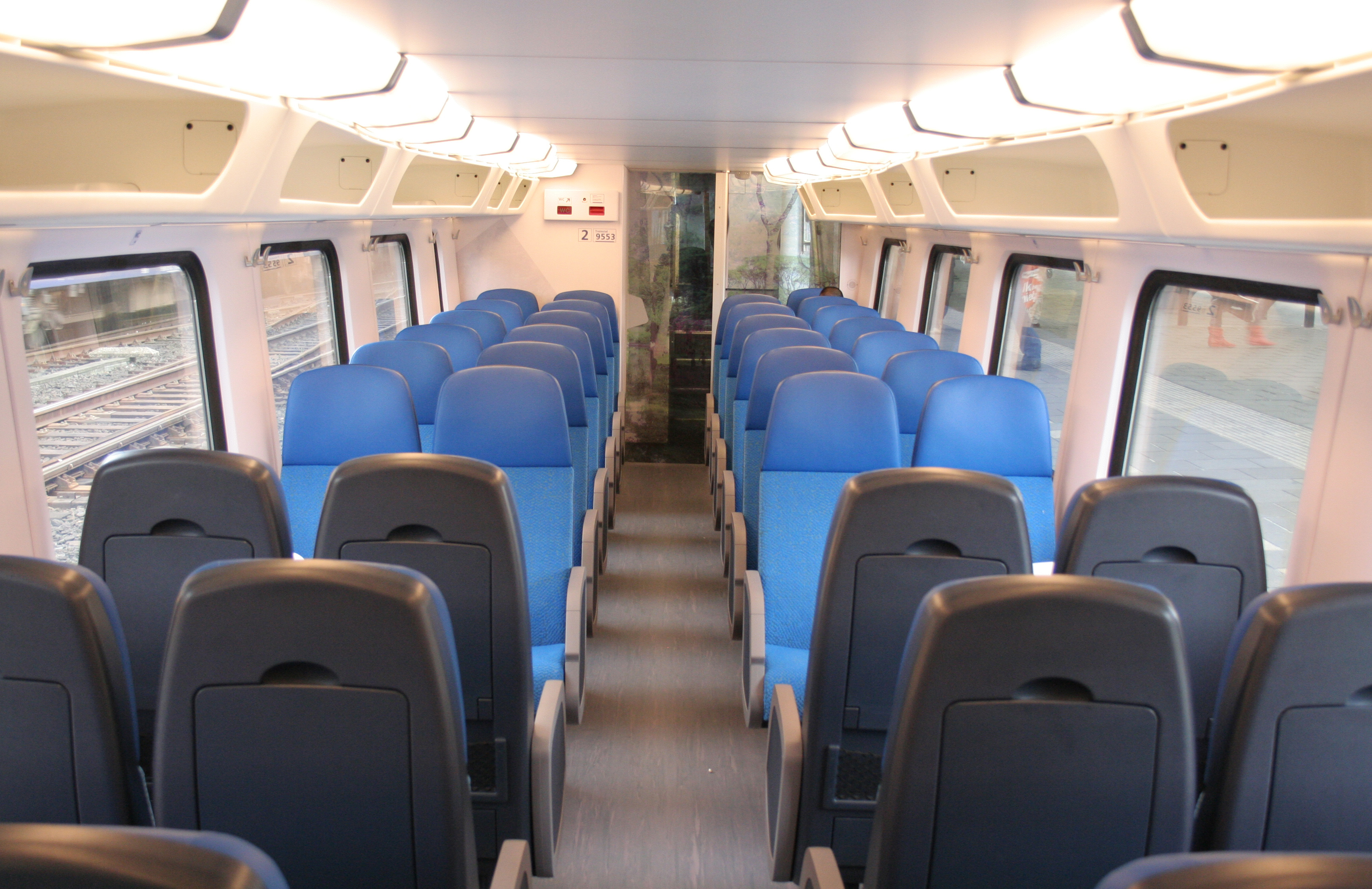
Interior of VIRM, fourth series (2nd class)

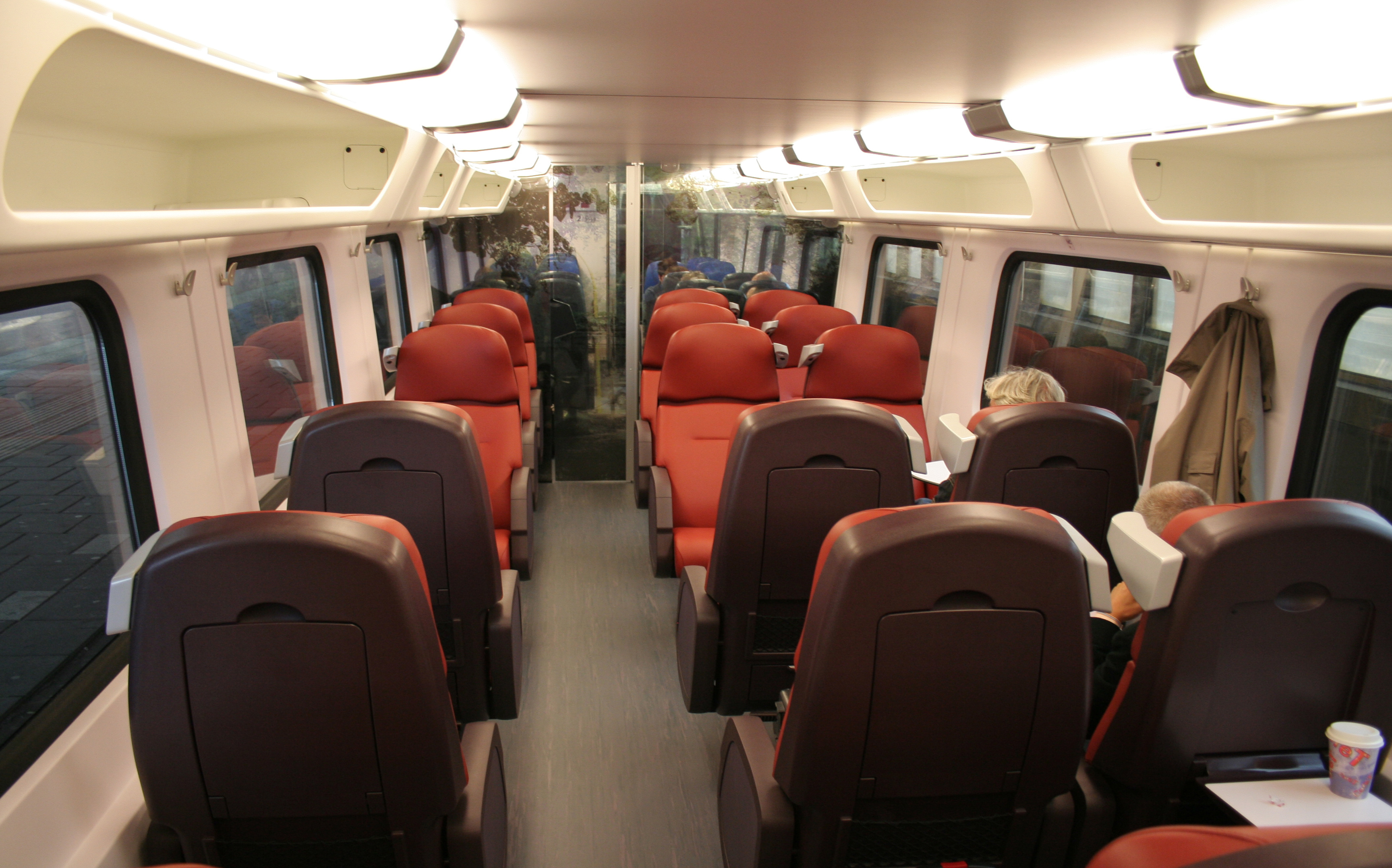
Interior of VIRM, fourth series (1st class)

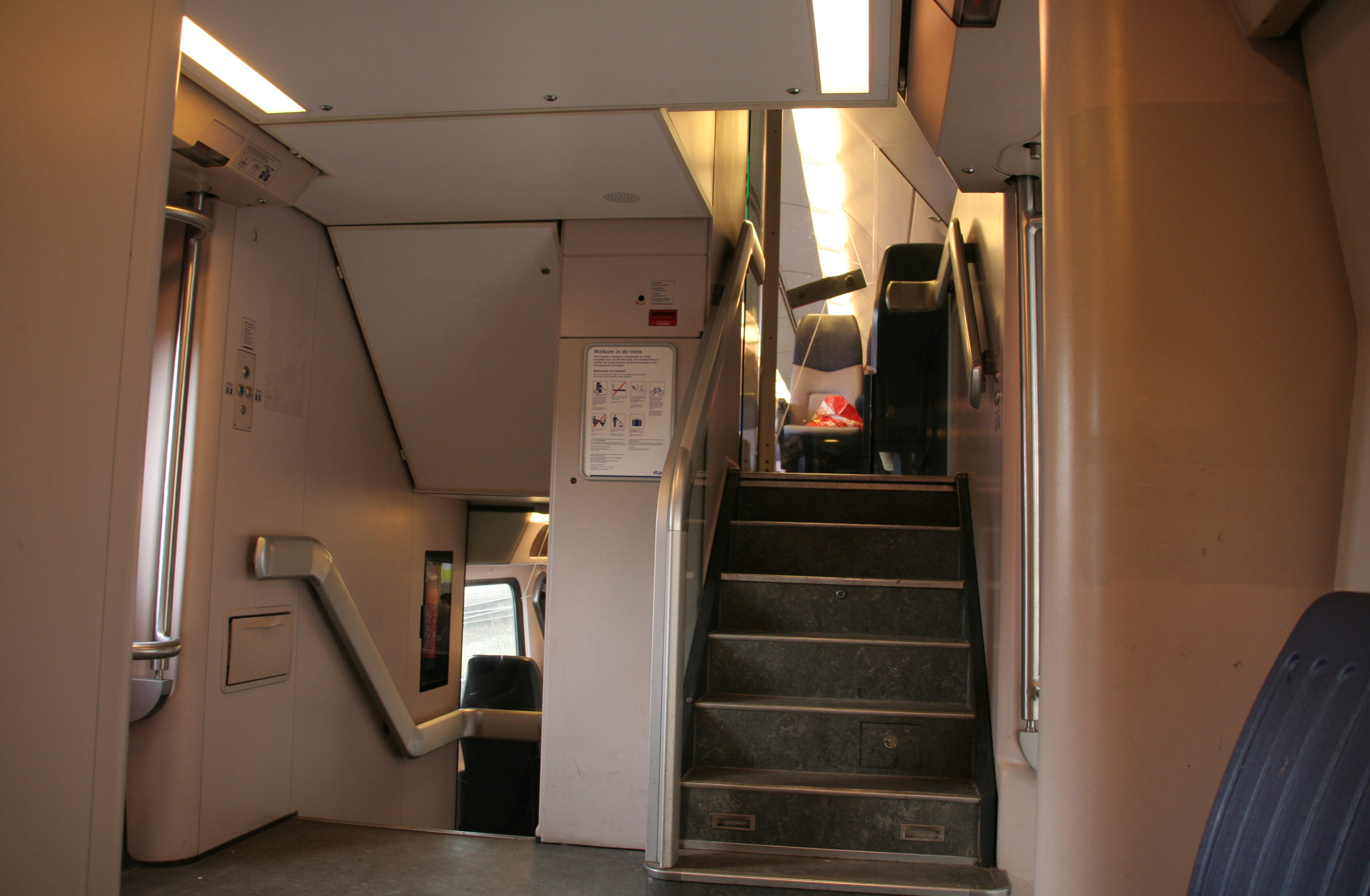
Balcony area of VIRM, series 1 (Note catering lift in the middle)

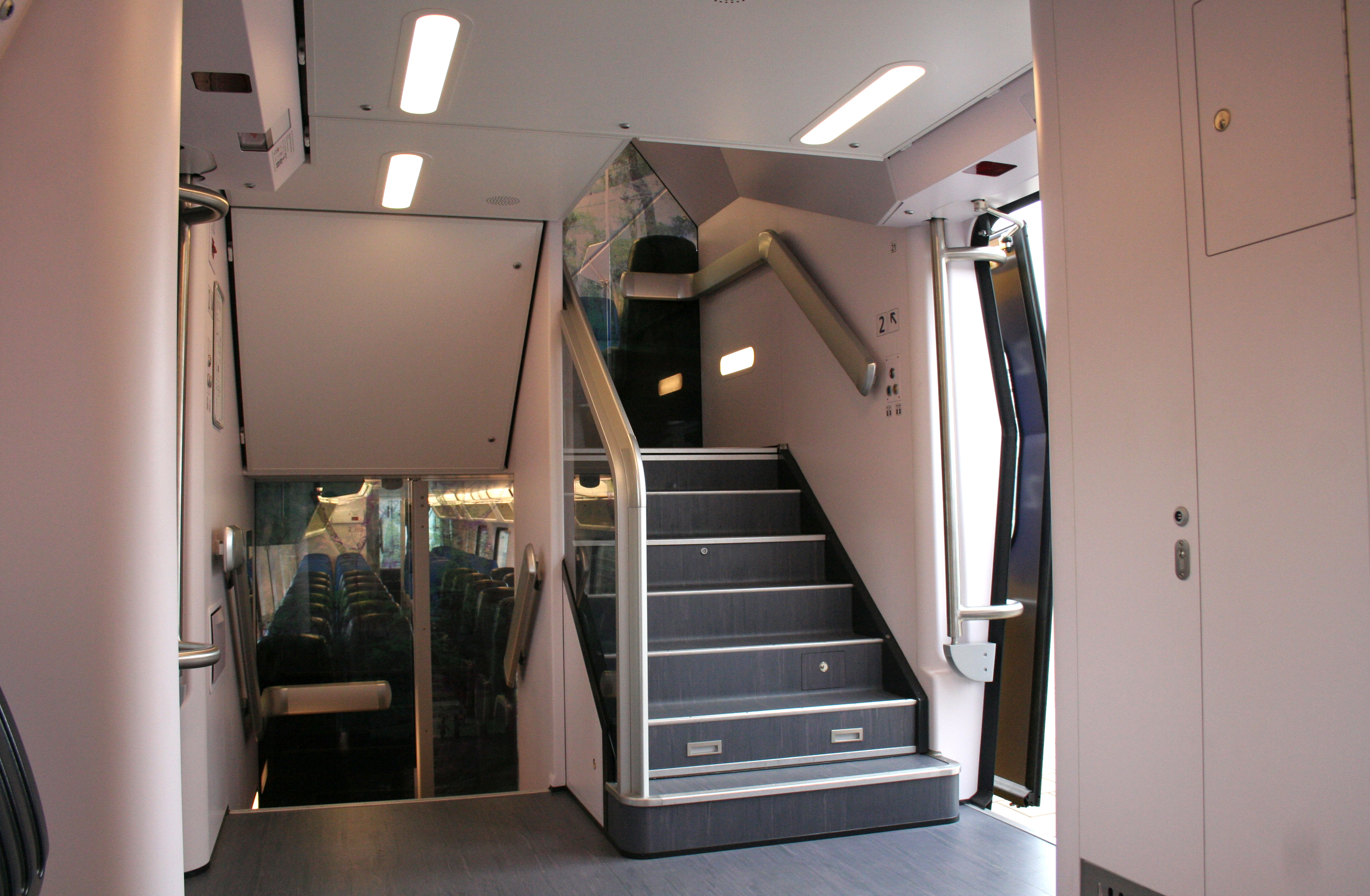
Balcony area on VIRM series 4 (Note wider stairs)

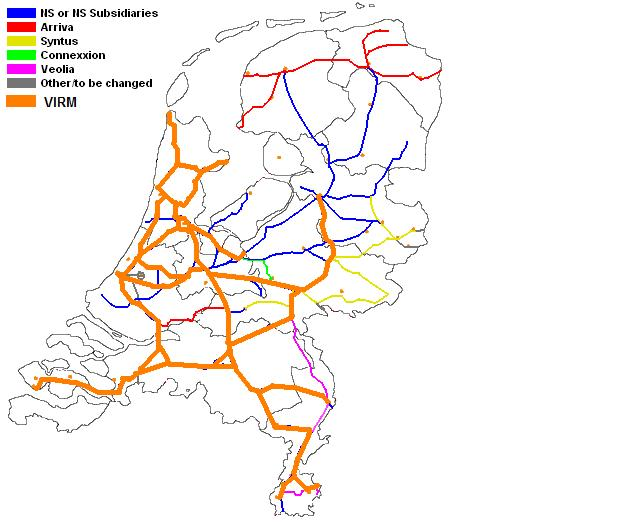
Map showing where VIRM can be seen most commonly in the 2009/10 timetable.

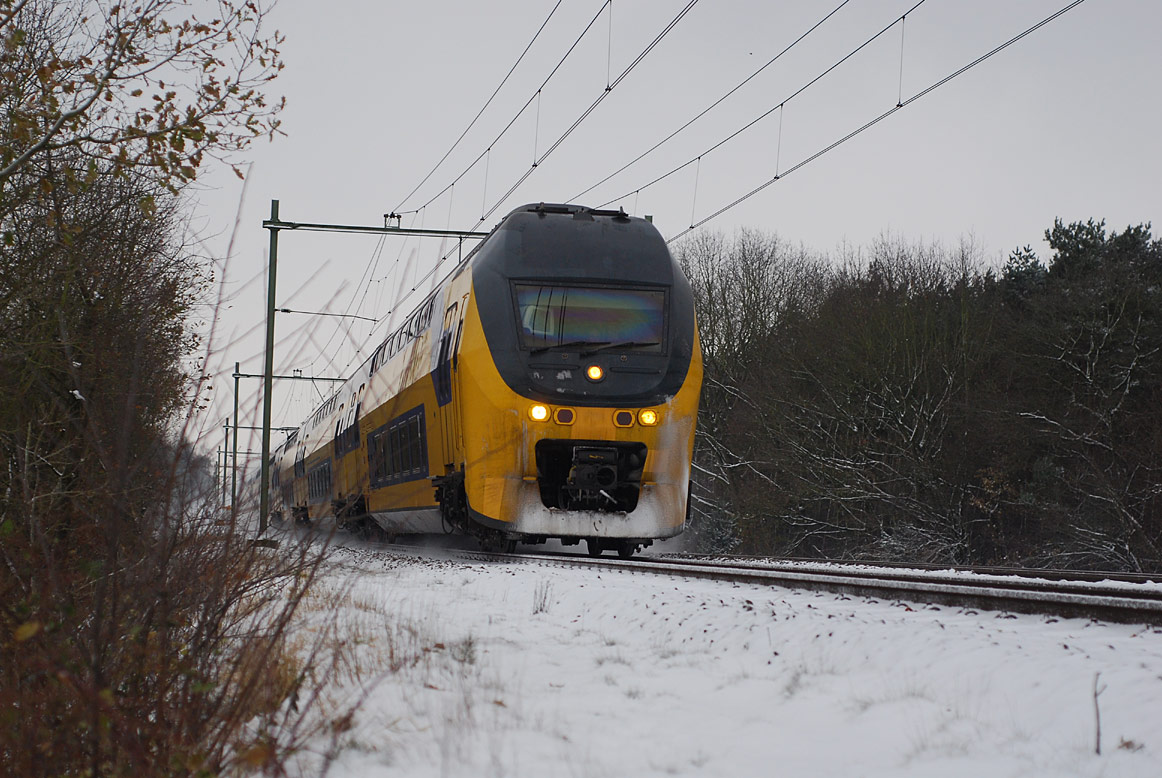

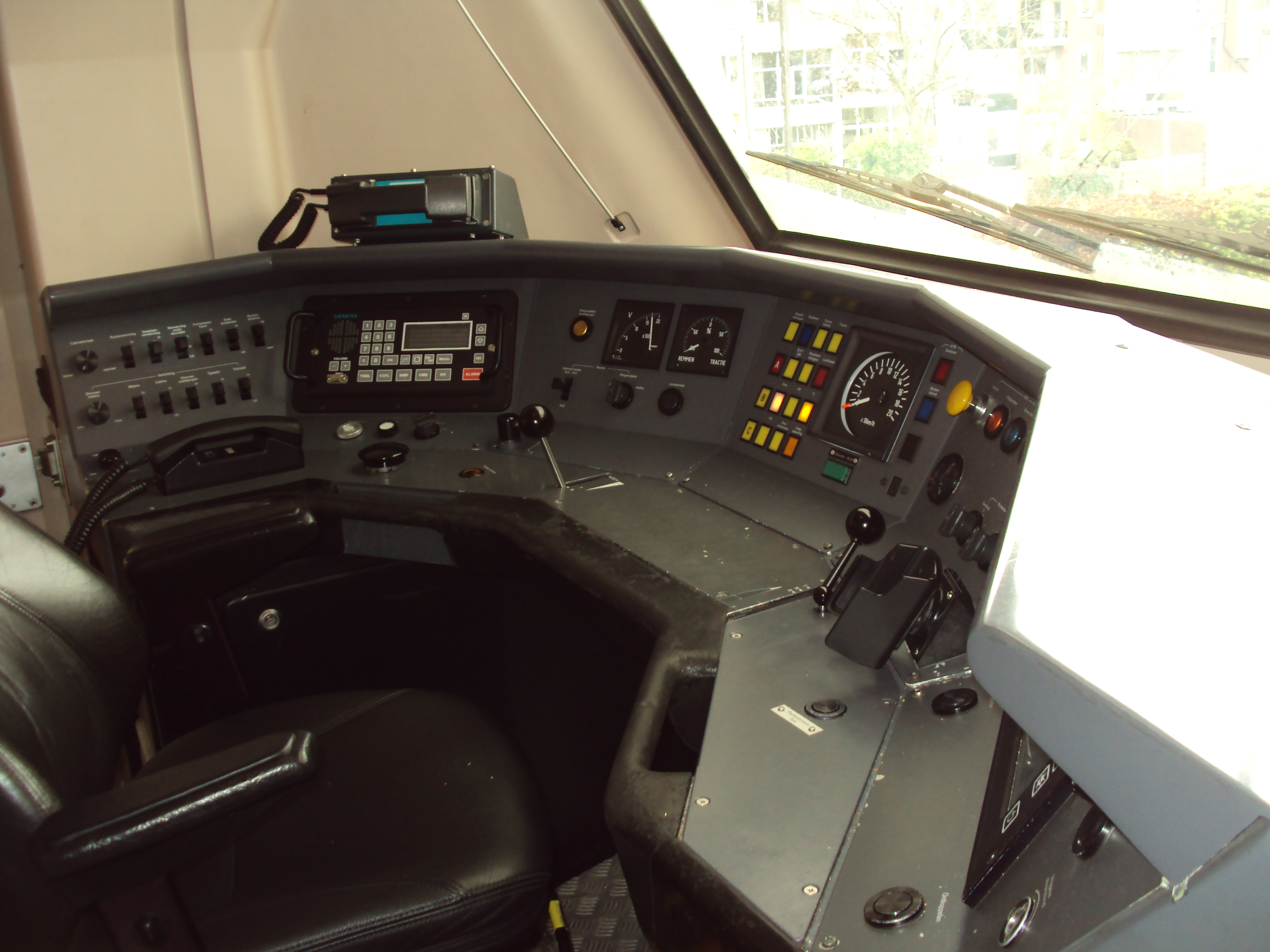
Cab view
