= Brush (disambiguation) =

A brush is a device with bristles, wire or other filaments used for cleaning, grooming, painting, etc.

Brush may also refer to:

== Brushes ==
=== Grooming and cleaning ===
- Hairbrush, a brush designed for grooming hair
- Toothbrush, a brush designed for cleaning teeth
- Toilet brush, a brush used to clean toilets

=== Applying substances ===
- Paintbrush, a brush used to apply paint or ink
- Ink brush, a brush used in East Asia for calligraphy
- Pastry brush, also known as a basting brush, a cooking utensil used to spread oil or glaze on food
- Airbrush, by analogy, a tool for spraying paint

=== Other ===
- Brush (electric), a component which conducts current between stationary wires and moving parts
- Drum brush, a type of drumstick in music

== Places ==
- Brush, Colorado, a statutory city located in eastern Morgan County, Colorado, United States
- Brush Creek (disambiguation), the name of many streams, particularly in the United States
- Brush Hill (disambiguation)
- Brush Lake (disambiguation)
- Brush Valley (disambiguation)

== Plants ==
- Underbrush, plants that live below the forest canopy
- Prunings, cuttings from small trees and shrubs
- Indian Paintbrush (disambiguation), various plants: butterfly weed, hawkweed or the genus Castilleja
- Scrubland, a plant community characterized by scrub vegetation, sometimes referred to as the brush
- Melaleuca uncinata, an Australian plant commonly known as broombush or brushwood

== Manufacturing ==
- Brush Development Company, former manufacturer of audio and phonographic equipment
- Brush Engineered Materials, a metal manufacturing company
- Brush Motor Car Company, a defunct United States automobile company
- Brush Traction, a United Kingdom locomotive manufacturer
- Brush Turbogenerators, a multi-national holding company for companies that build generators, owned by Melrose plc
- Brush Electrical Machines, a United Kingdom generator manufacturer
- Brush HMA, a Dutch generator manufacturer
- Brush SEM, a Czech generator manufacturer

== Other uses ==
- Brush (Martian crater)
- Brush (surname)
- Brush (video games), a building-block for video game levels
- USS Brush (DD-745), a United States Navy destroyer
- Basil Brush, a fictional fox on British television
- Ben Brush (1893–1918), American racehorse and sire

== See also ==
- Brushing (disambiguation)
- Scrub brush (disambiguation)
