= 9400 class =

9400 class or Class 9400 may refer to:

- GWR 9400 Class, 0-6-0PT steam locomotives
- NS Class 9400, electric multiple units
