= Sagebrush (disambiguation) =

Sagebrush is a common name of a number of shrubby plant species in the genus Artemisia native to western North America;

Or, the sagebrush steppe ecoregion, having one or more kinds of sagebrush, bunchgrasses and others;

Sagebrush could also refer to:

== Businesses and organizations ==
- Sagebrush Corporation, which produced library automation software, now owned by Follett Software
- Sagebrush Ranch, brothel in Mound House, Nevada

== Disputes ==
- Sagebrush Rebellion, a political movement
- Sagebrush War, an armed conflict

== Other uses ==
- Sagebrush School, literary movement
- Sagebrush scrub, a biome of mid to high elevation Western United States deserts
- The Nevada Sagebrush, the student-run newspaper of the University of Nevada

== See also ==
- University of Nevada Sagebrushers
- Sage (disambiguation)
- Brush (disambiguation)
