= Alkmaar Noord railway station =

Railway station in the Netherlands

Alkmaar Noord
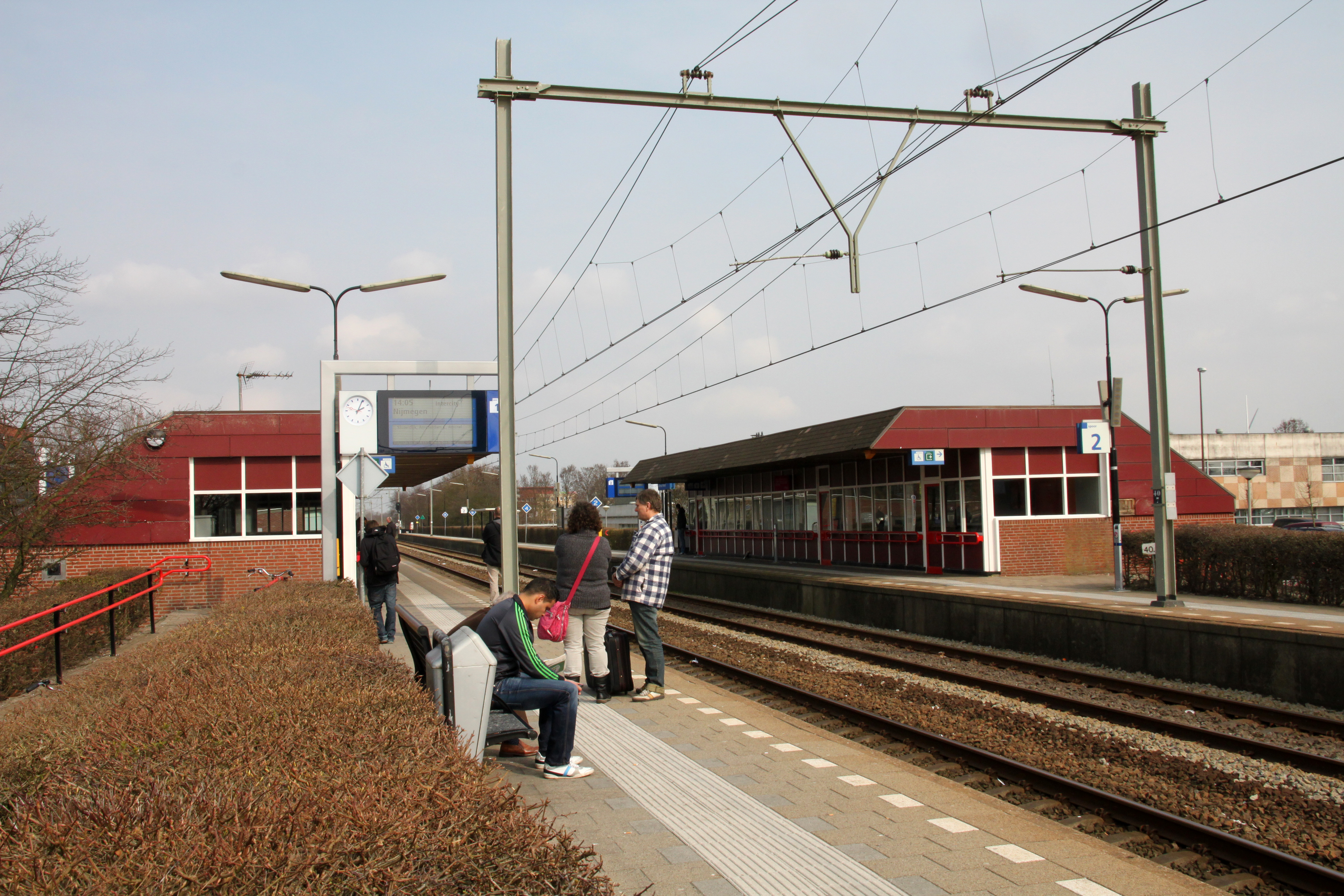
- Alkmaar Noord railway station

General information
- Location: Netherlands
- Coordinates: 52°38′38″N 4°45′53″E
- Line: Den Helder–Amsterdam railway
- Platforms: 2

History
- Opened: 26 September 1980; 46 years ago

Services
Preceding station	Nederlandse Spoorwegen	Following station
Heerhugowaard towards Den Helder	NS Intercity 2700 Peak hours only	Alkmaar towards Maastricht
Heerhugowaard towards Den Helder	NS Intercity 3000	Alkmaar towards Nijmegen
Heerhugowaard towards Hoorn	NS Sprinter 4800	Alkmaar towards Amsterdam Centraal
Location
- Location within Netherlands

Alkmaar Noord railway station is a suburban railway station in the town of Alkmaar, Netherlands. The station opened on 26 September 1980 and is located on the Den Helder–Amsterdam railway. The train services are operated by Nederlandse Spoorwegen.

== Train services ==
The station is served by the following service(s):

- 2x per hour Intercity services Schagen - Alkmaar - Amsterdam - Utrecht - Eindhoven - Maastricht (peak hours only)
- 2x per hour Intercity services Den Helder - Alkmaar - Amsterdam - Utrecht - Arnhem - Nijmegen
- 2x per hour Local services (Sprinter) Hoorn - Alkmaar - Uitgeest - Haarlem - Amsterdam

== Bus services ==
The following bus services are operated by Connexxion and call at the station.

- 3 - Daalmeer - De Mare - Noord Station - Station
- 4 - Daalmeer - Koedijk - De Mare - Vroonermeer - Noord Station - Station - Centre - MCA Hospital - Overdie
- 8 - Station - Noord Station - Beverkoog
