= Heemstede-Aerdenhout railway station =

Railway station in the Netherlands

Heemstede-Aerdenhout
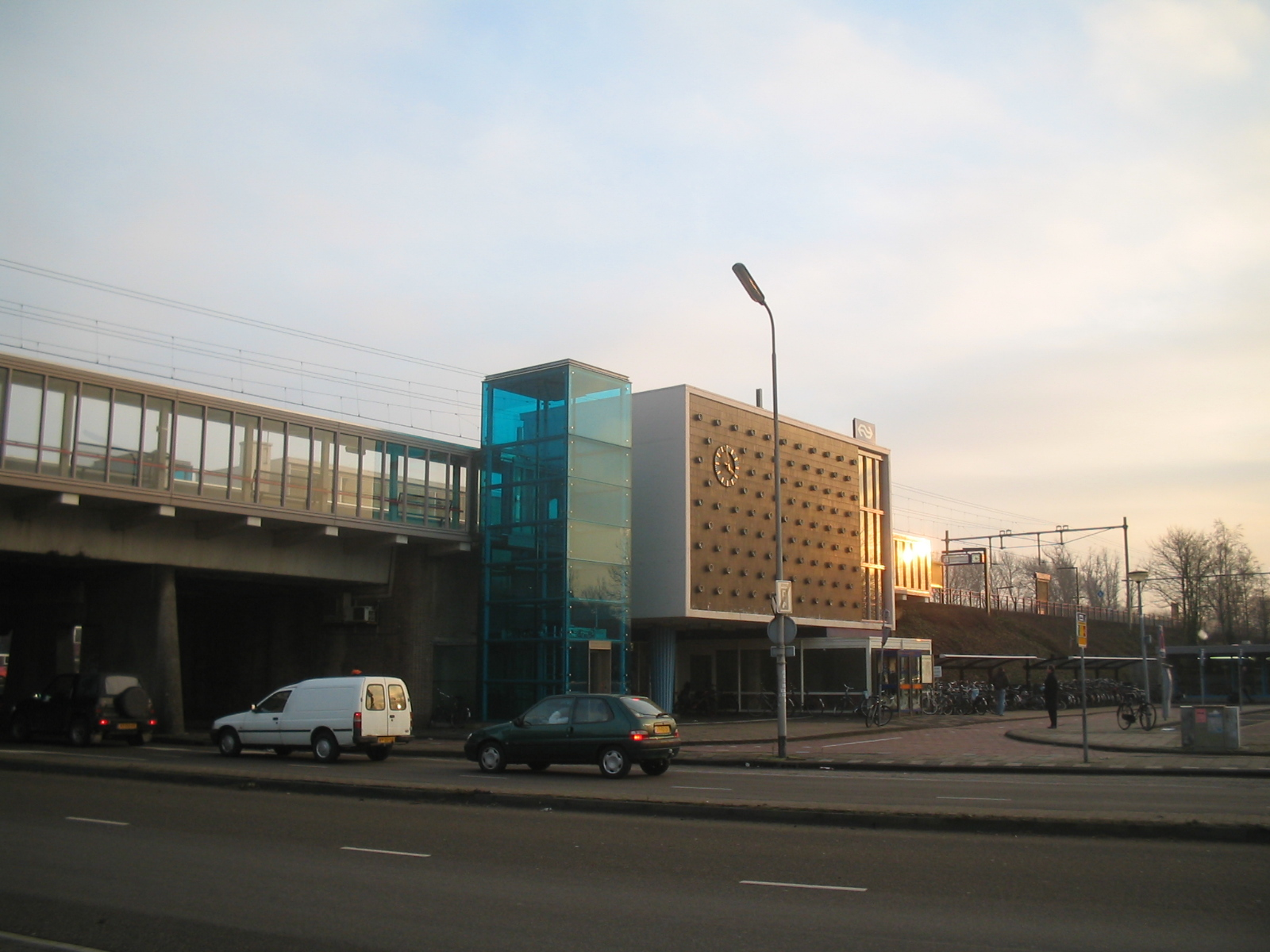

General information
- Location: Netherlands
- Coordinates: 52°21′35″N 4°36′25″E
- Line: Amsterdam–Rotterdam railway

History
- Opened: 1 October 1891, 1958 (current)

Services
| Preceding station | Nederlandse Spoorwegen | Following station |
|---|---|---|
| Leiden Centraal towards Den Haag Centraal | NS Intercity 2100 | Haarlem towards Amsterdam Centraal |
| Leiden Centraal towards Vlissingen | NS Intercity 2200 | Haarlem towards Amsterdam Centraal |
| Leiden Centraal towards Vlissingen | NS Intercity 2300 Mon-Fri until 20:00 | Haarlem towards Amsterdam Centraal |
| Hillegom towards Den Haag Centraal | NS Sprinter 6300 | Haarlem Terminus |
Location
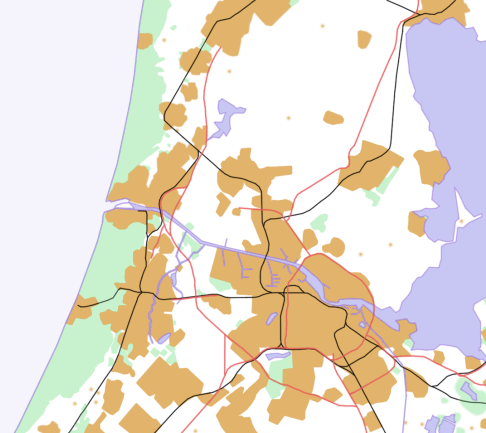
- Location within Northern Randstad Location within Netherlands

Heemstede-Aerdenhout (Dutch pronunciation: [ˌɦeːmsteːdə ˌʔaːrdə(n)ˈɦʌut]) is a railway station in Heemstede and Aerdenhout, Netherlands. The station opened on 1 October 1891 and is located on the site of the old Toll house for the Leidsevaart canal, which still flows next to the station from Haarlem to Leiden. This canal still follows the Oude Lijn (Amsterdam - Rotterdam) closely. The train soon became the favored method of travel after the station opened, and the canal has gone out of use since the end of the second world war. The current station building was opened in 1958 and was one of the first Dutch viaduct stations.

== Train services ==
As of 11 December 2016, the following train services call at this station:

| Series | Route | Frequency | Stock |
|---|---|---|---|
| Intercity 2100 | The Hague – Leiden – Heemstede-Aerdenhout – Haarlem – Amsterdam | 30 min (peak hours only) | NS VIRM |
| Intercity 2200 | Vlissingen – Roosendaal – Rotterdam – The Hague HS – Leiden – Heemstede-Aerdenhout – Haarlem – Amsterdam | 30 min | NS VIRM |
| Sprinter 6300 | The Hague – Leiden – Heemstede-Aerdenhout – Haarlem | 30 min | NS Sprinter Lighttrain |

== Bus services ==
- 3: IJmuiden - Haarlem - Schalkwijk
- 4: Heemstede De Glip - Heemstede-Aerdenhout station
- 80: Amsterdam - Haarlem - Zandvoort
- 90: Haarlem - Noordwijk - Den Haag
