= Brush (surname) =

Brush is a surname. Notable people with the surname include:

- Charles F. Brush (1849–1929), American inventor
- George de Forest Brush (1855–1941), American painter
- George Jarvis Brush (1831–1912), American mineralogist
- Henry Brush (1778–1855), American legislator
- Jared M. Brush (1814–1895), American politician, former mayor of Pittsburgh, Pennsylvania
- Joey Brush (1955–2015), American politician
- John T. Brush (1845–1912), American baseball executive
- Katharine Brush (1902–1952), American author
- Kathryn Brush, Canadian historian and distinguished professor of art history
- Paul Brush (born 1958), English footballer
- Rhys Brush, American football player
- Richard Brush (born 1984), English footballer

== See also ==
- Basil Brush, a fictional character in British children's television
- Ben Brush (1893–1918), American racehorse and sire
- Brush (disambiguation)
