= Heiloo railway station =

Railway station in the Netherlands

Heiloo
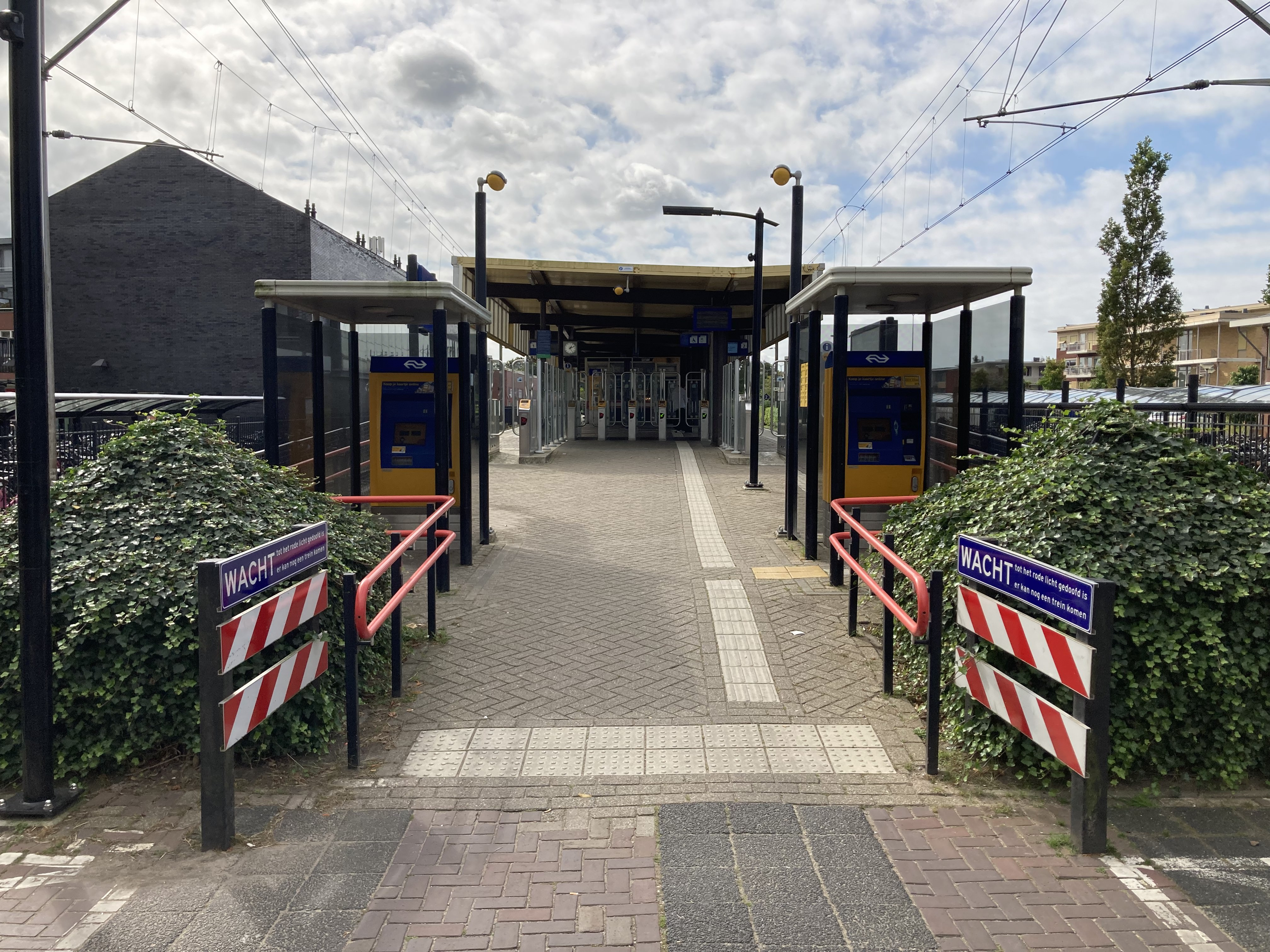
- Platform at Heiloo railway station

General information
- Location: Netherlands
- Coordinates: 52°36′0″N 4°42′3″E
- Line: Den Helder–Amsterdam railway

Other information
- Station code: Hlo

History
- Opened: 1 May 1867; 159 years ago

Services
Preceding station	Nederlandse Spoorwegen	Following station
Alkmaar towards Den Helder	NS Intercity 3000	Castricum towards Nijmegen
Alkmaar towards Hoorn	NS Sprinter 4800	Castricum towards Amsterdam Centraal
Location
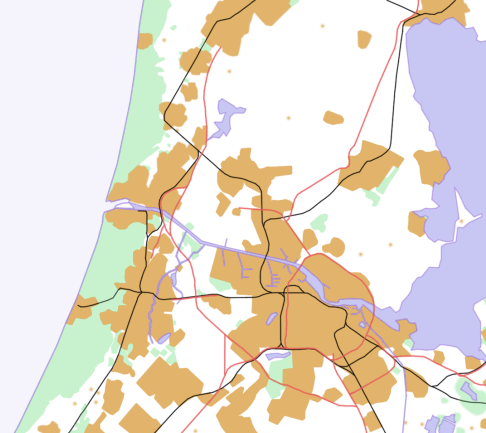
- Location within Northern Randstad Location within Netherlands

Heiloo is a railway station in Heiloo, Netherlands. The station opened on 1 May 1867. The station is on the Den Helder–Amsterdam railway.

== Train services ==
As of 26 October 2023, the following services call at Heiloo:

- 2× per hour intercity service Den Helder - Alkmaar - Amsterdam - Utrecht - Arnhem - Nijmegen
- 2× per hour local service (sprinter) Hoorn - Alkmaar - Uitgeest - Haarlem - Amsterdam

== Bus services ==
Operator	Line	Route
Connexxion	408	Heiloo - Egmond
