= Schagen railway station =

Railway station in the Netherlands

Schagen
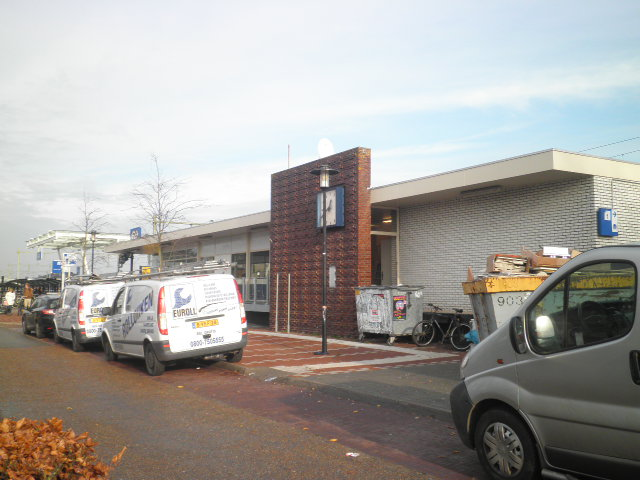
- Schagen railway station

General information
- Location: Netherlands
- Coordinates: 52°47′10″N 4°48′19″E
- Line: Den Helder–Amsterdam railway
- Platforms: 3

History
- Opened: 20 December 1865; 160 years ago

Services
Preceding station	Nederlandse Spoorwegen	Following station
Anna Paulowna towards Den Helder	NS Intercity 2700 Peak hours only	Heerhugowaard towards Maastricht
Anna Paulowna towards Den Helder	NS Intercity 3000	Heerhugowaard towards Nijmegen
Location
- Location within Netherlands

Schagen railway station serves the town of Schagen, Netherlands. The station, built by Karel Hendrik van Brederode, opened on 20 December 1865 and is located on the Den Helder–Amsterdam railway. The train services are operated by Nederlandse Spoorwegen.

The train station has 3 platforms. The line between Schagen and Den Helder is single track and between Schagen and Alkmaar double track. The track between Schagen and Heerhugowaard was also single track until 1995. In 2009 the station was modernised; some roofs were replaced and two new lifts were built.

== Train services ==
The station is served by the following service(s):

- 2x per hour Intercity services Schagen - Alkmaar - Amsterdam - Utrecht - Eindhoven - Maastricht (peak hours only)
- 2x per hour Intercity services Den Helder - Alkmaar - Amsterdam - Utrecht - Arnhem - Nijmegen

== Bus services ==
The following bus services call at the station:

Line	Route	Notes
Connexxion
150	Alkmaar - Heerhugowaard - Nieuwe Niedorp - Schagen	
152	Schagen - Callantsoog - Julianadorp	
153	Schagen - Middenmeer	
157	Alkmaar - Koedijk - Schoorldam - Warmenhuizen - Tuitjenhorn - Kalverdijk - Dirkshorn - Schagen	
406	Schagen - Tuitjehoorn	Buurtbus
411	Schagen - Tuitjehoorn	Buurtbus
416	Schagen - Kreileroord	Buurtbus
417	Schagen - Obdam	Buurtbus
