= Den Helder–Amsterdam railway =

Railway line in the Netherlands

Overview
- Status: Operational
- Locale: The Netherlands
- Termini: Den Helder railway station; Amsterdam Centraal railway station

Service
- Operator(s): Nederlandse Spoorwegen

History
- Opened: 1865-1878

Technical
- Line length: 83 km (52 mi)
- Number of tracks: single track (Den Helder–Schagen), double track (Schagen–Amsterdam)
- Track gauge: 1,435 mm (4 ft 8 1/2 in) standard gauge
- Electrification: 1.5 kV DC
Route map
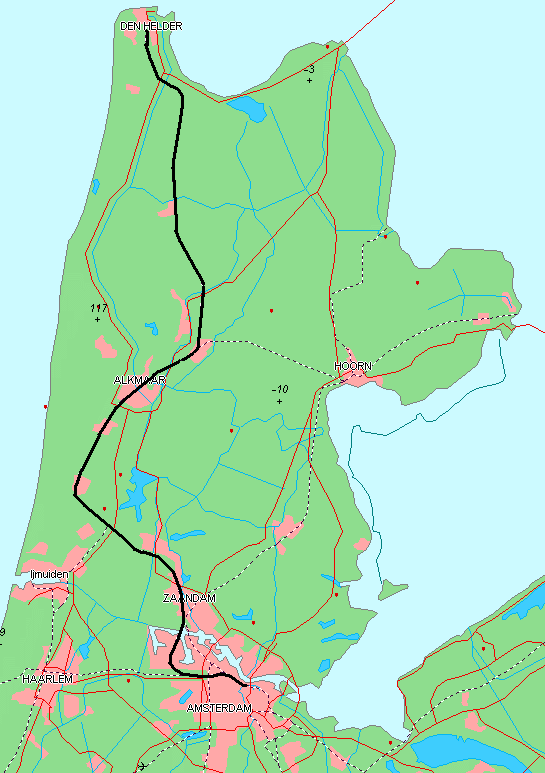

The Den Helder–Amsterdam railway is a railway line in the Netherlands running from Den Helder to Amsterdam, passing through Alkmaar and Zaandam. It is also called the Staatslijn K ("state line K") in Dutch. The line is 81 km long.

The following stations are on Staatslijn K:

- Den Helder
- Den Helder Zuid
- Anna Paulowna
- Schagen
- Heerhugowaard
- Alkmaar Noord
- Alkmaar
- Heiloo
- Castricum
- Uitgeest
- Krommenie-Assendelft
- Wormerveer
- Zaandijk Zaanse Schans
- Koog aan de Zaan
- Zaandam
- Amsterdam Sloterdijk
- Amsterdam Centraal

== History ==
The line began construction on 18 August 1860 and on 18 December 1865 the first section opened.

The sections were opened on:

- 18 December 1865 - Den Helder - Alkmaar
- 1 May 1867 - Alkmaar - Uitgeest
- 1 November 1869 - Uitgeest - Zaandam
- 15 May 1878 - Zaandam - Amsterdam Willemspoort
- 15 October 1878 - Amsterdam Willemspoort - Amsterdam Oosterdok

The line between Alkmaar and Amsterdam was electrified in 1931 and between Den Helder and Alkmaar in 1958.

The following stations were opened at the same time as the sections of the line were opened:

- Den Helder
- Anna Paulowna
- Schagen
- Noord Scharwoude
- Heerhugowaard
- Alkmaar
- Castricum
- Uitgeest
- Krommenie-Assendelft
- Wormerveer
- Zaandijk Zaanse Schans
- Zaandam
- Amsterdam Westerdok
