= Brush Lake =

Brush Lake may refer to:

- Brush Lake, Boundary County, Idaho; a lake of Idaho
- Brush Lake (Berrien County, Michigan)
- Brush Lake (South Dakota)
- Brush Lake (North Dakota/Saskatchewan), an international lake of North America
- Brush Lake State Park, Montana
