= Anna Paulowna railway station =

Railway station in the Netherlands

Anna Paulowna
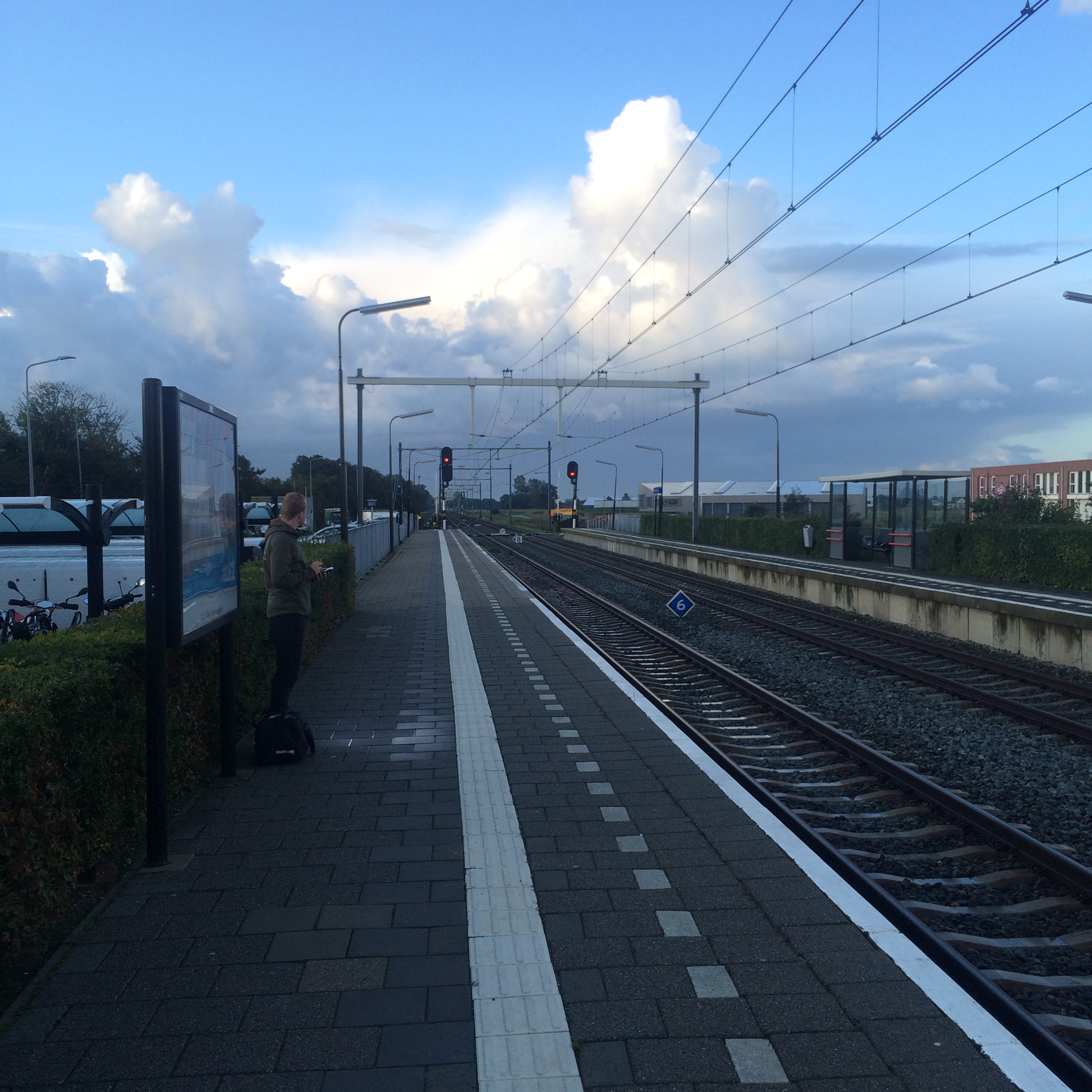

General information
- Location: Netherlands
- Coordinates: 52°52′1″N 4°48′40″E
- Line: Den Helder–Amsterdam railway

History
- Opened: 20 December 1865; 160 years ago

Services
Preceding station	Nederlandse Spoorwegen	Following station
Den Helder Zuid towards Den Helder	NS Intercity 2700 Peak hours only	Schagen towards Maastricht
Den Helder Zuid towards Den Helder	NS Intercity 3000	Schagen towards Nijmegen
Location
- Location within Netherlands

Anna Paulowna railway station serves the town of Anna Paulowna, Netherlands. The station opened on 20 December 1865 and the station is on the Den Helder–Amsterdam railway. In 1971 a new building, by architect C. Douma, replaced the old one. The train services are operated by Nederlandse Spoorwegen.

== Train services ==
The station is served by the following trains:

- 2x per hour Intercity trains Den Helder - Amsterdam - Utrecht - Arnhem - Nijmegen

== Bus services ==
Buses on the following routes stop at Anna Paulowna NS:

Line	Route
Connexxion
158	Den Helder - Anna Paulowna - Den Oever Bus Station
416	Schagen - Anna Paulowna - Kreileroord
708	Anna Paulowna - Oudesluis
709	Anna Paulowna - Wieringerwaard
