= Hillegom railway station =

Railway station in South Holland, Netherlands

Hillegom
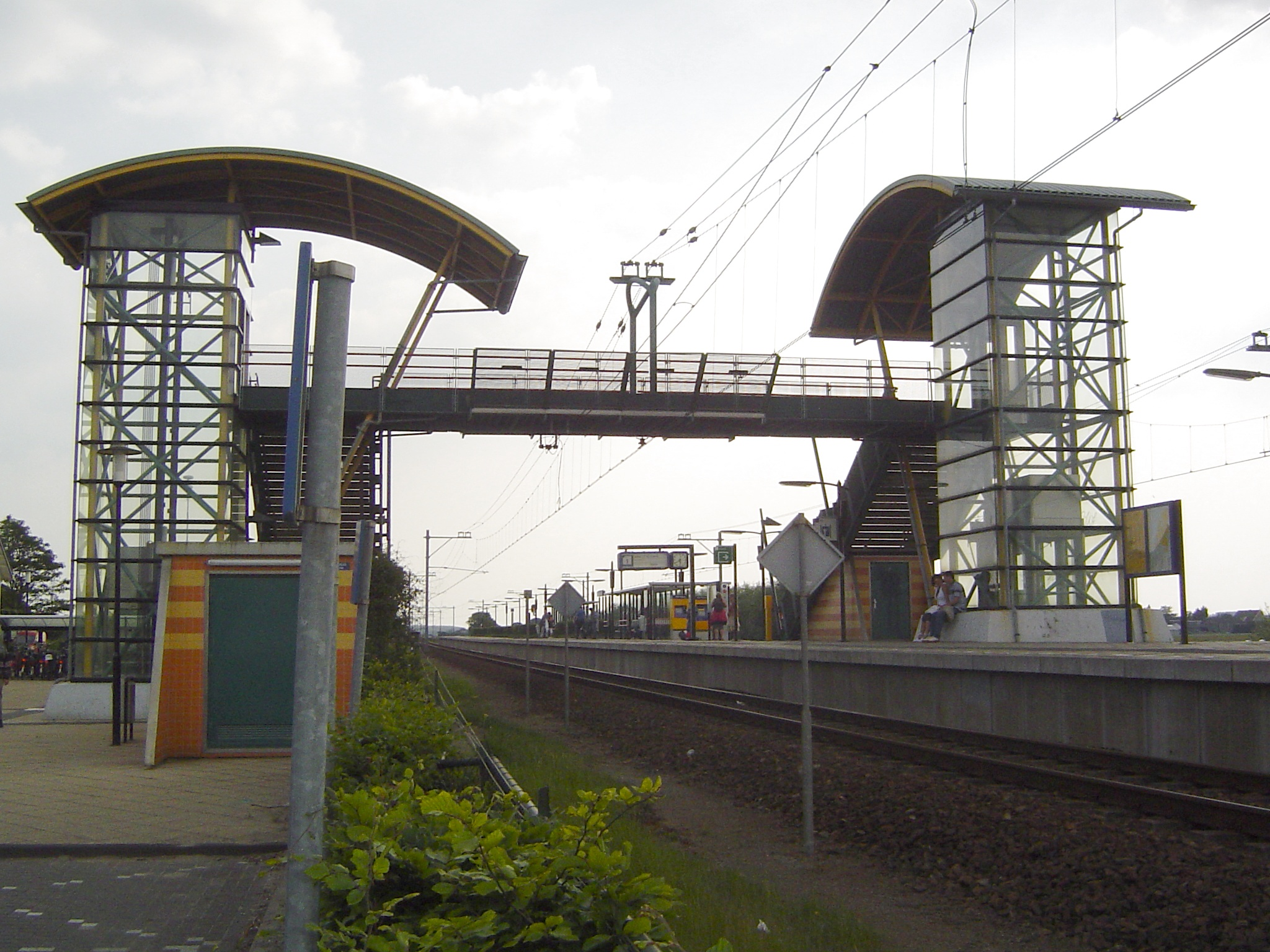

General information
- Location: Netherlands
- Coordinates: 52°18′10″N 4°33′57″E
- Operator: Nederlandse Spoorwegen
- Line: Amsterdam–Rotterdam railway
- Platforms: 1
- Tracks: 2

Other information
- Station code: Hil

History
- Opened: 1898, reopened 2000
- Closed: 1944

Services
Preceding station	Nederlandse Spoorwegen	Following station
Voorhout towards Den Haag Centraal	NS Sprinter 6300	Heemstede-Aerdenhout towards Haarlem
Location
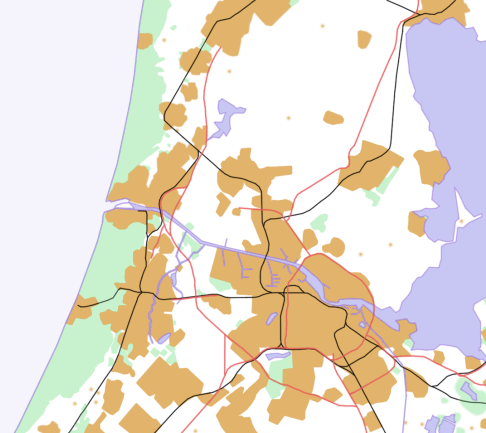
- Location within Northern Randstad Location within Netherlands

The railway station of Hillegom in the Netherlands is located on the railway line between Haarlem and Leiden.

The first railway station in the town was opened in 1891, closed in 1898 and torn down in 1900. A second railway station was opened on a different location in 1898, when the first was closed. It was designed by the architect D.A.N. Margadant. The freight tracks on the railway station were used to transport flowers from the nearby fields to i.a. the flower auction in Aalsmeer. During World War II, these tracks were used by the Germans, making it a prominent target for allied bombings. The passenger railway station was closed as a result of this on 17 September 1944. The freight tracks remained in use until the 1980s.

The railway station was reopened on 28 May 2000, on the same location as the second railway station.

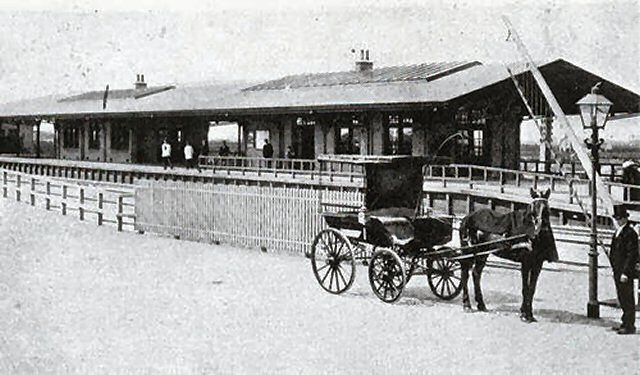
Hillegom railway station in 1900

== Train services ==
As of 11 December 2016, the following train services call at this station:

- 2x per hour local service (sprinter) The Hague - Leiden - Haarlem
