= Heerhugowaard railway station =

Railway station in Heerhugowaard, Netherlands

Heerhugowaard
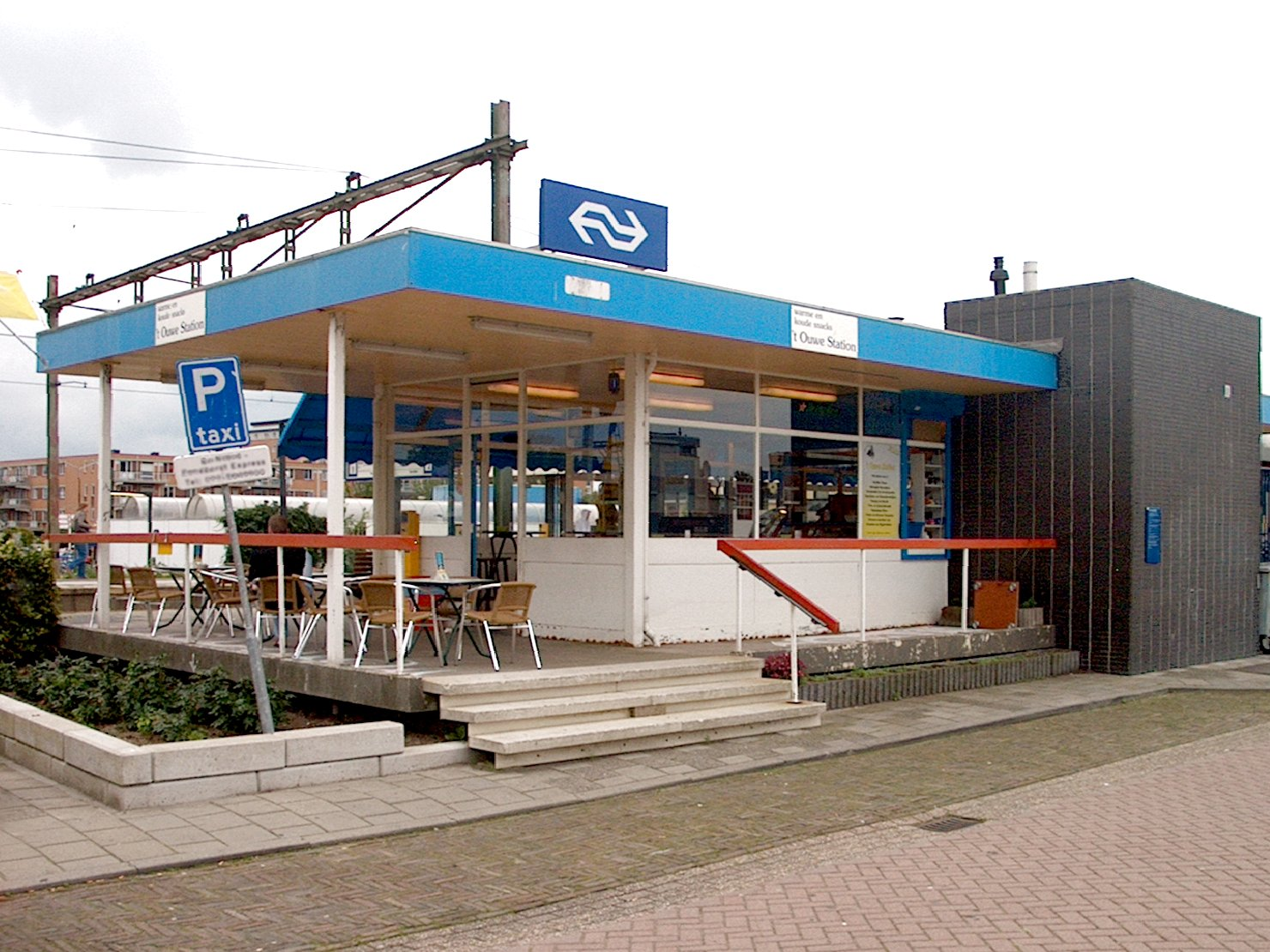
- Heerhugowaard railway station

General information
- Location: Heerhugowaard, Netherlands
- Coordinates: 52°40′12″N 4°49′25″E
- Lines: Den Helder–Amsterdam railway Heerhugowaard–Hoorn railway
- Platforms: 3

History
- Opened: 20 December 1865; 160 years ago

Services
Preceding station	Nederlandse Spoorwegen	Following station
Schagen towards Den Helder	NS Intercity 2700 Peak hours only	Alkmaar Noord towards Maastricht
Schagen towards Den Helder	NS Intercity 3000	Alkmaar Noord towards Nijmegen
Obdam towards Hoorn	NS Sprinter 4800	Alkmaar Noord towards Amsterdam Centraal
Location
- Location within Netherlands

Heerhugowaard (Dutch: [ˌɦeːrɦyɣoːˈʋaːrt]) is a railway station which serves the towns of Heerhugowaard and Broek op Langedijk, Netherlands. The station opened on 20 December 1865 and is located on the Den Helder–Amsterdam railway and Heerhugowaard–Hoorn railway. The train services are operated by Nederlandse Spoorwegen (NS).

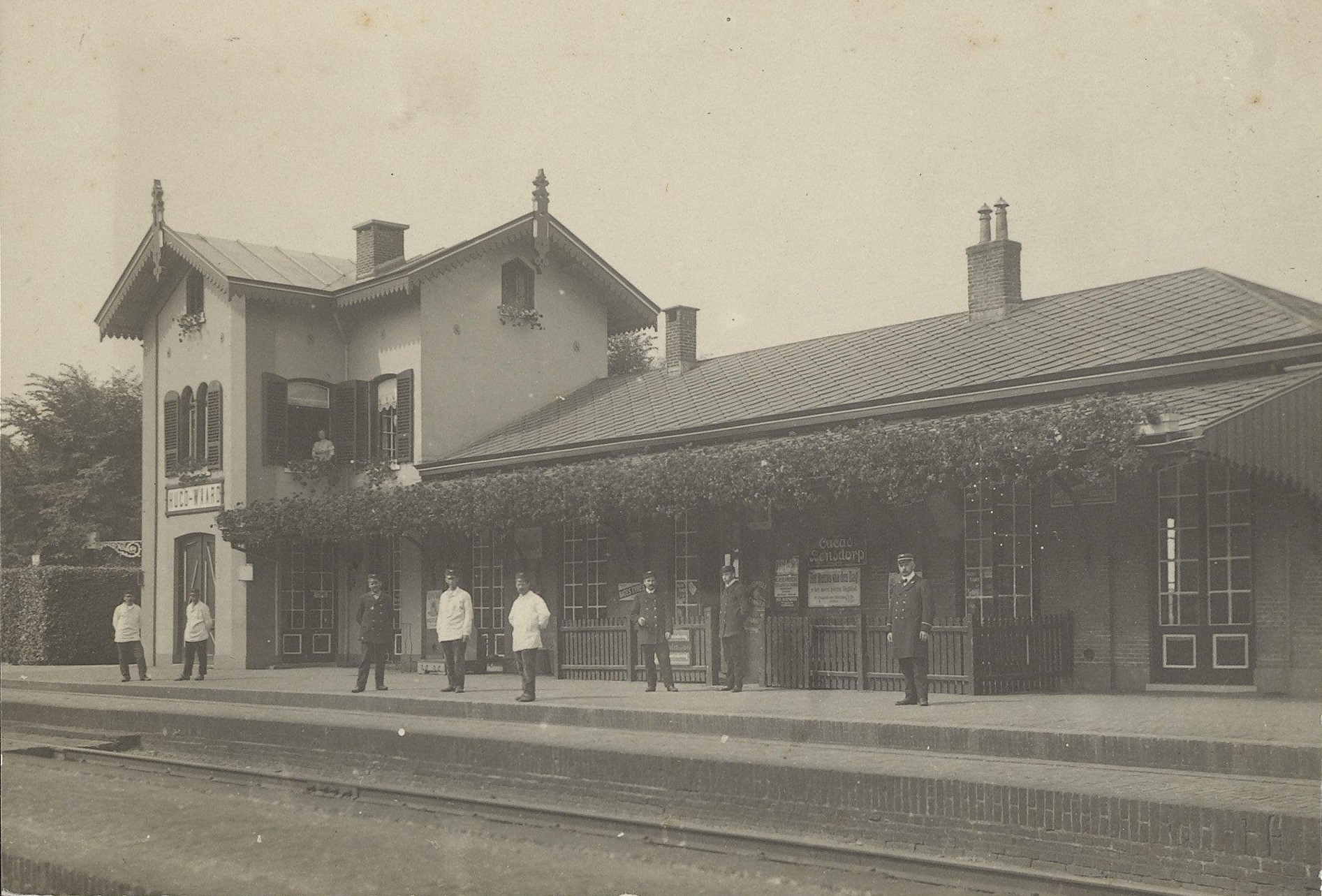
View of the former station, circa 1880

The station was known as Heerhugowaard-Broek op Langedijk between 1948 and 1976. The station has 3 platforms and a station building. The previous station buildings were used between 1862 and 1967, when it was demolished, and also a building from 1967 to 1989 and is now being used as a snackbar.

In December 2023, the station was renovated, with the third platform track was removed and station furniture being renewed. In 2024, the station saw the beginning the construction of the Zuidtangent railway underpass.

== Train services ==
The station is served by the following service(s):

- 2x per hour Intercity services Schagen - Alkmaar - Amsterdam - Utrecht - Eindhoven - Maastricht (peak hours only)
- 2x per hour Intercity services Den Helder - Alkmaar - Amsterdam - Utrecht - Arnhem - Nijmegen
- 2x per hour Local services (Sprinter) Hoorn - Alkmaar - Uitgeest - Haarlem - Amsterdam

== Bus services ==
The following bus services are operated by Connexxion and call at the station.

- 162 - Heerhugowaard - Alkmaar
- 407 - Heerhugowaard - Broek op Langedijk - Zuid Scharwoude - Noord Scharwoude - Heerhugowaard
- 409 - Heerhugowaard - Rustenburg - Ursem - Hensbroek - Obdam
