= Scrub brush =

Scrub brush or scrubbrush may refer to:

- Shrubland, an environmental habitat characterized by vegetation dominated by shrubs
- Silkworm (missile), a missile with the NATO reporting name "Scrubbrush"
- Tawashi, a Japanese traditional scrubbing brush
- Toilet brush, a scrubbing brush for cleaning toilets
