= Brush Hill (disambiguation) =

Brush Hill can refer to:

- Brush Hill, a historic mansion in Pennsylvania
- Brush Hill, Alberta, a community in Canada
- Brush Hill Historic District, in Massachusetts
- Brush Hill Local Nature Reserve, in Buckinghamshire, England
