= Brush Lake (Berrien County, Michigan) =

- Location within Michigan
- Location: Berrien County, Michigan
- Coordinates: 41°59′11″N 86°13′37″W
- Type: Lake
- Surface area: 54.311 acres (21.979 ha)
- Surface elevation: 758 feet (231 m)

Brush Lake is a lake in Berrien County, in the U.S. state of Michigan. The lake is 54.311 acres (21.979 ha) in size.

Brush Lake was named for the brush in the area.
