= Indian Paintbrush =

Indian Paintbrush may refer to:

- Indian Paintbrush (company), American film production company
- Indian Paintbrush Book Award, award given annually to books nominated and voted on by children in Wyoming
- Castilleja, a genus of annual and perennial herbaceous plants
- Butterfly weed (Asclepias tuberosa), North American milkweed
- Hawkweed (Hieracium)
