= Den Helder Zuid railway station =

Railway station in the Netherlands

Station Den Helder Zuid
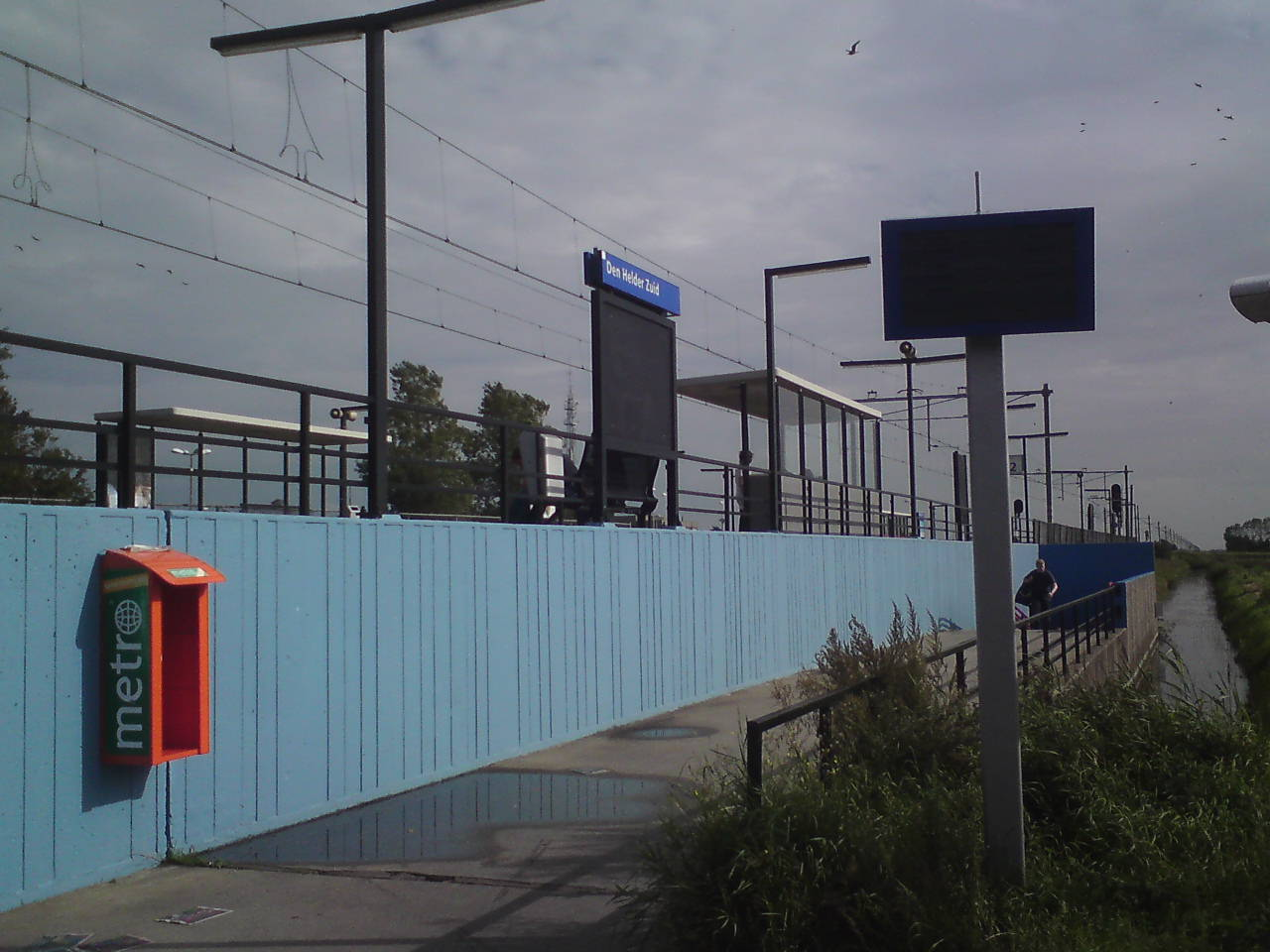

General information
- Location: Netherlands
- Coordinates: 52°55′59″N 4°45′50″E
- Line: Den Helder–Amsterdam railway

History
- Opened: 31 May 1980; 46 years ago

Services
Preceding station	Nederlandse Spoorwegen	Following station
Den Helder Terminus	NS Intercity 2700 Peak hours only	Anna Paulowna towards Maastricht
Den Helder Terminus	NS Intercity 3000	Anna Paulowna towards Nijmegen
Location
- Location within Netherlands

Den Helder Zuid railway station (English: Den Helder South) serves the town of Den Helder, Netherlands. The station opened on 31 May 1980 and is located on the Den Helder–Amsterdam railway. The train services are operated by Nederlandse Spoorwegen. The station has two platforms, of which only one is in use for both directions.

== Train services ==
The station is served by the following service(s):

- 2x per hour Intercity services Den Helder - Amsterdam - Utrecht - Arnhem - Nijmegen.

== Bus services ==
These services stop outside the station. For timetables see.

Line	Route
Connexxion
30	Den Helder station - Noordwest Ziekenhuis Den Helder - Nieuw-Den Helder - Den Helder Zuid station - Julianadorp
31	Den Helder station - Den Helder center - Noordwest Ziekenhuis Den Helder - Nieuw-Den Helder - Oud Den Helder - Den Helder Zuid station
