= Brush Valley =

Brush Valley may refer to:

- Brush Valley Township, Indiana County, Pennsylvania
- Brush Valley, Pennsylvania, an unincorporated community
- Brush Valley (Pennsylvania), a valley
