= Brushing =

Brushing may refer to:

- Tooth brushing, personal hygiene
- Hair brushing, personal grooming
- Wire brushing, abrasive tool technique
- Brushing, in horse grooming
- Brushing and linking, in data visualization
- Endobronchial brushing, tissue sampling in bronchoscopy
- Brushing (e-commerce), a scamming technique
