= Brush HMA =

Brush HMA is a manufacturer of large generators for gas turbine and steam turbine drive applications, based at Ridderkerk in the Netherlands.

== History ==
The business began back in November 1882 when two young Dutch entrepreneurs, Adriaan Pot and Willem Smit established a company called Elektrisch Licht-Machinen Fabriek Willem Smit & Co.. Later, the name changed to Smit Slikkerveer. In the early days, the company manufactured various electrical products including dynamos and lighting equipment. This was followed by direct current (DC) and alternating current (AC) electric motors, generators, drives and transformers.

In 1962, following a merger between Smit Slikkerveer and the dominant Heemaf Hengelo along with several other companies, the new name of Samenwerkende Elektrotechische Fabrieken Holec N.V. was created. During the 1980s, the company, which was simply known as Holec Machines and Apparaten (HOLEC), was suffering from failing business due to downturns and changes in old industries, such as the shipbuilding industry. The resulting economics required more restructuring to meet the uncertainty.

In 1989, the Holec Machines and Appararten business along with associated sister companies were taken over by the Royal Begemann Group, which provided considerable capital investment for the new plants, and equipment required to keep the divisions viable and competitive in a global marketplace. It also allowed Holec to move further into traction electrical machines.

In March 1998, the division of what had been the old Smit Slikkerveer was split into two smaller but focussed business units, HMA Power Systems and Traxis BV. Traxis BV focussed on traction control equipment whereas the larger HMA Power Systems concentrated on its core business of medium to large AC generators, DC traction motors, associated control equipment, and service and repair work.

Early in 2000, HMA Power Systems was purchased outright by FKI plc which was in turn purchased by private equity company Melrose plc in 2008. It is now part of the larger group Brush Turbo Generators, the Brush HMA element of which currently employs approximately three hundred fifty staff across its range of manufacturing shops, design and development offices.

== Facilities ==
The Brush HMA manufacturing plant is located adjacent to the river, north of Ridderkerk, near Rotterdam in the Netherlands.

The Brush HMA plant at Ridderkerk, not to be confused with the other Holec Ridderkerk enterprise that became part of France's Alstom, has manufactured many different types of electrical machines and associated equipment over the last one hundred twenty years. Today its core business is centred on the manufacture of medium-sized four pole turbo-generators (Brush Turbogenerator Division centre of excellence), AC traction motors and service and repair of electrical machines. In the four pole turbogenerator range, the principal product is the DG range, which is sold globally to all major oil and gas companies.
