= Den Helder railway station =

Railway station in the Netherlands

Den Helder
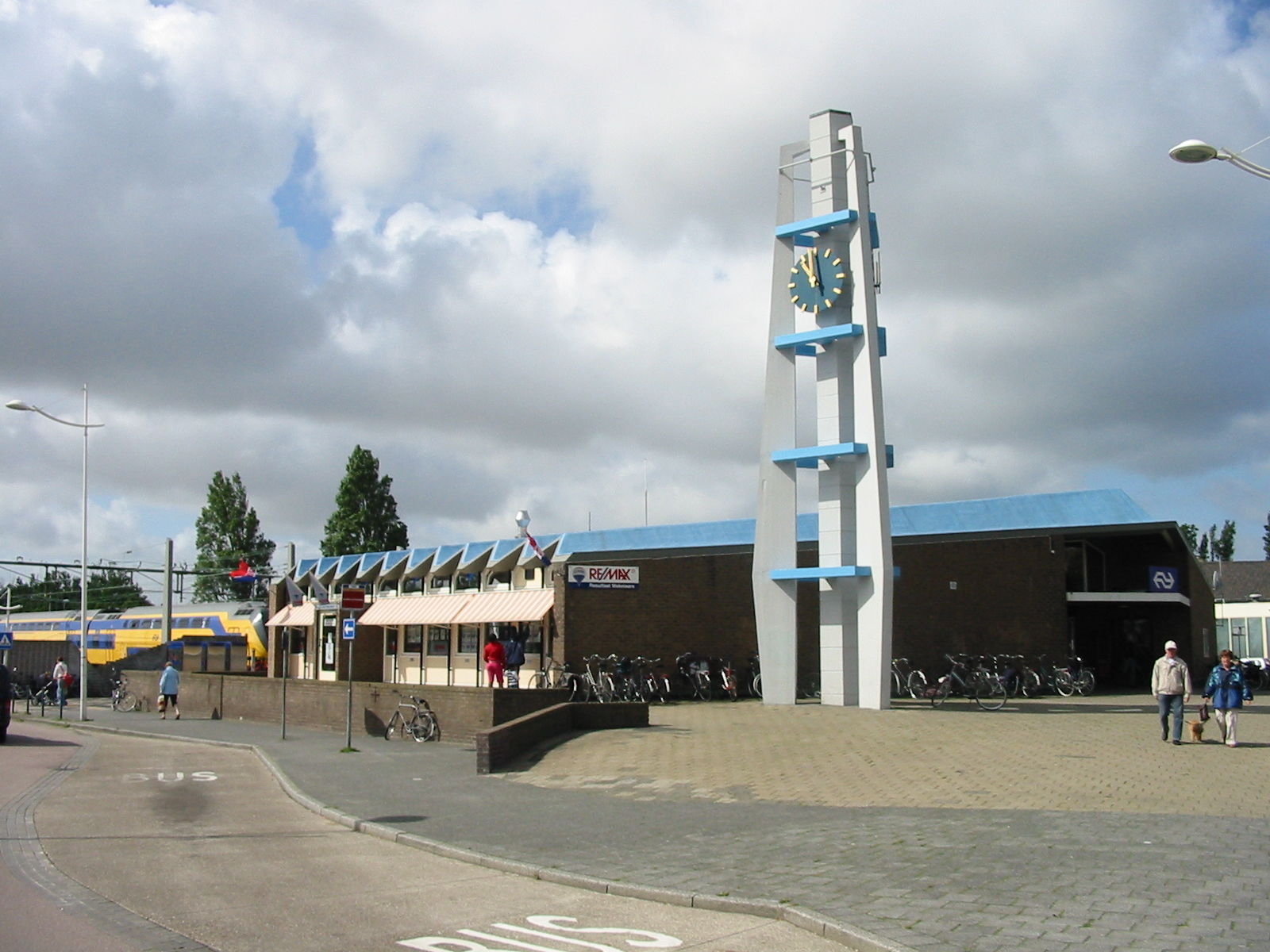

General information
- Location: Netherlands
- Coordinates: 52°57′23″N 4°45′39″E
- Line: Den Helder–Amsterdam railway

History
- Opened: 20 December 1865

Services
Preceding station	Nederlandse Spoorwegen	Following station
Terminus	NS Intercity 2700 Peak hours only	Den Helder Zuid towards Maastricht
Terminus	NS Intercity 3000	Den Helder Zuid towards Nijmegen
Location
- Location within Netherlands

Den Helder is a Terminus railway station in the naval town of Den Helder, The Netherlands. The station opened on 20 December 1865, and is the most northerly station in North Holland. The station is the start of the Den Helder–Amsterdam railway. The original station building was demolished in 1958 and a new building was built, a bit further south than the previous one.

The railway line was electrified in 1958. The station now has three platforms. The services are operated by Nederlandse Spoorwegen.

In 1980 another station in the town, Den Helder Zuid, opened.

== Train services ==
The station is served by the following service(s):

- 2× per hour Intercity services Den Helder – Amsterdam – Utrecht – Nijmegen
- Mon-Fri rush hour services Den Helder – Amsterdam – Utrecht – Maastricht, → morning, ← evening

== Bus services ==
The station is served by the following bus services:

Line	Route	Notes
Connexxion
28	Den Helder station - Den Burg - De Koog	Uses the ferry to Texel
30	Den Helder station - Nieuw-Den Helder - Den Helder Zuid station - Julianadorp	
31	Den Helder station - Nieuw-Den Helder - Den Helder Zuid station	
32	Den Helder station - Nieuw-Den Helder - Den Helder Zuid station - Julianadorp	
34	Den Helder station - De Schooten	
135	Den Helder station - Hippolytushoef - Den Oever bus station - Wieringerwerf - Middenmeer - Abbekerk - Hoorn	
158	Den Helder station - Anna Paulowna - Den Oever bus station	
851	Station Den Helder - Callantsoog - St Maartenszee - Petten	Summer bus along the coast
