= Voorburg railway station =

Railway station in the Netherlands

Voorburg
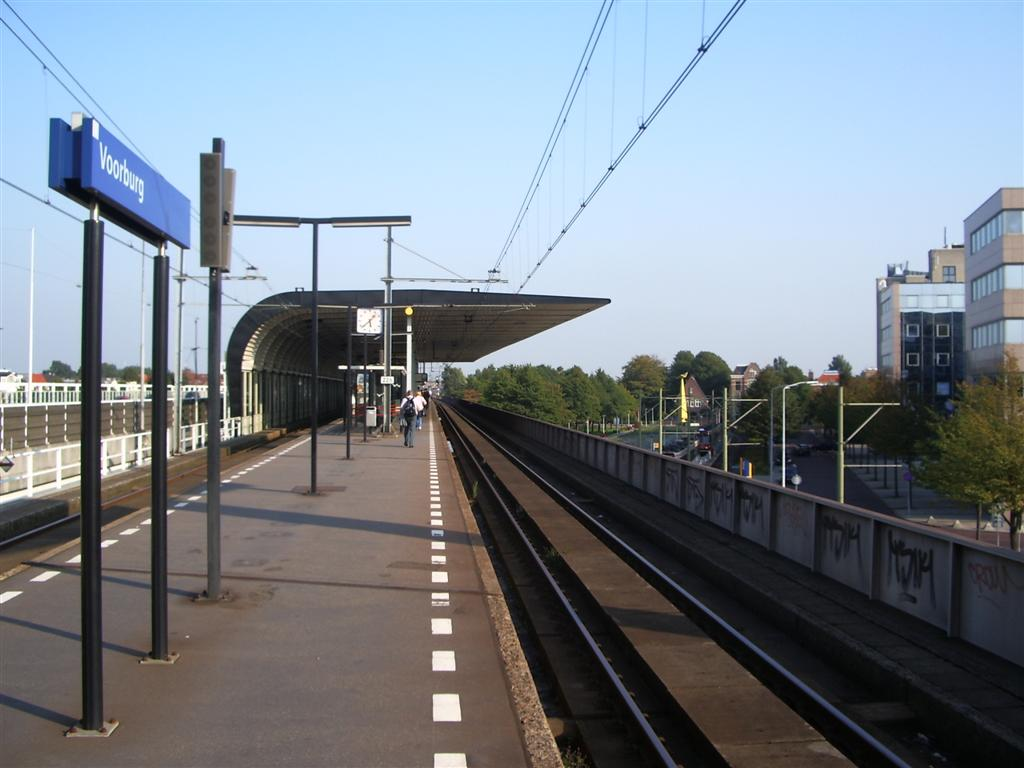

General information
- Location: Netherlands
- Coordinates: 52°4′5″N 4°21′44″E
- Line: Gouda–Den Haag railway

History
- Opened: 1870

Services
Preceding station	Nederlandse Spoorwegen	Following station
Den Haag Centraal Terminus	NS Sprinter 6000 After 18:00 and Fri-Sun	Den Haag Ypenburg towards 's-Hertogenbosch
Den Haag Centraal Terminus	NS Sprinter 6800	Den Haag Ypenburg towards Gouda Goverwelle
Den Haag Centraal Terminus	NS Sprinter 6900 Mon-Thur until 18:00	Den Haag Ypenburg towards Tiel
Location
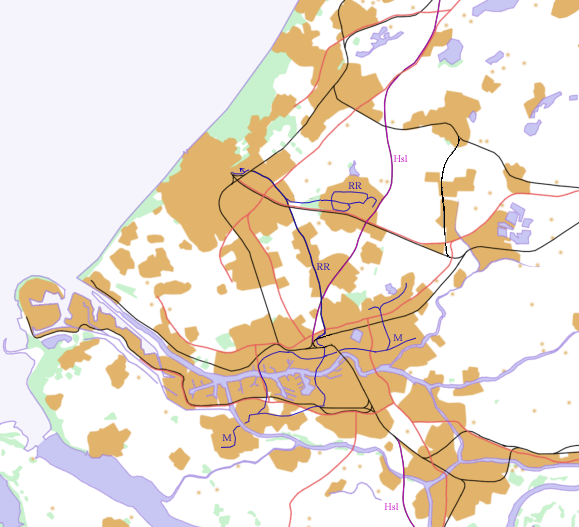
- Location within Southwest Randstad Location within Netherlands

Voorburg is a railway station located in Voorburg, Netherlands on the Gouda–Den Haag railway. The station was opened on 1 May 1870 and The train services are operated by Nederlandse Spoorwegen. The station also has a bus terminal, serving HTM routes 23, 26, and 28, as well as EBS routes 45 and 46.

== Location and history ==
Station Voorburg is situated in the most Southern part of the historic town center of Voorburg. It parallels motorway A12 which lies next to the railway at this point. Both motorway and railway-tracks/platform are elevated on long viaducts which spans different roads, streets and Canal de Vliet. In the Western direction starts the rail yard which end at station Den Haag Centraal.

=== Hofwijck ===
Next to the station lies Hofwijck mansion which at present houses a museum of the town history and of its former owners Christiaan and Constantijn Huygens. Before the railway, motorway and station were built the area was a part of the then much bigger Hofwijck estate.

=== Stationbuilding ===
The present elevated building was the last station designed by Koen van der Gaast. Its construction started by 1986. Before there was only a little building designed by A.W. van Erkel.

== Train services ==
The following services currently call at Voorburg:

- 2x per hour local service (sprinter) The Hague - Gouda - Utrecht
- 2x per hour local service (sprinter) The Hague - Gouda Goverwelle

== Bus services ==
These services departs from street level, on the north side of the station from the bus terminal.

HTM Services

- Bus 23 (Zwarte Pad - HMC Bronovo - Station Laan van NOI - Station Voorburg - Station Rijswijk - Colijnplein - Leyenburg)
- Bus 26 (Kijkduin - Leyenburg - Station Den Haag Moerwijk - Station Den Haag HS - Station Voorburg)
- Bus 28 (Norfolk - World Forum - Vredepaleis - Centrum - Den Haag Centraal - Station Voorburg)

EBS Services

- Bus 46 (Station Voorschoten - Leidschendam - Station Leidschendam-Voorburg - Station Voorburg - Den Haag Centraal)
- Bus 45 (Station Leiden Centraal - Station Leiden Lammenschans - Voorschoten - Leidschendam - Station Leidschendam-Voorburg - Station Voorburg - Den Haag Centraal)
