= Zoetermeer Oost railway station =

Railway station in the Netherlands

Zoetermeer Oost
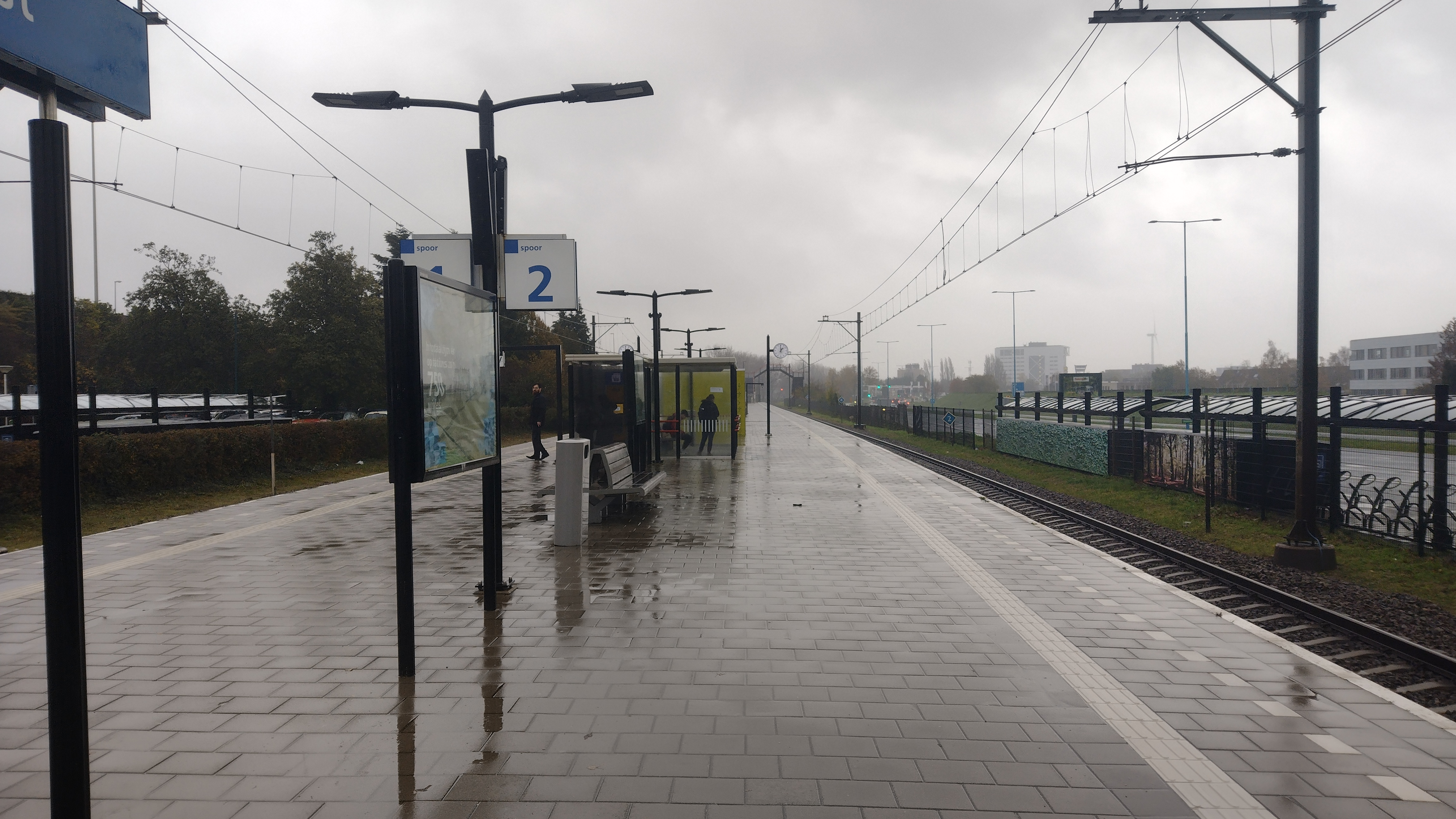

General information
- Location: Netherlands
- Coordinates: 52°2′47″N 4°29′34″E
- Line: Gouda–Den Haag railway

History
- Opened: 1870, reopened 1965
- Closed: 1938

Services
Preceding station	Nederlandse Spoorwegen	Following station
Zoetermeer towards Den Haag Centraal	NS Sprinter 6000 After 18:00 and Fri-Sun	Lansingerland-Zoetermeer towards 's-Hertogenbosch
Zoetermeer towards Den Haag Centraal	NS Sprinter 6800	Lansingerland-Zoetermeer towards Gouda Goverwelle
Zoetermeer towards Den Haag Centraal	NS Sprinter 6900 Mon-Thur until 18:00	Lansingerland-Zoetermeer towards Tiel
Location
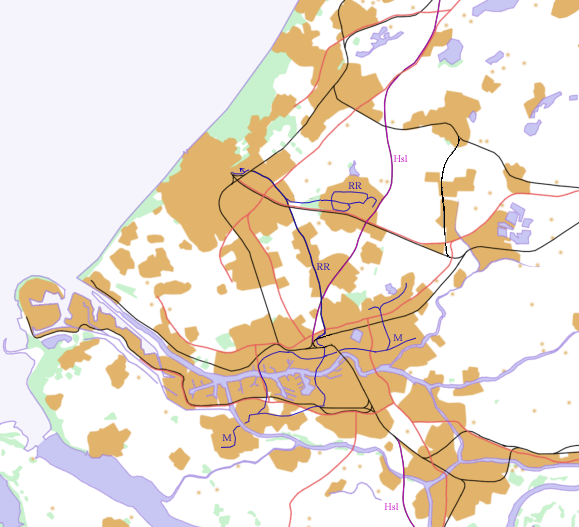
- Location within Southwest Randstad Location within Netherlands

Zoetermeer Oost is a railway station located in Zoetermeer, Netherlands. The station was opened in 1870, and is located on the Gouda–Den Haag railway. The train services are operated by Nederlandse Spoorwegen.

== Train services ==
The following services currently call at Zoetermeer Oost:

- 2x per hour local service (sprinter) The Hague - Gouda - Utrecht - Tiel / 's-Hertogenbosch
- 2x per hour local service during rushhour (sprinter) The Hague - Gouda Goverwelle
