= Den Haag Ypenburg railway station =

Railway station in The Hague, Netherlands

Den Haag Ypenburg
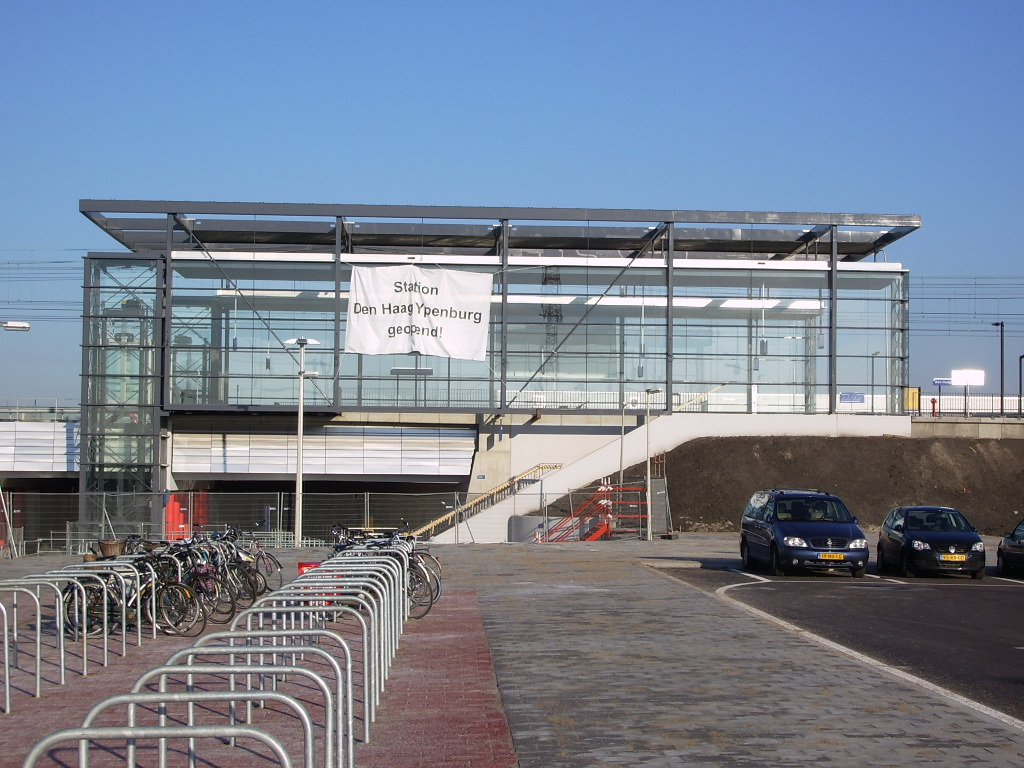

General information
- Location: Netherlands
- Coordinates: 52°03′33″N 4°23′23″E
- Operator: Nederlandse Spoorwegen
- Line: Gouda–Den Haag railway
- Platforms: 2

Other information
- Station code: Ypb

History
- Opened: 2005; 21 years ago

Services
Preceding station	Nederlandse Spoorwegen	Following station
Voorburg towards Den Haag Centraal	NS Sprinter 6000 After 18:00 and Fri-Sun	Zoetermeer towards 's-Hertogenbosch
Voorburg towards Den Haag Centraal	NS Sprinter 6800	Zoetermeer towards Gouda Goverwelle
Voorburg towards Den Haag Centraal	NS Sprinter 6900 Mon-Thur until 18:00	Zoetermeer towards Tiel
Location
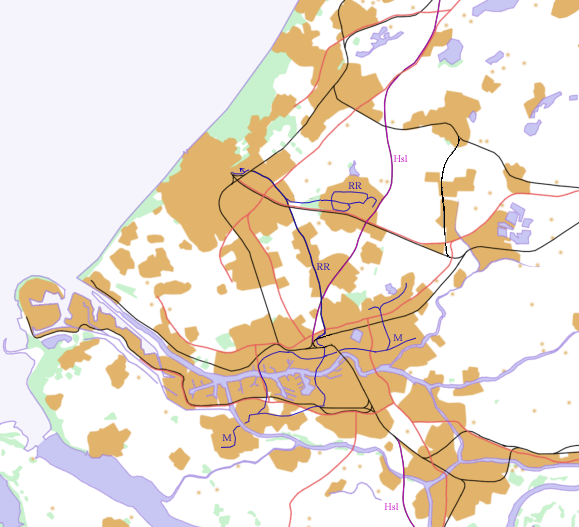
- Location within Southwest Randstad Location within Netherlands

Den Haag Ypenburg is a railway station in the Leidschenveen-Ypenburg district of The Hague, Netherlands. It opened on 11 December 2005. It is situated on the Gouda–Den Haag railway.

== Train services ==
The following train services currently call at Den Haag Ypenburg:

- 2x per hour local service (sprinter) The Hague - Gouda - Utrecht
- 2x per hour local service (sprinter) The Hague - Gouda Goverwelle

== Gallery ==
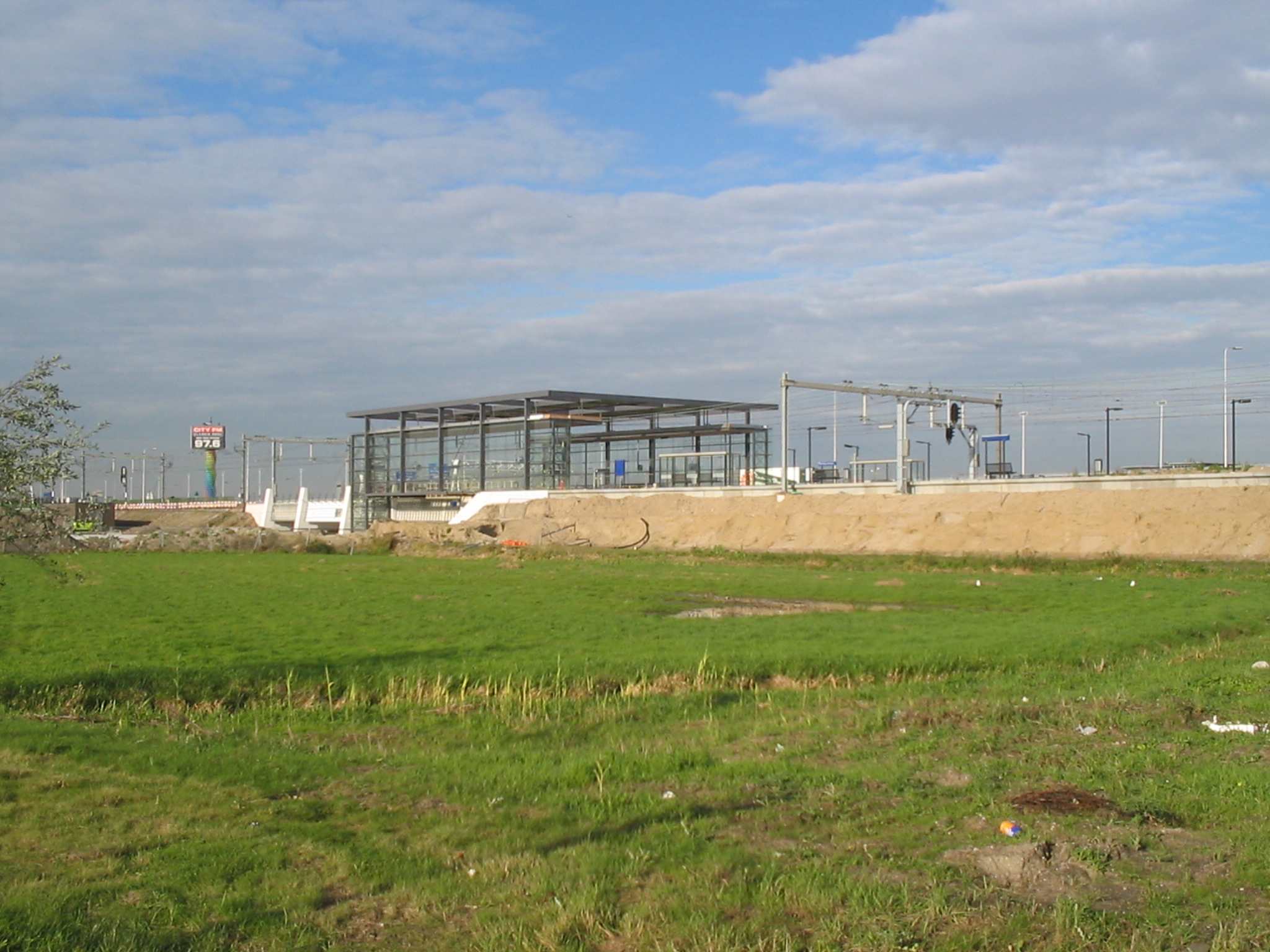
The railway station under construction (November 2005)

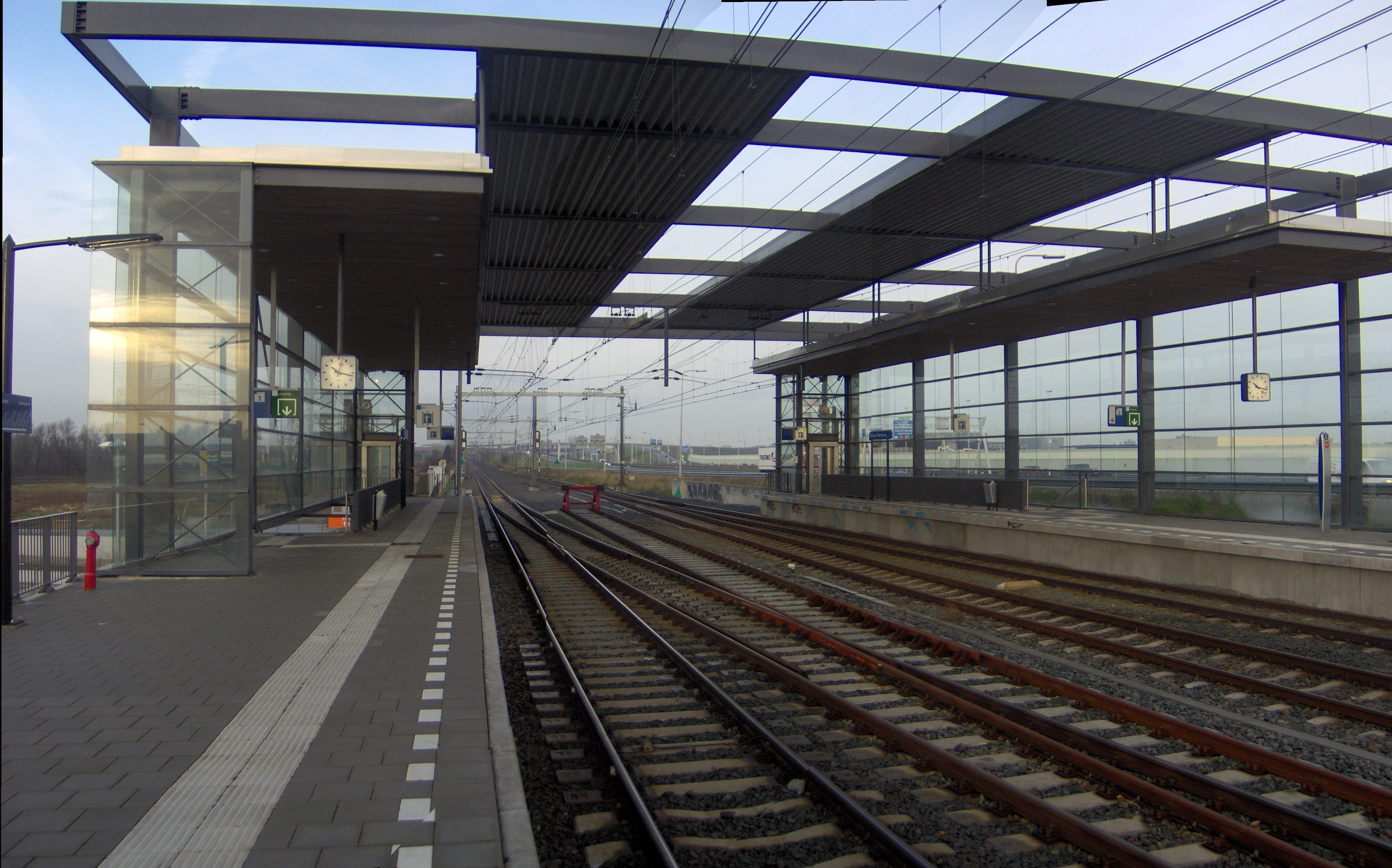
The railway station (January 2007)
