= Hofwijck =

Museum in Voorburg, the Netherlands

Hofwijck from the Southeast. Behind the main building, the elevated train station and highway A12 cross over the Vliet.

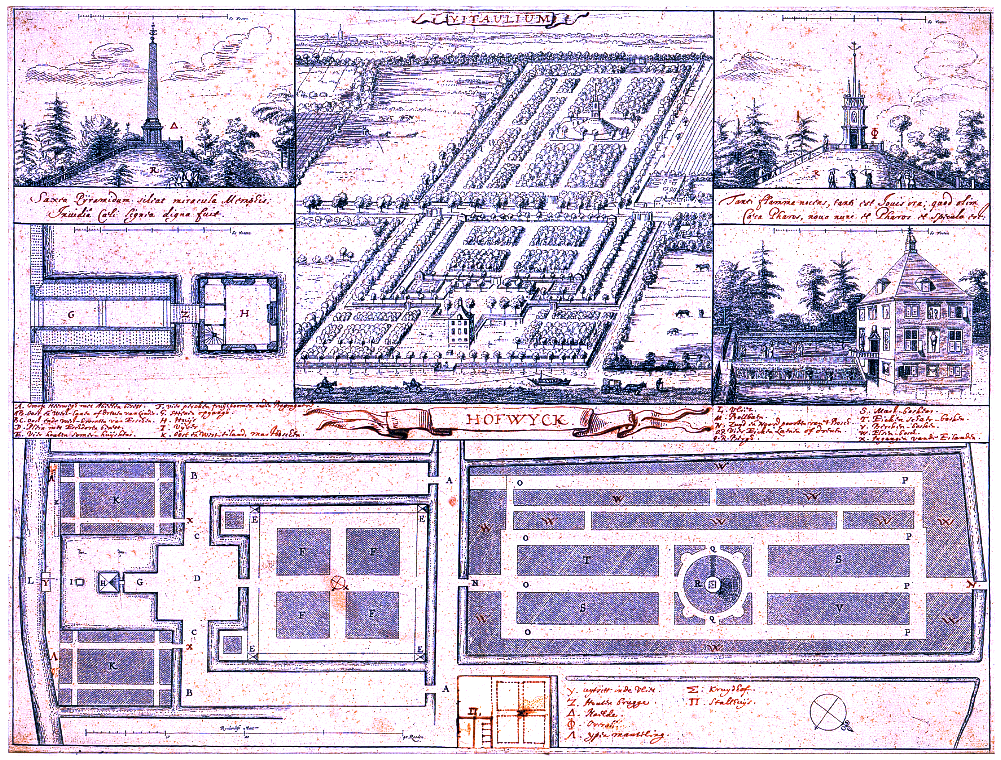
Drawing of the garden plans of Hofwijck, 1653

Hofwijck (Dutch pronunciation: [ˈɦɔfʋɛik]; or Vitaulium in Latin) is a mansion built for 17th-century politician Constantijn Huygens. It is located in Voorburg on the Vliet canal from The Hague to Leiden. The formal address of the cultural heritage is 2 Westeinde, Voorburg, the Netherlands, but its location today is better known as the Voorburg railway station.

== Construction ==
After he became a widower, Huygens bought land on the Vliet in Voorburg with plans to build a summer home. At the time it was quite fashionable to have a summer home on a river or canal, and old maps of Voorburg show Hofwijck as one of many. The building itself and the gardens (originally on both sides of the Vliet) were designed by Huygens himself in cooperation with the architect Jacob van Campen. The estate was to be "a harmonious piece of paradise on earth, with a garden in God’s image and likeness." Huygens was very much inspired by the works of classical Roman architect Vitruvius. Pieter Post was in charge of the actual building activities.

The building was erected in unplastered brick and is in the Classicist style. It stands in the centre of a square swan pond. Hofwijck was inaugurated in 1642 in the company of friends and relatives.

== Replica in China ==
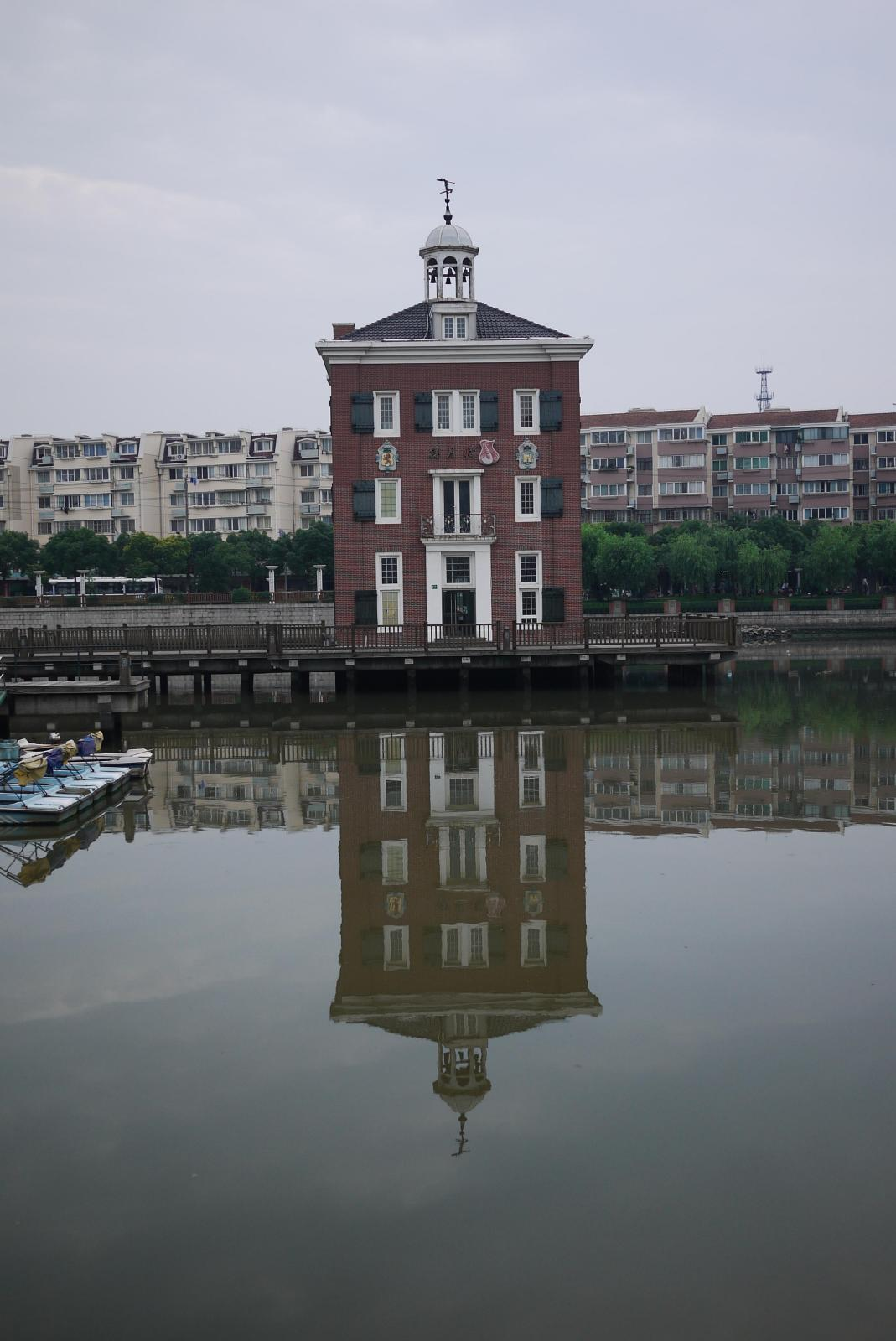
The replica of Howijck in Gaoqiao

A replica of Hofwijck was built in Gaoqiao (Chinese 高桥) a planned city and neighborhood of the large community Pudong, Shanghai, People's Republic of China at 31.34107°N 121.5724°E, next to another replica of the Nederlands Scheepvaartmuseum.

== Collection ==
In the collection on display are various items from the Dutch Royal family that have to do with the work of either Constantijn or his son Christiaan. In the display room for Christiaan, various types of clockworks are shown, as well as some original clocks. Family paintings and furniture are on display throughout the building, and the library of Huygens (now a small office) contains many of his books, and offers the same strategic view out of the window at any boat that may appear (today one only sees highway traffic at eye level, and barge traffic at water level).

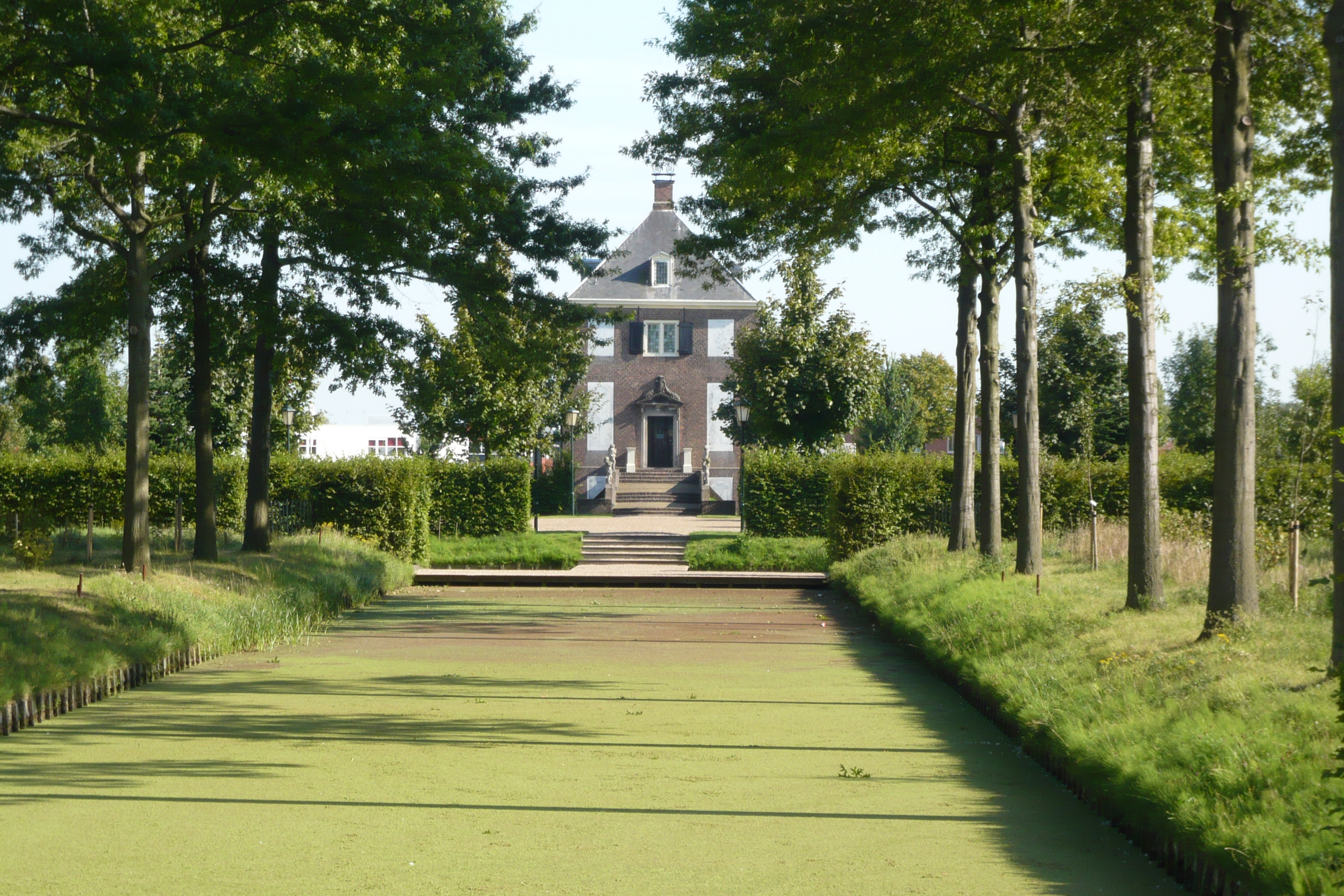
Hofwijck from the station.

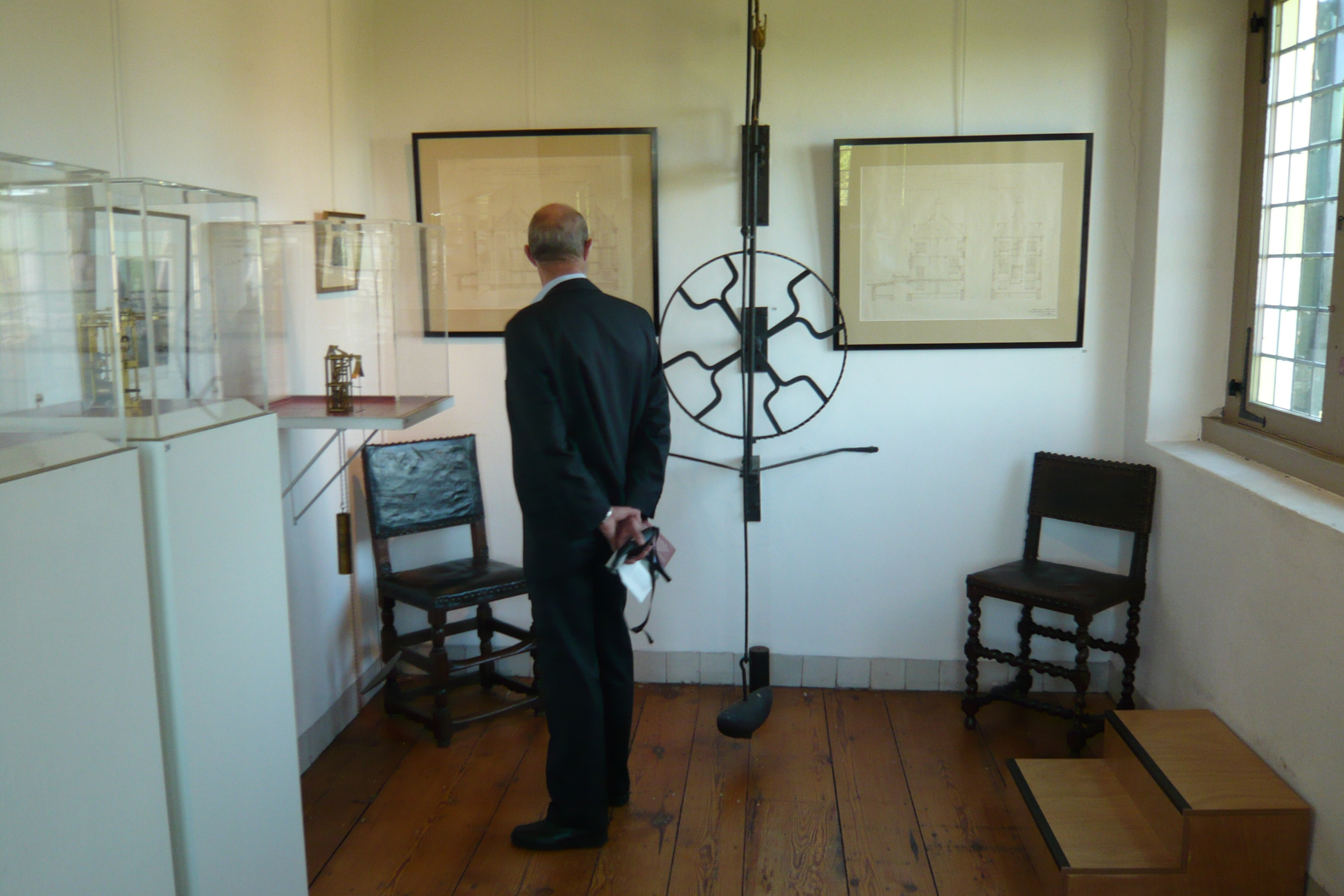
Christiaan Huygens room, with pendulum from the church in Scheveningen.

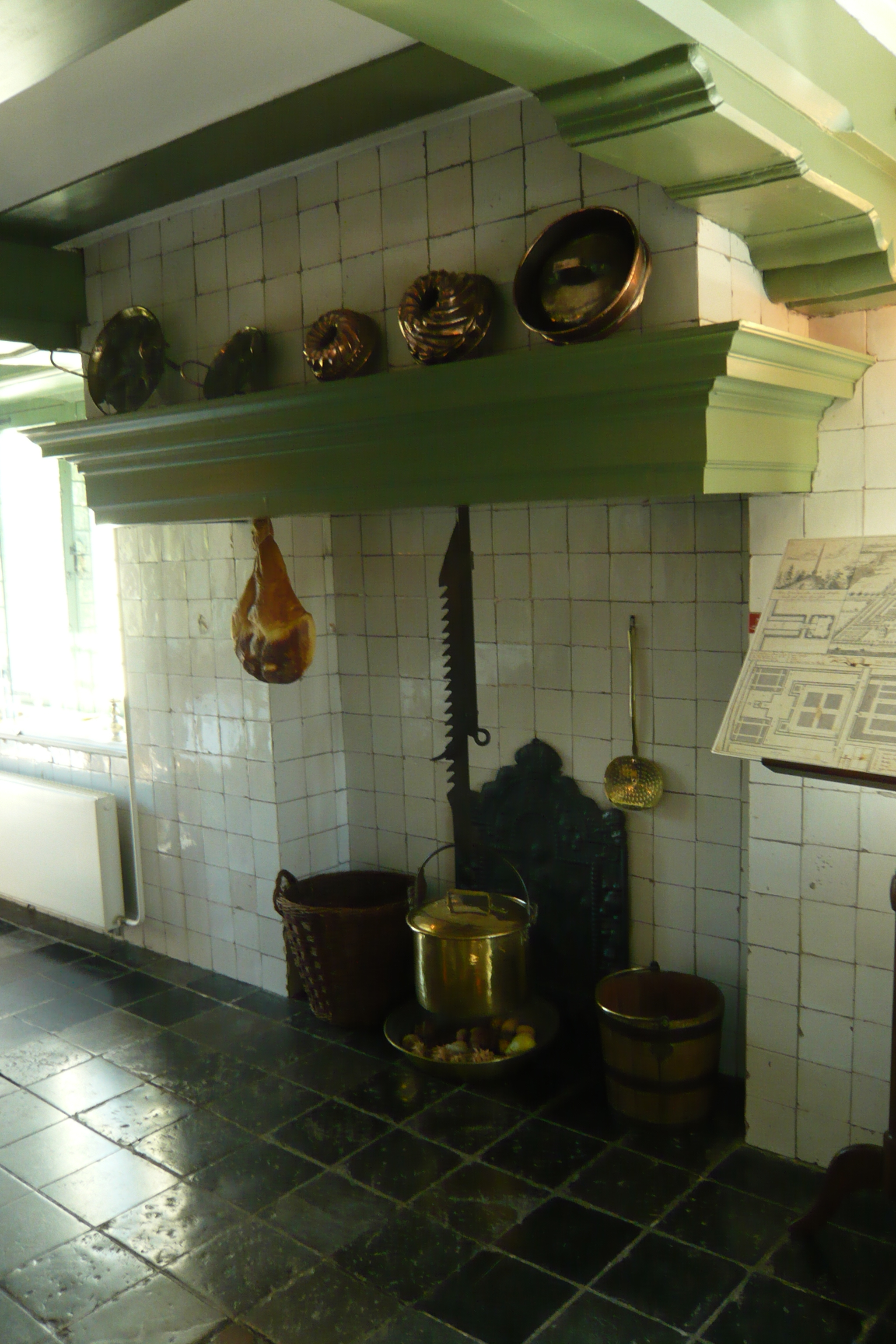
Hofwijck kitchen hearth.

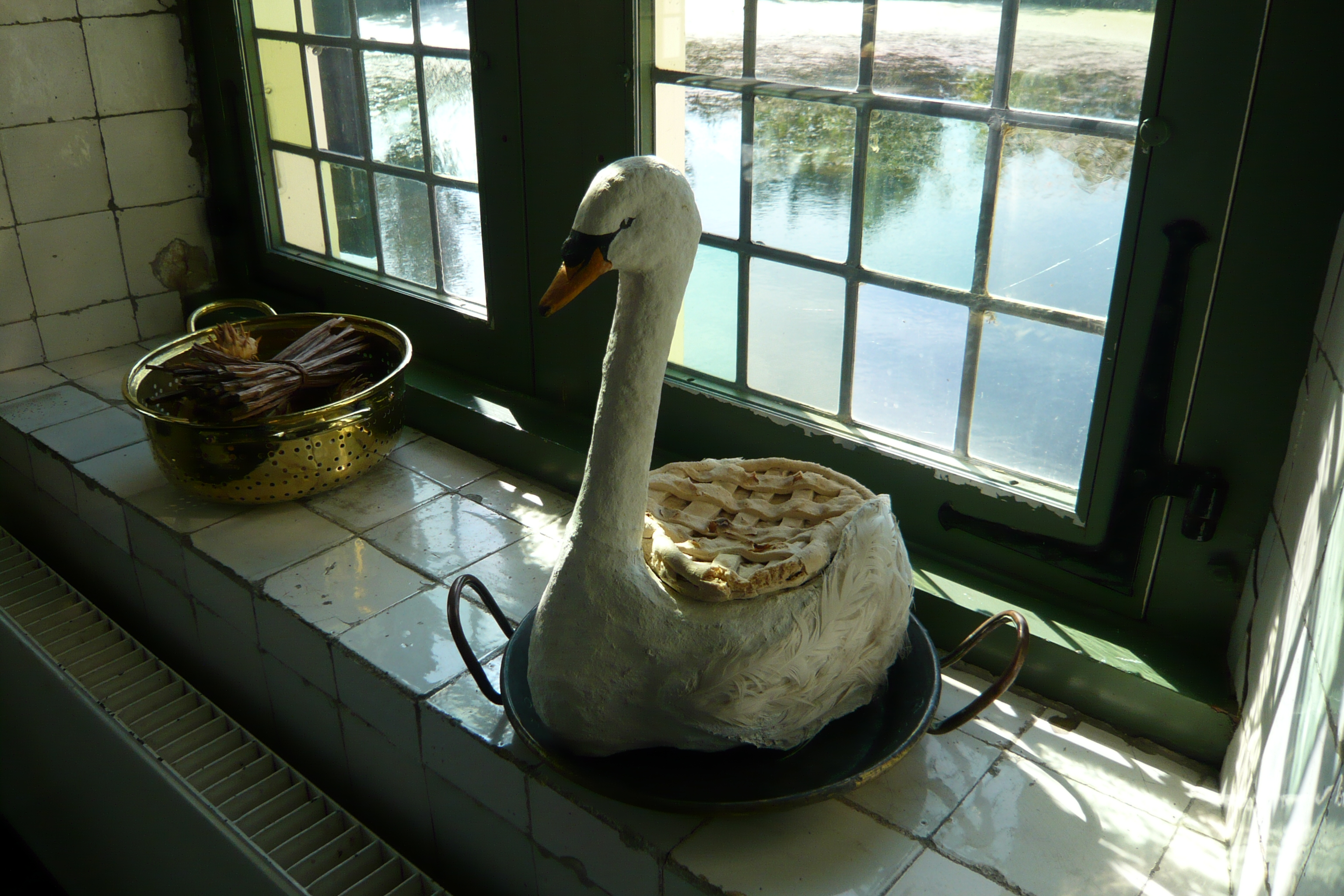
Swan pie - Huygens kept swans by Royal permission.

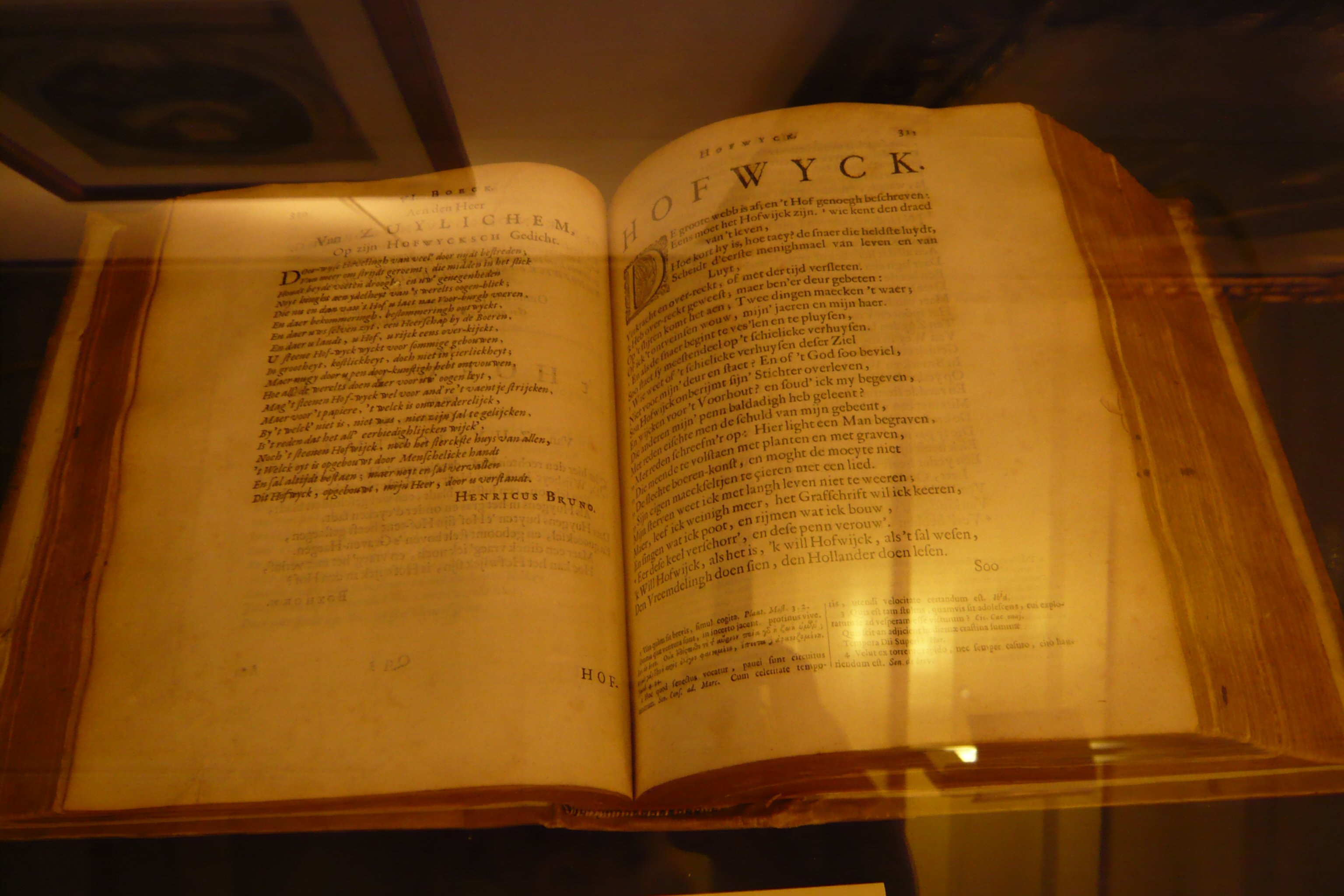
Poem about Hofwijck on display.

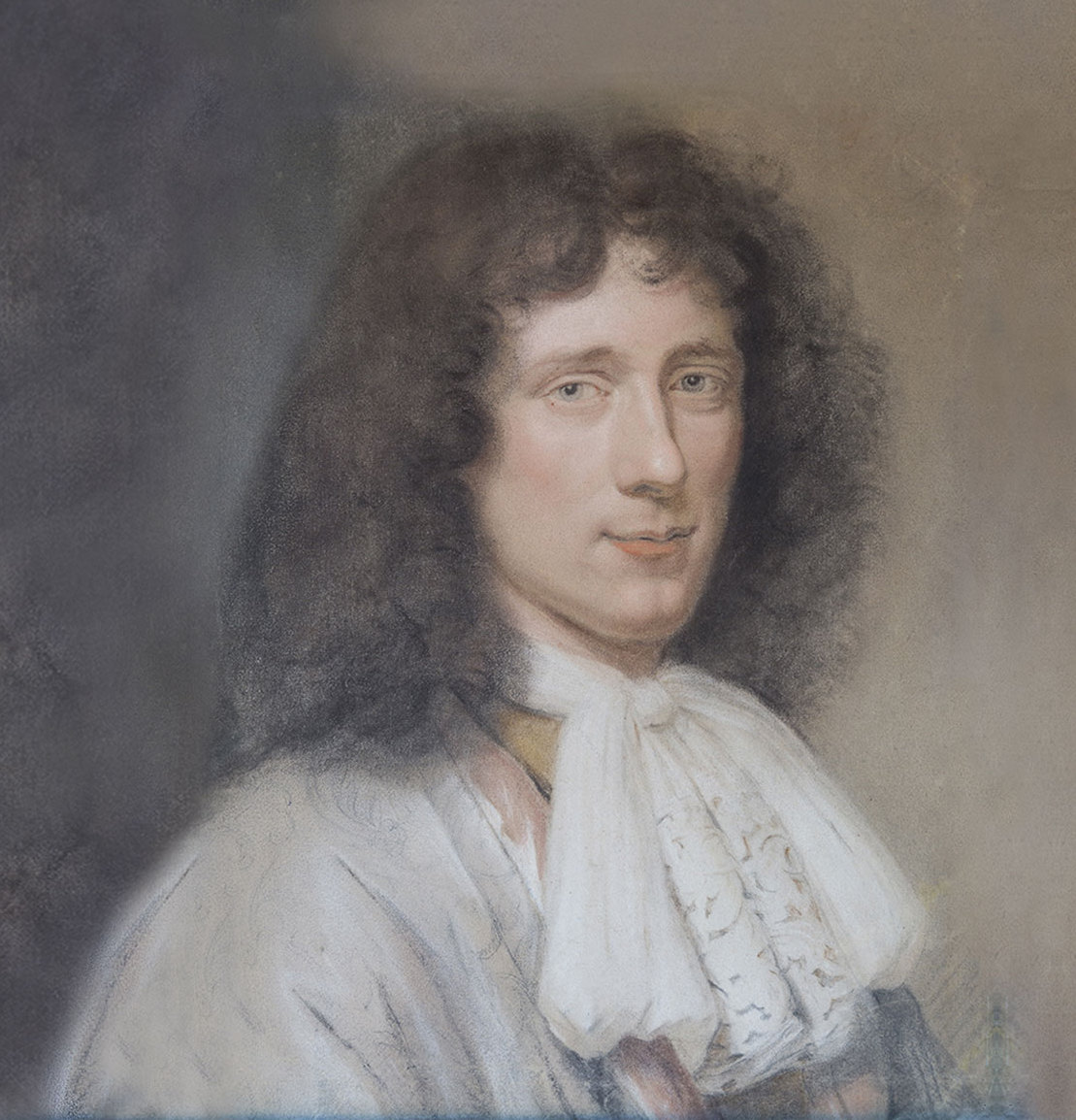
Pastel portrait of Christiaan in 1686 by Bernard Vaillant, which hangs above a pendant portrait of his sister Susanna.

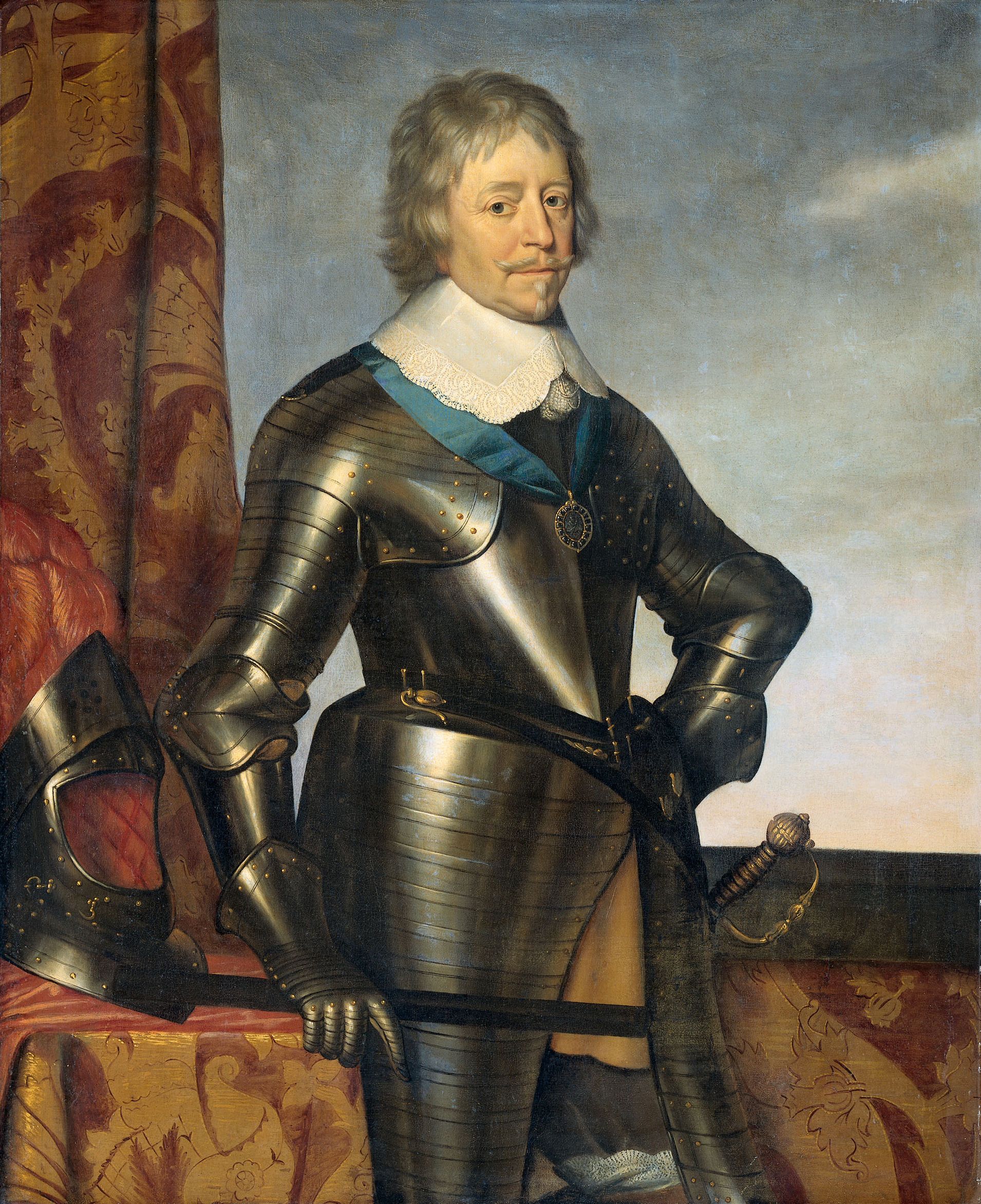
Frederick Henry, Prince of Orange, by Gerard van Honthorst, 1650.

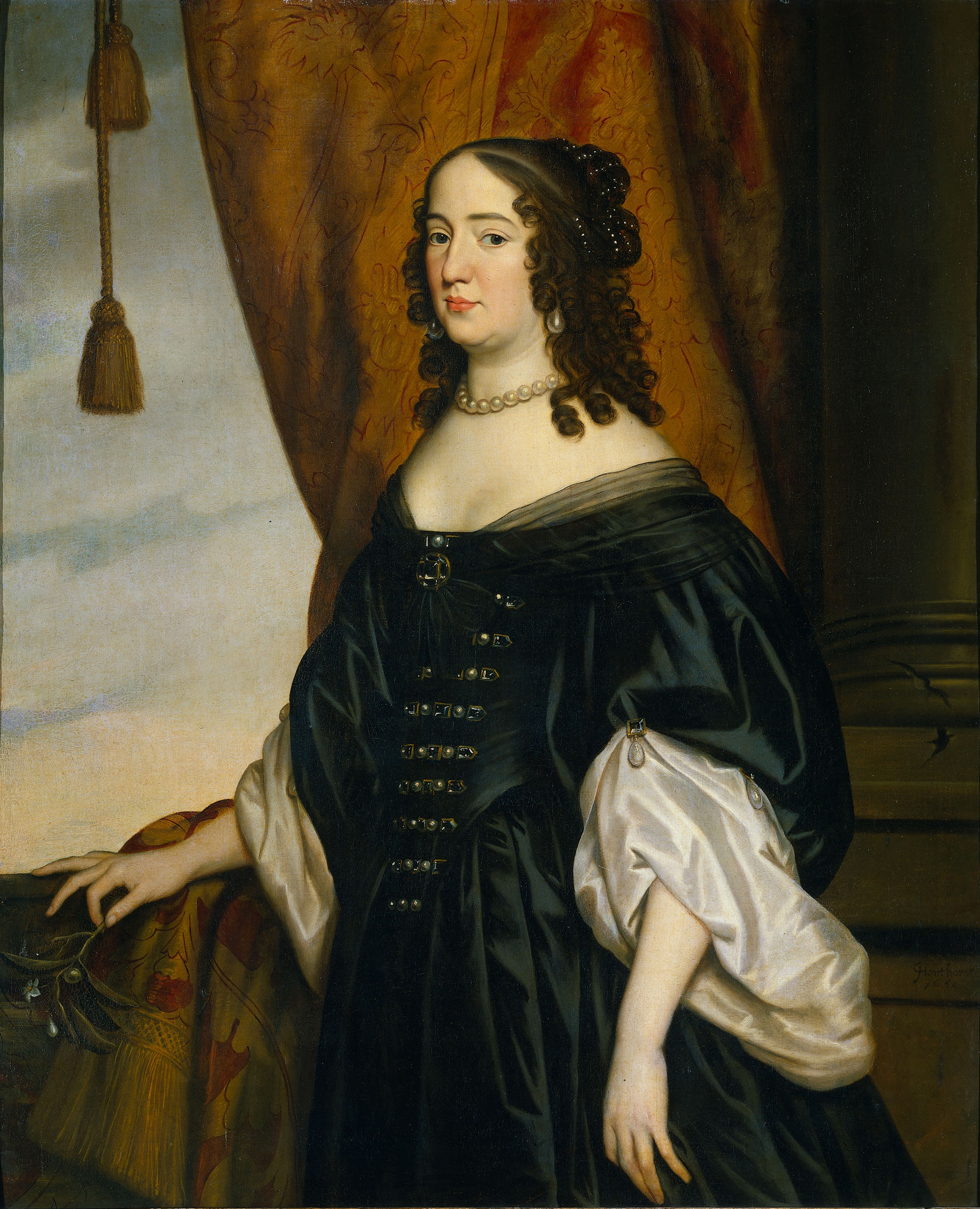
Pendant portrait Amalia van Solms-Braunfels

== After Constantijn's death ==
When Constantijn died, his son, the scientist Christiaan Huygens, came to live there. In 1750 the last Huygens to live there sold it. Grossly neglected in later years, it was auctioned for demolition in 1849, which was avoided when it was acquired by politician Guillaume Groen van Prinsterer.

The "Hofwijck Association" acquired it circa 1913, when demolition loomed again. It is now a museum, which opened its door for the first time on June 12, 1928. It closed its doors in 1995 for restoration of the gardens and building and reopened since May 31, 2005 in presence of Beatrix of the Netherlands. On November 4, 2002, Hofwijck became a registered Monument as number 508184.

== Trivia ==
- Huygens had Hofwijck built so he would have a place to escape the tensions that life as a politician brought with it, and its name reflects this: "hof" means "(royal) court" and "wijck" means "escape". However, it has more than one meaning, because "hof" can also mean "garden" and "wijck" can also mean "place". The Latin name has a double meaning too: Vitaulium means "garden of life" as well as "garden of Vitruvius".
- From 1950 to 1970 this house was on the Dutch 25 guilder note.
- Until 2006, the Dutch intercity trains stopped in Voorburg. This was the condition requested of the Dutch railway board by the city of Voorburg, when they gave a large piece of the garden to the building of the rails in the 19th century.
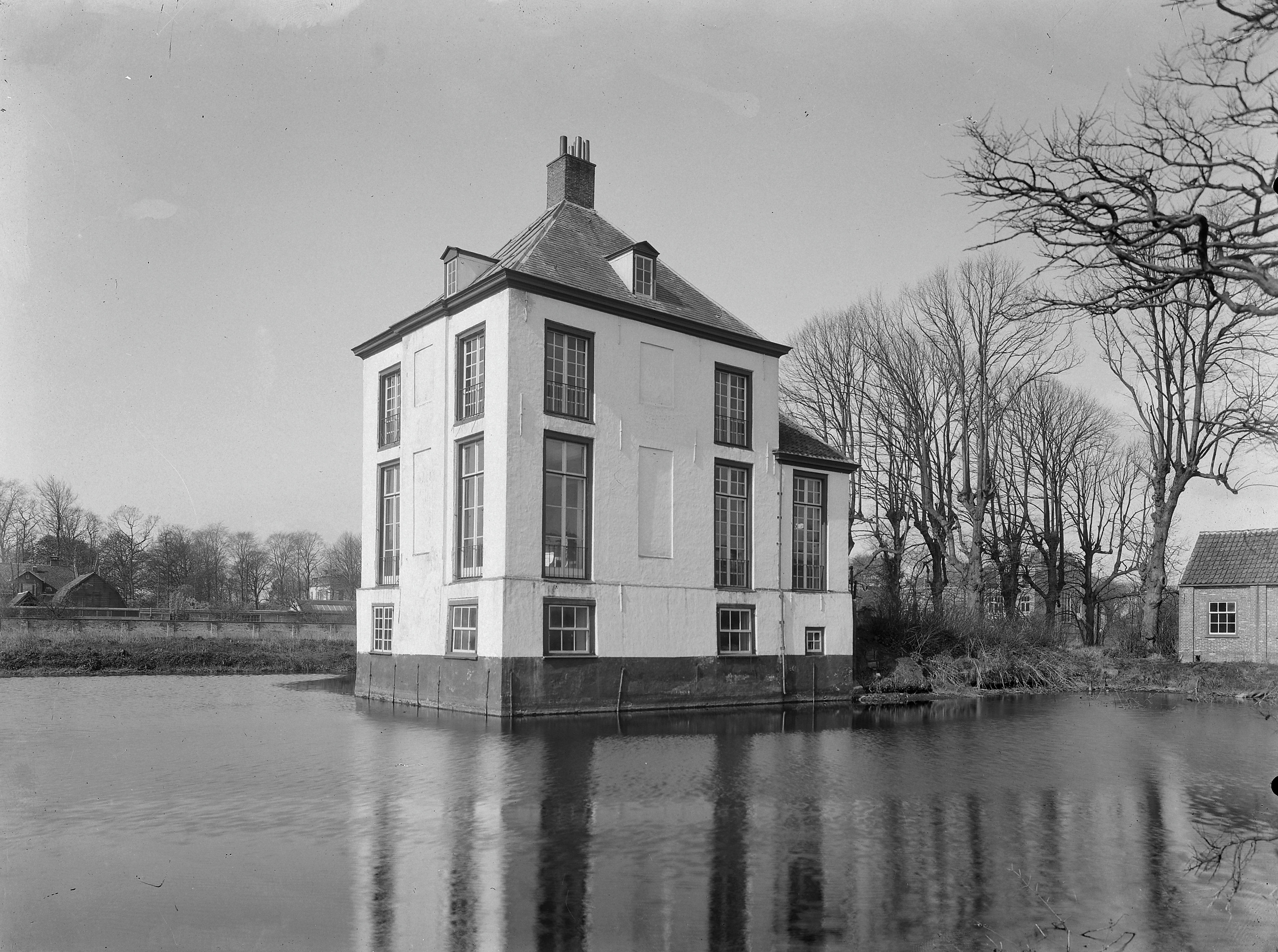
Hofwijck in 1914, temporary extended

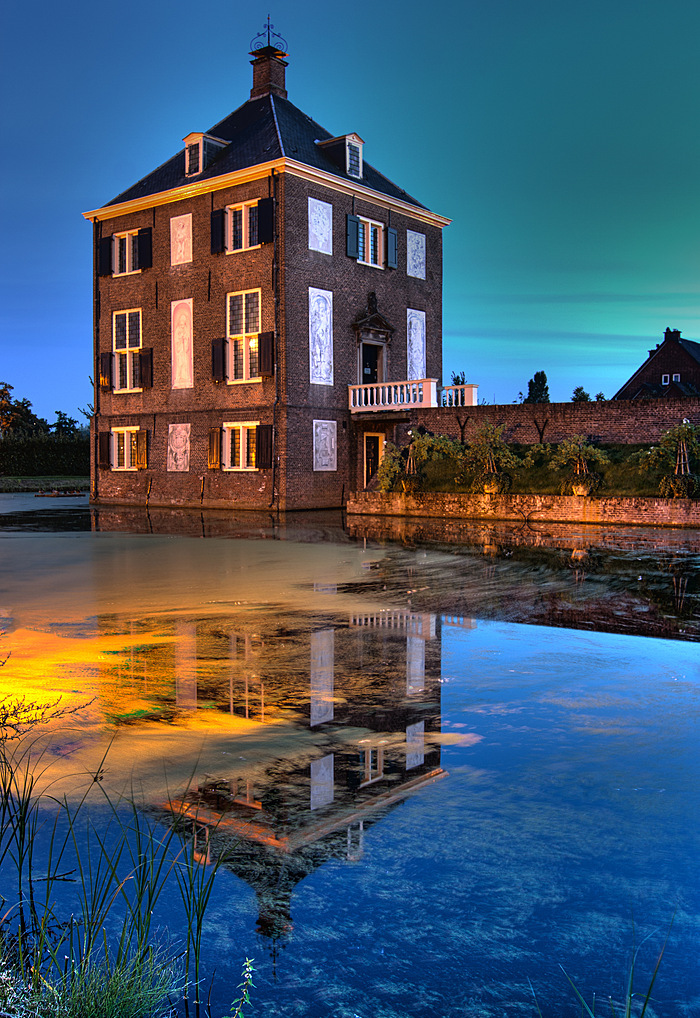
Most Visitors came by Trekschuits. The suppliers door is under the bridge.

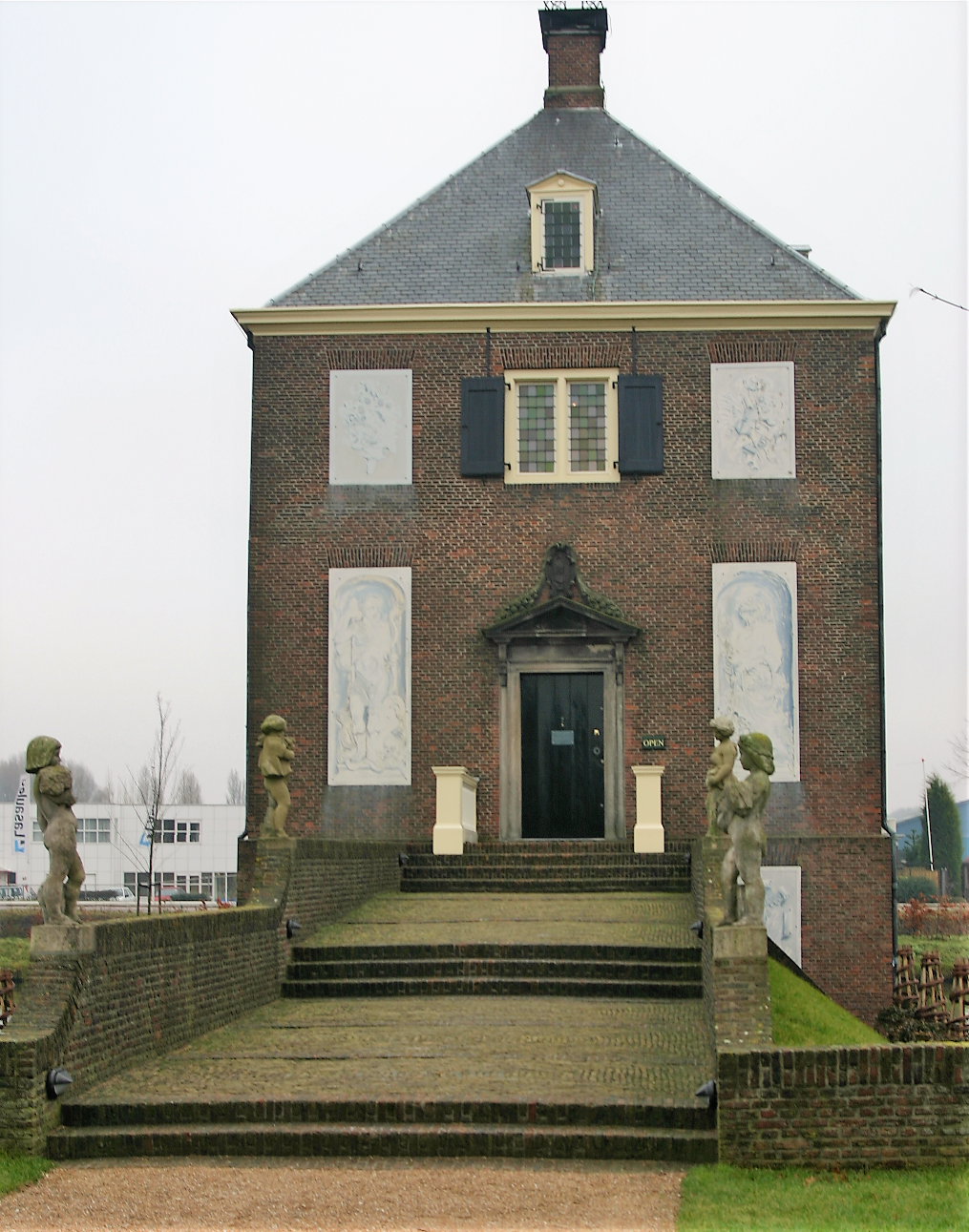
Most visitors originally arrived by trekschuit, so this is the rear view of the house, and the door for deliveries was under the little bridge.

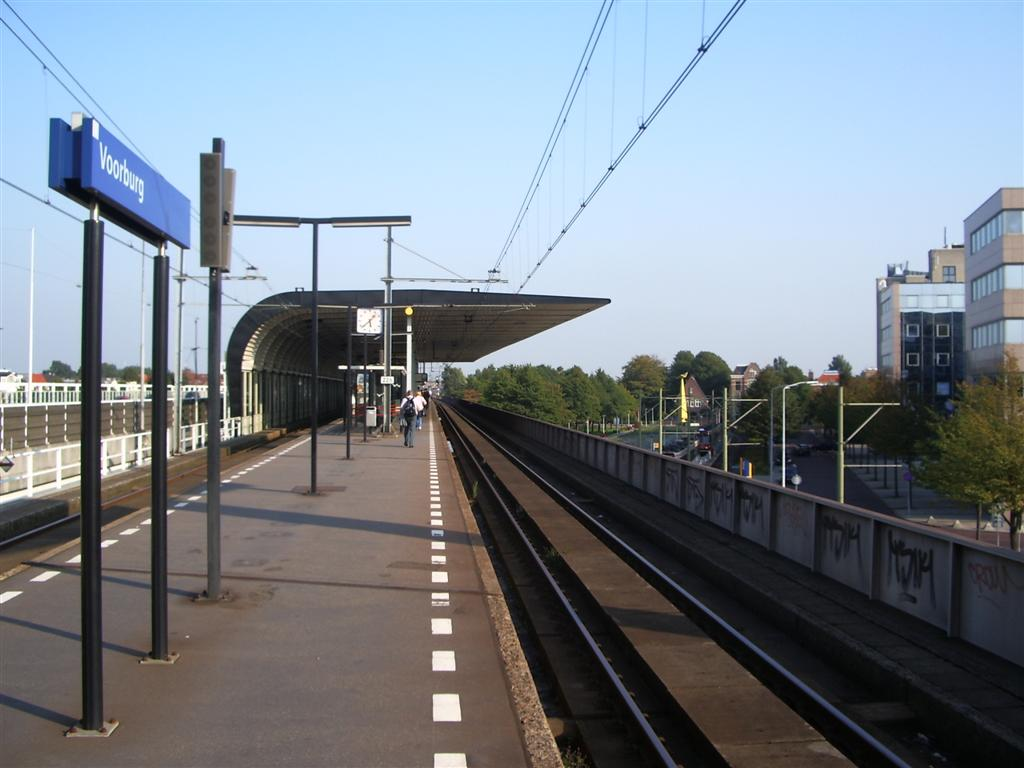
Voorburg railway station. On the right is the Hofwijck gatehouse.

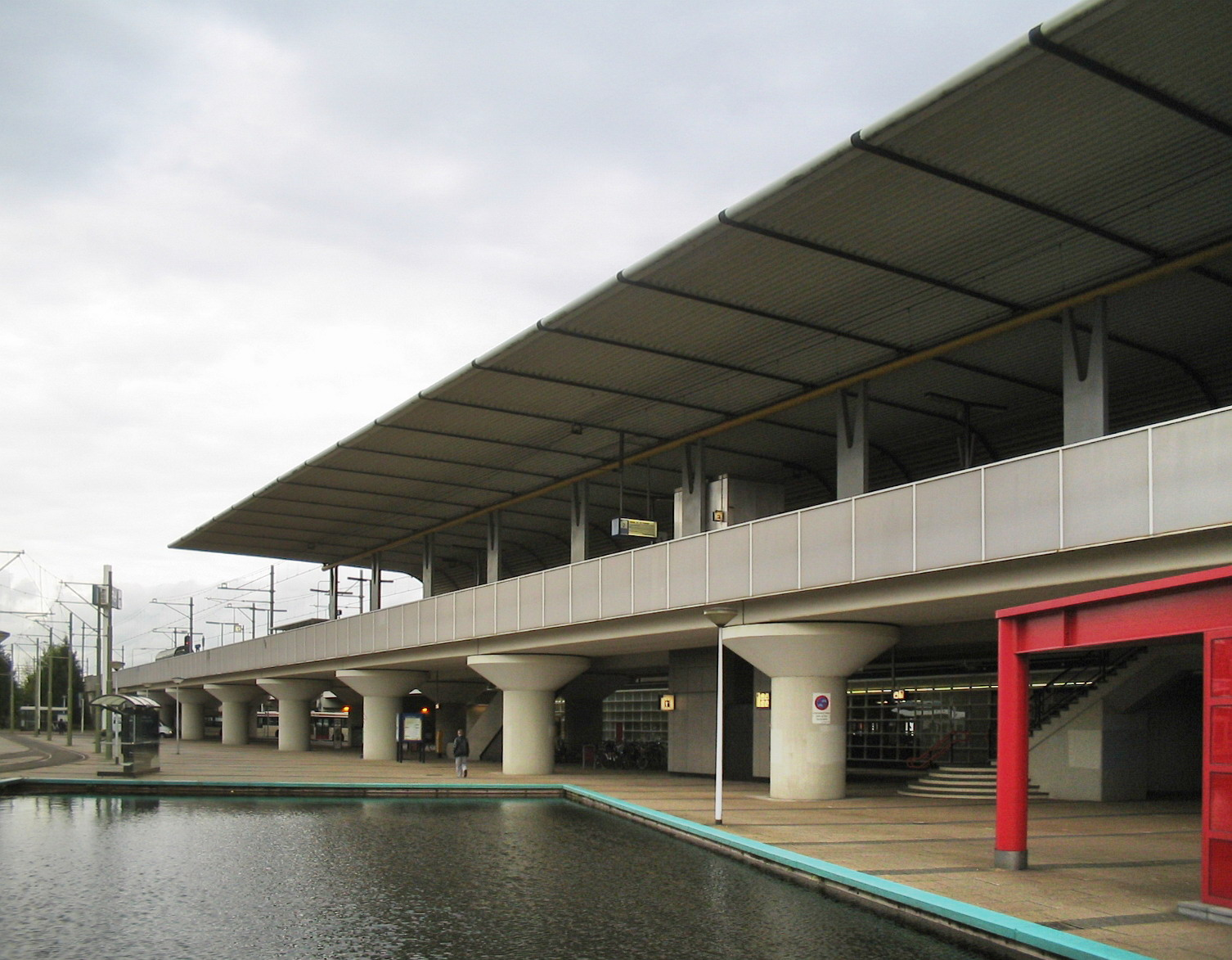
Voorburg station from the ground, the pond is part of the original garden.

=== Poem about Hofwijck ===
De groote webb is af; en ’t Hof genoegh beschreven:
Eens moet het Hofwijck zijn. wie kent den draed van ’t leven,
Hoe kort hij is, hoe taeij? de snaer die heldste luijdt
Scheidt d’eerste menighmael van leven en van Luijt,
Verkracht en over-reckt, of met der tijd versleten.
[...]
'k Wil Hofwijck, als het is, 'k wil Hofwijck,
als 't zal wezen, de vreemdeling doen zien,
de Hollander doen lezen.

== See also ==
- Dutch Golden Age
