= Zoetermeer railway station =

Railway station in the Netherlands

Zoetermeer
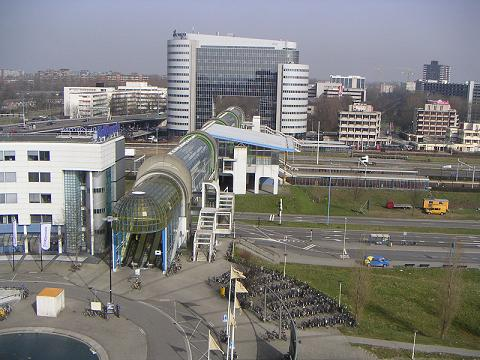

General information
- Location: Netherlands
- Coordinates: 52°2′51″N 4°28′39″E
- Line: Gouda–Den Haag railway

History
- Opened: 1973

Services
Preceding station	Nederlandse Spoorwegen	Following station
Den Haag Ypenburg towards Den Haag Centraal	NS Sprinter 6000 After 18:00 and Fri-Sun	Zoetermeer Oost towards 's-Hertogenbosch
Den Haag Ypenburg towards Den Haag Centraal	NS Sprinter 6800	Zoetermeer Oost towards Gouda Goverwelle
Den Haag Ypenburg towards Den Haag Centraal	NS Sprinter 6900 Mon-Thur until 18:00	Zoetermeer Oost towards Tiel
Location
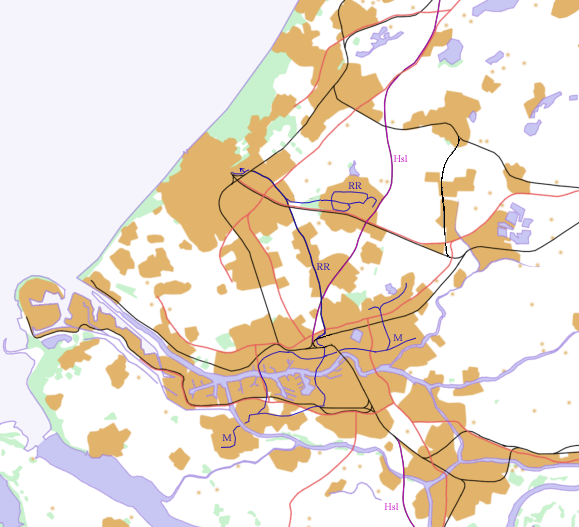
- Location within Southwest Randstad Location within Netherlands

Zoetermeer is a railway station located in Zoetermeer, Netherlands. The station was opened in 1973, and is located on the Gouda–Den Haag railway. The train services are operated by Nederlandse Spoorwegen.

== Train services ==
The following services currently call at Zoetermeer:

- 2x per hour local service (sprinter) The Hague - Gouda - Utrecht - Tiel / 's-Hertogenbosch
- 2x per hour local service during rushhour Monday to Thursday (sprinter) The Hague - Gouda Goverwelle
