= Gouda–Den Haag railway =

Railway line in the Netherlands

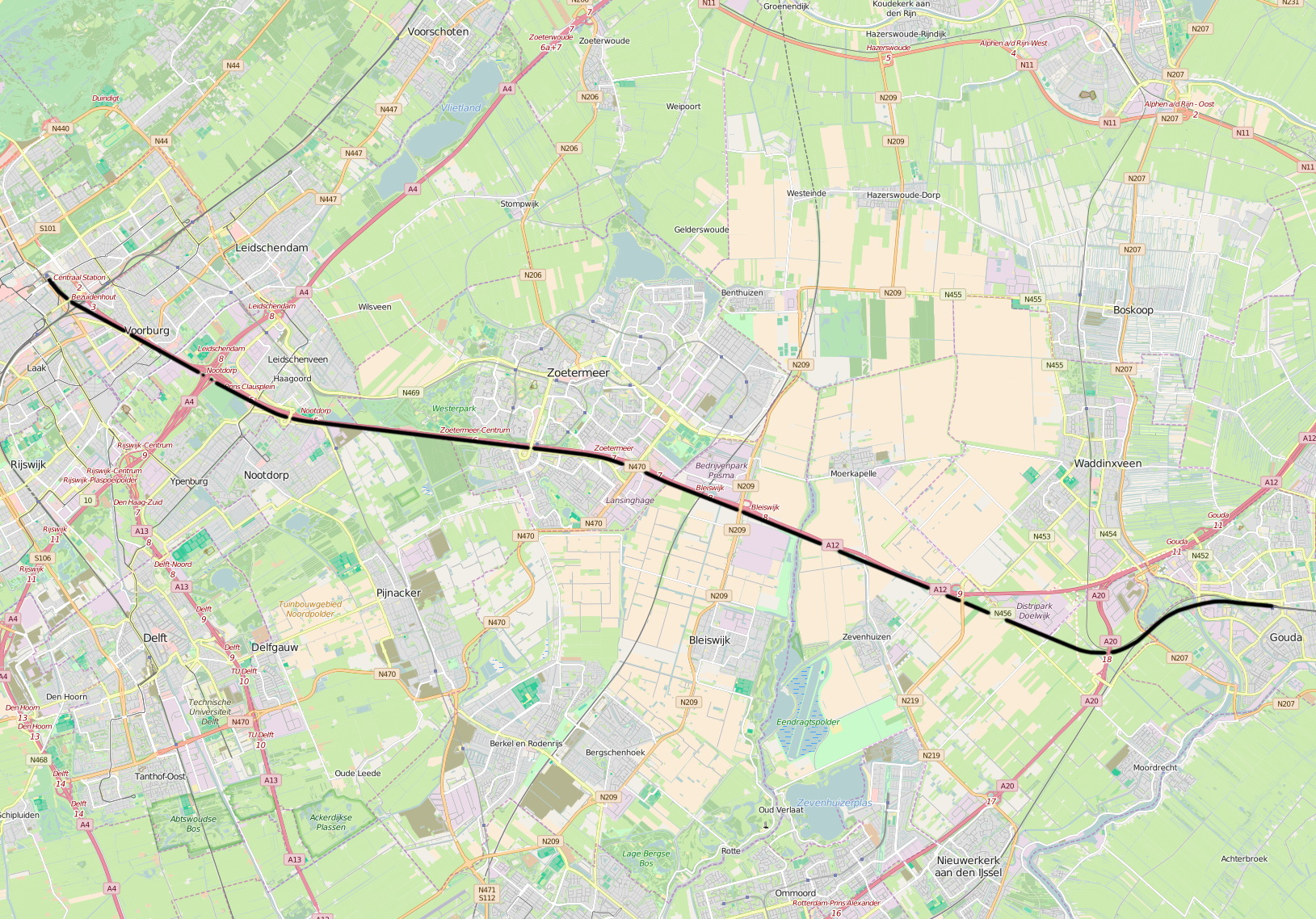

Overview
- Status: Operational
- Locale: Netherlands
- Termini: Gouda railway station; Den Haag Centraal railway station

Service
- Operator(s): Nederlandse Spoorwegen

History
- Opened: 1870

Technical
- Line length: 25 km (16 mi)
- Number of tracks: double track
- Track gauge: 1,435 mm (4 ft 8 1/2 in) standard gauge
- Electrification: 1.5 kV DC

The Gouda–Den Haag railway is a heavily used railway line in the Netherlands, running from Gouda railway station to Den Haag Centraal railway station, passing through Zoetermeer railway station. It was opened on May 1, 1870.

== Stations ==
The main interchange stations on the Gouda–Den Haag railway are:

- Gouda: to Rotterdam and Leiden
- Zoetermeer: to RandstadRail light rail network
- Den Haag Centraal: to Rotterdam, Leiden and Amsterdam
