= Zaans =

Zaans is a dialect of Dutch spoken in the Zaan district, which lies north of Amsterdam, in the Dutch province of North Holland. Zaans is one of the oldest dialects in the country. The dialect has similarities to the West Frisian dialect which is spoken in an area further north of the Zaan district.

Zaans is spoken in the city of Zaandam and in the towns of Oostzaan, Westzaan, Krommenie, Assendelft, Zaandijk, Koog aan de Zaan, Jisp, Wormerveer, Wormer, and Oost- and West-Knollendam.

In the late 19th century, Gerrit Jacob Boekenoogen published a 1368-page dictionary of Zaans, De Zaansche volkstaal. Bijdrage tot de kennis van den woordenschat in Noord-Holland (Leiden, 1897).

A Zaans phrase now used throughout the Netherlands is doeg or doei, a colloquial term for "goodbye".
