= Jisp, North Holland =

Jisp
- Village
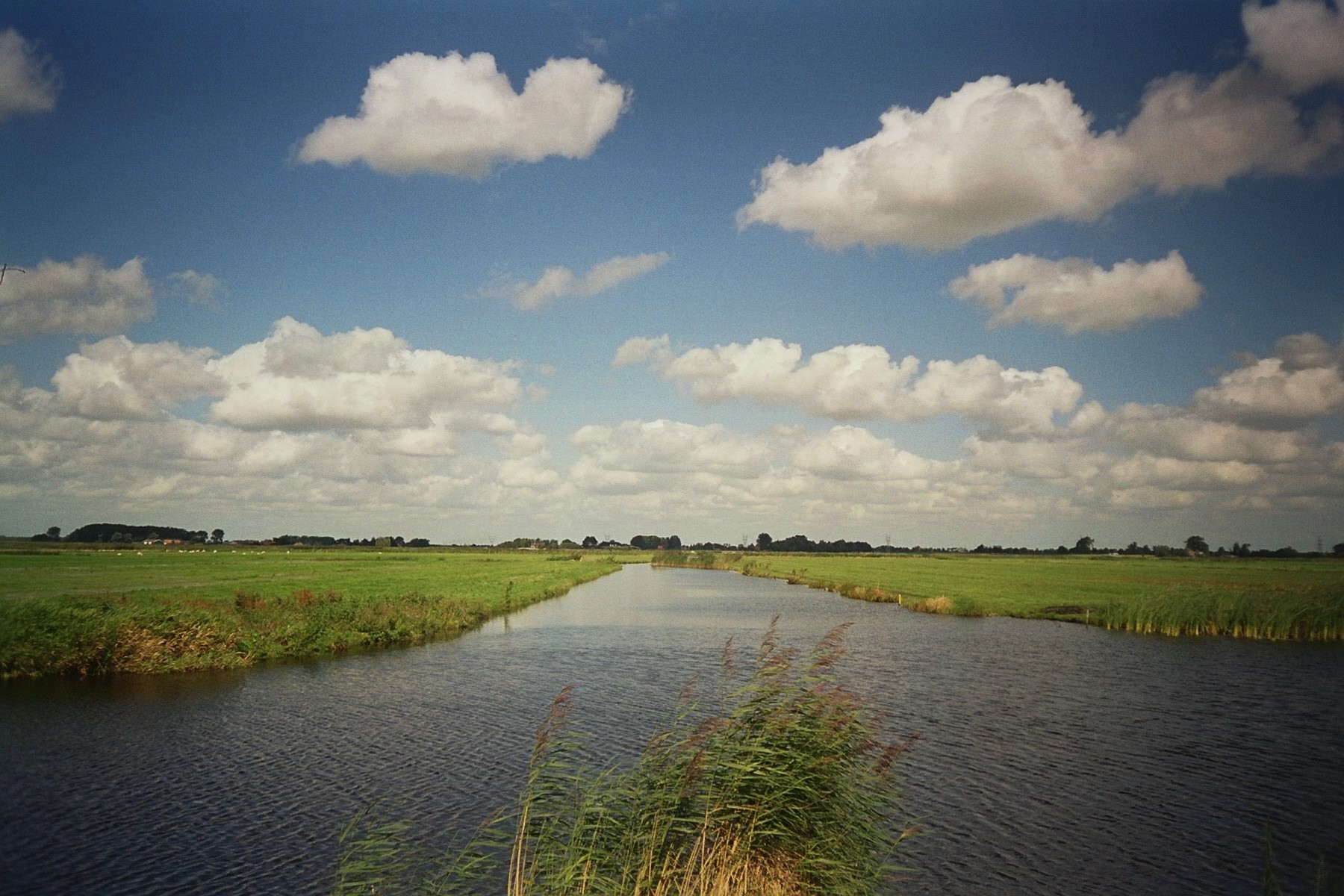
- Meadows and water in the area known as the "Wormer- en Jisperveld" in the municipality of Wormerland, as seen in a roughly northernly direction from the road between the villages Jisp and Neck.

- Flag Coat of arms

- Location in the Netherlands Location in the province of North Holland in the Netherlands
- Coordinates: 52°30′24″N 4°50′56″E
- Country: Netherlands
- Province: North Holland
- Municipality: Wormerland

Area
  - Total: 2.37 km^{2} (0.92 sq mi)
- Elevation: −0.8 m (−2.6 ft)

Population (2021)
  - Total: 705
  - Density: 297/km^{2} (770/sq mi)
- Time zone: UTC+1 (CET)
  - Summer (DST): UTC+2 (CEST)
- Postal code: 1546
- Dialing code: 075

Jisp is a village in the Dutch province of North Holland. It is a part of the municipality of Wormerland, and lies about 8 km west of Purmerend.

== History ==
Jisp, in older forms Gispe (1328, 1387), Gyspe (1344), is named after a river with the same name, that had an open connection to the North Sea. Its river name is a composite of 'gis' and 'apa'. The first part means 'gisten', to foam. The second part has the meaning of water, indicating a place where by tidal influences foaming water occurred. River names containing 'apa' have possibly a prehistoric and Celtic origin, dating back to a period where humans did only live in the area in certain periods of the year to herd their cattle.

Jisp is a former whaling village. It used to be an island in the Zuiderzee. It was a separate municipality until 1991, when it merged with Wormer and Wijdewormer to form the new municipality of Wormerland.

== Geography ==
Jisp is located in the Wormer- en Jisperveld.

== Demographics ==
In 2001, the village of Jisp had 318 inhabitants. The built-up area of the village was 4.3 km^{2}, and contained 116 residences. The statistical area "Jisp", which also can include the surrounding countryside, had a population of 1110 in 2020.
