= Spijkerboor =

Spijkerboor is the name of two villages in the Netherlands:

- Spijkerboor (North Holland)
- Spijkerboor (Drenthe)
