= Gerrit Jacob Boekenoogen =

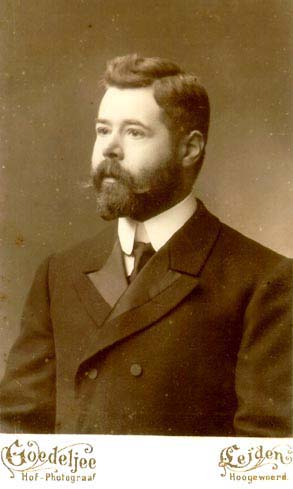
Gerrit Jacob Boekenoogen (date of photograph unknown)

Gerrit Jacob Boekenoogen (1868–1930) was a Dutch philologist with particular interests in dialectology, lexicography, and the folklore of the Low Countries.

== Life ==
Boekenoogen was born on 18 April 1868 in Wormerveer to Agatha Maria van Gelder and Lukas Fredrik Boekenoogen, a merchant who held office in local government. After secondary school, he began studying the Dutch language and Dutch-language literature at Amsterdam University, but transferred to Leiden University to follow his mentor, Jacob Verdam. He graduated in 1893. On 1 February 1896 he was awarded a doctorate for a dissertation about Zaans, the language of the Zaan district. He spent the rest of his working life on the editorial staff of the Woordenboek der Nederlandsche Taal, the most comprehensive dictionary of the Dutch language, compiling entries in the sections Boven–Bram, Opaal–Ozon and P–Pleizier. He also collected and wrote about riddles, children's rhymes, folksongs, folktales and fairy tales, as well as the chapbook literature of the handpress era, and edited several tales and romances for publication. He never married but was active in the Mennonite community and wrote for De Zondagsbode. He died in Leiden on 26 August 1930.

== Publications ==
As author

- "Onze rijmen", De Gids 1893, 4, pp. 1–34, 266–303.
- De Zaansche volkstaal, 2 vols, Leiden, 1897.
- "Nederlandsche sprookjes en vertelsels", Volkskunde, vol. 13 (1900–1901), pp. 111–121, 168–172, 193–205, 240–251; vol. 14 (1901–1902), pp. 36–42, 79–87, 114–125, 198–205, 234–242; vol. 15 (1903), pp. 34–41, 72–78, 110–116, 185–193, 227–236; vol. 16 (1904), pp. 51–54, 94–103, 138–144, 244–251; vol. 17 (1905), pp. 17–23, 53–63, 95–106, 168–173; vol. 18 (1906), pp. 25–33, 68–75, 92–97, 222–224; vol. 19 (1907–1908), pp. 22–30, 61–67, 106–108, 151–157, 229–235; vol. 20 (1909), pp. 59–64, 109–114; vol. 21 (1910), pp. 76–78, 221–225.
- "Raadsels en raadselsprookjes", Handelingen en Mededeelingen van de Maatschappij der Nederlandsche Letterkunde, 1900–1901, pp. 36–81.
- "Over middeleeuwsche Vlaamsche miniaturen", Onze Eeuw, vol. 4:4 (1904), pp. 103–146.
- "De Nederlandsche volksboeken", Tijdschrift voor Boek- en Bibliotheekwezen, vol. 3 (1905), pp. 107–142.
- "Nederlandsche sprookjes uit de 17de en het begin der 18de eeuw", Volkskunde, vol. 20 (1909), pp. 129–157, 193–205; vol. 21 (1910), pp. 7–21.
- "Geparodieerde sermoenen", Volkskunde, vol. 21 (1910), pp. 101–111, 150–155.
- with E. H. van Heurck, Histoire de l'imagerie populaire flamande et de ses rapports avec les imageries étrangères (Brussels, 1910)
- "Waar de kinderen vandaan komen", Volkskunde, vol. 22 (1911), pp. 18–24, 143–151, 193–198; vol. 23 (1912), pp. 29–37.
- "Een en ander over de lectuur van het Vlaamsche volk vóór Conscience", Verslagen en Mededeelingen der Koninklijke Vlaamsche Academie voor Taal- en Letterkunde, 1912, pp. 677–690.
- "Een Antwerpsch Driekoningenlied uit de 17de eeuw en andere parodieën van het sterrelied", Volkskunde, vol. 25 (1914), pp. 24–36.

As editor

- Historie van Floris ende Blancefleur (1903) – a Dutch version of Floris and Blancheflour
- Jan van Beverley (1903) – an apocryphal legend of John of Beverley
- Van den jongen geheeten Jacke (1905)
- Die evangelien vanden spinrocke (1910)
- Historie vanden ridder metter Swane (1931; published posthumously) – a Dutch version of the Knight of the Swan
