= Geertruid Adriaansdochter =

Geertruid Adriaansdochter (?? in Wormer – 1573 in IJpesloot near Amsterdam), was a Dutch farmer. She was hanged by Protestant farmers as a Catholic when she attempted to bring food to her brother, a Catholic priest in Amsterdam, who was at the point under siege by the Protestants. She was used in the propaganda during the war as a Catholic martyr.

== See also ==
- Catholic Church in the Netherlands
