= Schoonselhof cemetery =

Cemetery in Antwerp, Belgium

Coordinates: 51°09′58″N 04°22′01″E

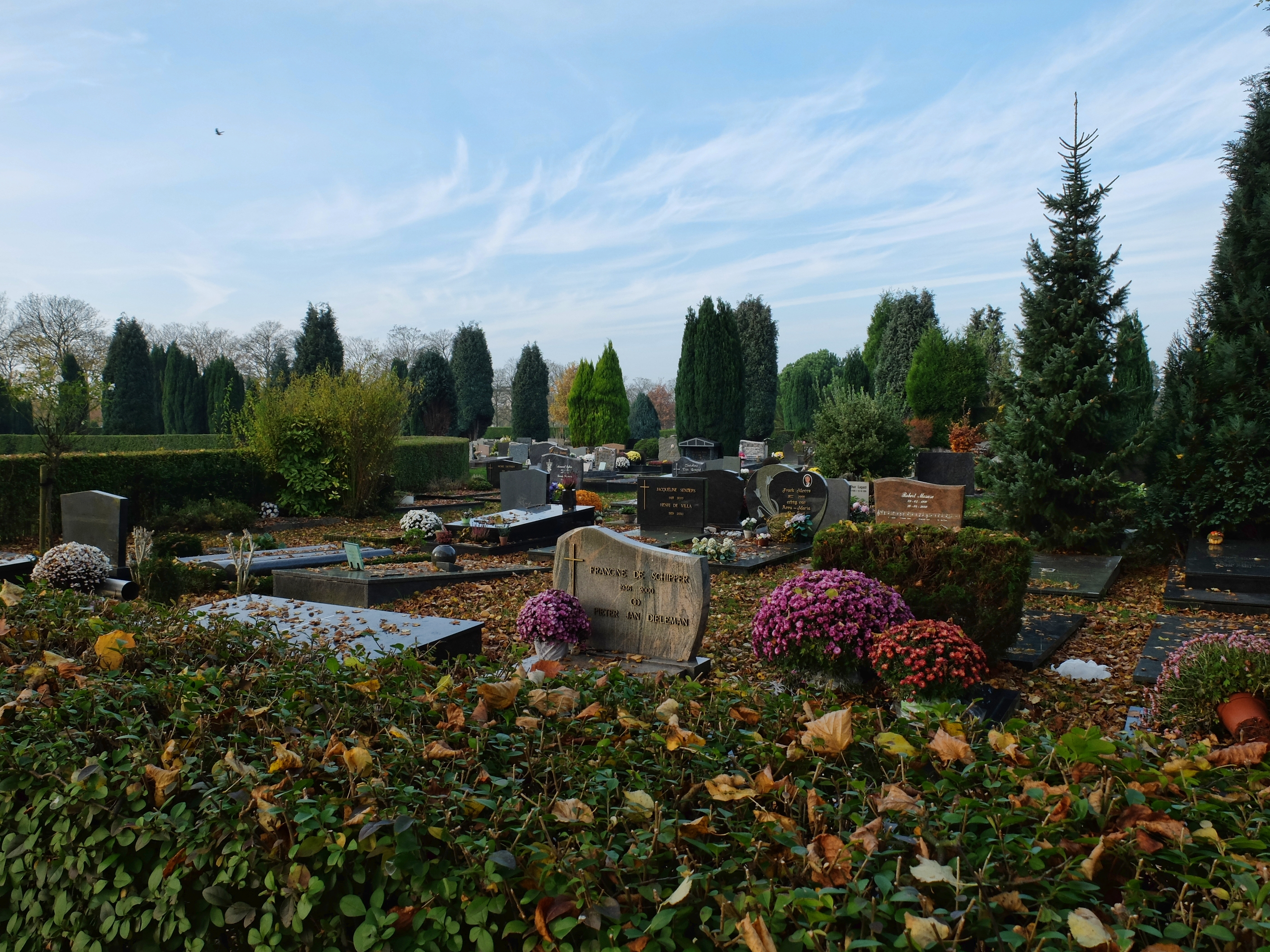
View on a part of the cemetery

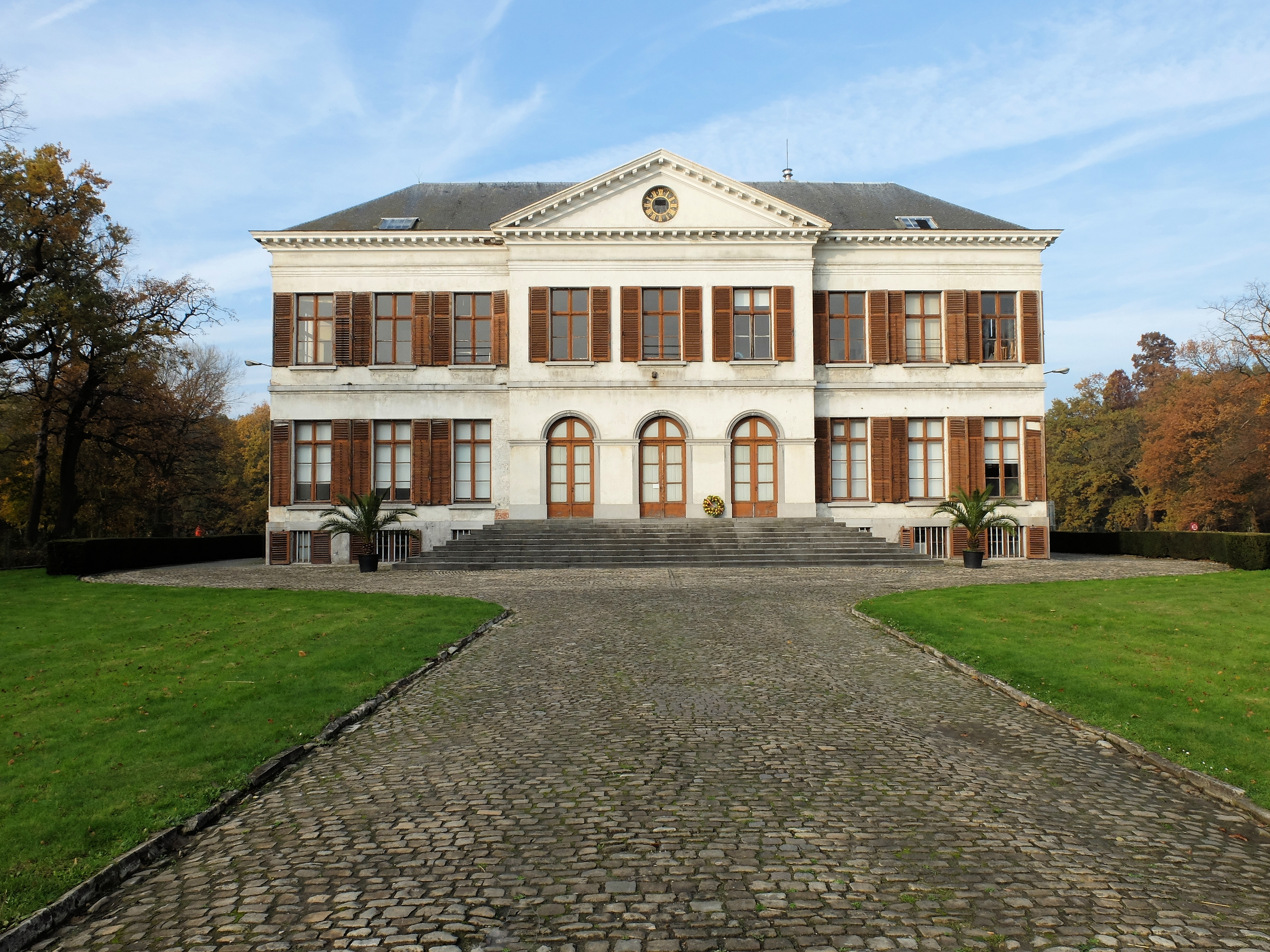
Castle Schoonselhof

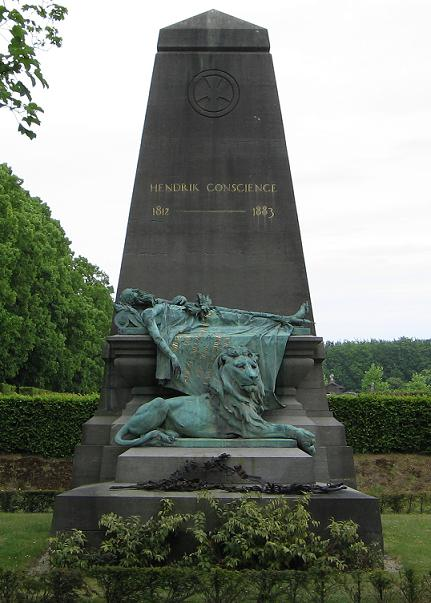
Tomb of Hendrik Conscience

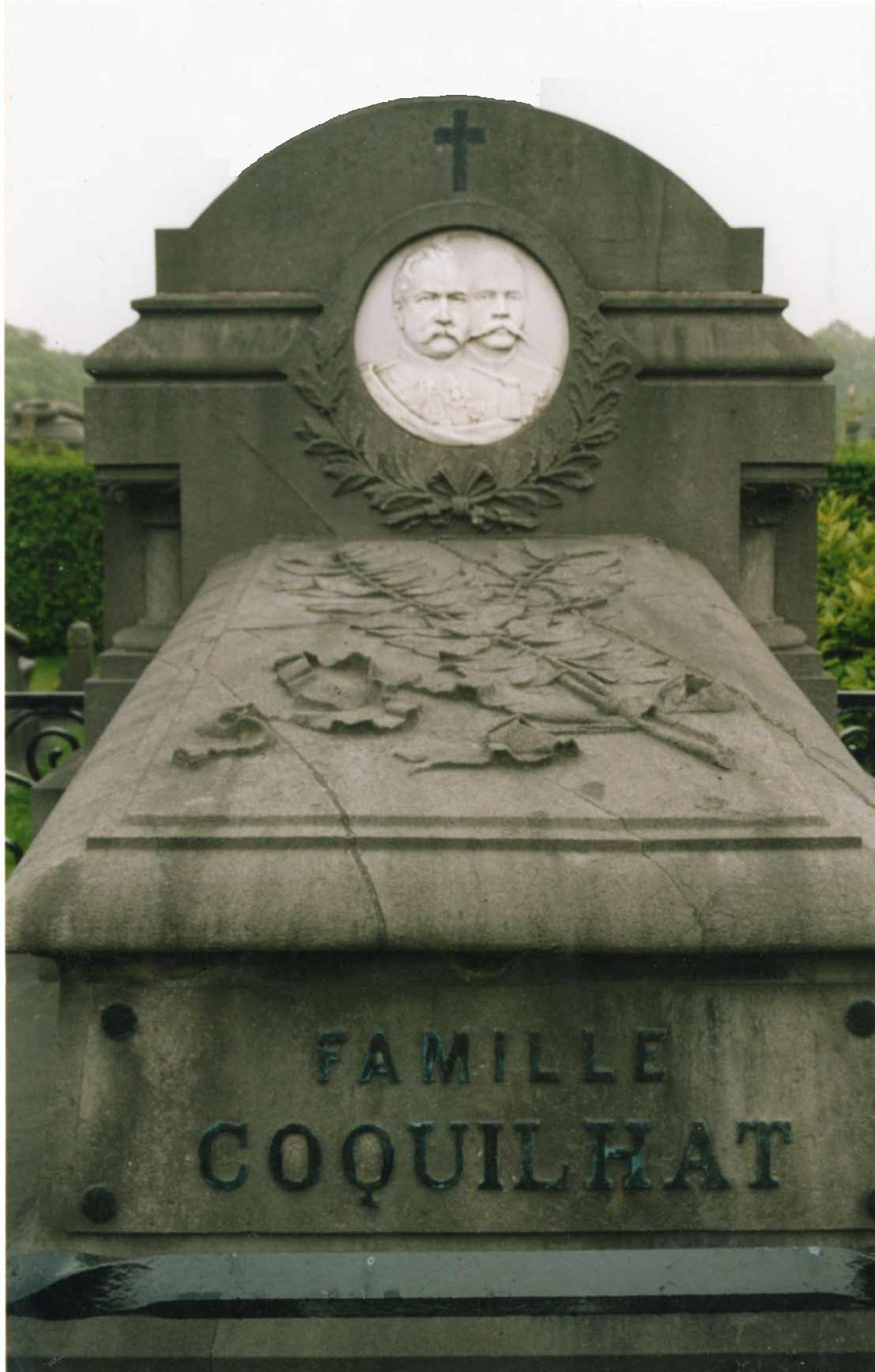
Coquilhat tomb

Schoonselhof Cemetery (Antwerpen Schoonselhof) is located in Hoboken, Antwerp, a suburb of Antwerp, Belgium.

Schoonselhof Cemetery has an Islamic and Jewish section.

There is also a Commonwealth war graves plot containing the graves of 1,557 British Commonwealth service personnel who died in the World Wars, 101 from World War I and 1,455 from World War II, besides 16 Polish and 1 French war burial, a United States airman attached to the British Royal Air Force, and 16 non-war graves, mainly of merchant seamen. The plot was laid out by the Principal Architect of the Commonwealth War Graves Commission, Philip Hepworth.

The cemetery was mentioned in the TV show GRIMM, Episode 14 of Season 1.

== Notable interments ==
- Roger Avermaete (1893–1988), author
- Lode Baekelmans (1879–1965), writer
- Désiré Beaurain (1881–1963), Olympic fencer
- Peter Benoit (1834–1901), composer
- Pierre Bruno Bourla (1783–1866), architect
- Gaston Burssens (1896–1965), writer
- Hendrik Conscience (1812–1883), writer
- Jan Cox (1919–1980), painter
- Henri De Braekeleer (1840–1888), artist
- Herman De Coninck (1944–1997), writer and journalist
- Willem Elsschot (1882–1960), author
- Vic Gentils (1919–1997), artist and sculptor
- Marnix Gijsen (1899–1984), writer
- Ferre Grignard (1939–1982), rock singer
- Emiel van Heurck (1871–1931), folklorist
- Paul Mara (1920–1998), artist
- Alice Nahon (1896–1933), poet
- Hugues C. Pernath (1931–1975), writer
- Armand Preud'Homme (1904–1986), composer
- John Rankin Rathbone (1910–1940 †), British MP, (CWGC)
- François Rom (1882–1942), Olympic fencer
- Bernard Tokkie (1867–1942), opera singer
- August Van Cauwelaert (1885–1945), author
- Jos Van Eynde (1907–1992), journalist
- Paul Van Ostaijen (1896–1928), writer
- Gerard Walschap (1898–1989), writer
