= Westknollendam =

- Village
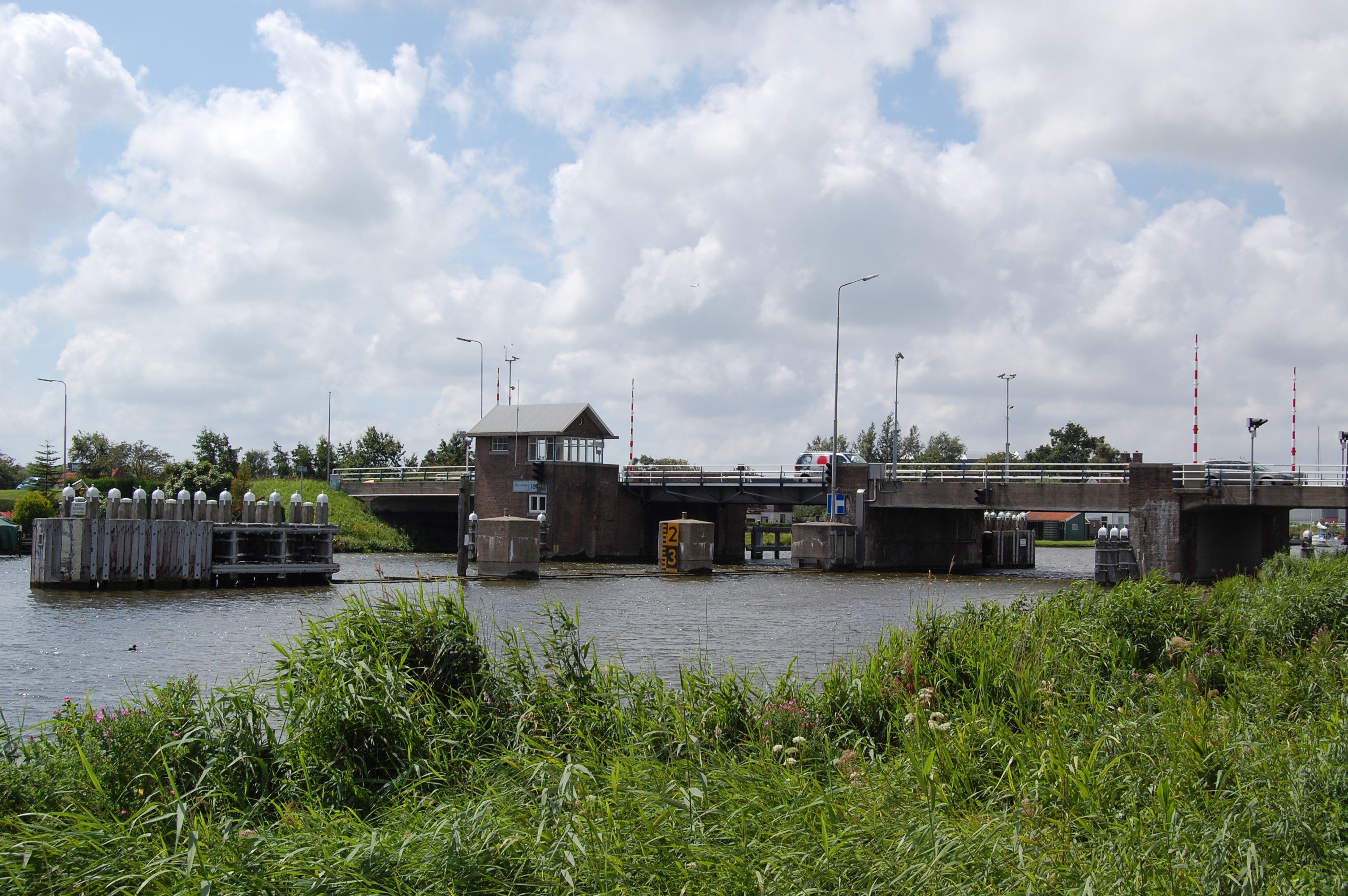
- Beatrixbridge at the Tapsloot near Westknollendam

- Flag

- Location in the Netherlands Location in the province of North Holland in the Netherlands
- Coordinates: 52°31′N 4°47′E
- Country: Netherlands
- Province: North Holland
- Municipality: Zaanstad

Area
  - Total: 0.35 km^{2} (0.14 sq mi)
- Elevation: −0.4 m (−1.3 ft)

Population (2021)
  - Total: 455
  - Density: 1,300/km^{2} (3,400/sq mi)
- Time zone: UTC+1 (CET)
  - Summer (DST): UTC+2 (CEST)
- Postal code: 1525
- Dialing code: 075

Westknollendam is a village in the northwest Netherlands. It is located in the municipality of Zaanstad, North Holland, about 15 km northwest of Amsterdam. The village is located along the Zaan river. On the opposite shore is Oostknollendam, in the municipality of Wormerland.
