= Wormer =

Town in the Dutch province of North Holland

- Town
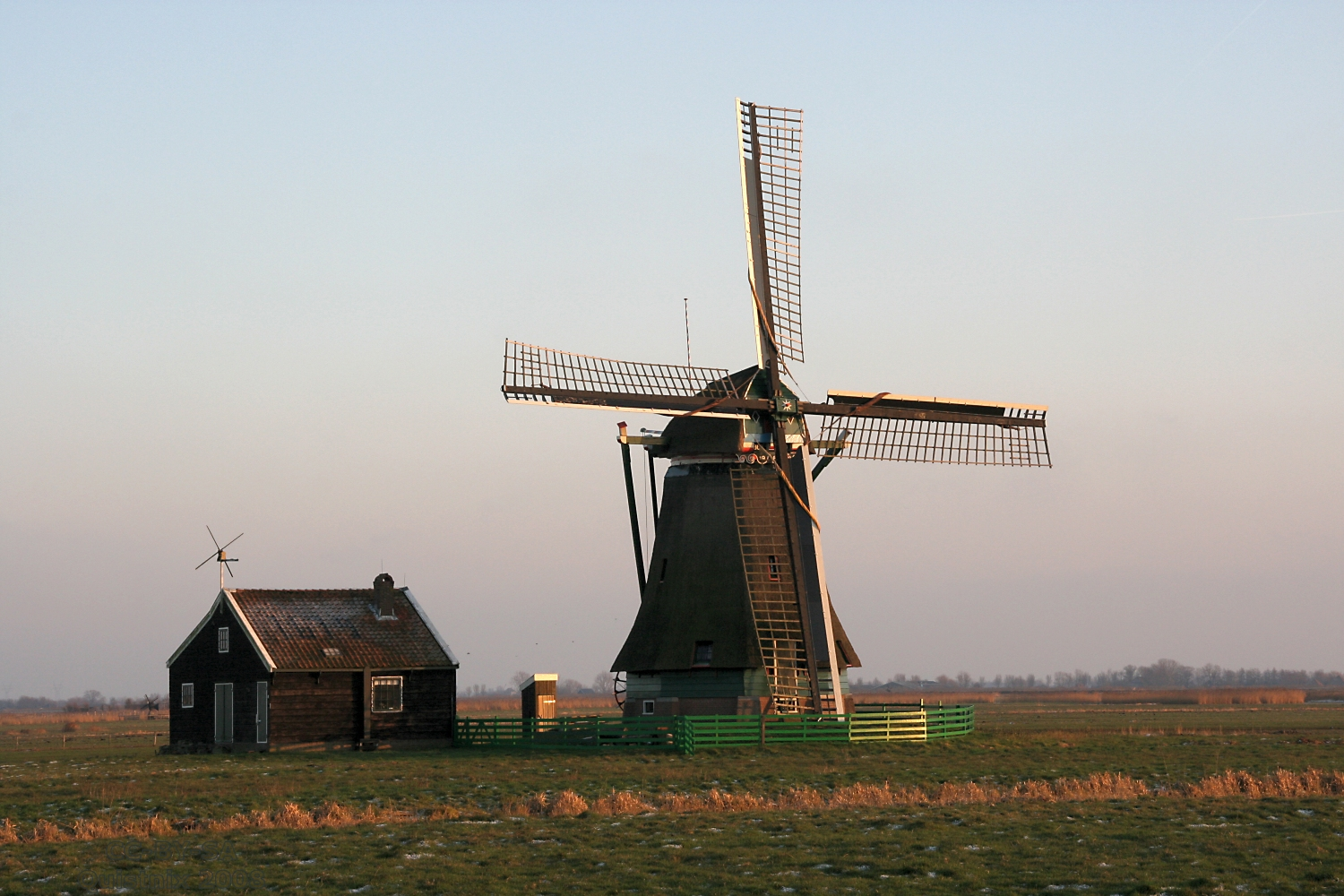
- Windmill De Koker in Wormer

- Location in the Netherlands Location in the province of North Holland in the Netherlands
- Coordinates: 52°30′N 4°49′E
- Country: Netherlands
- Province: North Holland
- Municipality: Wormerland

Area
  - Total: 10.14 km^{2} (3.92 sq mi)
- Elevation: −0.8 m (−2.6 ft)

Population (2021)
  - Total: 12,890
  - Density: 1,271/km^{2} (3,292/sq mi)
- Time zone: UTC+1 (CET)
  - Summer (DST): UTC+2 (CEST)
- Postal code: 1531
- Dialing code: 075

Wormer is a town in the Dutch province of North Holland. It is a part of the municipality of Wormerland, and lies about 13 km northwest of Amsterdam.

The town is situated in the Zaan district, on the eastern side of the river Zaan, across from Wormerveer. The town is surrounded by the nature area Wormer- en Jisperveld.

The village of Oostknollendam, the polder Schaalsmeer (reclaimed in 1631), the polder Enge Wormer (reclaimed in 1634) and a part of the Markerpolder also historically belong to the area of Wormer.

Wormer, together with Engewormer (Wormer c.a.), was a separate municipality until 1991, when it became a part of the new municipality of Wormerland.

== History ==
The inhabitants of Wormer repulsed several attacks of the Frisians and West Frisians in 1280. Floris V, Count of Holland rewarded this with an exemption from paying toll in Holland, an important privilege at that time. Important skirmishes between Spanish troops and the Geuzen took place in Wormer during the Eighty Years' War. At Whitsunday (Pentecost) 30 May 1574, 1400 Spanish soldiers tried to capture Wormer and Jisp. They were crushingly defeated by a combined force of locals, Geuzen and filibusters, bringing an end to the Spanish tyranny in the Waterland area. In the following century Wormer became very prosperous from the production of beschuit (rusk). At least 130 bakeries in the town were once supplying the countless ships of the Dutch East India Company. Other important industrial activities in the town during this period were the production of starch and the processing of whale blubber. At least 66 windmills were once built in Wormer, but nowadays only one windmill (de Koker) has been preserved.

== Famous (former) residents of Wormer ==
- Geertruid Adriaansdochter, Catholic martyr
- Thijs Al, mountain biker and cyclo-cross racer
- George Baker (Hans Bouwens, 1944), singer and songwriter of the George Baker Selection
- Rop Gonggrijp (1968), hacker, internet pioneer
- Pieter Jan Leeuwerink (1962), Dutch international volleyball player († 2004)
- G.W. Sok, vocalist of anarcho-punk band The Ex
- Terrie, guitarist of anarcho-punk band The Ex
- Micky van de Ven (2001), professional footballer
- Thorwald Veneberg, professional road bicycle racer
- Piet de Wit (1946), track bicycle racer, world champion stayering in 1966 and 1967
- Marcel van Roosmalen (1968), Dutch journalist, columnist and writer
