= Emiel van Heurck =

Belgian folklorist (1871–1931)

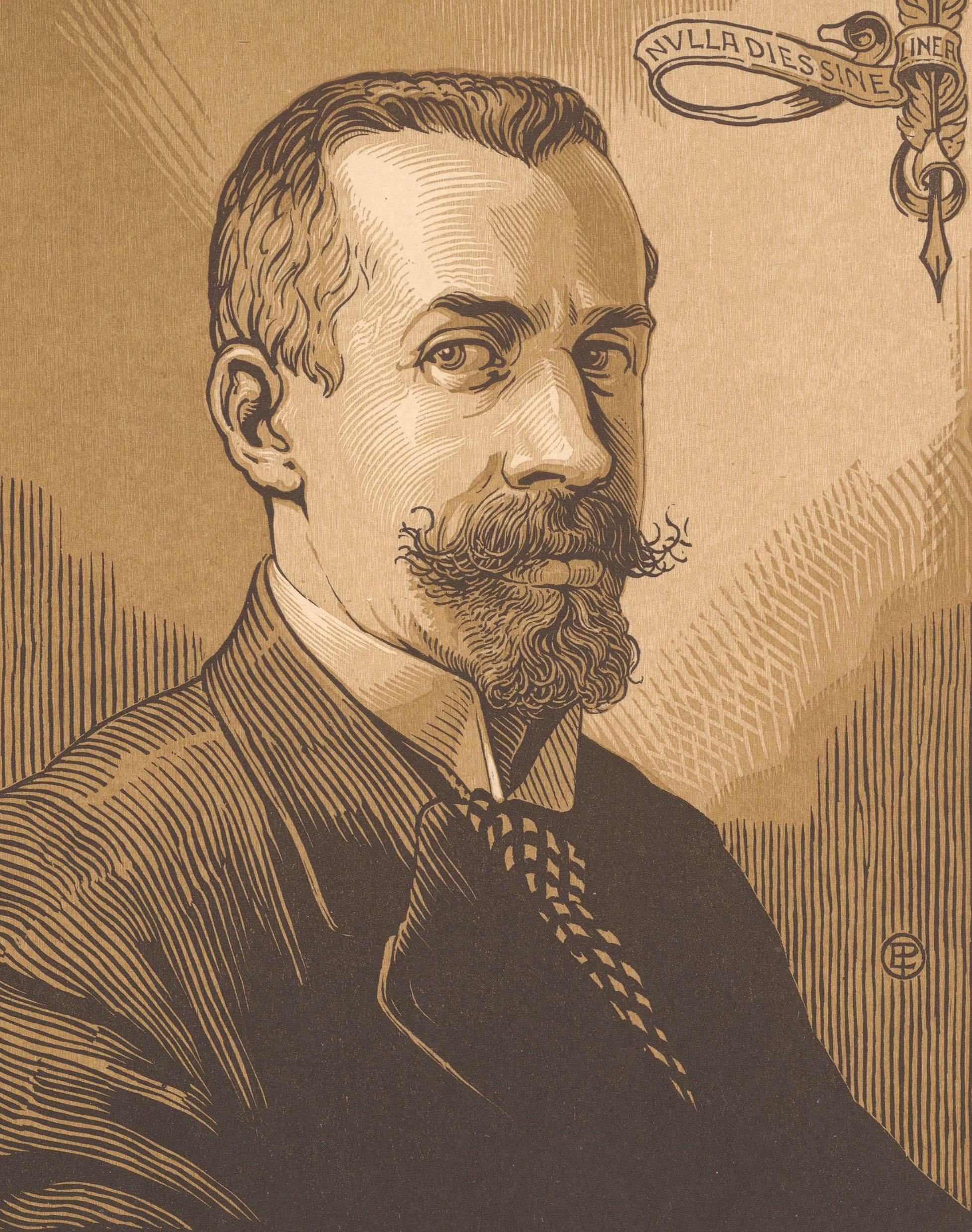
- Emiel van Heurck, illustration by Edward Pellens
- Born: 10 January 1871; Antwerp
- Died: 30 July 1931 (aged 60)
- Resting place: Schoonselhof cemetery
- Occupation: Folklorist
- Relatives: Henri van Heurck
- Writing career
- Subject: Religiousity
- Notable work: Histoire de l'imagerie populaire
- Notable awards: Knight in the Order of Leopold

Emiel Henri van Heurck (10 January 1871 – 30 July 1931) was a Belgian folklorist. He published on religiosity, most notably on pilgrimage and holy cards.

== Biography ==
Van Heurck was born on 10 January 1871, in Antwerp, to a Francophone family. His father, Henri van Heurck (1839–1909), was a renowned botanist who wanted his son to follow in his (scientific) footsteps. Emiel, however, was more interested in journalism and writing and particularly in Belgian folklore. He suffered from depression, and never finished his engineering studies, taking a day job in an office where his lack of diploma prevented his advancement.

He studied folklore nightly, he said, from 7:30 to 11:30, and he maintained a connection to the Volkskundemuseum in Antwerp. With Gerrit Jacob Boekenoogen (1868–1930) he published three volumes on popular imagery, including Histoire de l'imagerie populaire Flamande (1910). In 1930 they published a companion volume on Dutch imagery, Histoire de l'imagerie des Pays-Bas. Van Heurck also collected such prints and images.

Van Heurck was on intimate terms with Belgian writer Julius Pée (1871–1951) from 1893 to 1896, when the friendship was disturbed for unknown reasons, until an exchange of letters in 1930, not long before Van Heurck's death. Pée was a scholar of the Dutch author Multatuli; Van Heurck shared this interest, having translated Multatuli's work into French for Mercure de France, and the story "La sainte vierge" for Le Spectateur catholique. He was made a knight in the Order of Leopold, and died on 30 July 1931, after a long and painful illness. He is buried at Schoonselhof cemetery.

== Notable titles ==
- Histoire de l'imagerie populaire (Brussels 1910, Paris 1930)
- Les drapelets de pélérinage (Antwerp 1922)
- Voyage autour de ma bibliothèque (1927)
- Les images de dévotion anversoises du XVle au XIXe siècle (1930)
