= Neck, Netherlands =

Neck
- Village
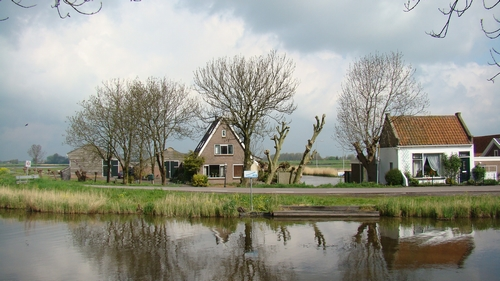

- Location in the Netherlands Location in the province of North Holland in the Netherlands
- Coordinates: 52°30′30″N 4°54′45″E
- Country: Netherlands
- Province: North Holland
- Municipality: Wormerland

Area
  - Total: 0.54 km^{2} (0.21 sq mi)
- Elevation: −1.9 m (−6.2 ft)

Population (2021)
  - Total: 1,150
  - Density: 2,100/km^{2} (5,500/sq mi)
- Time zone: UTC+1 (CET)
  - Summer (DST): UTC+2 (CEST)
- Postal code: 1456
- Dialing code: 0299

Neck is a village in the northwest Netherlands. It is located in the municipality of Wormerland, North Holland, about 3 km west of Purmerend.

The village was first mentioned in 1328 as "sic: van Hicke", and means "neck" which refers to the narrowest point of the waterway separating the Beemster from the Wormer.

The polder mill Nekkermolen dates from 1631. In 1878, a pumping station was installed, but the wind mill has remained in service to this day to lend a hand, because the water in the polder rises fast during a storm.
