= Bernard Tokkie =

Belgian opera singer

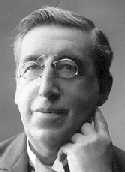
- Bernard Tokkie
- Born: 13 December 1867; Antwerp, Belgium
- Died: February 1942 (aged 74)
- Occupation: singer

Bernard Tokkie (13 December 1867 – February 1942) was a Flemish opera singer of Jewish origin.

== Working towards a Flemish opera ==
The Antwerp-born Tokkie studied at the Royal Flemish Music Conservatory. He completed schooling with Hendrik Fontaine.

He performed for the first time in 1893 as a singer on the opening of the Dutch Lyrical Theatre, the Nederlandsch Lyrisch Tooneel, as Kuno in Der Freischütz (in Dutch: Vrijschutter). The Nederlandsch Lyrisch Tooneel had first been established in 1890 as a division of the Dutch theatre, but became an independent opera company by 1893. The name had only been changed into Vlaamsche Opera, on the occasion of the inauguration of a new building in 1907.

With Edward Keurvels, Albert Baets and Hendrik Fontaine, Tokkie took financial responsibility for the new Flemish opera in the period 1893–96, at a time when the viability of this company was still questioned. Due to his merit as a singer, he was able to partially absorb the losses he suffered as an administrator. That the opera was not being a profitable enterprise meant that Tokkie had to remain active within the Antwerp diamond business, at that time controlled by the Jews.

Twice, he became director of the Flemish opera: once together, with Jef Judels, for eight years, between 1902 and 1909, and a second time, between 1923 and 1931, together with Fé Derickx.

== Jew and flamingant ==
Tokkie was a motivated Jewish flamingant. As a bass singer, he sang for instance Jan Blockx's song Ons Vaderland in 1897 on the forbidden Flemish demonstration in the Belgian capital, Brussels. Furthermore, he sang in the opera the Bride of the Sea (Bruid der Zee) by Jan Blockx and the Magic Flute by Wolfgang Amadeus Mozart.

During the First World War, he settled in England. There, he worked for two years in a munitions factory, while singing for other Belgian refugees and for wounded soldiers.

Bernard Tokkie could not escape from the anti-Semitism within the liberal circles in which he was involved. He never lost his Jewish roots. He sang for instance in the choir of the great Dutch synagogue in Antwerp Bouwmeesterstraat. In 1926, he became director of the Jewish Theatre Studies, the Joodsche Theaterstudies.

Tokkie died in 1942 and expressed the wish to be buried as within Jewish tradition. Under the war administration, Antwerp's city council gave him a funeral wreath. The deputy mayor for culture and former Rexist and member of the Flemish National Union, the VNV, Odiel Daem, rend him his last tribute. Bernard Tokkie's tomb can be found on the Israelite or Jewish section in the Schoonselhof Cemetery. It had been designed by the Jewish architect Joseph de Lange.
