= Wijdewormer =

- Hamlet
- Coat of arms

- Location in the Netherlands Location in the province of North Holland in the Netherlands
- Coordinates: 52°29′29″N 4°52′11″E
- Country: Netherlands
- Province: North Holland
- Municipality: Wormerland

Area
  - Total: 8.26 km^{2} (3.19 sq mi)
- Elevation: −1.9 m (−6.2 ft)

Population (2021)
  - Total: 275
  - Density: 33.3/km^{2} (86.2/sq mi)
- Time zone: UTC+1 (CET)
  - Summer (DST): UTC+2 (CEST)
- Postal code: 1456
- Dialing code: 0299

Wijdewormer is a hamlet in the Dutch province of North Holland. It is located in the municipality of Wormerland, about 5 km east of the town of Wormer, in the polder "De Wijde Wormer". De Wijde Wormer was poldered in 1626.

Wijdewormer was a separate municipality between 1817 and 1991, when it became a part of Wormerland.
