= Zaan =

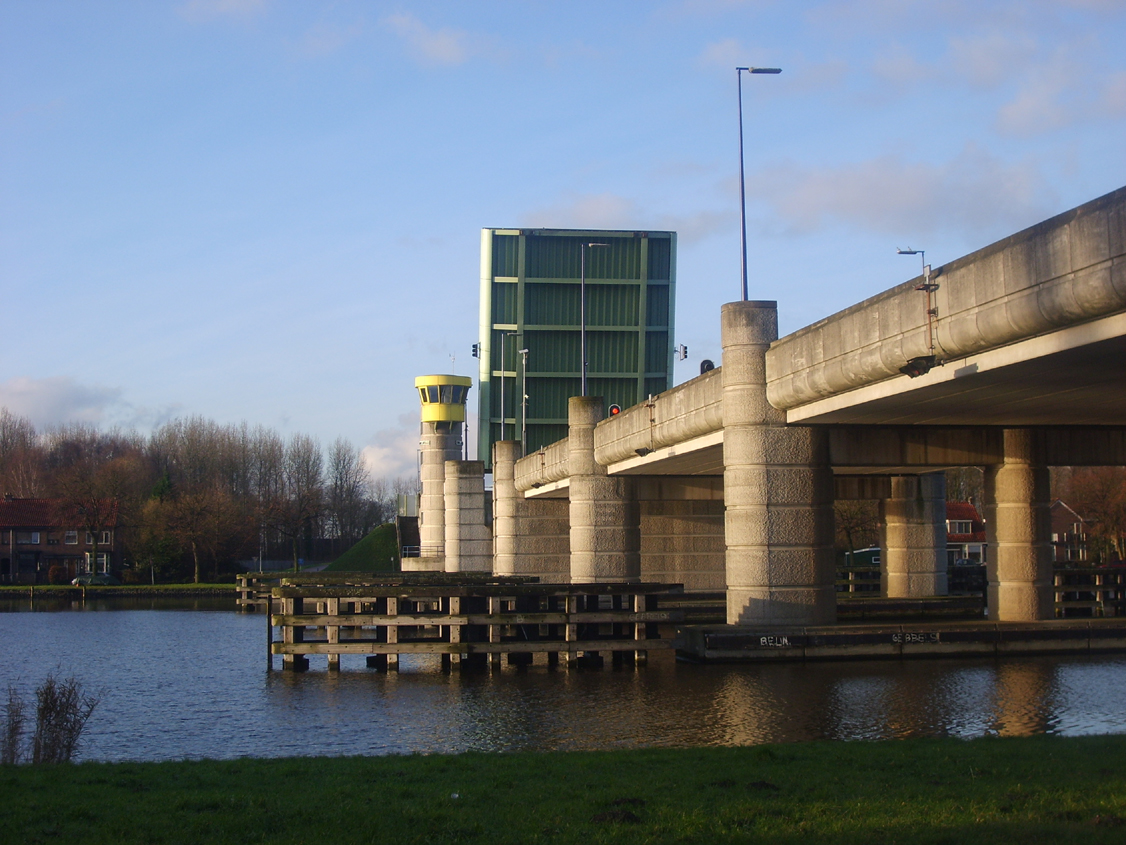
- Den Uylbridge in Zaandam, the Netherlands.

- Mouth of Zaan

Location
- Country: Netherlands
- District: Zaan District

Physical characteristics
- Mouth
  - coordinates: 52°28′11″N 4°49′35″E

The Zaan (Dutch pronunciation: [zaːn]) is a small river in the province of North Holland in the northwestern Netherlands and the name of a district through which it runs. The river was originally a side arm of the IJ bay and travels 13.5 kilometres (8 1/2 miles) through the municipalities of Zaanstad ("Zaan City") and Wormerland north of Amsterdam, from West-Knollendam in the north to Zaandam in the south, where it empties into the IJ.

The municipality of Zaanstad and several towns along the Zaan are named for the river: Koog aan de Zaan, Westzaan, Oostzaan, Zaandijk and the city of Zaandam. The river also runs past Zaanse Schans, a village with historic windmills and houses. It ranks among the top tourist destinations in the Netherlands.

== Panorama view ==
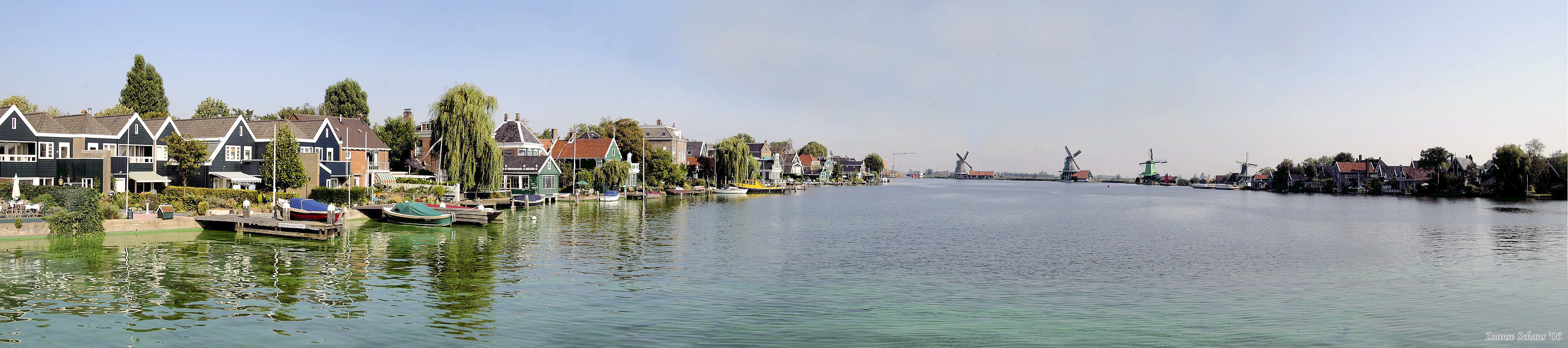
The Zaan at Zaanse Schans

== The Zaan district ==
The region through which the river runs is called the Zaan district (Dutch: Zaanstreek [ˈzaːnstreːk]). It comprises the municipalities of Zaanstad, Oostzaan, and most of Wormerland.

During the Dutch Golden Age in the 17th century, the Zaan district was dotted with windmills with a variety of functions and it is often considered to be one of the world's first industrialized areas. Joining an already considerable number of flour mills were, for example, from 1592 "wood mills" for sawing wood, from 1600 "hemp mills" for extracting fibers from flax and hemp, from 1601 oil mills for crushing oil-bearing seeds and "paint mills" producing dyes and paint, and shortly after paper mills for the production of paper. By the mid-17th century, approximately 900 windmills could be found along the river, some of them still preserved, particularly in the Zaanse Schans neighbourhood of Zaandam, near Zaandijk.

The Zaan district continues to be a heavily industrialized area with many factories, particularly around the city of Zaandam. A number of major Dutch companies, like Ahold and Verkade, were founded in the Zaan district.

The dialect spoken in the Zaan area is known as Zaans. It has some similarities with the West Frisian dialect.

French impressionist painter Claude Monet stayed in Zaandam in the summer of 1871 and produced a series of 24 paintings of the Zaan district, writing to his friend Camille Pissarro that, "there is enough here to paint for an entire lifetime." Monet returned to the Zaan district to paint during visits to the Netherlands in following years.

The name of the Alkmaar-based football club AZ is short for Alkmaar Zaanstreek.
