= Spijkerboor, North Holland =

Spijkerboor
- Hamlet
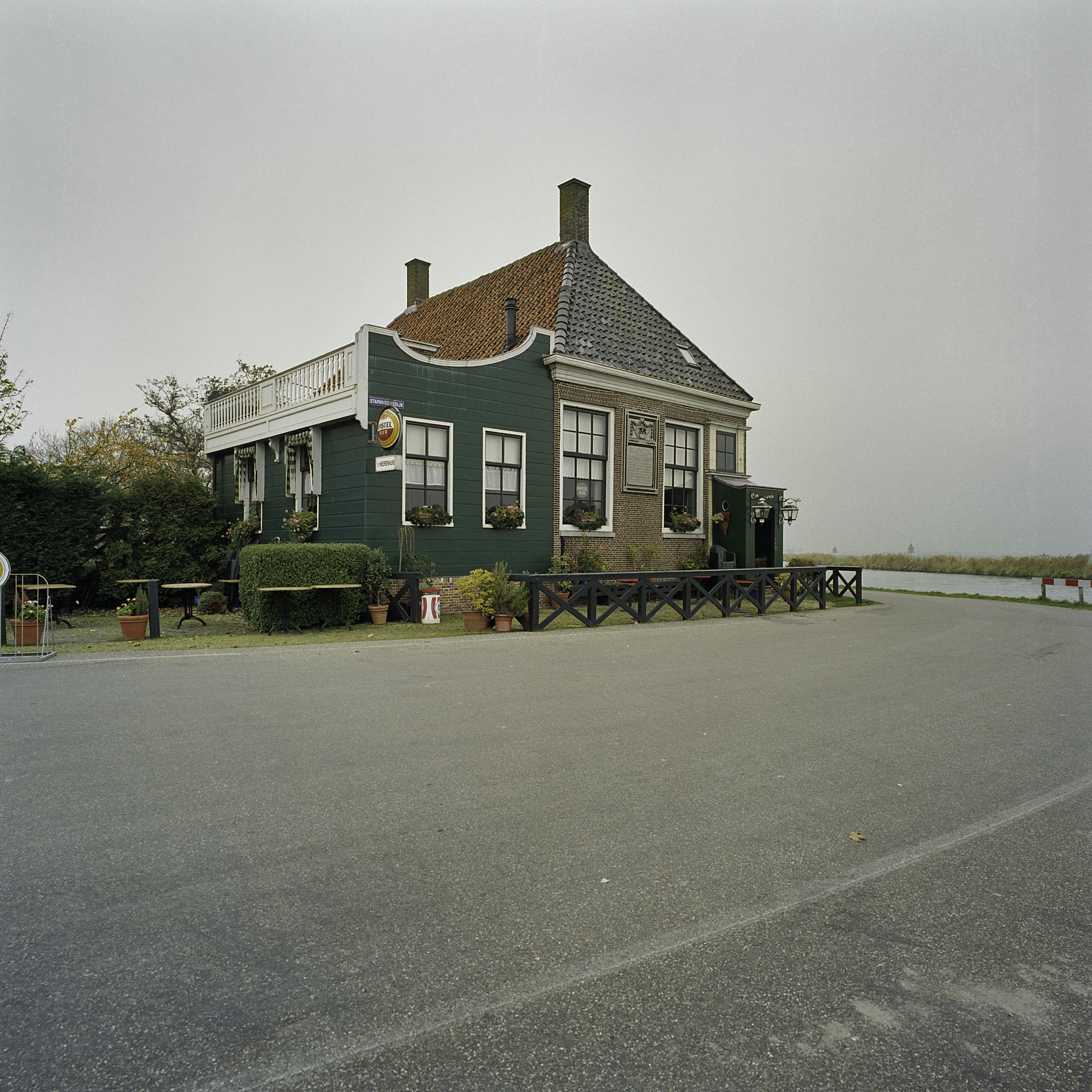
- Pub in Spijkerboor

- Location in the Netherlands Location in the province of North Holland in the Netherlands
- Coordinates: 52°32′18″N 4°50′0″E
- Country: Netherlands
- Province: North Holland
- Municipality: Wormerland

Area
  - Total: 0.57 km^{2} (0.22 sq mi)
- Elevation: −1.0 m (−3.3 ft)

Population (2021)
  - Total: 25
  - Density: 44/km^{2} (110/sq mi)
- Time zone: UTC+1 (CET)
  - Summer (DST): UTC+2 (CEST)
- Postal code: 1458
- Dialing code: 075

Spijkerboor is a hamlet in the Dutch province of North Holland. It is a part of the municipality of Wormerland, and lies about 10 km west of Purmerend.

The village was first mentioned in 1575 as "Spykerboors Gat", and refers to the former meandering waterway between Beemster and Starnmeer. Spijkerboor has place name signs.
