= Wormerland =

- Municipality
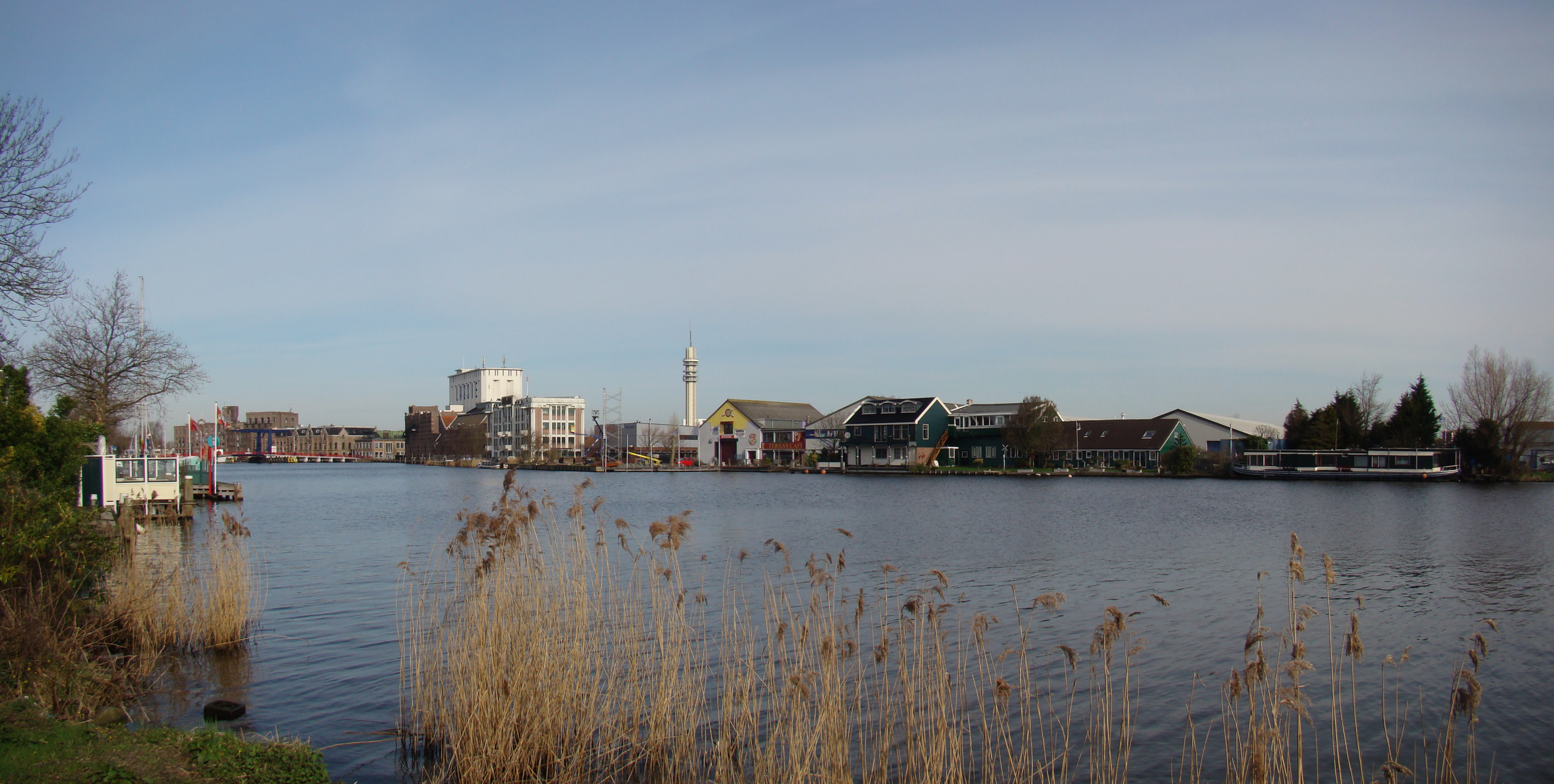
- The town of Wormer

- Flag Coat of arms

- Location in North Holland
- Coordinates: 52°30′N 4°49′E
- Country: Netherlands
- Province: North Holland
- Established: 1 January 1991

Government
  - Body: Municipal council
  - Mayor: Judith Michel-de Jong (PvdA)

Area
  - Total: 45.18 km^{2} (17.44 sq mi)
  - Land: 38.59 km^{2} (14.90 sq mi)
  - Water: 6.59 km^{2} (2.54 sq mi)
- Elevation: −1 m (−3.3 ft)

Population (January 2021)
  - Total: 16,333
  - Density: 423/km^{2} (1,100/sq mi)
- Time zone: UTC+1 (CET)
  - Summer (DST): UTC+2 (CEST)
- Postcode: 1456–1458, 1530–1534, 1546
- Area code: 0299, 075
- Website: www.wormerland.nl

Wormerland (Dutch pronunciation: [ˈʋɔrmərlɑnt]) is a municipality in the Netherlands, in the province of North Holland.

== Population centres ==
The municipality of Wormerland contains the following towns, villages and hamlets:

- Jisp
- Neck
- Oostknollendam
- Spijkerboor
- Wijdewormer
- Wormer

It borders the municipalities of:

- Alkmaar
- Zaanstad
- Oostzaan
- Landsmeer
- Purmerend

== Local government ==
The municipal council of Wormerland consists of 17 seats, which at the 2026 local elections divided as follows:

- VVD - 5 (28.65%)
- GroenLinks - 4 (24.58%)
- Partij voor Ouderen en Veiligheid - 4 (23,1%)
- PvdA - 2 (9.63%)
- CDA - 1 (7.19%)
- D66 - 1 (6.86%)

== Sport facilities ==
Soccer clubs:

- WSV'30 (Wormer Sport Vereniging 1930) - Wormer
- VV Jisp - Jisp
- VV Knollendam - Oostknollendam
- DZS (De Zilveren Schapen) - Neck/Wijdewormer
- PSCK (Parochiële Sport Club Kalf) - Kalf (Located in Wijdewormer)
- ZCFC (Zaandamse Christelijke Football club) - Zaandam (Located in Wijdewormer)

== Notable people ==
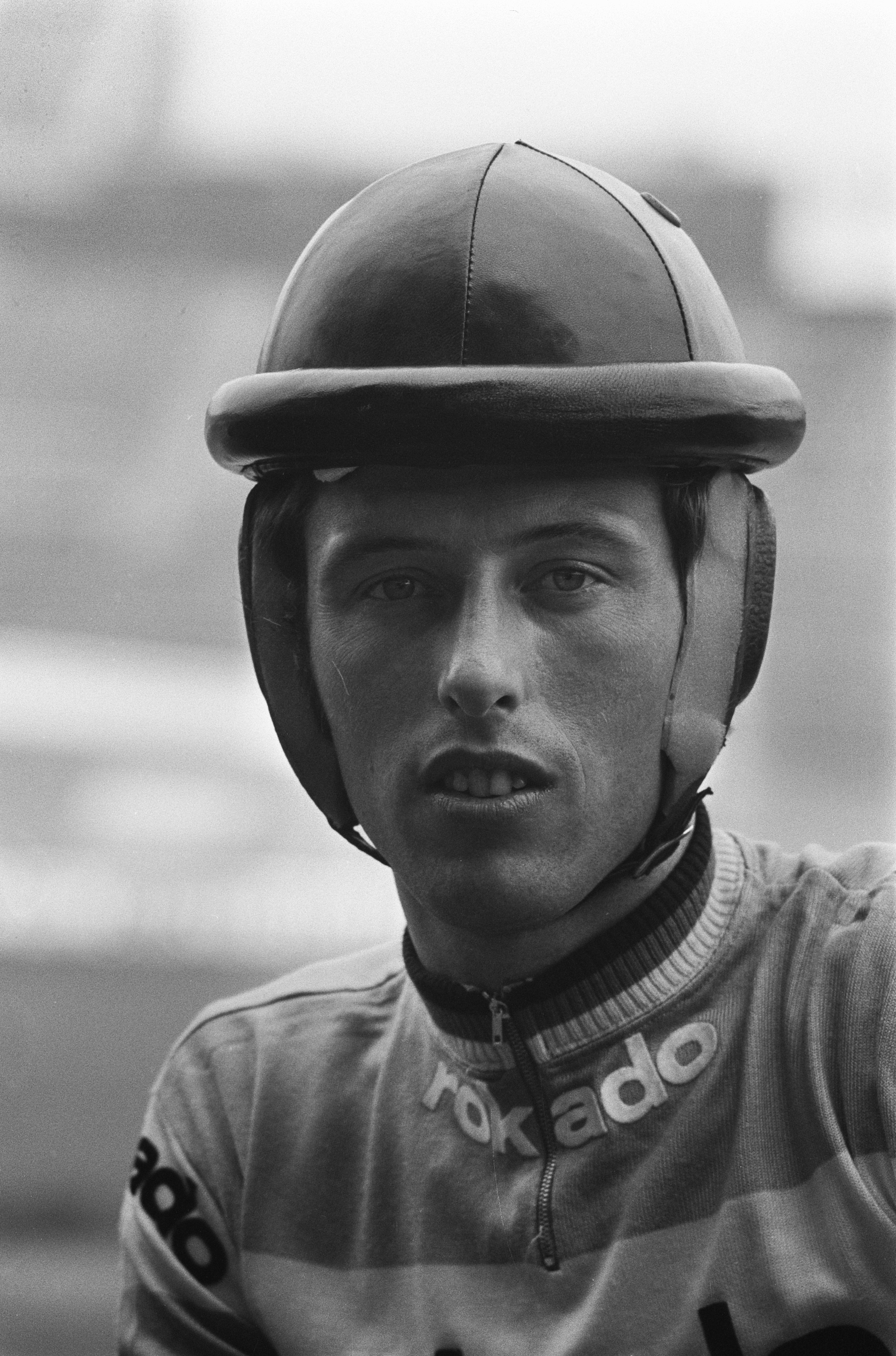
Piet de Wit, 1973

- Tyman Arentsz. Cracht (ca.1590/1600 – 1646) painter who specialized in landscapes and history paintings
- Ewald Kooiman (1938–2009) organist and professor of Romance languages
- Martin Bosma (born 1964) politician and former journalist

=== Sport ===
- Klaas de Groot (1919–1994) wrestler, competed at the 1948 Summer Olympics
- Cees Gravesteijn (born 1928) sprint canoer, competed at the 1948 Summer Olympics
- Dick Wayboer (born 1936) a sailor, competed at the 1964 Summer Olympics
- Piet de Wit (born 1946) retired cyclist and former local bicycle shop owner
- Arend Bloem (1947-2025) sprint canoer who competed at the 1976 Summer Olympics
- Pieter Jan Leeuwerink (1962–2004) volleyball player, competed at the 1988 Summer Olympics

== Gallery ==
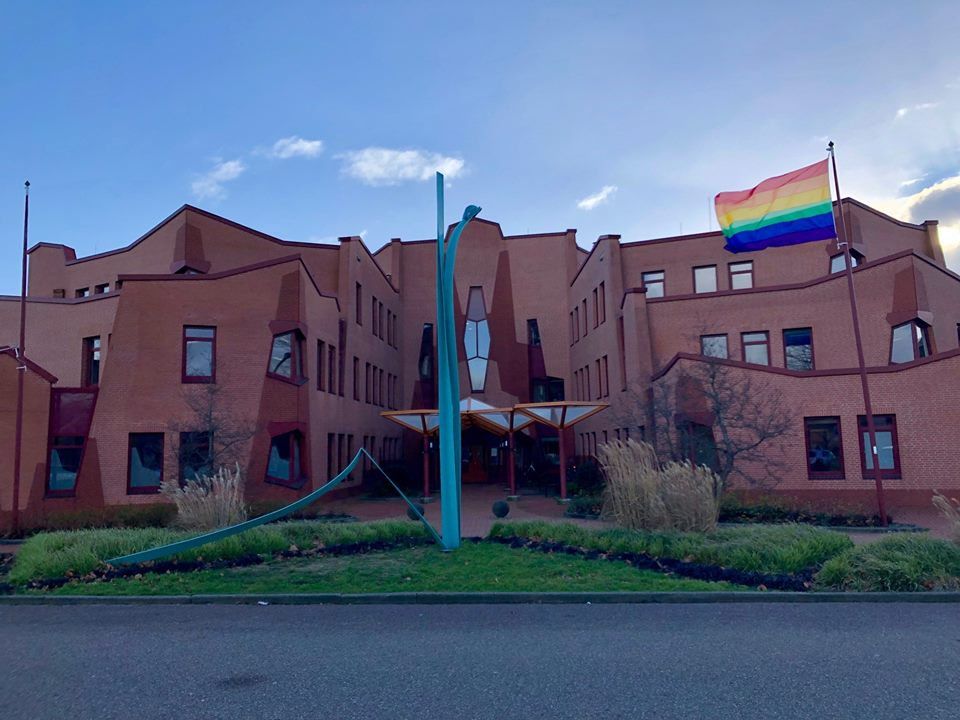
Town hall of Wormerland

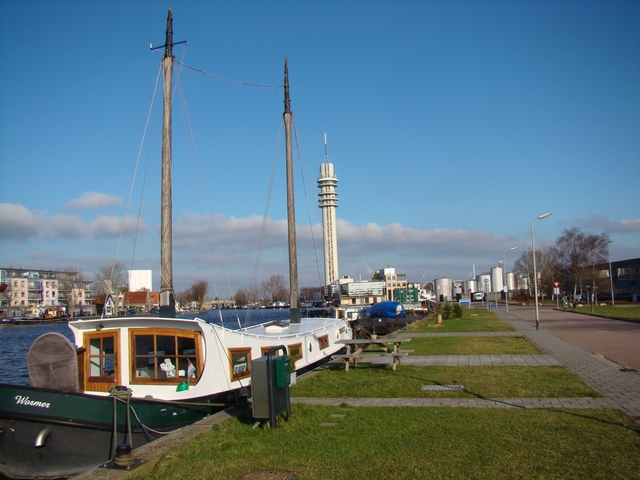
Wormer

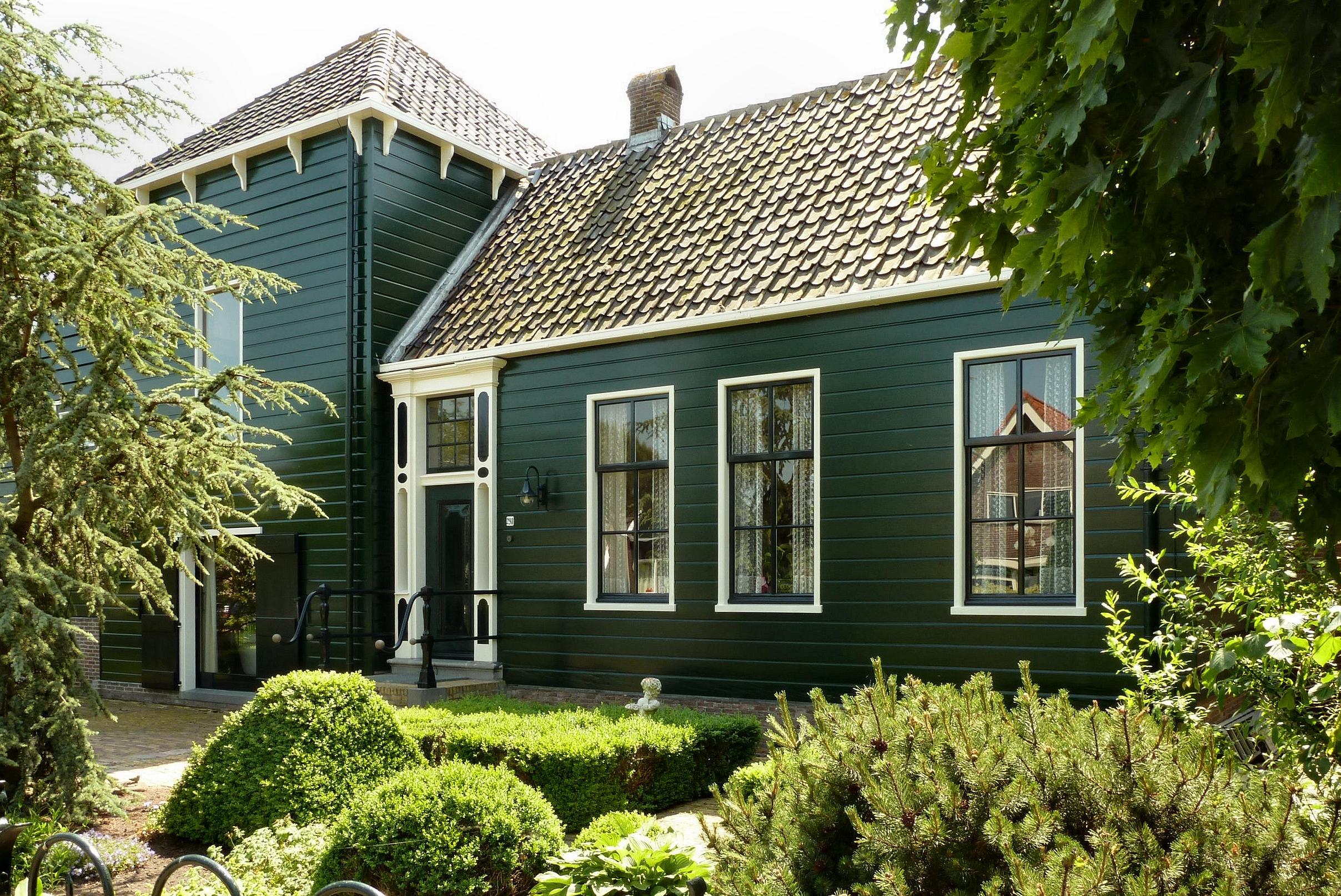
Wormer-Dorpstraat 298

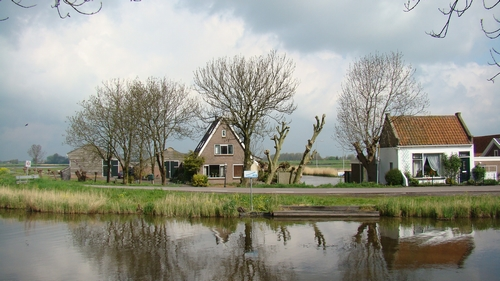
Neck, village in Wormerland municipality
