= Pieter Jan Leeuwerink =

Dutch volleyball player (1962–2004)

Personal information
- Nationality: Dutch
- Born: 10 February 1962; Wormer, Netherlands
- Died: 27 September 2004 (aged 42); Capelle aan den IJssel, Netherlands

Sport
- Sport: Volleyball

Pieter Jan Leeuwerink (10 February 1962 – 27 September 2004) was a Dutch volleyball player. He competed in the men's tournament at the 1988 Summer Olympics.
