= Wormer- en Jisperveld =

Natural area in the Netherlands

Coordinates: 52°31′N 4°50′E

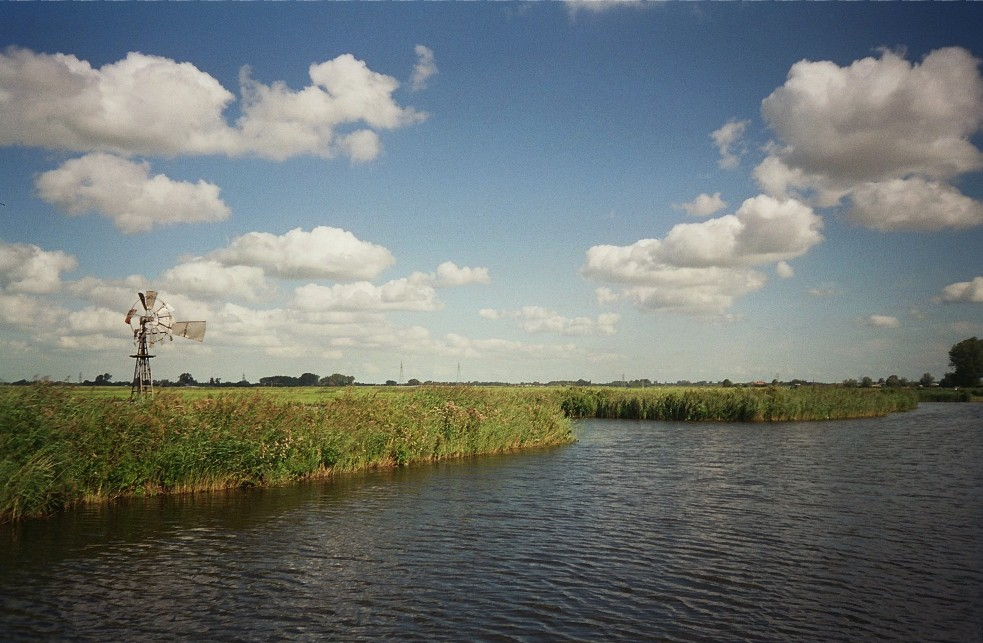
Wormer- en Jisperveld

The Wormer- en Jisperveld is a nature area, covering 18 km^{2} (of which 0.7 km^{2} are a protected area), situated between the towns De Rijp, Purmerend en Wormerveer. The area consists mainly of marshland, grassland and open water.

== Wildlife ==
The Wormer- en Jisperveld contains nationally important populations of nesting birds as the great bittern, ruff, godwit, gadwall and shoveler. The area is also important for foraging birds as for instance the spoonbill and various species of snipes and harriers. Among the wintering birds there are significant numbers of wigeons and geese.

The Wormer- en Jisperveld is also one of the last havens for the unique and rare Dutch subspecies of the tundra vole (Microtus oeconomus arenicola).

== Flora ==
The water and soil of the Wormer- en Jisperveld is brackish. Plants as the marsh fern, marshmallow, common scurvygrass and sundew can commonly be found.
