= Oostknollendam =

- Village
- Flag Coat of arms

- Location in the Netherlands Location in the province of North Holland in the Netherlands
- Coordinates: 52°31′2″N 4°47′25″E
- Country: Netherlands
- Province: North Holland
- Municipality: Wormerland

Area
  - Total: 5.93 km^{2} (2.29 sq mi)
- Elevation: −1.8 m (−5.9 ft)

Population (2021)
  - Total: 565
  - Density: 95.3/km^{2} (247/sq mi)
- Time zone: UTC+1 (CET)
  - Summer (DST): UTC+2 (CEST)
- Postal code: 1534
- Dialing code: 0222

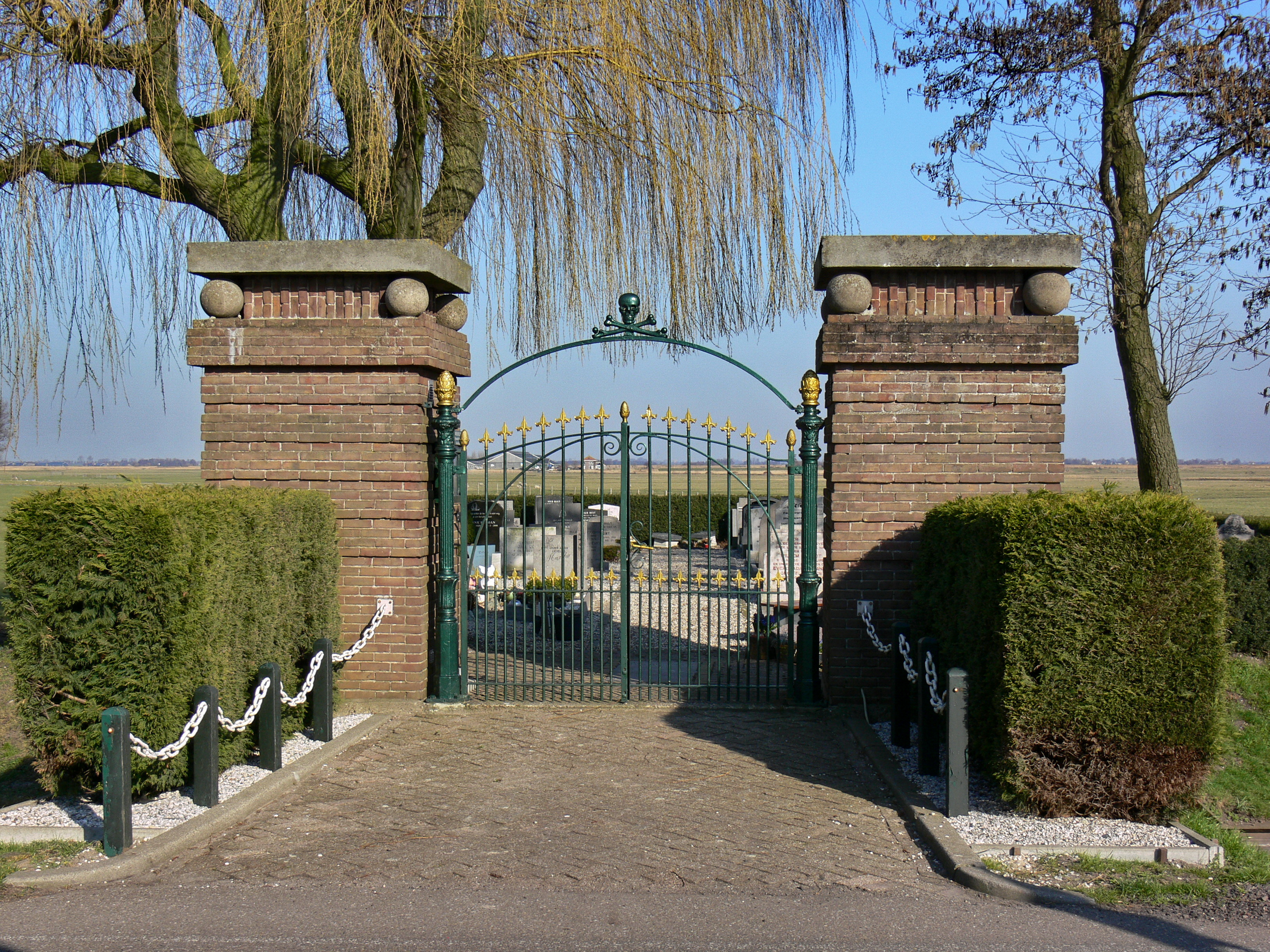
Oostknollendam

Oostknollendam is a village in the Dutch province of North Holland. It is a part of the municipality of Wormerland, and lies about 17 km north west of Amsterdam.

The village was first mentioned in 1529 as "tot Knollendam", and means "eastern end of the dam". Oost (east) has been added to distinguish from Westknollendam".

Oost-Knollendam was home to 169 people in 1840.
