= Niedorp =

- Former municipality
- Flag Coat of arms

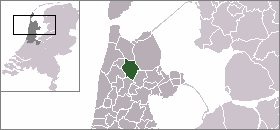
- Coordinates: 52.73°N 4.90°E
- Country: Netherlands
- Province: North Holland
- Municipality: Hollands Kroon

Area (2006)
  - Total: 62.99 km^{2} (24.32 sq mi)
  - Land: 61.58 km^{2} (23.78 sq mi)
  - Water: 1.41 km^{2} (0.54 sq mi)

Population (1 January 2007)
  - Total: 11,987
  - Density: 195/km^{2} (510/sq mi)
- Source: CBS, Statline.
- Time zone: UTC+1 (CET)
  - Summer (DST): UTC+2 (CEST)
- Website: www.niedorp.nl

Niedorp (Dutch: [ˈnidɔr(ə)p]; West Frisian: Nierup) is a former municipality in the north-western Netherlands, in the province of North Holland and the region of West-Frisia. Niedorp, along with neighbouring Barsingerhorn, received city rights in 1415, and since 2012 has been a part of the new municipality of Hollands Kroon.

== Population centres ==
The former municipality of Niedorp consisted of the following small towns and villages: Barsingerhorn, Haringhuizen, Kolhorn, Lutjewinkel, Nieuwe Niedorp, Oude Niedorp, 't Veld, Winkel, Zijdewind.

== Archaeology ==
Prehistoric settlements from the Late Neolithic period were found in De Gouw and the Groetpolder. They are covered by sediment and belong to the Single Grave Culture. In 1995, these sites were submitted to UNESCO's list of World Heritage Sites. They are currently on the tentative list.

== Local government ==
The former municipal council of Niedorp consisted of 15 seats, which at the final election in 2010 divided as follows:

- Democratie Anders (LADA) - 6 seats
- VVD - 3 seats
- PvdA - 3 seats
- CDA - 2 seats
- Algemeen Belang Niedorp - 1 seat

Elections were held in November 2011 for a council for the new merged municipality of Hollands Kroon that included Niedorp, which commenced work in January 2012.
