= Hollands Kroon =

- Municipality
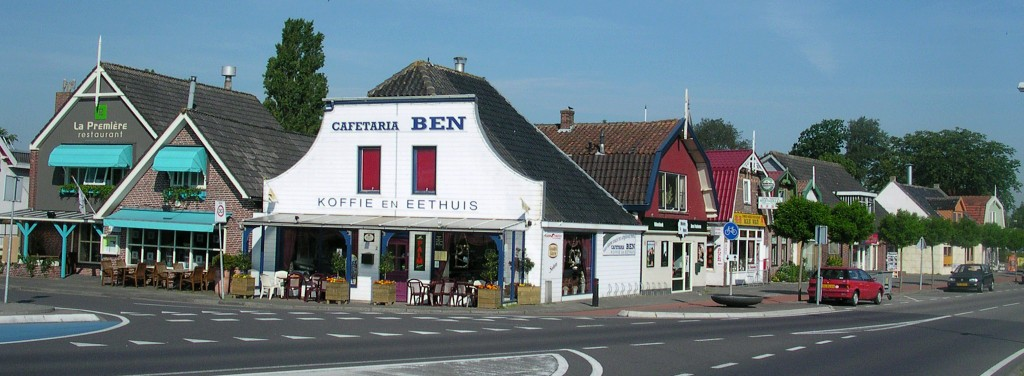
- Anna Paulowna town centre

- Flag Coat of arms

- Location in North Holland
- Coordinates: 52°52′N 4°49′E
- Country: Netherlands
- Province: North Holland
- Established: 1 January 2012

Government
  - Body: Municipal council
  - Mayor: Rian van Dam (PvdA)

Area
  - Total: 662.20 km^{2} (255.68 sq mi)
  - Land: 357.34 km^{2} (137.97 sq mi)
  - Water: 304.86 km^{2} (117.71 sq mi)
- Elevation: −1 m (−3.3 ft)

Population (January 2021)
  - Total: 48,583
  - Density: 136/km^{2} (350/sq mi)
- Time zone: UTC+1 (CET)
  - Summer (DST): UTC+2 (CEST)
- Postcode: 1730–1736, 1760–1779
- Area code: Various
- Website: www.hollandskroon.nl

Map of Hollands Kroon, June 2015

Hollands Kroon is a municipality located in the Northwest Netherlands. It was created on 1 January 2012, as a merger of four municipalities: Anna Paulowna, Niedorp, Wieringen, and Wieringermeer.

== Localities ==
Cities (places/areas with city rights):

- Barsingerhorn
- Stede Niedorp
- Wieringen
- Winkel

Villages: Anna Paulowna; Breezand; De Haukes; De Strook; Den Oever; Haringhuizen; Hippolytushoef; Kleine Sluis; Kolhorn; Kreil; Kreileroord; Lutjewinkel; Middenmeer; Moerbeek; Nieuwe Niedorp; Oosterklief; Oosterland; Oude Niedorp; Slootdorp; Smerp; Stroe; Terdiek; Tolke; Van Ewijcksluis; Vatrop; 't Veld; Verlaat; Westerklief; Westerland; Wieringerwaard; Wieringerwerf; Zijdewind	Settlements: Blokhuizen; Dam; De Belt; De Bomen; De Elft; De Gest; De Heid; De Hoelm; De Kampen; De Leijen; De Normer; De Weel; De Weere; Emaus; Gelderse Buurt; Groetpolder; Hogebieren; Hollebalg; Langereis; Lutjekolhorn; Mientbrug; Nieuwesluis; Noord-Stroe; Noordburen; Noorderbuurt; Poolland; Spoorbuurt; Tin; Vennik; Wateringskant; Westeinde; Zandburen

== Local government ==
The municipal council of Hollands Kroon consists of 29 seats, which are divided as follows:

Municipal council seats
Party	2018	2022	2026
Onafhankelijk Hollands Kroon	3	8	5
Forum voor Democratie			5
CDA	5	5	5
VVD	5	4	3
Senioren Hollands Kroon	7	4	2
GroenLinks	2	2	2
Lokaal Democratisch Alternatief			2
D66	2	2	2
PvdA	2	2	2
LEV!Hollandskroon			1
Christian Union	1		
LADA (Democratie Anders)	1		
ANDERS!	1		
LADA & ANDERS!		2	
Total	29	29	29

The executive board consists of Onafhankelijk Hollands Kroon, CDA, PRO (GroenLinks–PvdA) and Senioren Hollands Kroon.

== Notable people ==
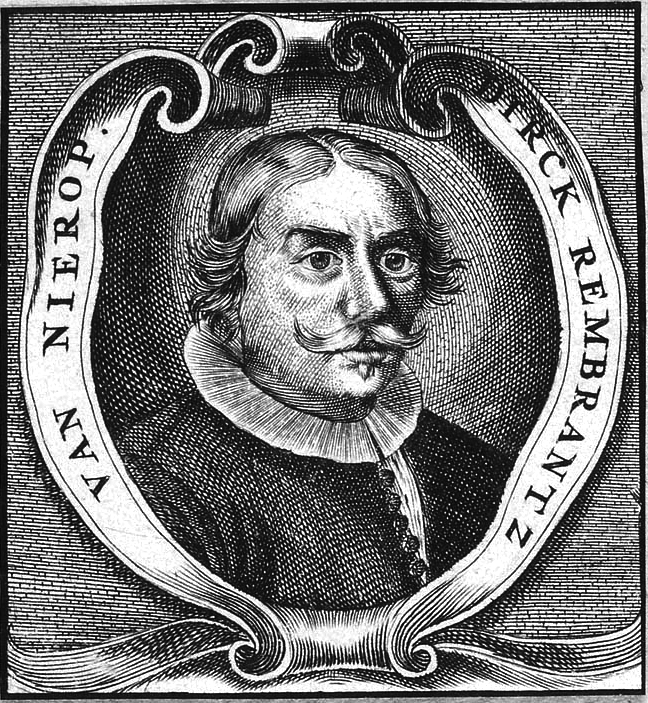
Dirk Rembrantz van Nierop

- Dirck Pietersz van Nierop (1540 in Nieuwe Niedorp – 1610) a Mennonite minister
- Dirck Rembrantsz van Nierop (1610 in Nieuwe Niedorp – 1682) cartographer, mathematician, surveyor, astronomer and teacher
- Elisabeth van der Woude (1657 in Nieuwe Niedorp – 1698) a Dutch traveller and author
- Hendrik van Borssum Buisman (1873 in Wieringen – 1951) painter
- Pieter Baas (1944 in Wieringermeer – 2024) a botanist
- Gerbrand Bakker (born 1962 in Wieringerwaard) a writer

=== Sport ===
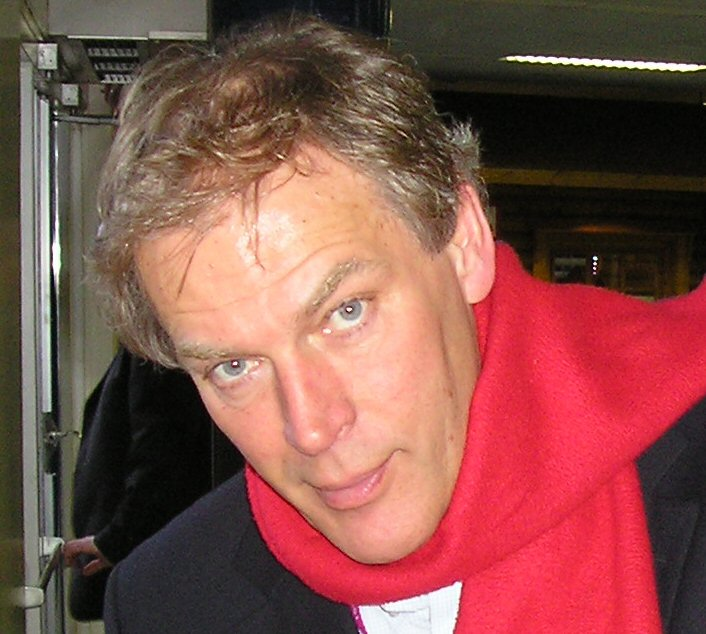
Ard Schenk, 2006

- Albertus Perk (1887 in Anna Paulowna – 1919) a Dutch fencer, competed in the individual épée event at the 1912 Summer Olympics
- Ard Schenk (born 1944 in Anna Paulowna) a former speed skater, silver medallist at the 1968 Winter Olympics and triple gold medallist at the 1972 Winter Olympics
- Henk Schenk (born 1945 in Wieringerwaard) an American former wrestler, competed in the 1968 and 1972 Summer Olympics
- Erik Heijblok (born 1977 in Den Oever, Wieringen) retired football goalkeeper.
- Selma Borst (born 1983 in Wieringerwaard) a runner
- Kai Reus (born 1985 in Niedorp) a former professional road bicycle racer
- Jessy Kramer (born 1990 in Zijdewind) a handball player
- Marit Raaijmakers (born 1999 in Hippolytushoef) a racing cyclist

== Gallery ==
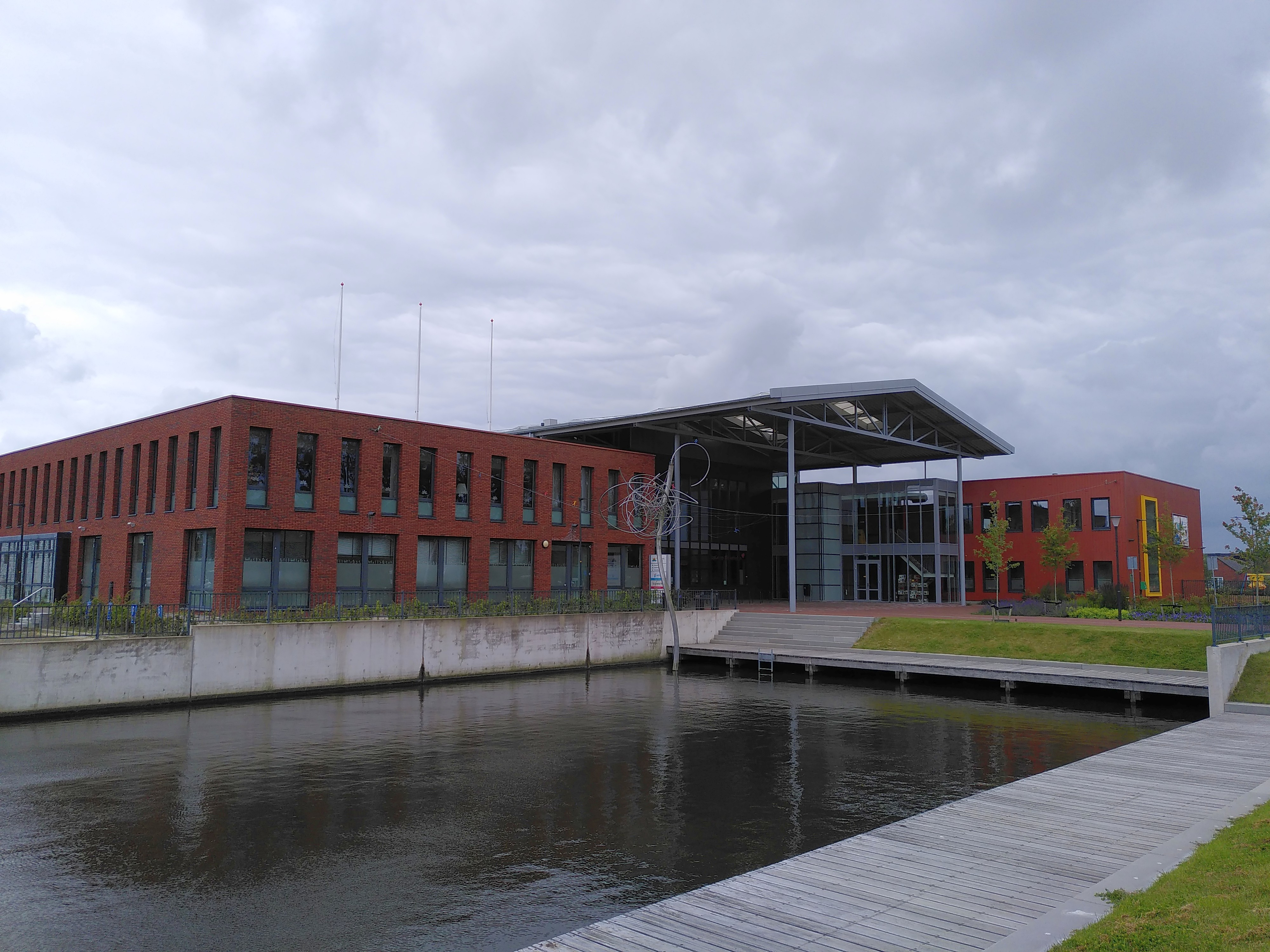
The town hall of Hollands Kroon, in Anna Paulowna.

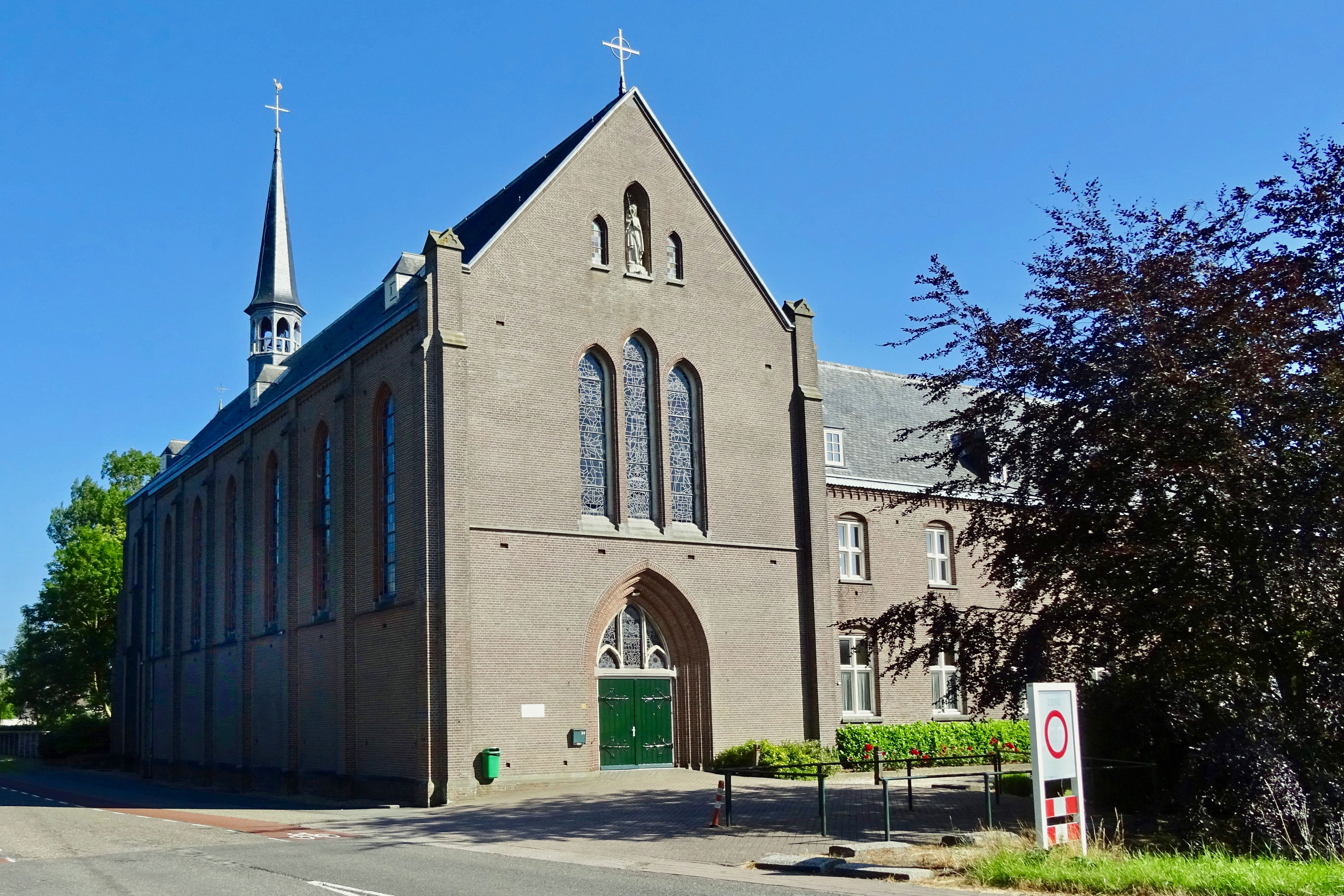
Monastery with church, Nieuwe Niedorp

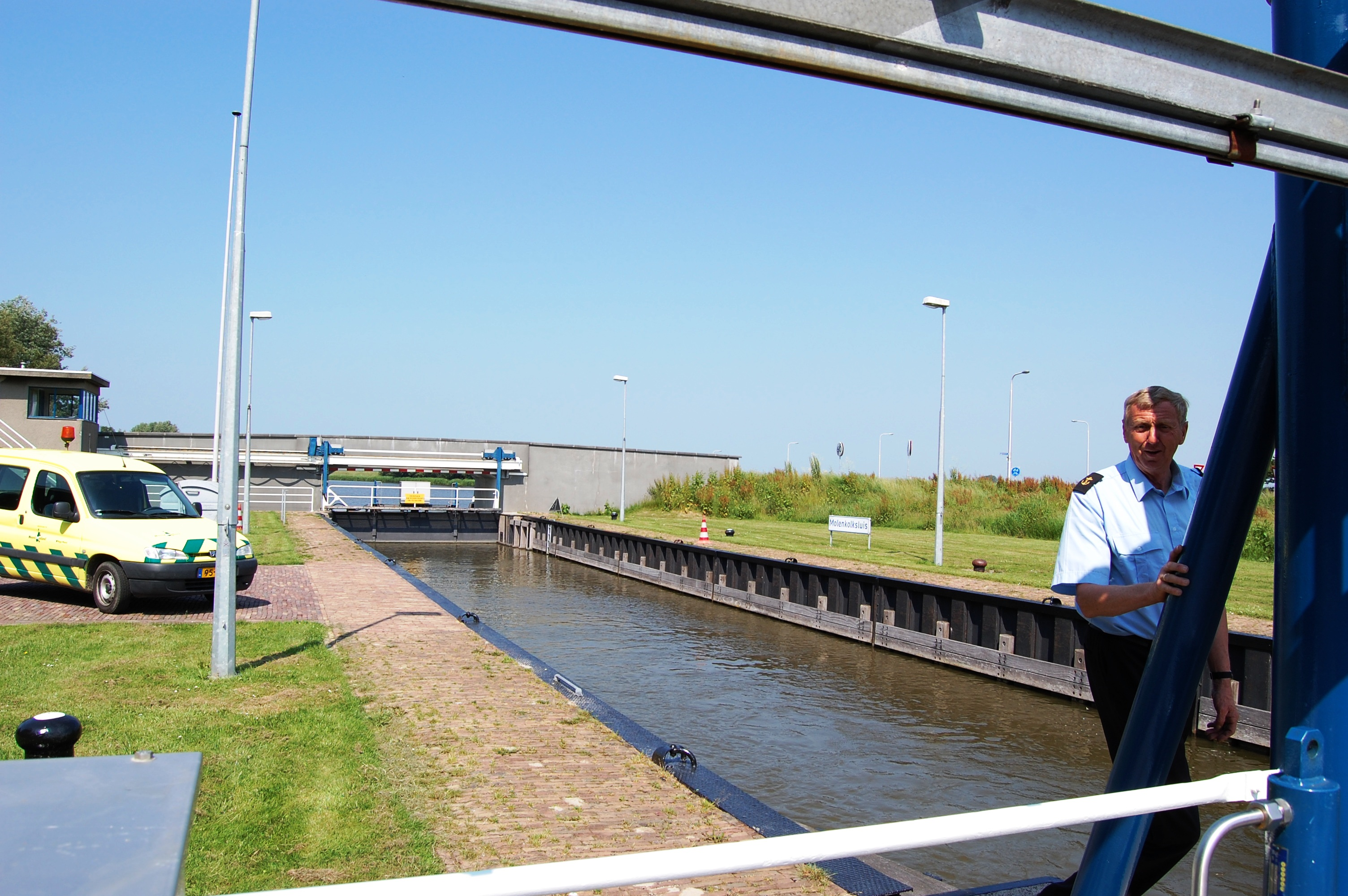
Molenkolksluis

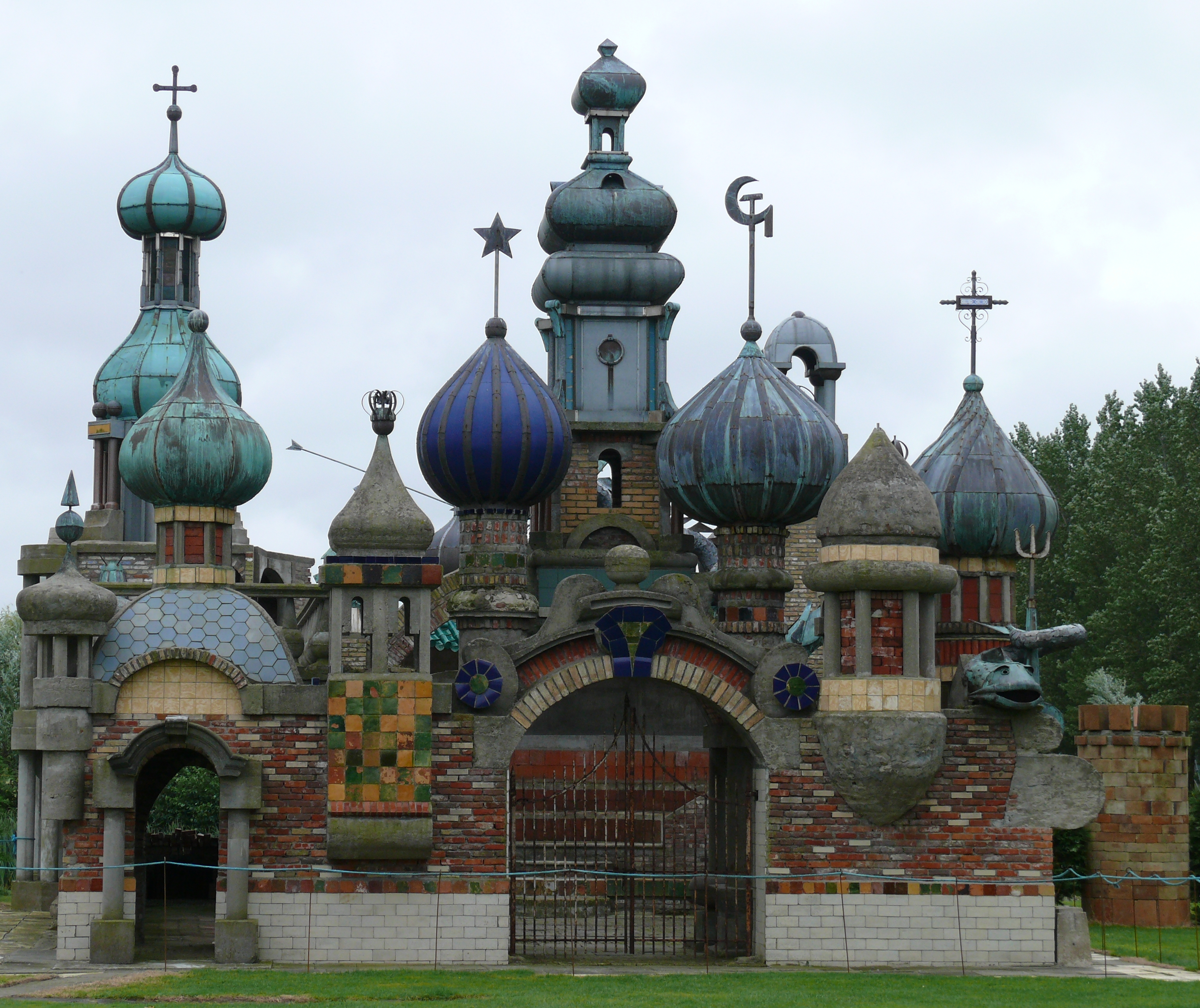
Nederlands Kremlin in Winkel

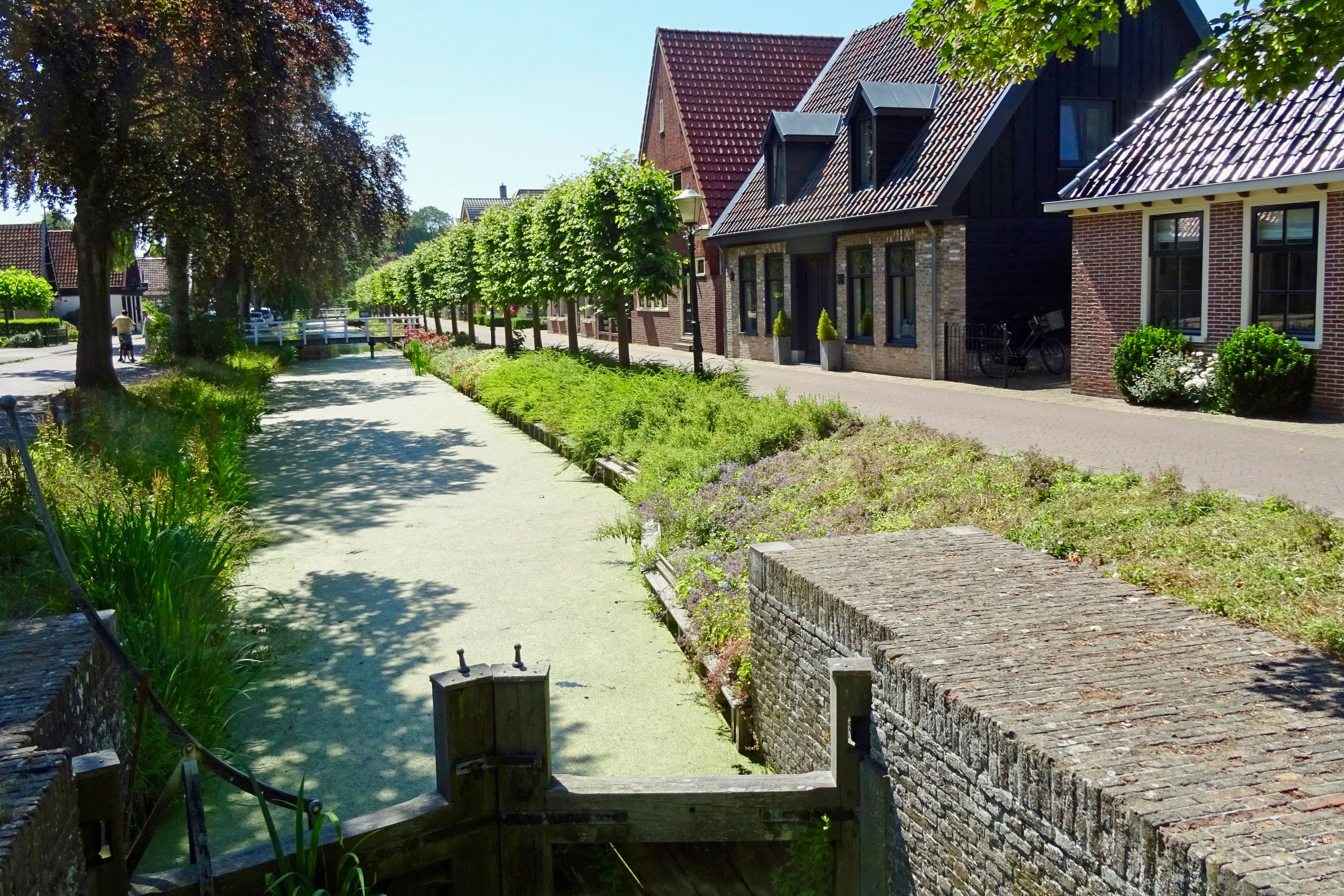
Schutsluisje, Nieuwe Niedorp
