= Anna Paulowna =

- Town
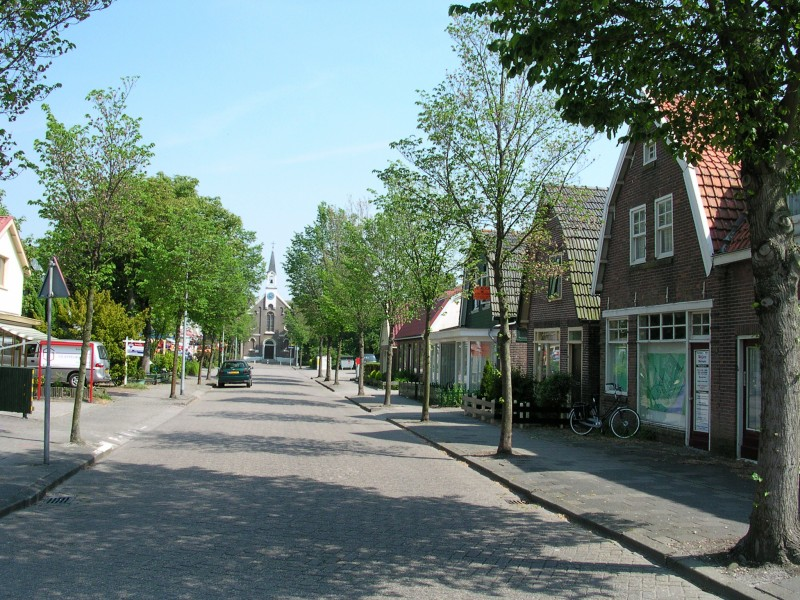
- Church and the historical centre of Anna Paulowna.

- Flag Coat of arms

- Location in the Netherlands Location in the province of North Holland in the Netherlands
- Coordinates: 52.87°N 4.87°E
- Country: Netherlands
- Province: North Holland
- Municipality: Hollands Kroon

Area
  - Total: 35.06 km^{2} (13.54 sq mi)
- Elevation: −0.3 m (−0.98 ft)

Population (2025)
  - Total: 8,795
  - Density: 250.9/km^{2} (649.7/sq mi)
- Time zone: UTC+1 (CET)
  - Summer (DST): UTC+2 (CEST)
- Postal code: 1761
- Dialing code: 0223

Anna Paulowna (Dutch pronunciation: [ˈɑnaː pɑˈloːnaː]) is a former municipality and a town in the Netherlands, in the province of North Holland. The name is derived from the Anna Paulownapolder, which was laid dry in 1846 during the reign of King William II of the Netherlands and named after his wife, Queen Anna Paulowna of Russia. Since 2012, Anna Paulowna has been a part of the new municipality of Hollands Kroon.

== Population centres ==
The former municipality of Anna Paulowna consisted of the following small towns and villages: Anna Paulowna, Breezand, Nieuwesluis, Van Ewijcksluis and Wieringerwaard.

== Transportation ==
The town is served by the Dutch Railways NS at Anna Paulowna railway station.

== Notable people ==
Joey Alders (born 1999), racing driver.

== Local government ==
The former municipal council of Anna Paulowna consisted of 15 seats. After the 2010 election the seats were divided as follows:

- VVD - 5 seats
- CDA - 5 seats
- PvdA - 4 seats
- Lijst F.A. Leal - 1 seat

Elections were held in November 2011 for a council for the new merged Hollands Kroon municipality that commenced work in January 2012, replacing Anna Paulowna council.

== See also ==
- Zeeuws spek
