= Blokhuizen =

- Location within Netherlands
- Coordinates: 52°45′7″N 4°49′54″E
- Country: Netherlands
- Province: North Holland
- Municipality: Hollands Kroon

Blokhuizen is a hamlet located in the municipality of Hollands Kroon in the Dutch province of North Holland.

Blokhuizen is located just north of Zijdewind, formally it also falls under that place. The name already appeared in an exploit from 1660 as "Blockhuysen." It was on a number of cards, including those from North Holland by Joost Janszoon Bilhamer from 1575, the name "Blockhuysen" was also mentioned. The name may have been derived from the fact that the nucleus is approximately at the place where once two blockhouses were once located. A log cabin is a defense post erected from small trunks and large, heavy beams, usually located on a connecting road.

Until 1 January 2012, Blokhuizen was part of the municipality Niedorp that merged into a municipal reorganization with three other municipalities to become Hollands Kroon on that date.
