= De Haukes =

- Hamlet
- Location in the Netherlands Location in the province of North Holland in the Netherlands
- Coordinates: 52°53′N 4°56′E
- Country: Netherlands
- Province: North Holland
- Municipality: Hollands Kroon

Area
  - Total: 0.14 km^{2} (0.054 sq mi)

Population (2025)
  - Total: 135
  - Density: 960/km^{2} (2,500/sq mi)
- Time zone: UTC+1 (CET)
  - Summer (DST): UTC+2 (CEST)
- Postal code: 1778
- Dialing code: 0227

De Haukes is a hamlet in the Dutch province of North Holland. It is a part of the municipality of Hollands Kroon, and lies about 14 km southeast of Den Helder. De Haukes is located on the west end of the former island. The harbour of Wieringen used to be here, until the island was connected to the mainland by the Amsteldiepdijk.

The hamlet is considered part of Westerland. It has place name signs. In 1840, it was home to 20 people.
