= Oosterland =

Oosterland refers to two villages in the Netherlands:

- Oosterland, Zeeland
- Oosterland, North Holland
