= Schagen FM =

Schagen FM is the local public broadcasting company for the municipality of Schagen and the former municipality of Niedorp.
