= Moerbeek =

- Hamlet
- Location in the Netherlands Location in the province of North Holland in the Netherlands
- Coordinates: 52°45′47″N 4°51′10″E
- Country: Netherlands
- Province: North Holland
- Municipality: Hollands Kroon
- Time zone: UTC+1 (CET)
  - Summer (DST): UTC+2 (CEST)
- Postal code: 1732
- Dialing code: 0224

Moerbeek is a hamlet in the Dutch province of North Holland. It is a part of the municipality of Hollands Kroon, and lies about 11 km north of Heerhugowaard.

Moerbeek is not a statistical entity, and the postal authorities have placed it under Lutjewinkel. Moerbeek has place name signs. It was home to 90 people in 1840. Nowadays, it consists of about 60 houses.
