= Wateringskant =

- Hamlet
- Location in the Netherlands Location in the province of North Holland in the Netherlands
- Coordinates: 52°45′40″N 4°52′25″E
- Country: Netherlands
- Province: North Holland
- Municipality: Hollands Kroon
- Time zone: UTC+1 (CET)
  - Summer (DST): UTC+2 (CEST)
- Postal code: 1732
- Dialing code: 0224

Wateringskant is a hamlet in the Dutch province of North Holland. It is a part of the municipality of Hollands Kroon, and lies about 10 km north of Heerhugowaard.

Wateringskant is not a statistical entity, and the postal authorities have placed it under Lutjewinkel. It has no place name signs, and consists of about 10 houses.
