= Vatrop =

- Hamlet
- Location in the Netherlands Location in the province of North Holland in the Netherlands
- Coordinates: 52°56′N 5°0′E
- Country: Netherlands
- Province: North Holland
- Municipality: Hollands Kroon
- Time zone: UTC+1 (CET)
  - Summer (DST): UTC+2 (CEST)
- Postal code: 1779
- Dialing code: 0227

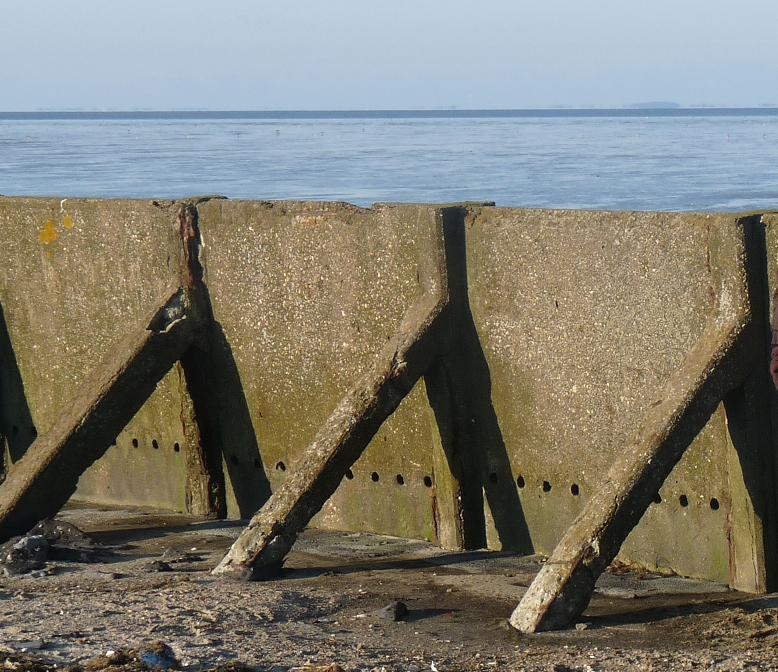
An old storm barrier in Vatrop

Vatrop is a hamlet in the Dutch province of North Holland. It is a part of the municipality of Hollands Kroon, and lies about 17 km southeast of Den Helder.

Vatrop is not a statistical entity, and the postal authorities have placed it under Den Oever. It has no place name signs, and consists of about 10 houses.
