= Langereis =

- Hamlet
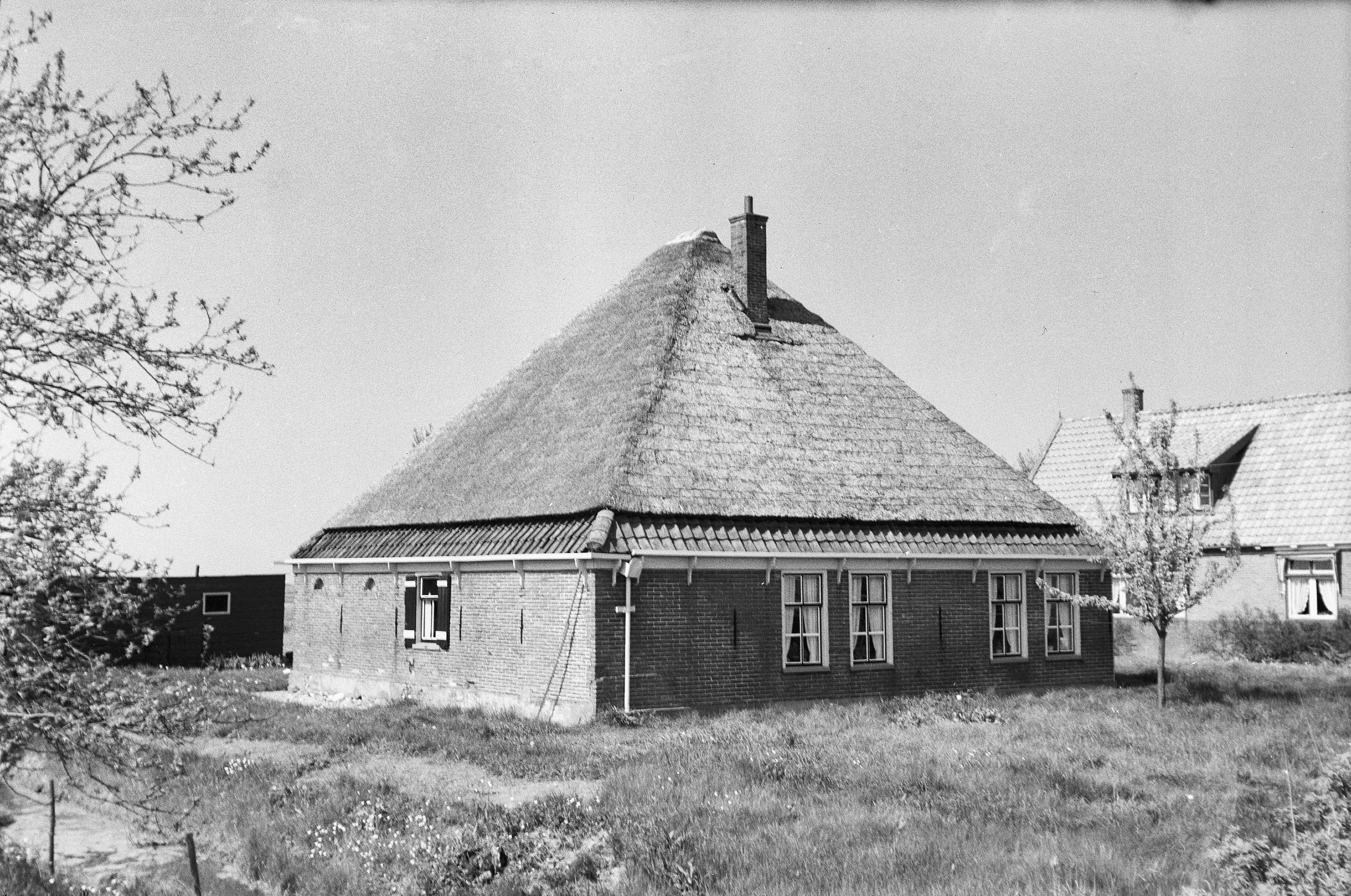
- Farm in Langereis

- Location in the Netherlands Location in the province of North Holland in the Netherlands
- Coordinates: 52°42′40″N 4°54′13″E
- Country: Netherlands
- Province: North Holland
- Municipality: Hollands Kroon; Opmeer

Area
  - Total: 3.99 km^{2} (1.54 sq mi)

Population (2025)
  - Total: 115
  - Density: 28.8/km^{2} (74.6/sq mi)
- Time zone: UTC+1 (CET)
  - Summer (DST): UTC+2 (CEST)
- Postal code: 1718
- Dialing code: 0226

Langereis is a hamlet in the Dutch province of North Holland. It is located in the municipalities of Hollands Kroon and Opmeer, and lies about 7 km northeast of Heerhugowaard.

Langereis has no place name signs. It was home to 235 people in 1840.
