= Amsteldiepdijk =

Dike in North Holland

Coordinates: 52°53′23″N 4°53′25″E

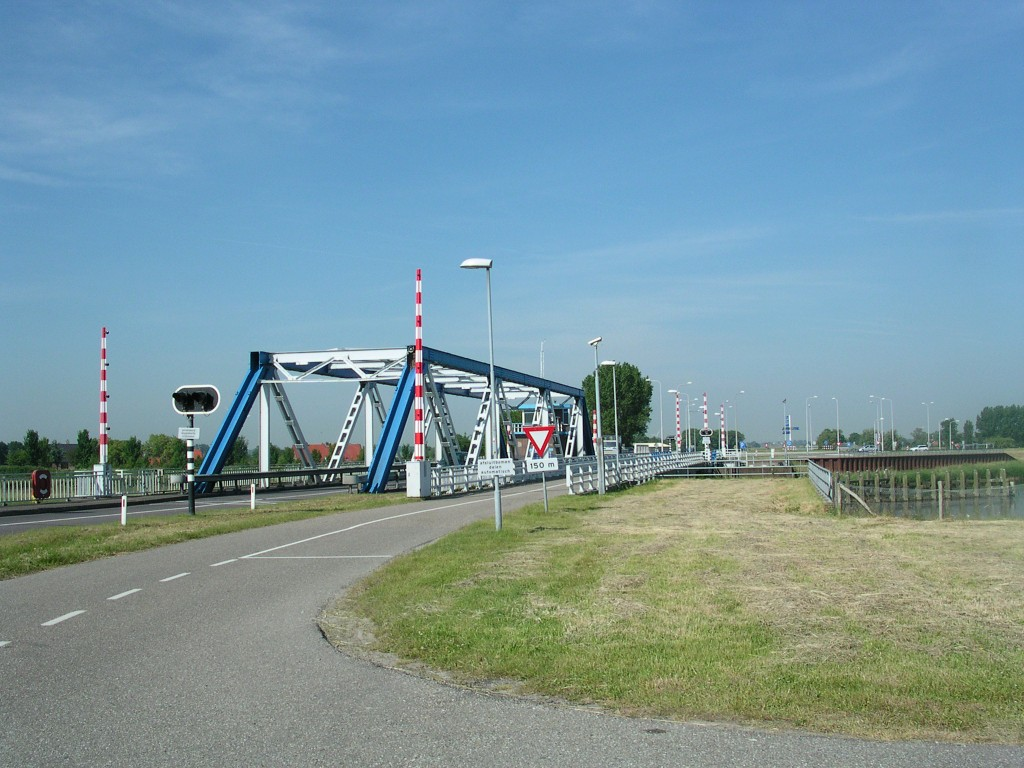

Amsteldiepdijk is a dike between Van Ewijcksluis and the island of Wieringen. It was built in 1924 and closes a portion of the Amsteldiep and of the Ulkediep.

It is often considered to be the first work of engineering of the Zuiderzee works. With the small dike, the former island (1200 to 1932) of Wieringen is connected on the western side with the mainland of North Holland and is no longer an island.

The dam serves as a prototype in some way to works to come on the future IJsselmeer. Some errors served as lessons. A collapse is still visible on the side of the lake Amstelmeer. The government decided that it was the fault of the contractor, and ultimately he had to pay damages to the state. Prime contractors joined forces in a consortium, the Society for the implementation of work of the Zuiderzee.

This small dike is important as the first time that boulder clay was used in the construction of dam. It remained to build the large dam in the south to close the polder Wieringermeer.
