= Selma Borst =

Dutch runner

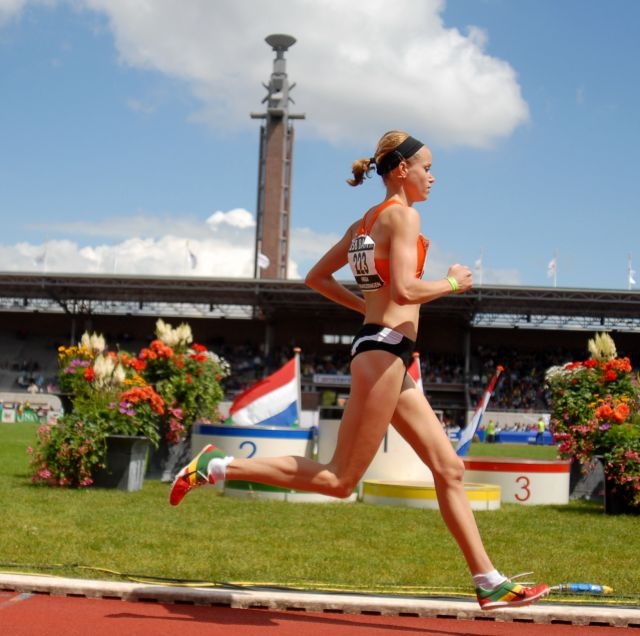
- Selma Borst on her way to becoming Dutch 5000m champion in 2007

Personal information
- Full name: Selma Borst
- Nickname: -
- Born: 6 September 1983 (age 42) Wieringerwaard, Netherlands
- Years active: 1996-present
- Height: 1.70 m (5 ft 7 in)
- Weight: 55 kg (121 lb)

Achievements and titles
- Personal best(s): 1500 metres – 4:19.84 (2007); 3000 metres – 9:14.95 (2005); 5000 metres – 15:49.90 (2004); 10000 metres – 32:41.12 (2006); 10 km – 33:26 (2004); 10 miles – 56:19.00 (2004) half marathon – 1:11.23 (2005)
- Updated on 28 March 2008

Selma Borst (born 6 September 1983 in Wieringerwaard) is a Dutch runner.

== Career highlights ==
European Championships
2007 - Vaasa, 3rd, European Cup for countries, 5,000 m

Dutch National Championships
2002 - Assen, 3rd, 1,500 m (juniors)
2004 - Utrecht, 3rd, 5,000 m
2005 - Schoorl, 2nd, 10,000 m road
2005 - The Hague, 1st, Half marathon
2005 - Drunen, 2nd, 10,000 m track
2006 - Schoorl, 3rd, 10,000 m road
2006 - Norg, 3rd, long cross
2006 - The Hague, 1st, Half marathon
2007 - Amsterdam, 1st, 5,000 m
2007 - The Hague, 3rd, Half marathon
2007 - Schoorl, 2nd, 10,000 m road
2007 - Wageningen, 2nd, long cross

== Personal bests ==
Distance	Mark	Date	Location
800 m	2:16.93	June 2, 2002	Hengelo
1,000 m	3:03.65		
1,500 m	4:19.84	June 2, 2007	Neerpelt
3,000 m	9:14.95	May 16, 2005	Vught
5,000 m	15:49.90	July 31, 2004	Heusden
10,000 m track	32:41.12	August 7, 2006	Gothenburg
10,000 m road	33:26.00	August 29, 2004	Zevenaar
10 Eng.Miles	56:19.00	September 19, 2004	Zaandam
Half marathon	1:11.23	March 19, 2005	The Hague
