= Nieuwesluis, North Holland =

Nieuwesluis
- Hamlet
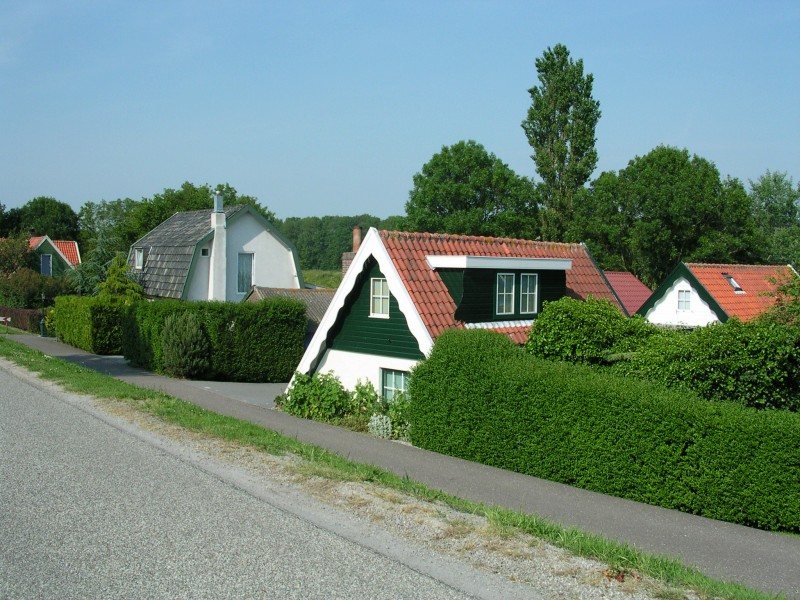

- Location in the Netherlands Location in the province of North Holland in the Netherlands
- Coordinates: 52°50′8″N 4°53′27″E
- Country: Netherlands
- Province: North Holland
- Municipality: Hollands Kroon

Area
  - Total: 0.10 km^{2} (0.039 sq mi)

Population (2025)
  - Total: 100
  - Density: 1,000/km^{2} (2,600/sq mi)
- Time zone: UTC+1 (CET)
  - Summer (DST): UTC+2 (CEST)
- Postal code: 1766
- Dialing code: 0224

Nieuwesluis is a hamlet in the Dutch province of North Holland. It is a part of the municipality of Hollands Kroon, and lies about 15 kilometres (9.3 mi) southeast of Den Helder.

Nieuwesluis is considered part of Wieringerwaard. It has place name signs.
