= Terdiek =

- Hamlet
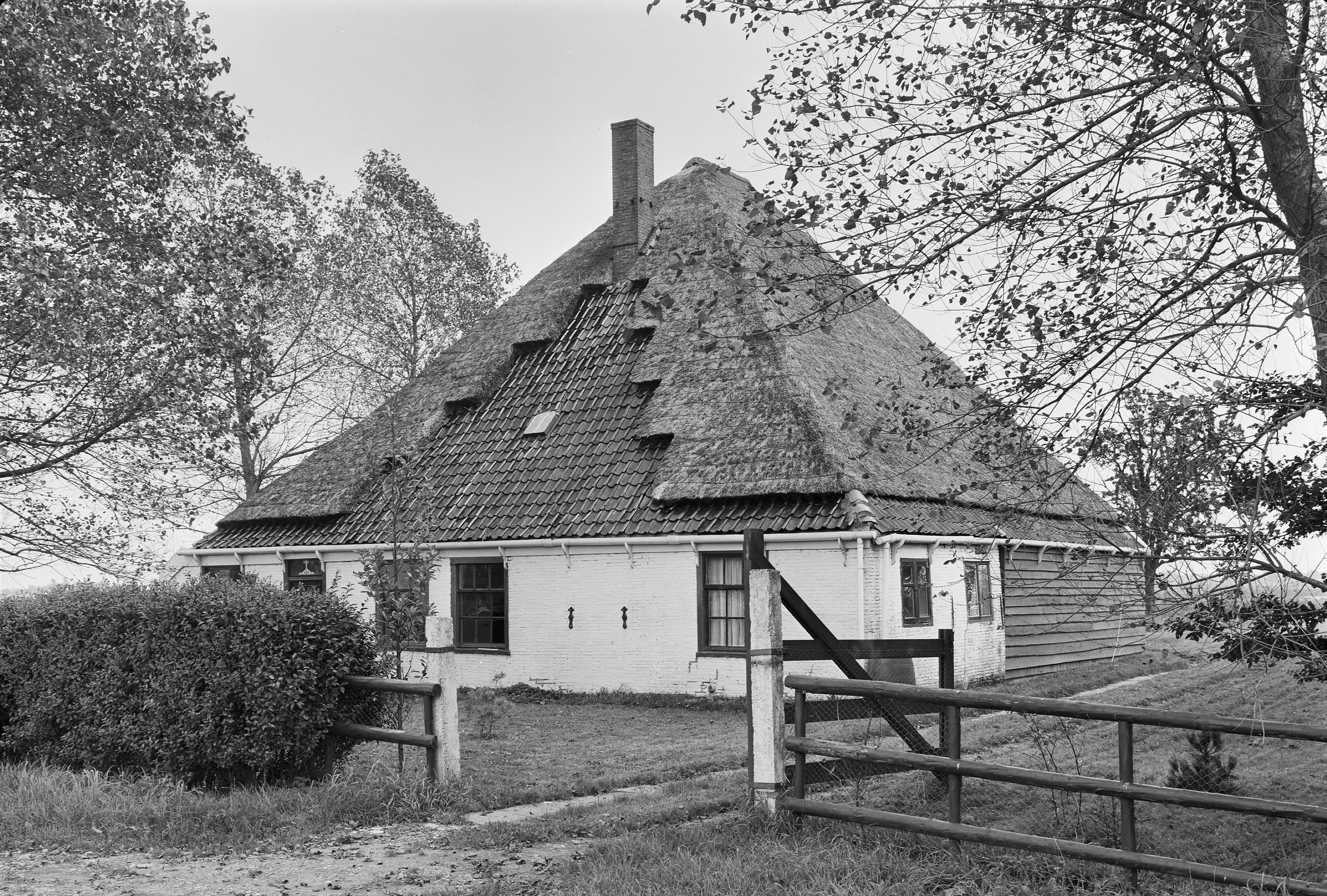
- Farm in Terdiek

- Location in the Netherlands Location in the province of North Holland in the Netherlands
- Coordinates: 52°43′37″N 4°53′49″E
- Country: Netherlands
- Province: North Holland
- Municipality: Hollands Kroon
- Time zone: UTC+1 (CET)
  - Summer (DST): UTC+2 (CEST)
- Postal code: 1733
- Dialing code: 0226

Terdiek is a hamlet in the Dutch province of North Holland. It is a part of the municipality of Hollands Kroon, and lies about 7 km northeast of Heerhugowaard.

Terdiek is not a statistical entity, and the postal authorities have placed it under Nieuwe Niedorp. Since 2017, it has place name signs. Terdiek was home to 42 people in 1840. Nowadays, it consists of about 40 houses.
