= Henk Schenk =

American wrestler (born 1945)

Hendrik "Henk" Schenk (born 29 April 1945) is an American former wrestler who competed in the 1968 Summer Olympics and in the 1972 Summer Olympics. He was born in the Wieringerwaard, Netherlands. He competed collegiately at Oregon State University, and was inducted into their Athletic Hall of Fame in 1992.

Schenk is a cousin of the speed skater Ard Schenk, who won one silver and three gold medals at the 1968 and 1972 Winter Olympics.
