= Kolhorn =

- Village
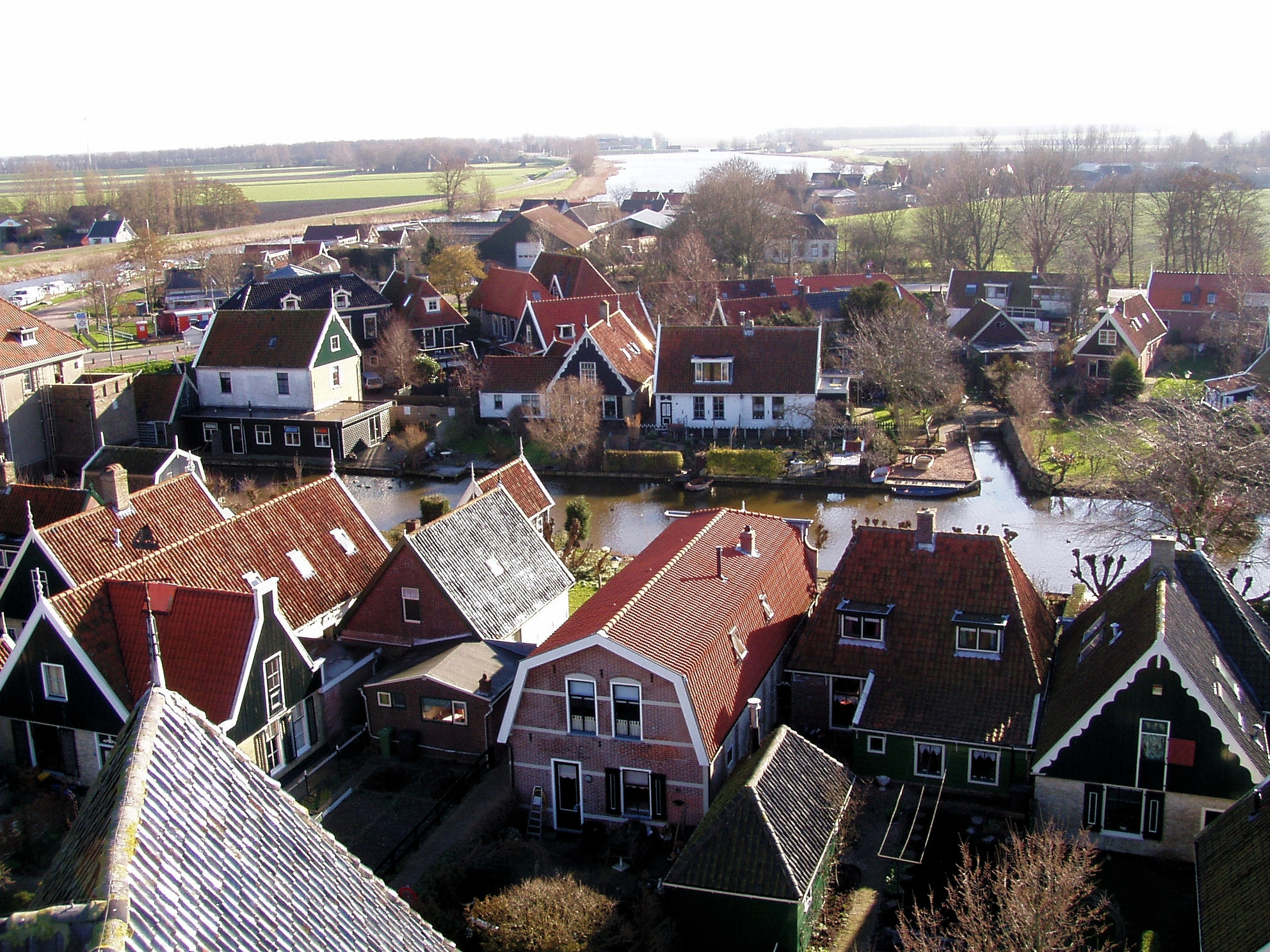

- Location in the Netherlands Location in the province of North Holland in the Netherlands
- Coordinates: 52°47′34″N 4°53′20″E
- Country: Netherlands
- Province: North Holland
- Municipality: Hollands Kroon

Area
  - Village: 3.57 km^{2} (1.38 sq mi)
- Elevation: −0.9 m (−3.0 ft)

Population (2025)
  - Village: 1,080
  - Density: 303/km^{2} (784/sq mi)
  - Urban: 1,000
  - Rural: 80
- Time zone: UTC+1 (CET)
  - Summer (DST): UTC+2 (CEST)
- Postal code: 1767
- Dialing code: 0224

Kolhorn (West Frisian: Klòrre(n)) is a village in the Dutch province of North Holland. It is a part of the municipality of Hollands Kroon, and lies about 8 kilometres (5.0 mi) east of Schagen.

== History ==
The village was first mentioned in 1518 as Kolhoiren, and may mean "cold corner". Kolhorn is a dike village which developed in the 14th century on a sharp corner of the sea dike. During the 18th century, the economy was based on fishing and peat transport. The village was destroyed by fire in 1788.

The Dutch Reformed is a single aisled church with a lean tower. It was originally from the 15th century, but burnt down in 1788. It was restored between 1791 and 1792. The pub De Roode Leeuw dates from 1620, but received its current shape in the 19th century.

Kolhorn was home to 551 people in 1840. After the poldering, the village is now situated land inwards, but has retained the appearance of a fishing village.

== Notable people ==
- Jacob Kistemaker was born on Kolhorn

== Gallery ==
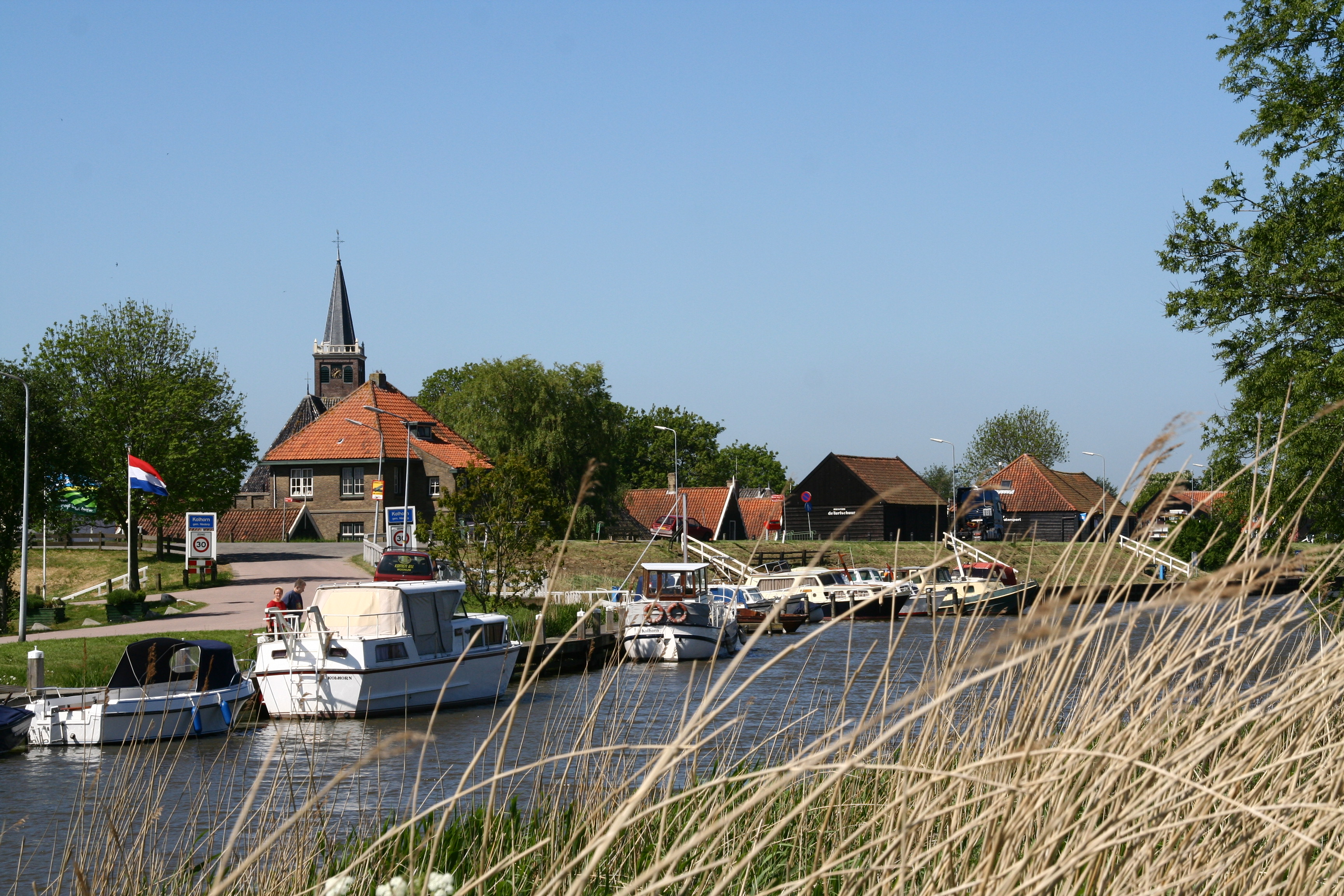
View of Kolhorn from Westfriese dike.

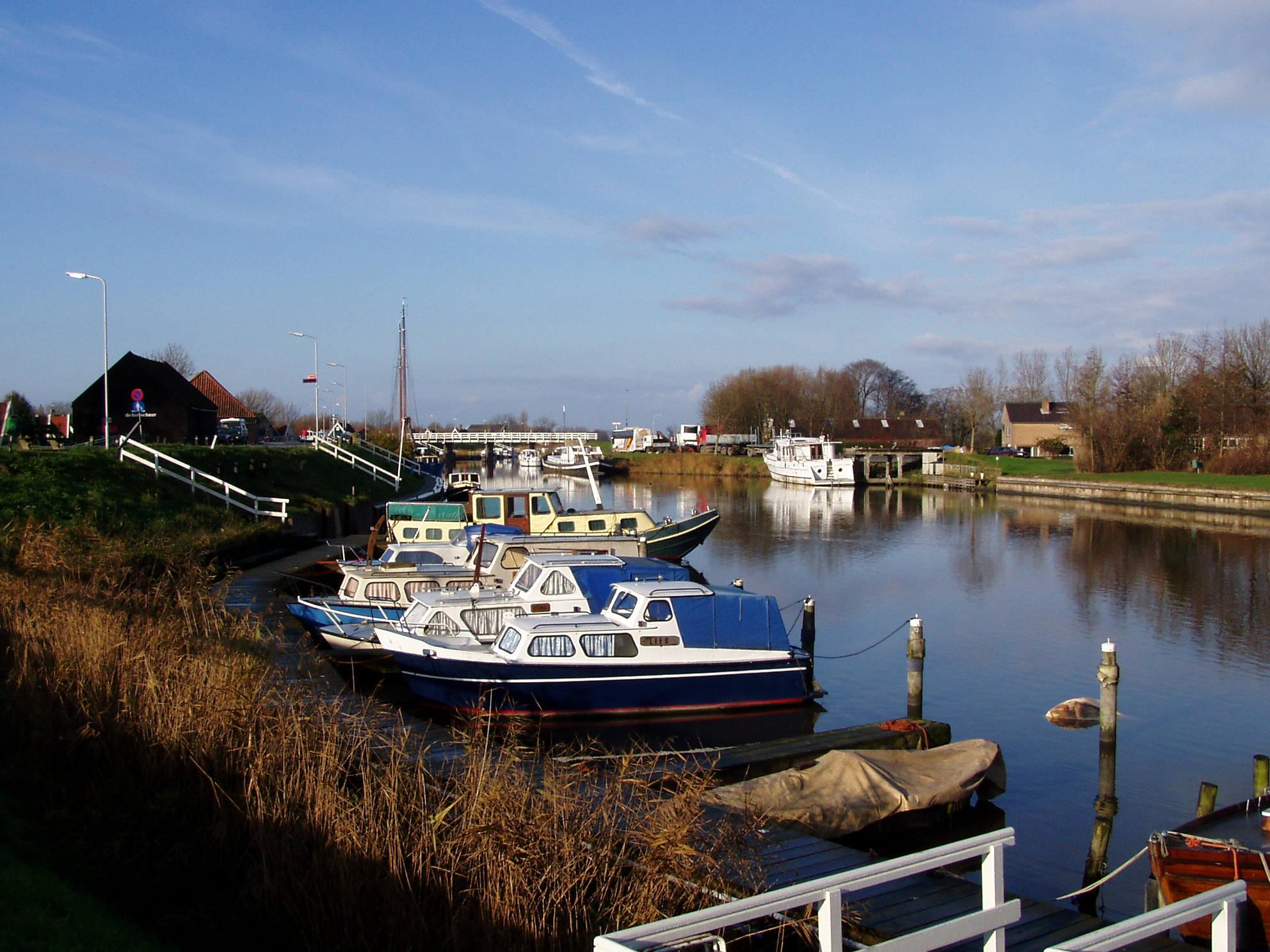
Marina of Kolhorn

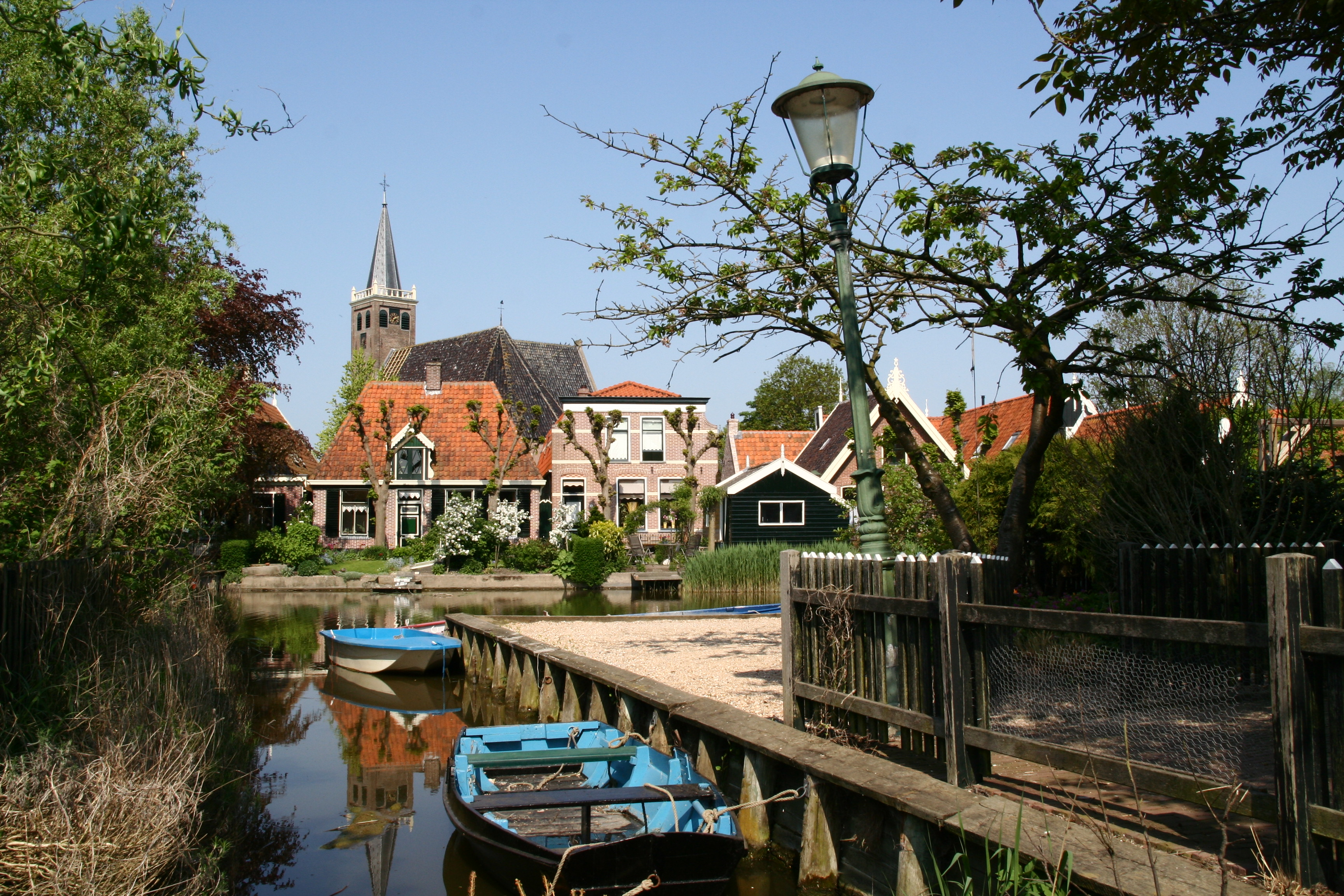
Inner harbour

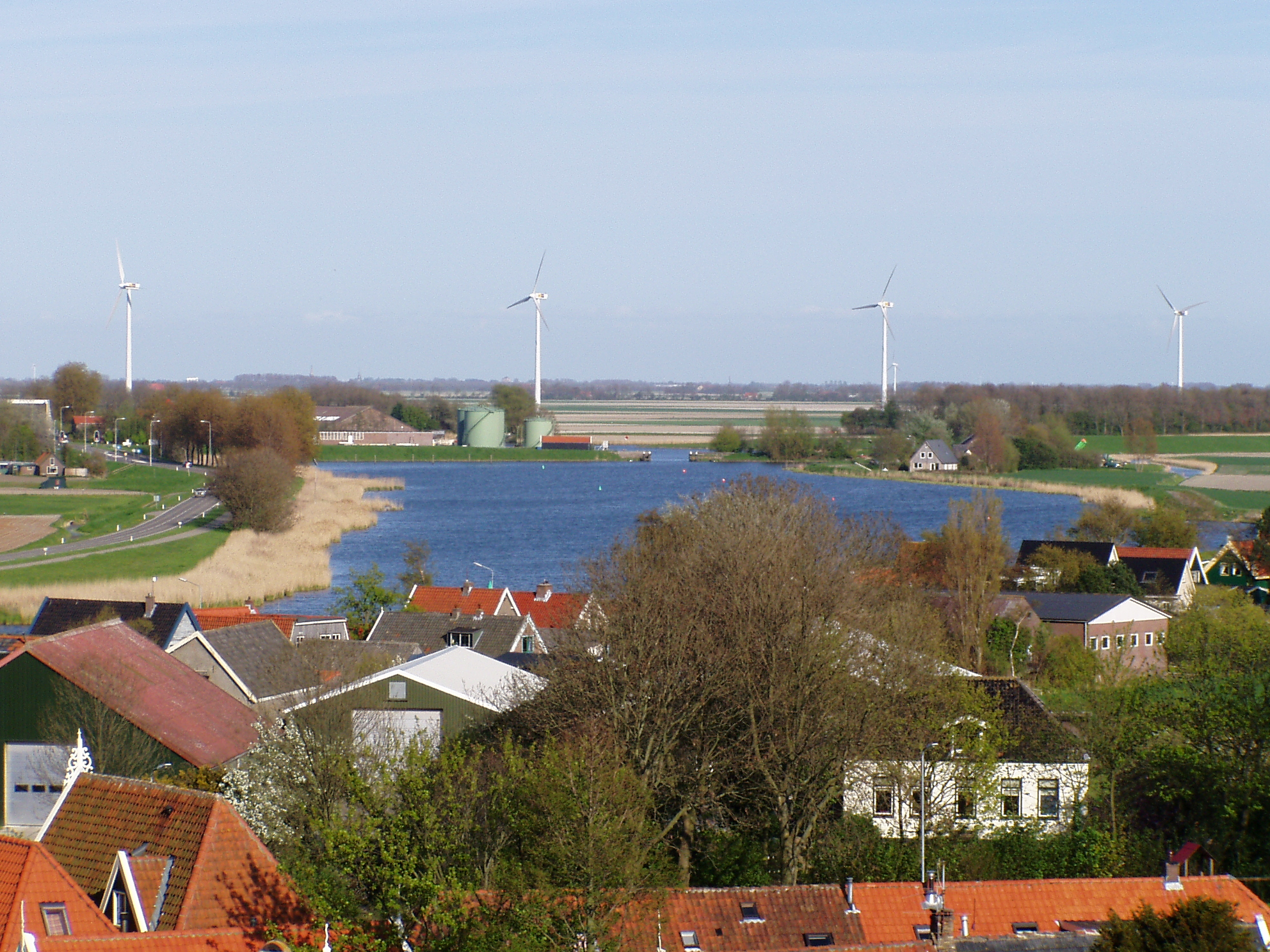
Kolhornerdiep, east of Kolhorn.

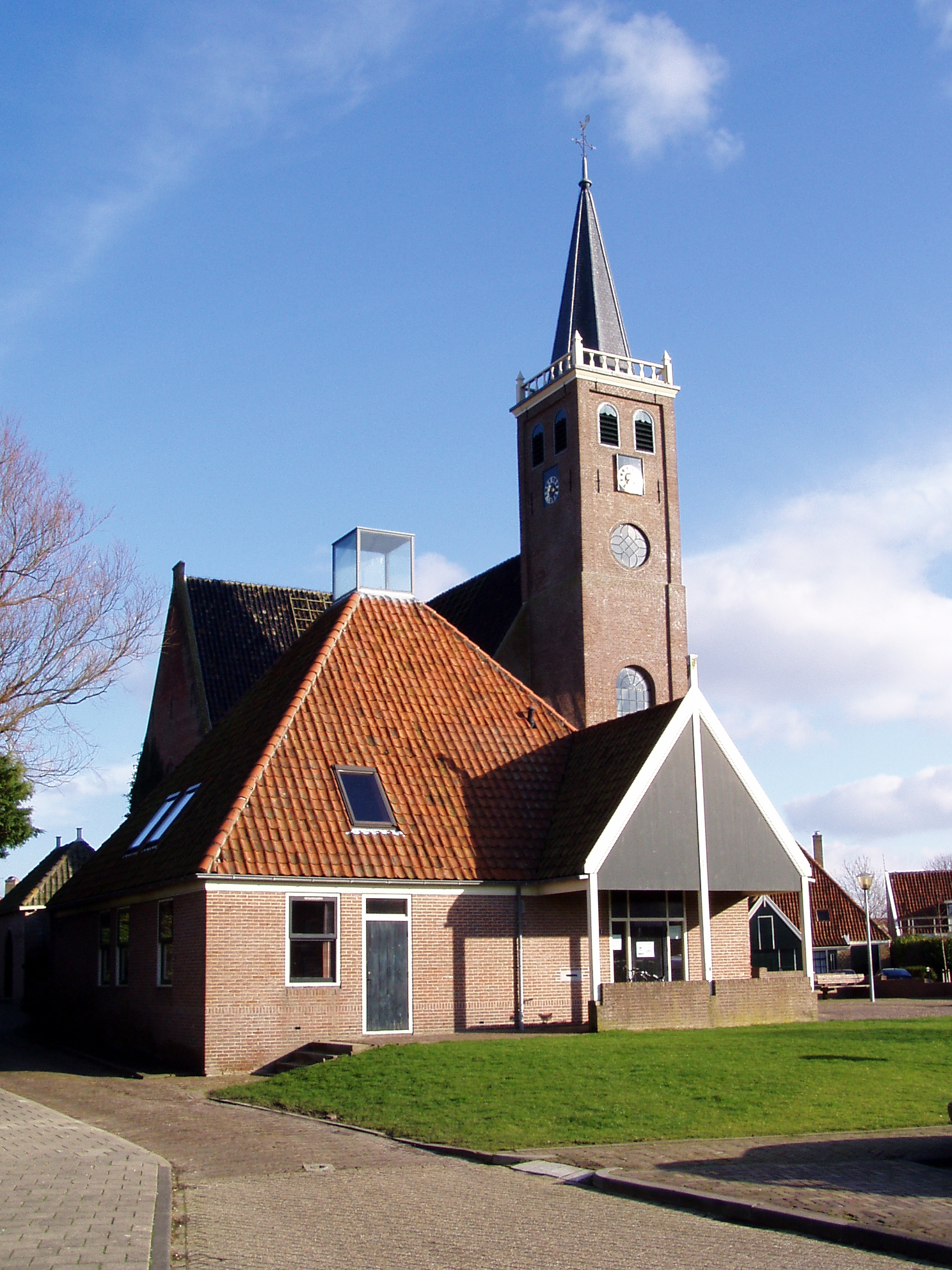
Laurens church of 1645

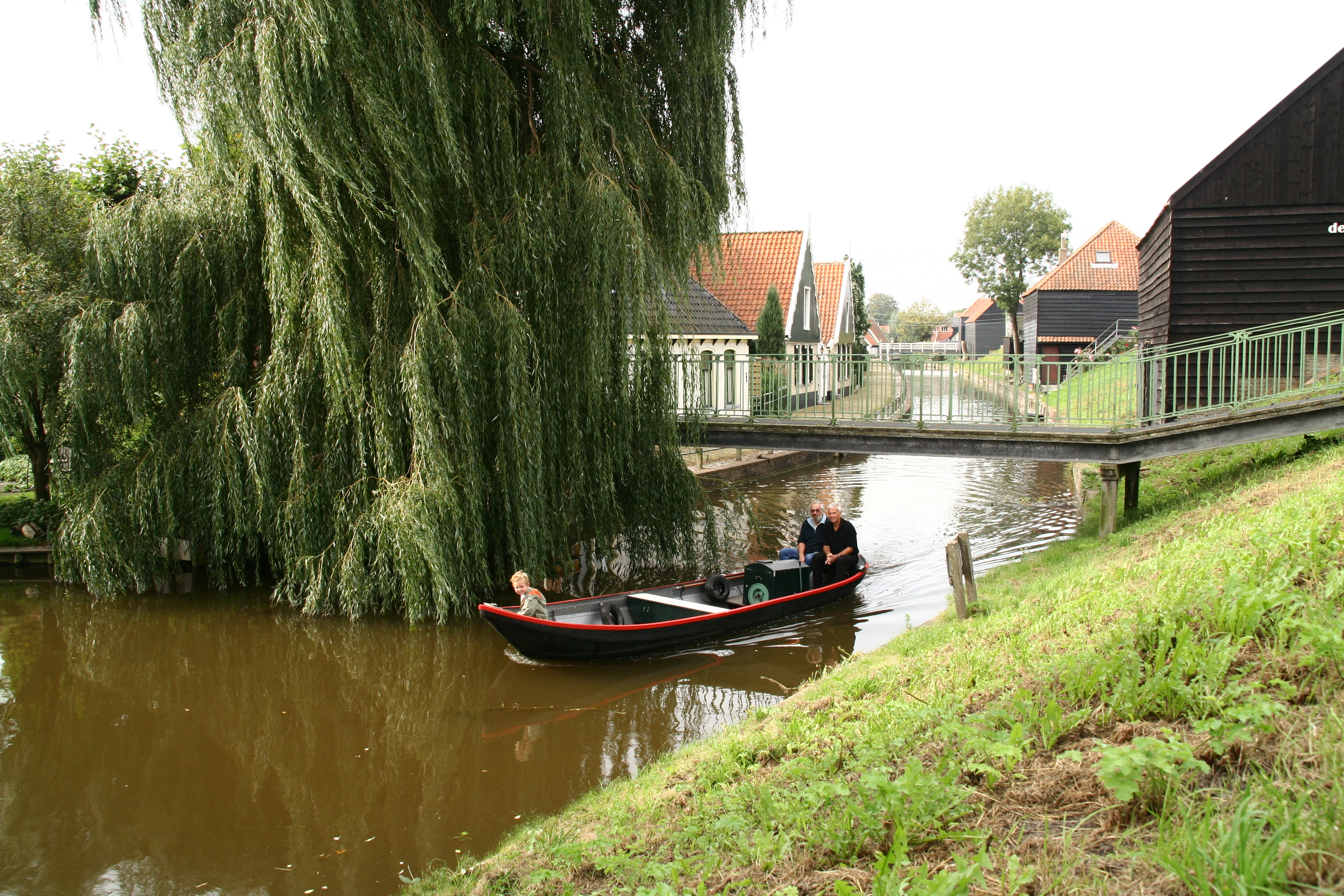
The "Oude Streek" in Kolhorn with the so called "School bridge"

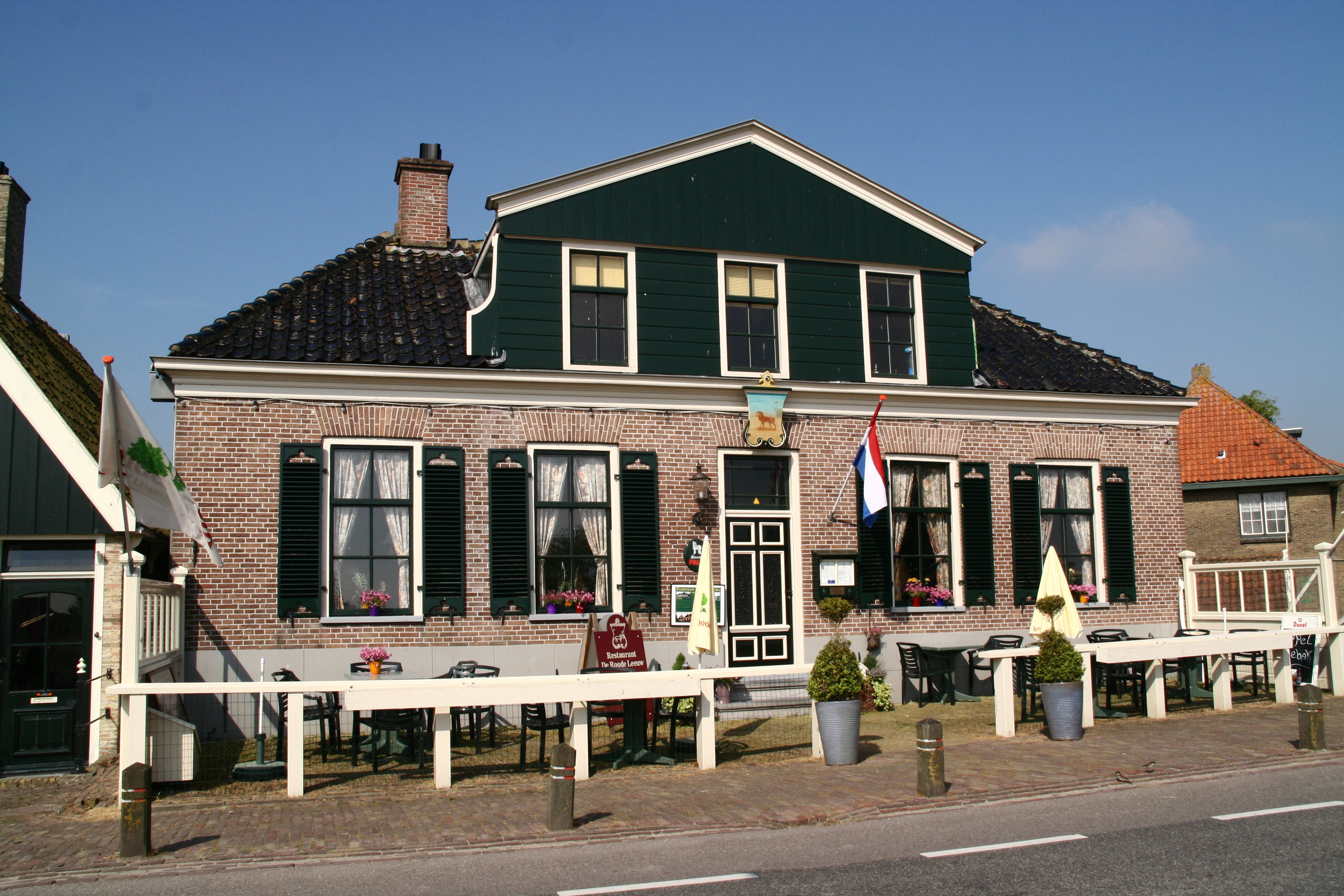
Restaurant "De Roode Leeuw"

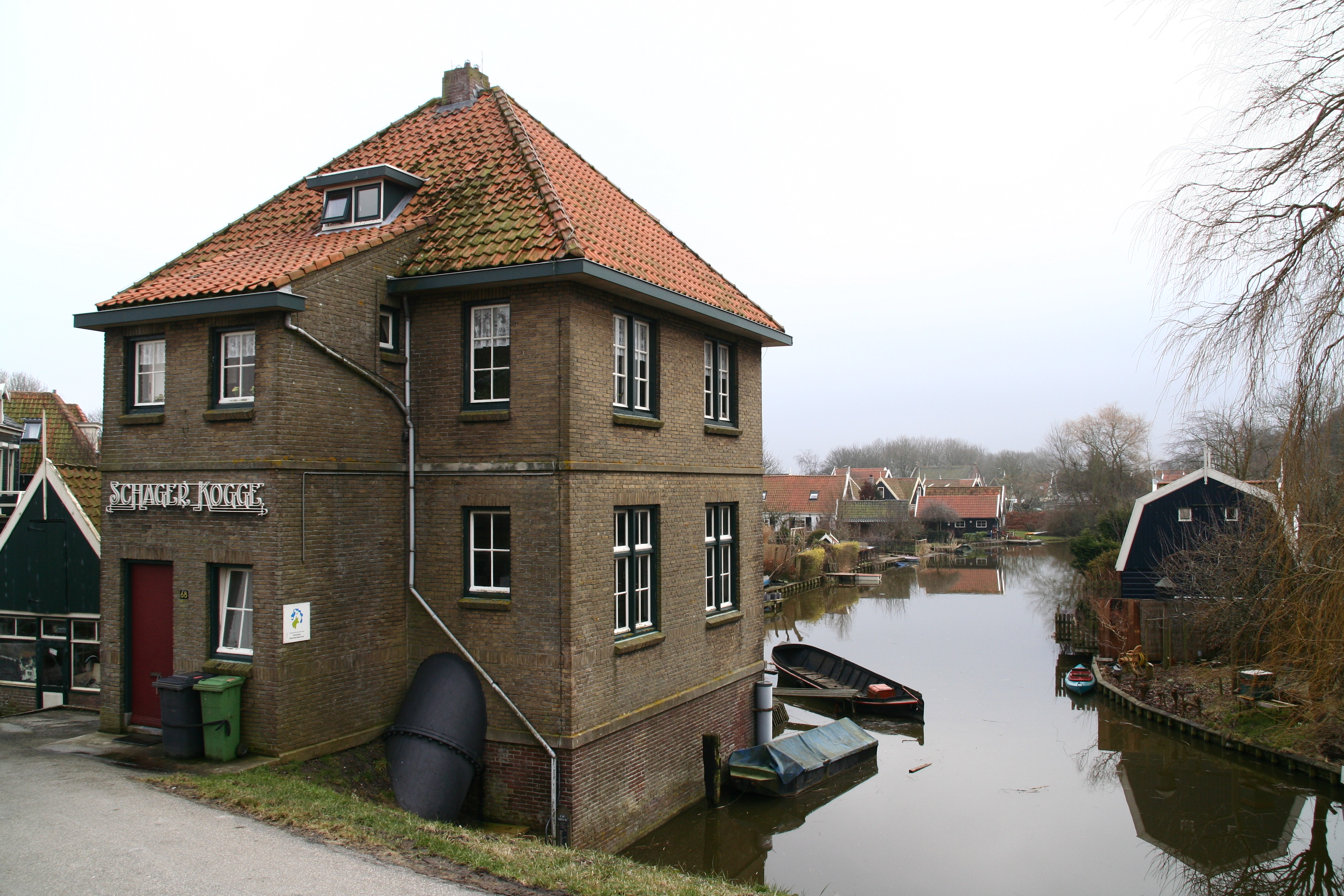
Pump Station "Schager Kogge"
