= Westerland, Netherlands =

Westerland
- Village
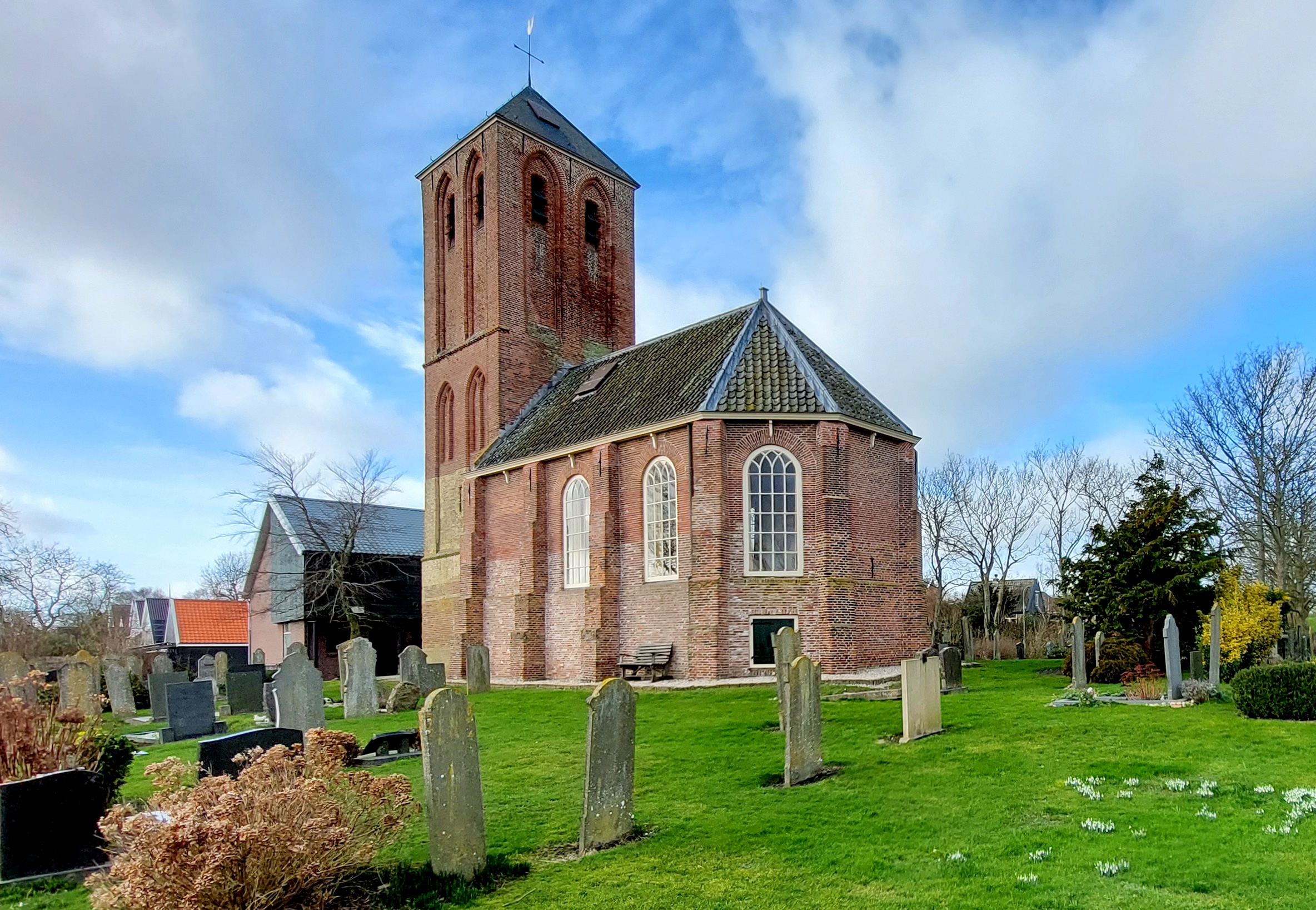
- Dutch Reformed church

- Location in the Netherlands Location in the province of North Holland in the Netherlands
- Coordinates: 52°54′N 4°56′E
- Country: Netherlands
- Province: North Holland
- Municipality: Hollands Kroon

Area
  - Village: 4.39 km^{2} (1.69 sq mi)
- Elevation: 3.9 m (13 ft)

Population (2025)
  - Village: 770
  - Density: 180/km^{2} (450/sq mi)
  - Urban: 655
  - Rural: 115
- Time zone: UTC+1 (CET)
  - Summer (DST): UTC+2 (CEST)
- Postal code: 1778
- Dialing code: 0227

Westerland is a village in the Dutch province of North Holland. It is a part of the municipality of Hollands Kroon, and lies about 13 km southeast of Den Helder.

The village was first mentioned in 1343 or 1344 as "van Westenlande", and means "western land". It was located on the former island of Wieringen. Wester (western) has been added to distinguish from Oosterland.

The Dutch Reformed church is a single aisled church. The tower dates from around 1500. The current roof was probably added during the 1913 restoration.

== Gallery ==
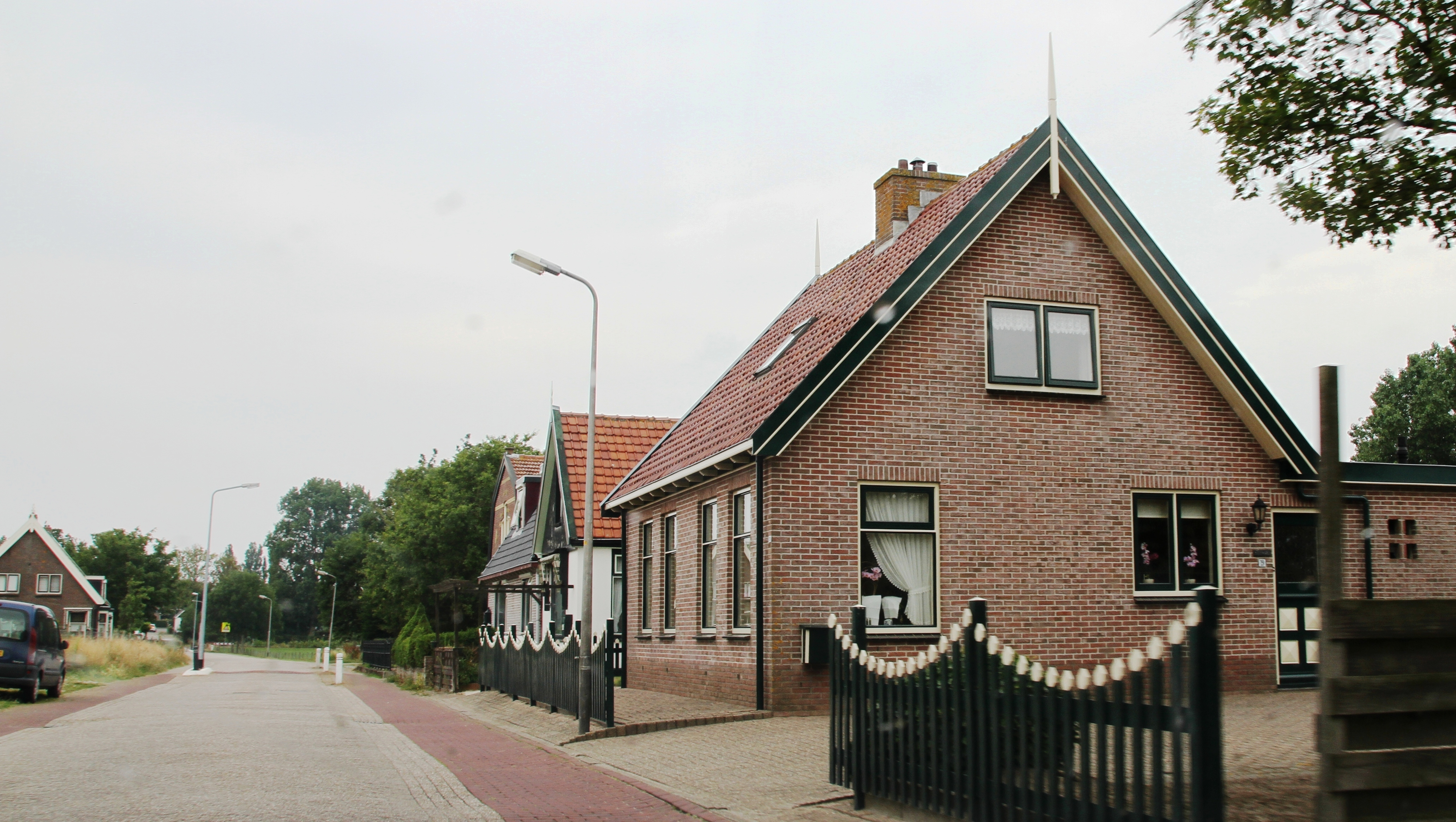
Street view

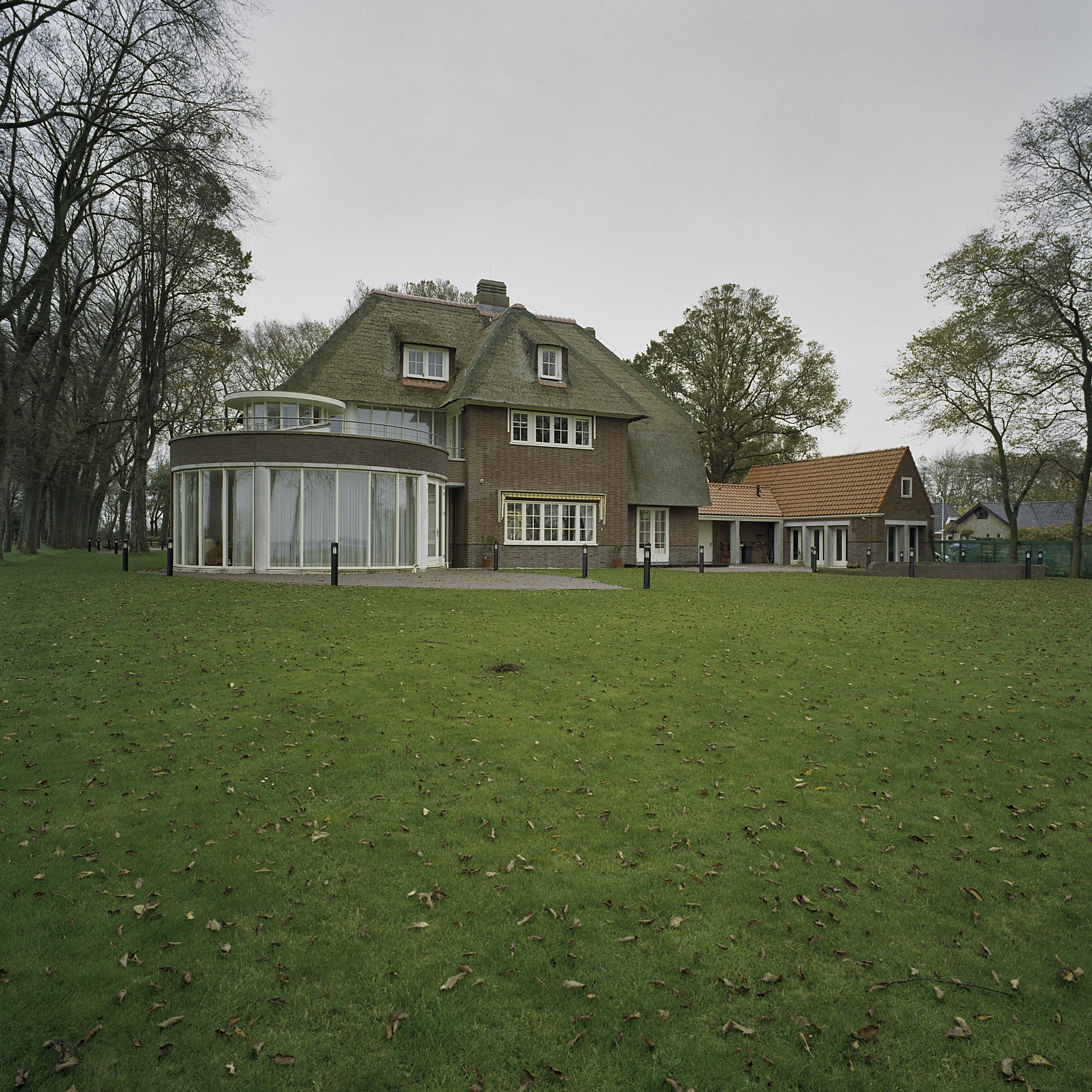
Villa in Westerland
