= Oosterland, North Holland =

Oosterland
- Village
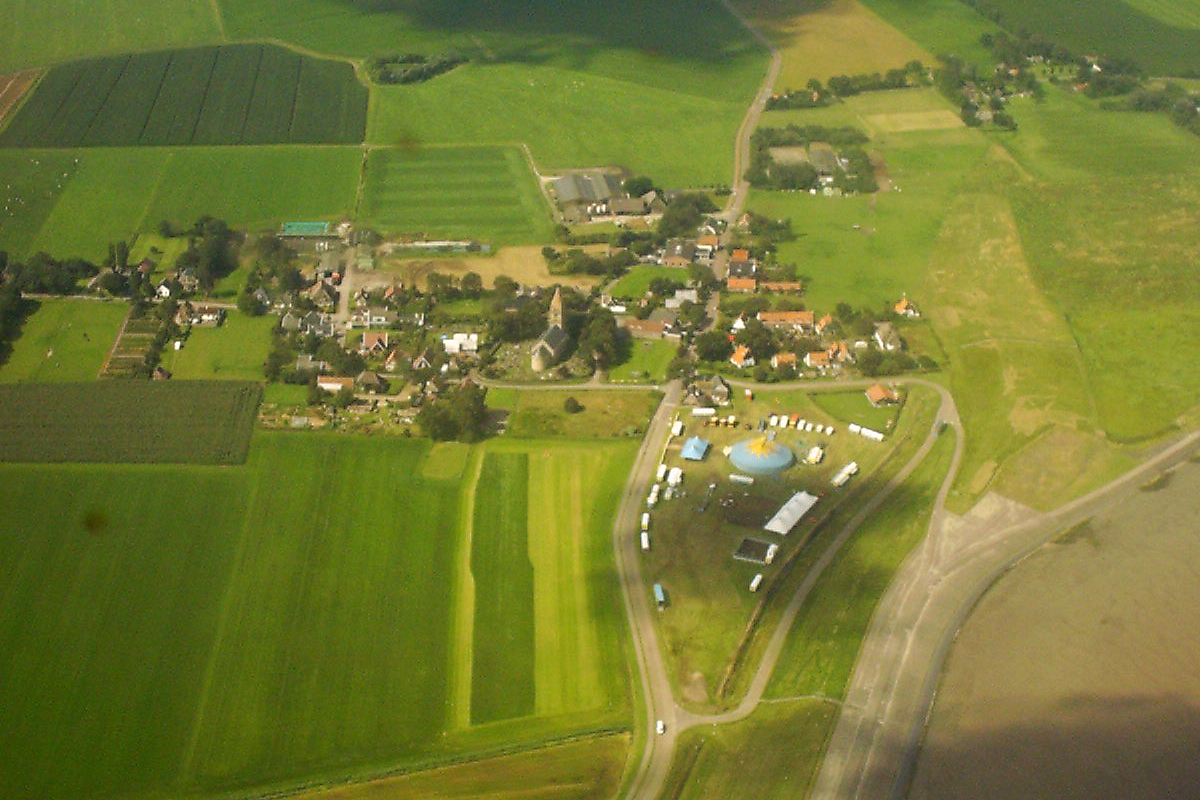
- Aerial view

- Location in the Netherlands Location in the province of North Holland in the Netherlands
- Coordinates: 52°56′N 5°1′E
- Country: Netherlands
- Province: North Holland
- Municipality: Hollands Kroon

Area
  - Total: 0.17 km^{2} (0.066 sq mi)
- Elevation: 1.6 m (5.2 ft)

Population (2025)
  - Total: 175
  - Density: 1,000/km^{2} (2,700/sq mi)
- Time zone: UTC+1 (CET)
  - Summer (DST): UTC+2 (CEST)
- Postal code: 1779
- Dialing code: 0227

Oosterland is a village in the Dutch province of North Holland. It is a part of the municipality of Hollands Kroon, and lies about 17 kilometres (11 mi) southeast of Den Helder. From 1918 to 1923, Oosterland was the residence of the exiled German crown prince, Friedrich Wilhelm von Hohenzollern.

== History ==
The village was first mentioned in 1343 or 1344 as "van Oestenlande", and means "eastern land". It was located on the former island of Wieringen. Oost (east) has been added to distinguish from Westerland. Oosterland is a church village which developed in the 11th century.

The Dutch Reformed church was built on a slight elevation around 1100. The tower probably dates from the 13th century, and contains a bell from 1499. The church was restored between 1888 and 1890 by Pierre Cuypers.

Oosterland was home to 125 people in 1840. Between 1925 and 1928, a little neighbourhood was built in Oosterland for the engineers of the Zuiderzee project which transformed the former sea into the lake IJsselmeer.

== Gallery ==
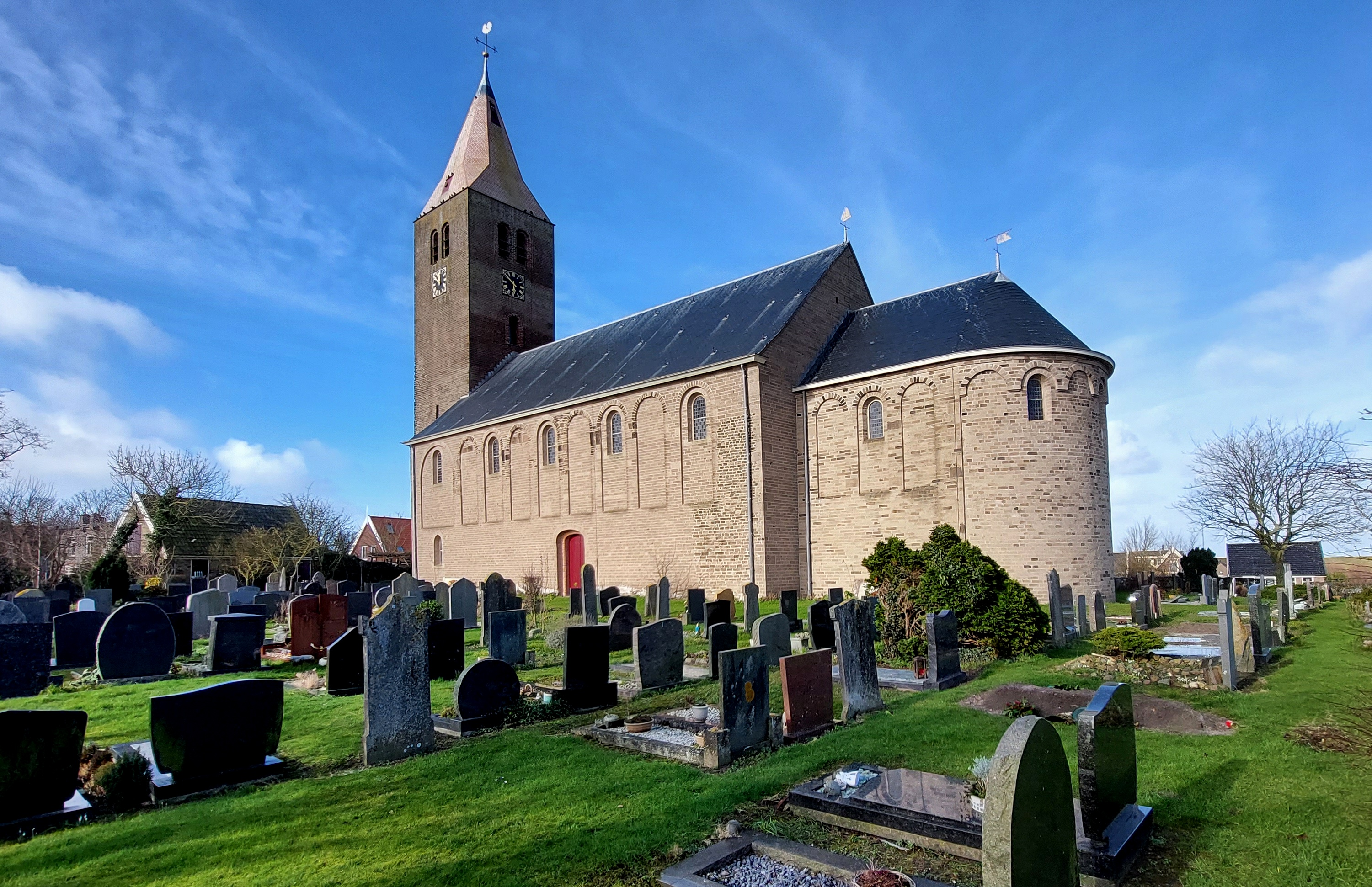
Dutch Reformed Church

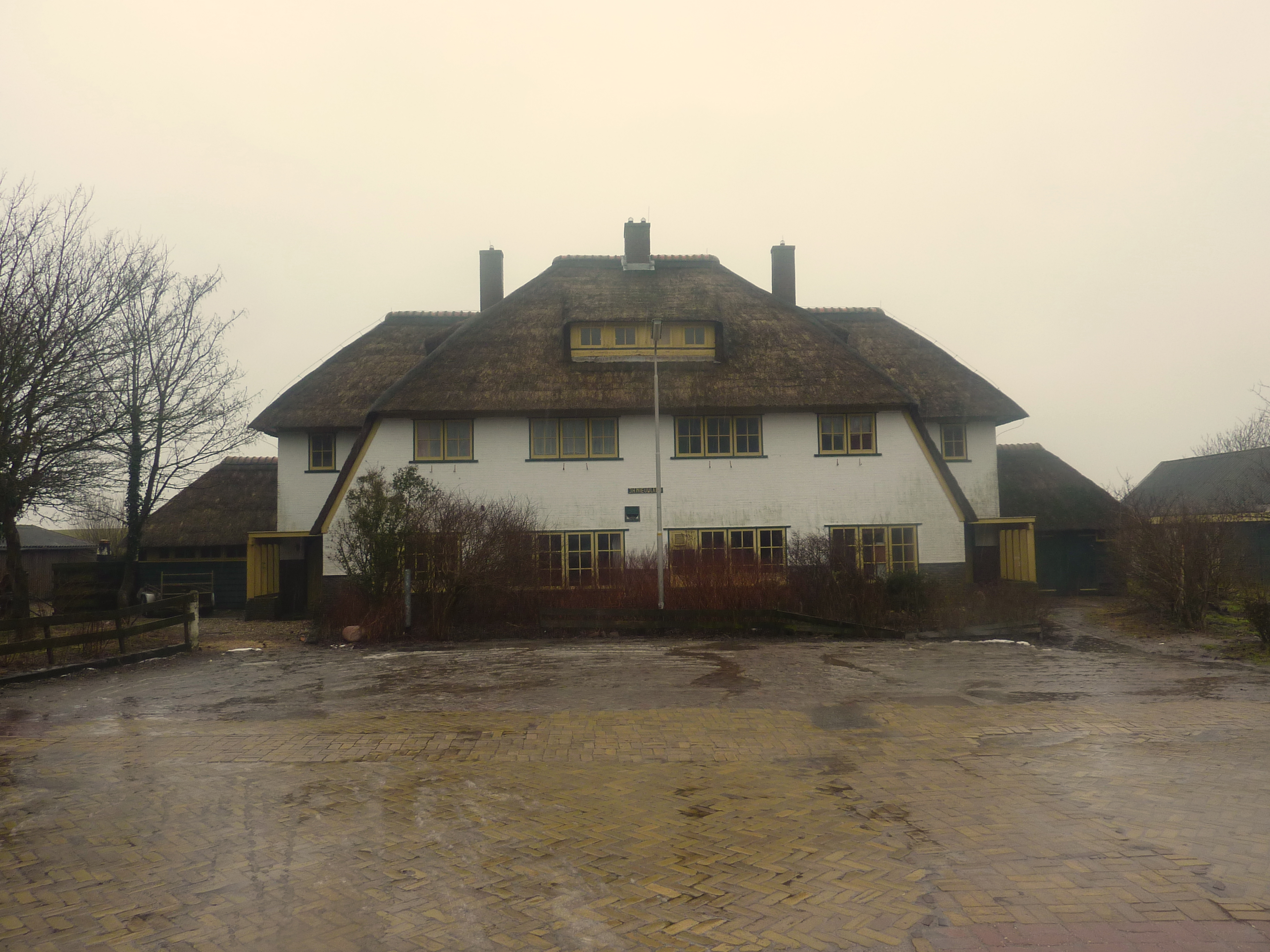
Villa in Oosterland

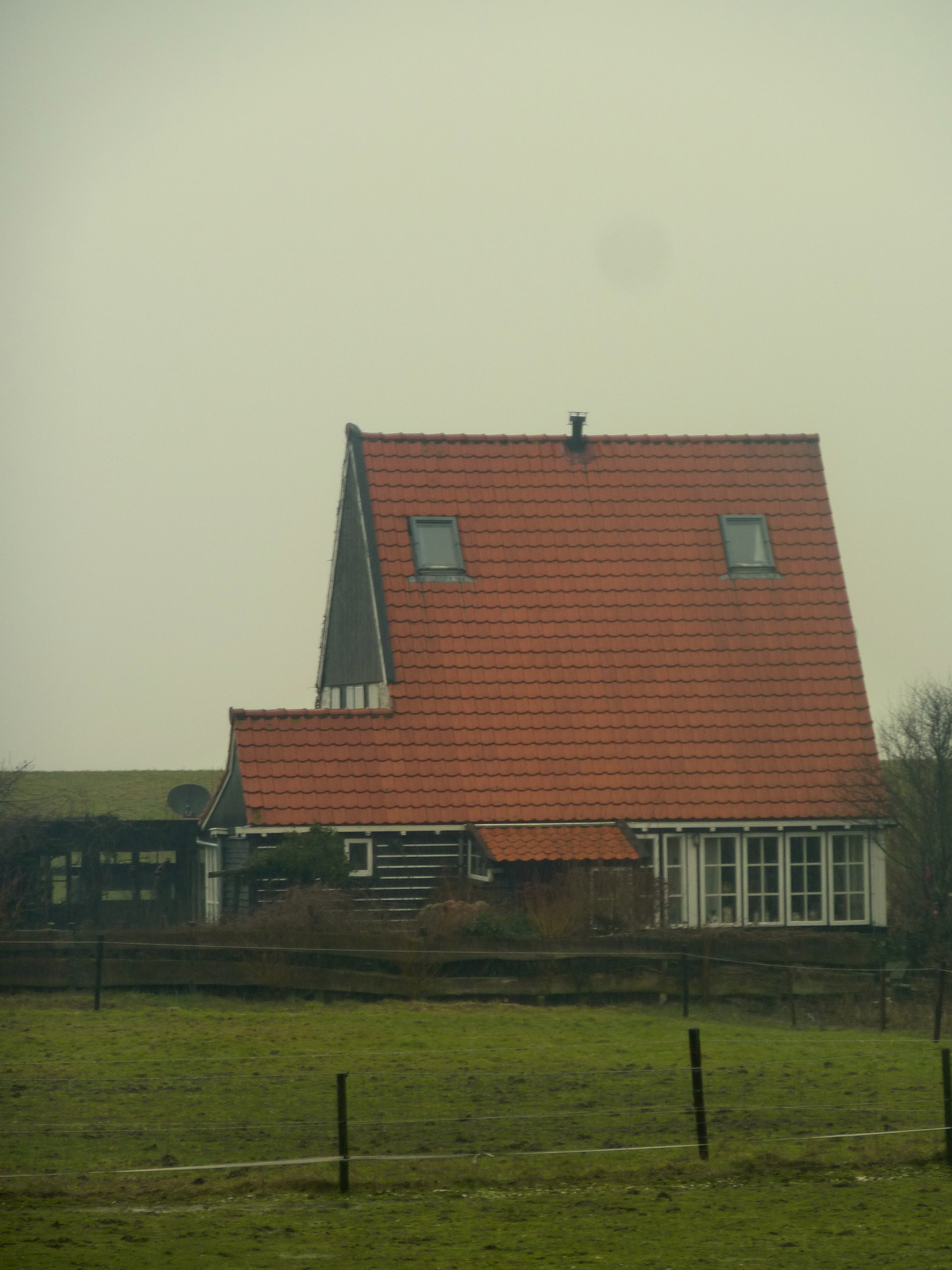
House in Oosterland
