= Haringhuizen =

- Village
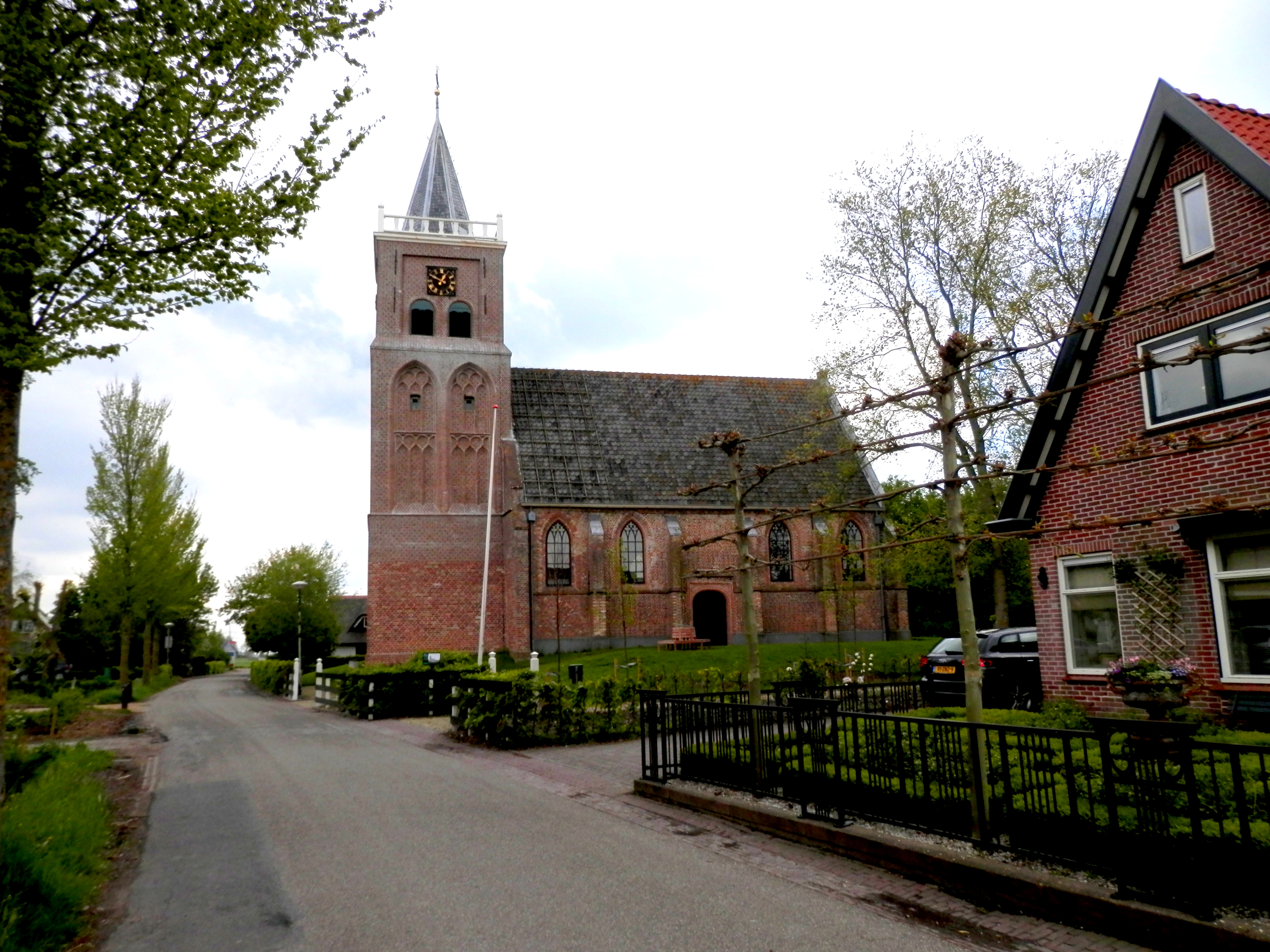
- Street view with church

- Location in the Netherlands Location in the province of North Holland in the Netherlands
- Coordinates: 52°46′24″N 4°49′44″E
- Country: Netherlands
- Province: North Holland
- Municipality: Hollands Kroon

Area
  - Village: 3.72 km^{2} (1.44 sq mi)
- Elevation: 0.1 m (0.33 ft)

Population (2025)
  - Village: 185
  - Density: 49.7/km^{2} (129/sq mi)
  - Urban: 125
  - Rural: 55
- Time zone: UTC+1 (CET)
  - Summer (DST): UTC+2 (CEST)
- Postal code: 1769
- Dialing code: 0224

Haringhuizen (West Frisian: Heringhúze) is a village in the Dutch province of North Holland. It is a part of the municipality of Hollands Kroon, and lies about 11 km north of Heerhugowaard.

The village was first mentioned in 1344 as Heringhehusen, and means "settlement of the people of Here (person)". The Dutch Reformed church was built around 1470 on a terp (artificial living hill). It was damaged by the English in 1799. In 1808, the northern aisle was demolished and the choir was restored in 1842.
