= 't Veld =

- Village
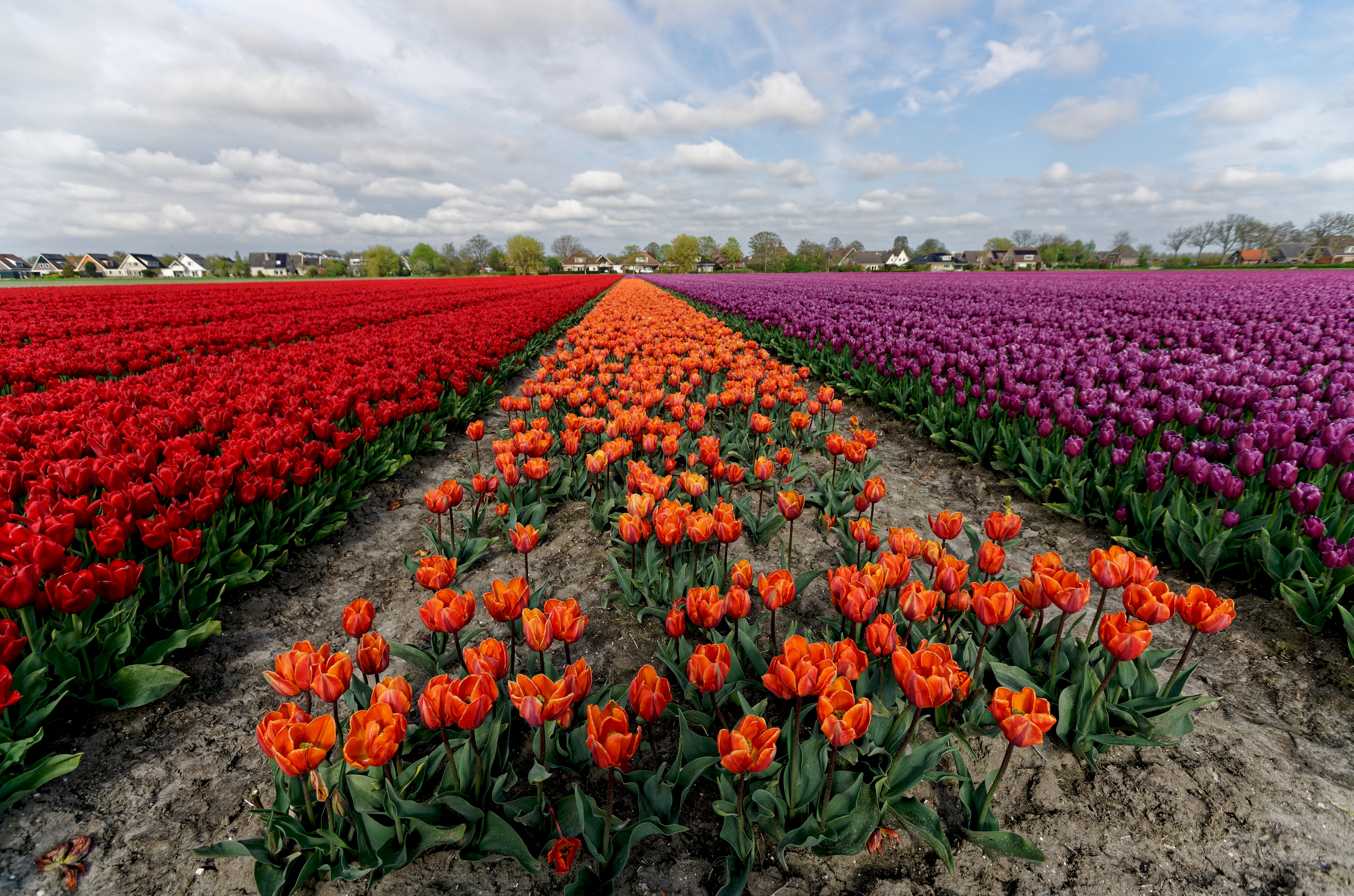
- Tulips in 't Veld

- Location in the Netherlands Location in the province of North Holland in the Netherlands
- Coordinates: 52°44′N 4°51′E
- Country: Netherlands
- Province: North Holland
- Municipality: Hollands Kroon

Area
  - Village: 8.40 km^{2} (3.24 sq mi)
- Elevation: −0.8 m (−2.6 ft)

Population (2025)
  - Village: 2,280
  - Density: 271/km^{2} (703/sq mi)
  - Urban: 1,970
  - Rural: 310
- Time zone: UTC+1 (CET)
  - Summer (DST): UTC+2 (CEST)
- Postal code: 1735
- Dialing code: 0226

't Veld is a village in the Dutch province of North Holland. It is a part of the municipality of Hollands Kroon, and lies about 8 km north of Heerhugowaard.

The village was first mentioned between 1839 and 1859 as "'t Veld", and means "the field".
