= Van Ewijcksluis =

- Hamlet
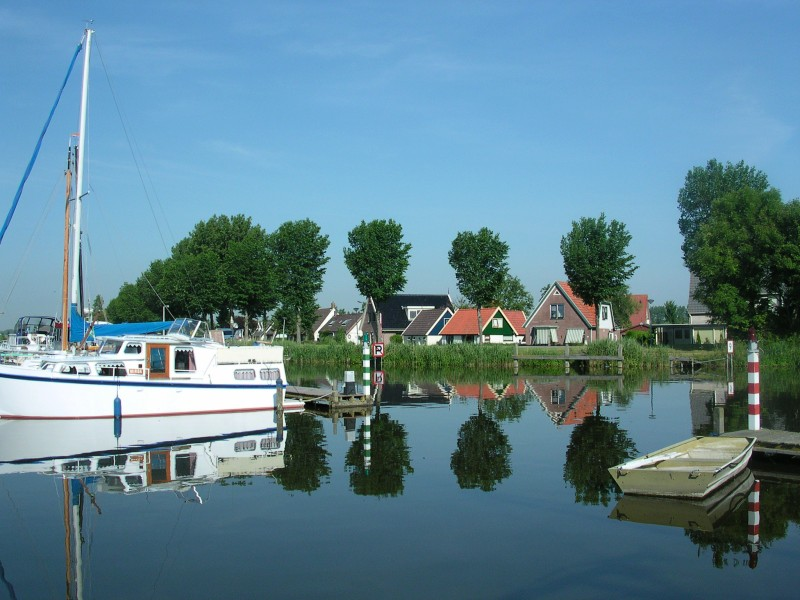

- Location in the Netherlands Location in the province of North Holland in the Netherlands
- Coordinates: 52°53′0″N 4°52′24″E
- Country: Netherlands
- Province: North Holland
- Municipality: Hollands Kroon

Area
  - Total: 0.45 km^{2} (0.17 sq mi)
- Elevation: −0.3 m (−0.98 ft)

Population (2025)
  - Total: 215
  - Density: 480/km^{2} (1,200/sq mi)
- Time zone: UTC+1 (CET)
  - Summer (DST): UTC+2 (CEST)
- Postal code: 1761
- Dialing code: 0223

Van Ewijcksluis is a hamlet in the Dutch province of North Holland. It is a part of the municipality of Hollands Kroon, and lies about 10 kilometres (6.2 mi) southeast of Den Helder.

Van Ewijcksluis is considered a part of Anna Paulowna. It is named after Daniël Jacob van Ewijck, the King's commissioner of North Holland.
