= Zijdewind =

- Village
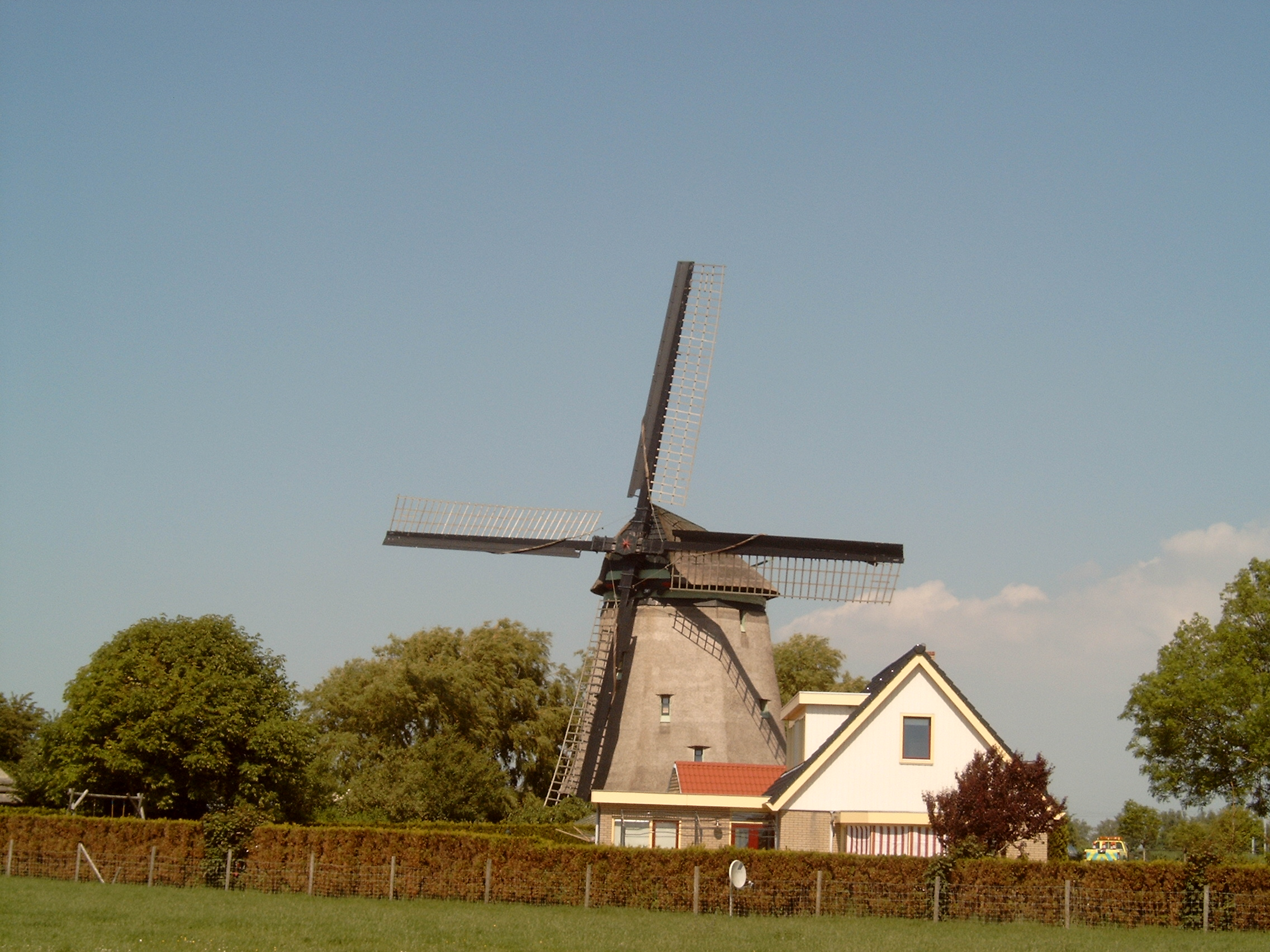

- Location in the Netherlands Location in the province of North Holland in the Netherlands
- Coordinates: 52°44′38″N 4°50′20″E
- Country: Netherlands
- Province: North Holland
- Municipality: Hollands Kroon

Area
  - Village: 2.24 km^{2} (0.86 sq mi)
- Elevation: −0.8 m (−2.6 ft)

Population (2025)
  - Village: 405
  - Density: 181/km^{2} (468/sq mi)
  - Urban: 290
  - Rural: 110
- Time zone: UTC+1 (CET)
  - Summer (DST): UTC+2 (CEST)
- Postal code: 1736
- Dialing code: 0226

Zijdewind (West Frisian: Sidewind) is a village in the Dutch province of North Holland. It is a part of the municipality of Hollands Kroon, and lies about 8 km north of Heerhugowaard.

The village was first mentioned in 1421 as Nuwe Nyedorper Zydwijnde, and means "sidewards located dike". Zijdewind started as a peat excavation village. In 1652, a church was built, but was decommissioned. It was used as a farm and often mockingly called the cow church. In 1970, it was demolished to make way for a roundabout.

The statistical area "Zijdewind", which also can include the surrounding countryside, has a population of around 310.
