= Lutjewinkel =

- Village
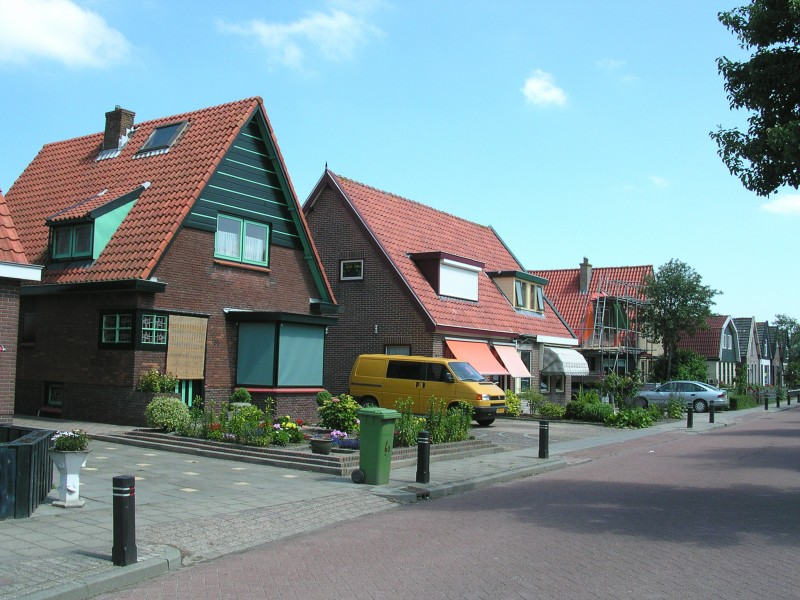

- Location in the Netherlands Location in the province of North Holland in the Netherlands
- Coordinates: 52°46′8″N 4°52′58″E
- Country: Netherlands
- Province: North Holland
- Municipality: Hollands Kroon

Area
  - Village: 10.90 km^{2} (4.21 sq mi)
- Elevation: −0.2 m (−0.66 ft)

Population (2025)
  - Village: 770
  - Density: 71/km^{2} (180/sq mi)
  - Urban: 455
  - Rural: 315
- Time zone: UTC+1 (CET)
  - Summer (DST): UTC+2 (CEST)
- Postal code: 1732
- Dialing code: 0224

Lutjewinkel is a village in the Dutch province of North Holland. It is a part of the municipality of Hollands Kroon, and lies about 11 kilometres (6.8 mi) north of Heerhugowaard.

The village was first mentioned in 1680 as Lutke Winckel, and means "little Winkel". It was founded as a daughter settlement of Winkel.

Lutjewinkel was home to 171 people in 1840. It is best known for its 1906 cheese factory. It is one of the largest dairy factories and is nowadays owned by FrieslandCampina.

== Gallery ==
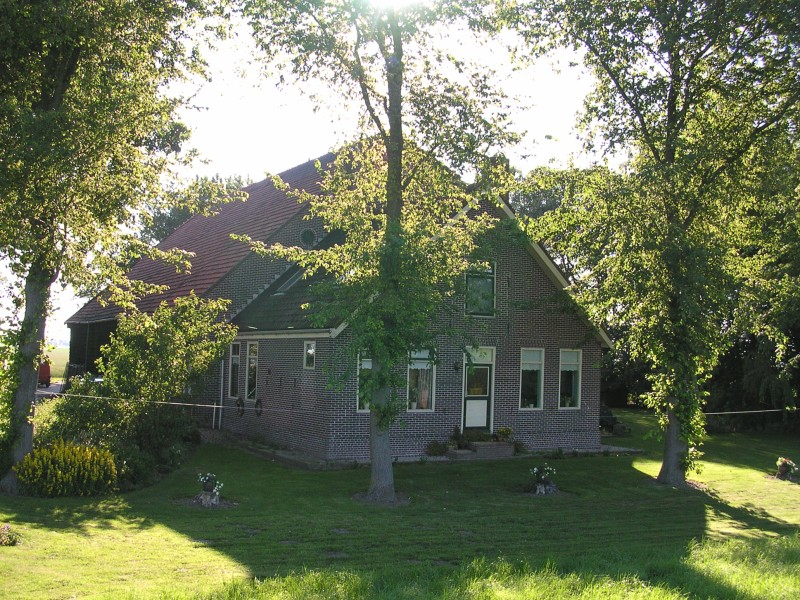
Farm in Lutjewinkel

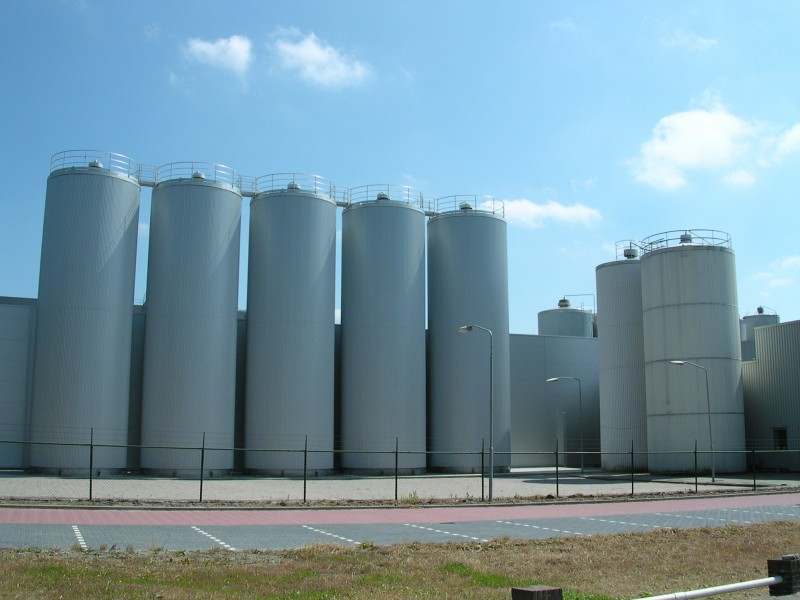
Cheese factory
