= Wieringerwaard =

- Village
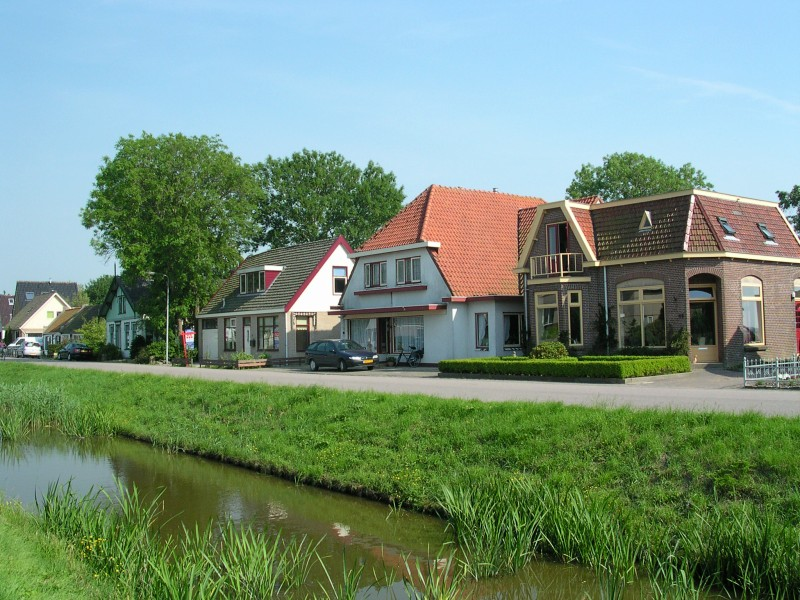

- Coat of arms

- Location in the Netherlands Location in the province of North Holland in the Netherlands
- Coordinates: 52°50′24″N 4°52′4″E
- Country: Netherlands
- Province: North Holland
- Municipality: Hollands Kroon

Area
  - Village: 24.15 km^{2} (9.32 sq mi)
- Elevation: −1.2 m (−3.9 ft)

Population (2025)
  - Village: 2,275
  - Density: 94.20/km^{2} (244.0/sq mi)
  - Urban: 1,845
  - Rural: 430
- Time zone: UTC+1 (CET)
  - Summer (DST): UTC+2 (CEST)
- Postal code: 1766
- Dialing code: 0224

Wieringerwaard is a polder and a village in the municipality of Hollands Kroon in the Dutch province of North Holland. Wieringerwaard was formerly a separate municipality, until it merged with Barsingerhorn in 1970.

== History ==
The polder was laid dry in 1610. It border, and also the border of the municipality, were the Zuiderzee, the dike-ditches along the outside of the Westfriese Omringdijk and the Slikkerdijk of the Zijpe. In 1970, Wieringerwaard became part of the municipality of Barsingerhorn, but in 1990 it was separated from this municipality and added to the municipality of Anna Paulowna.

The area was already inhabited before 1610. In the two centuries before the All Saints' Flood of 1170 there were already Frisians in the area, later called West Frisians. After the many storms which raged around the 12th century the area became uninhabitable. After the area was drained in 1610 it became populated again. In the northern part of the area settlements slowly formed. Eventually, a ribbon shaped village formed between the 1621 lock in the Slikkerdijk and the ditch named De Kolk. This village was named after the polder. After a new lock was constructed on the other side of De Kolk, at the Pishoek and the Waardkanaal, a settlement center arose there. This center was named Nieuwesluis.

In 1742, on top of the Noorderdijk, a windmill was built. The settlement center which arose there was named De Molens, and five other windmills appeared around the same time and ensured the draining of the polder. More houses appeared around these mills than in the ribbon shaped village. With the construction of the church in 1812, that tendency became stronger, and "Wieringerwaard" meant the village round the mills, and the placename De Molens disappeared. In 1949, the lock in the Slikkerdijk, which had already been renewed twice, was demolished, which was a reason for the village not to be extended in that direction.

== Curiosities ==
As well as het Witte Kerkje there are more curiosities in Wieringerwaard, such as many monumental farms. The windmill named De Hoop, which was built in 1742 and which was converted to a corn mill in 1972, is open for visitors every Saturday, weekday only on appointment. Wieringerwaard also has a water tower.

Every year at the beginning of May the flower days are held. Flower mosaics made of hyacinths are to be seen in the village on these days.

== In popular culture ==
In 2008 the late Dutch singer Rob de Nijs recorded the song Wieringerwaard as part of his album Chansons. The song is an adaptation by Jan Rot of the French song Les Lacs du Connemara by Michel Sardou. In Wieringerwaard, de Nijs transforms the original's Irish landscape into a portrayal of the Dutch polder region, capturing the essence of the Dutch countryside. The lyrics depict the rural life and traditions of the Wieringerwaard area, highlighting its landscapes, community events, and cultural values. The song reflects on the simplicity and authenticity of life in this Dutch region.
