= Wannenburgh =

German surname

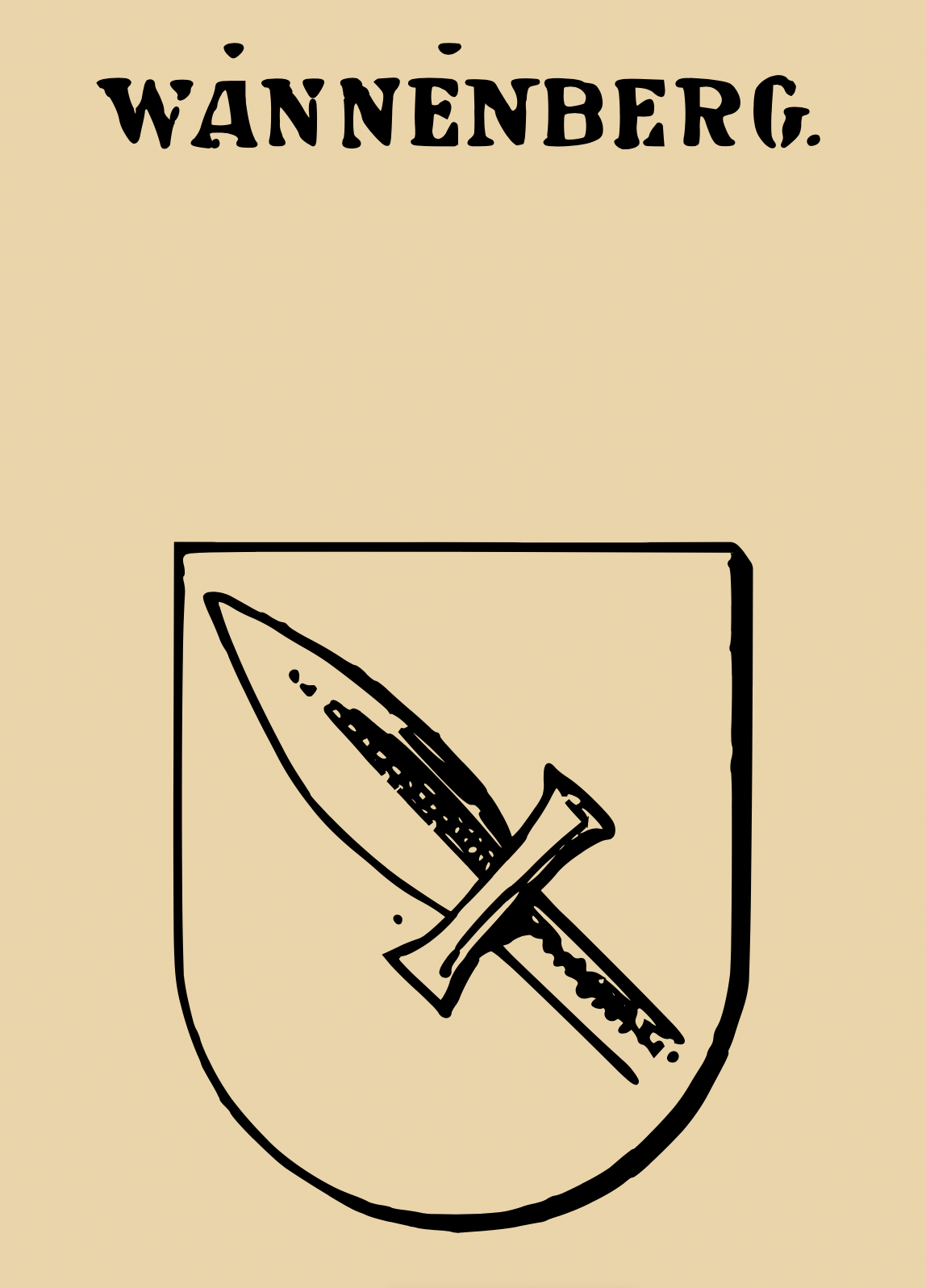
‘Wannenberg’ family sigil from 1344 in Johann Siebmacher's 1978 Die Wappen des Adels in Pommern und Mecklenburg. Volume 18 of Grosses Wappenbuch.

Wannenburgh is an old and relatively rare South German toponymic surname meaning "tub[-shaped] castle", or "tub[-shaped] mountain" in the case of Wannenberg(h). The "Wan[n]enburg" spelling appears later (circa 1471) than the earlier "Wahne[n]bergen" and "Wanenberg[h]" spellings in Germanic records. Among variant forms are Wannenberg(h), Wanenbergh, Wanenberc(h), Wanenberg(e), and Wa(h)ne(n)berg(en [medieval plural form]).

In medieval literature, the "gh" digraph is usually replaced with a "ch". Renaissance-era Dutch Republic archives have it written as Wannenbúrg(h). The Schleswig-Holsteinische Regesten und Urkunden refers to the first instance of someone bearing this family name as early as 1162—namely the ministerialis and advocatus ('Vogt zu Verden'), Conrad I von Wanebergen, of Verden an der Aller in Lower Saxony. Conrad I, whose ancestors likely also lived near the Weser, was a vassal of Henry the Lion by 1162. The oldest variant form, Wa(h)nebergen, is notably found in the Verdener Urkundenbuches or Urkundenbuch der Bischöfe und des Domkapitels von Verden and Wilhelm Freiherr von Hodenberg's Lüneburger Urkundenbuch: Archiv des Klosters St. Johannis zu Walsrode.

== Etymology ==
The exact etymological origin of the earliest variant form, Wa(h)ne(n)bergen, was inter-textually reviewed and debated between the early and mid-1800s by Wilhelm von Hodenberg (a distant relation of the early Wahnebergen knights through the Counts of Hoya), Ernst Peter Johann Spangenberg, Wilhelm von Hammerstein-Loxten, and Christoph Gottlieb Pfannkuche.

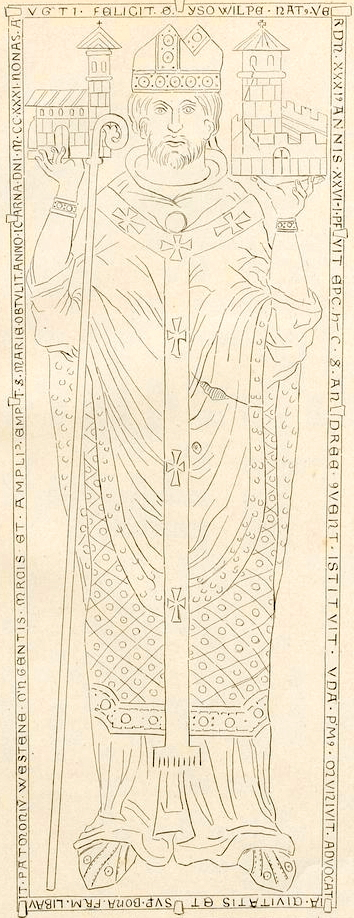
Prince-Bishop Iso von Wölpe of Verden (Aller).

Spangenberg and Hammerstein-Loxten explore that the family were also possibly recorded as 'von Bergen' (with less certainty) and 'de Monte' (an unastute Latinised form meaning 'from the mountain') which infinitesimally may or may not correctly speak to the etymological origin of the surname. The Latinised form of the name used in the late 1100s and early 1200s arising from Latin's role as Roman Catholicism's lingua franca throughout Europe and therefore being the primary language used for church records, may have muddled the original root of the name. Hodenburg believes there to be no verifiable blood connection between the 'dynastae' von Wa(h)ne(n)bergen and the 'dynasten' de Monte/vom Berge of Minden and also suggests that their name likely came from the rural farming village of Wahnebergen near Verden ('Amt Westen') which may have also been a von Wahnebergen feudal possession for a time. The present-day village of Wahnebergen claims the reverse—that it was the village that took its name from the Wahnebergen family. Christian Ulrich Grupen (1766) cites the von Wahnebergen as 'dynastae' (dynasts) and 'viri nobiles' (noblemen) and singularly reasons that their family status was similar to that enjoyed by the Edelherren von Westen at one point.

Pfannkuche entertains the theory that the de Monte and von Wahnebergen families were two branches of the same dynasty holding secular church offices (Vogtei Verden and Vogtei Minden) in Verden and Minden but came from the same source. Spangenberg affirms that the von Wahnebergen family must have held significant power in the High Middle Ages (and possibly earlier) to have enabled the Bishopric of Verden under Iso von Wölpe to at last gain autonomy over the surrounding agrarian territories predominantly through their negotiated renouncement to the office of Vogt zu Verden, the waived von Westen bequest, and the expedited sale and surrender of numerous feudal dominions comprising farming villages, windmills, and access/water rights to nearby rivers. The connection (if any) between the von dem Berge/vom Berge and Wahnebergen is further muddled by a Hildesheim cathedral provost named Johannes de Monte (1219-1230) who was erroneously thought to be Conrad I von Wahnebergen's nephew, but is more likely a similarly named vom Berge/von dem Berge (of Minden) relation of Prince-Bishop Iso von Wölpe of Verden.

== Medieval decline, migration, and variant forms ==
These variant forms likely arose from early phonetic spellings, widespread illiteracy, and various contending vernaculars alongside 'Vulgar' and Classical Latin which influenced orthography (spelling) and phonology (stress or accent) used in Lower Saxony and Mecklenburg-Vorpommern, respectively—particularly during the Obotrite ascendancy and Ostsiedlung of the High and Late Middle Ages in Brandenburg and Mecklenburg.

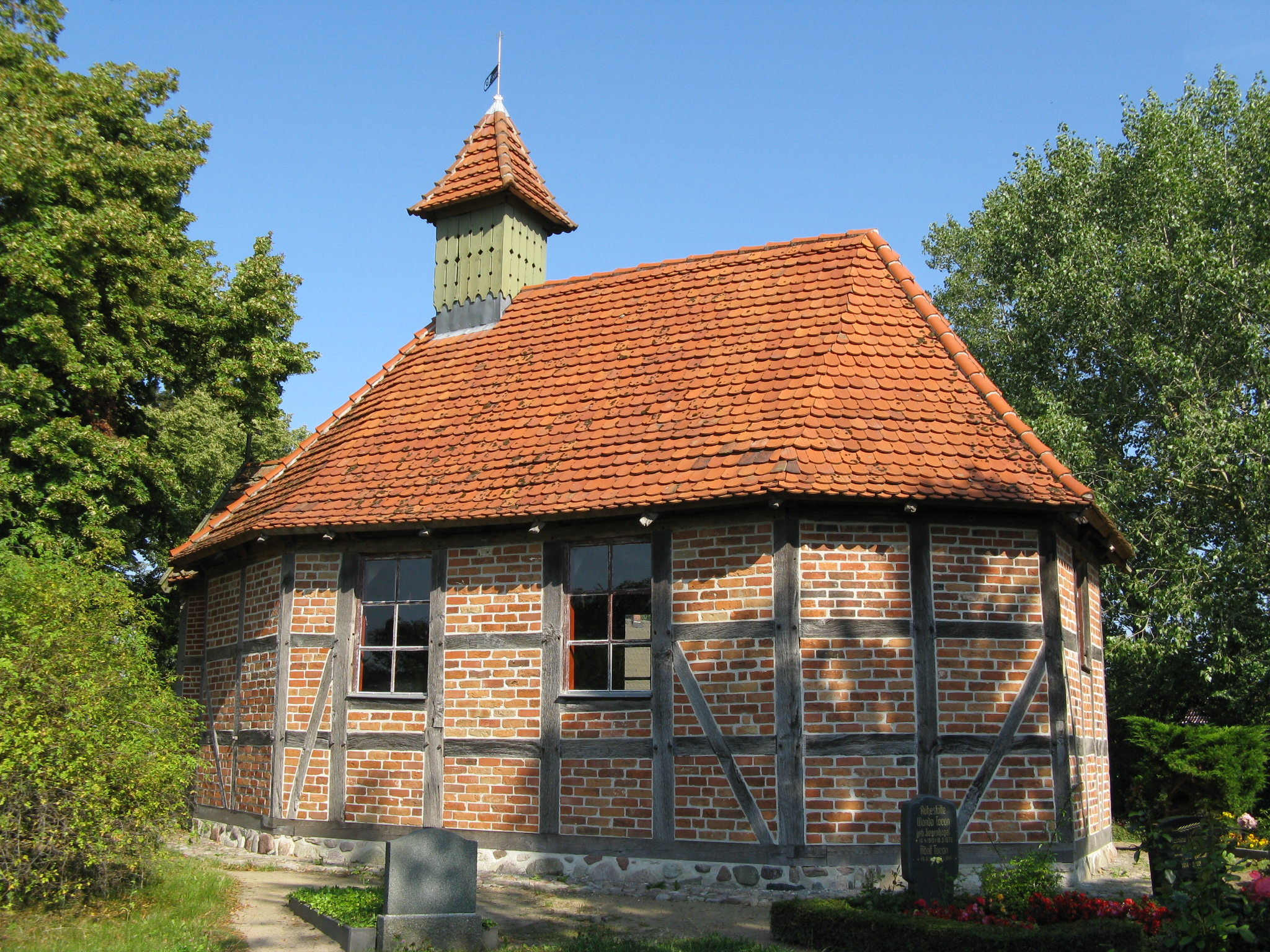
Sarmstorf church.

By the mid-1400s, the remaining Knappen (hereditary squires [an honorific then popular with Mecklenburg's untitled nobility]) von Wanenberg(h) held local political and minor diplomatic posts in Mecklenburg, but had already sold (1347) their possessions in Mickow or Mików (Mücka, Görlitz) and three-quarters of Sarmstorf (a rural Rostock farming village) and a constituent or nearby elevation ('hebungen')—which was their primary squirely possession (a recognised, hereditary 'knappenbesitz'). The elevation was sold by Henneke and Heinrich to Knappen Henneke Bengersdorp (November 29, 1342), the three-quarters of Sarmstorf by Johann and Heinrich (and Elisabeth Wanenberg née von Mikow) to Johann von Köln and Jacob Wörpel (December 29, 1339 to January 20/27, 1347 [after their father, N.N. Wanenberg, either assented or died) along with an oath (December 27, 1343) given at Güstrow to only recruit from their estate in Mików when performing rossdienst (a noble's military service) and to request no further aid from Sarmstorf. On November 1, 1346, the brothers promised to allow Johann von Köln to take occupancy once N.N. Wanenberg (their undisclosed father) sells the Sarmstorf estate. By 20 January 1347, N.N. Wanenberg was likely dead and the agreement was ratified by his widow and heirs. This promise was followed by a later confirmation of property transferral on 27 January 1347. To this end, Notably, the Wanenberg(h)s recorded after 1347 are no longer accorded the knappen honorific, but remained lower untitled nobility.

If the Lower Saxon, Mecklenburgian, and North Hollander branches are related, of which the two earliest 'branches' conceivably are, then the spelling used by the North Hollander branch was further changed by their pre-1647 migration to North Holland, where Dutch only began standardising in the second half of the seventeenth century and achieved 'unity in the written language' by that century's end.

There they resided in Gouwe, Opmeer for two of more generations and then in Amsterdam for four generations—beginning with (the progenitor?) Adolff Hendrikszoon Wannenbúrgh van der Gouwé—before Pieter Wannenburg(h) van Amsterdam left for the Cape of Good Hope, arriving 153 days later aboard the Petronella Alida, and subsequently sent for his wife, Alida Johanna de Waal (sister of burgher lieutenant and former quartermaster of the Doornik, 'Jan' de Waal), and son, Abraham Wannenburg (along with Abraham's wife, Engela Eversdijck). Pieter Wannenburgh asked for Free Burgher status between 1729 and 1732. Notable people with the surname include:

== Wa(h)nebergen of Verden (Aller) ==
=== Members ===
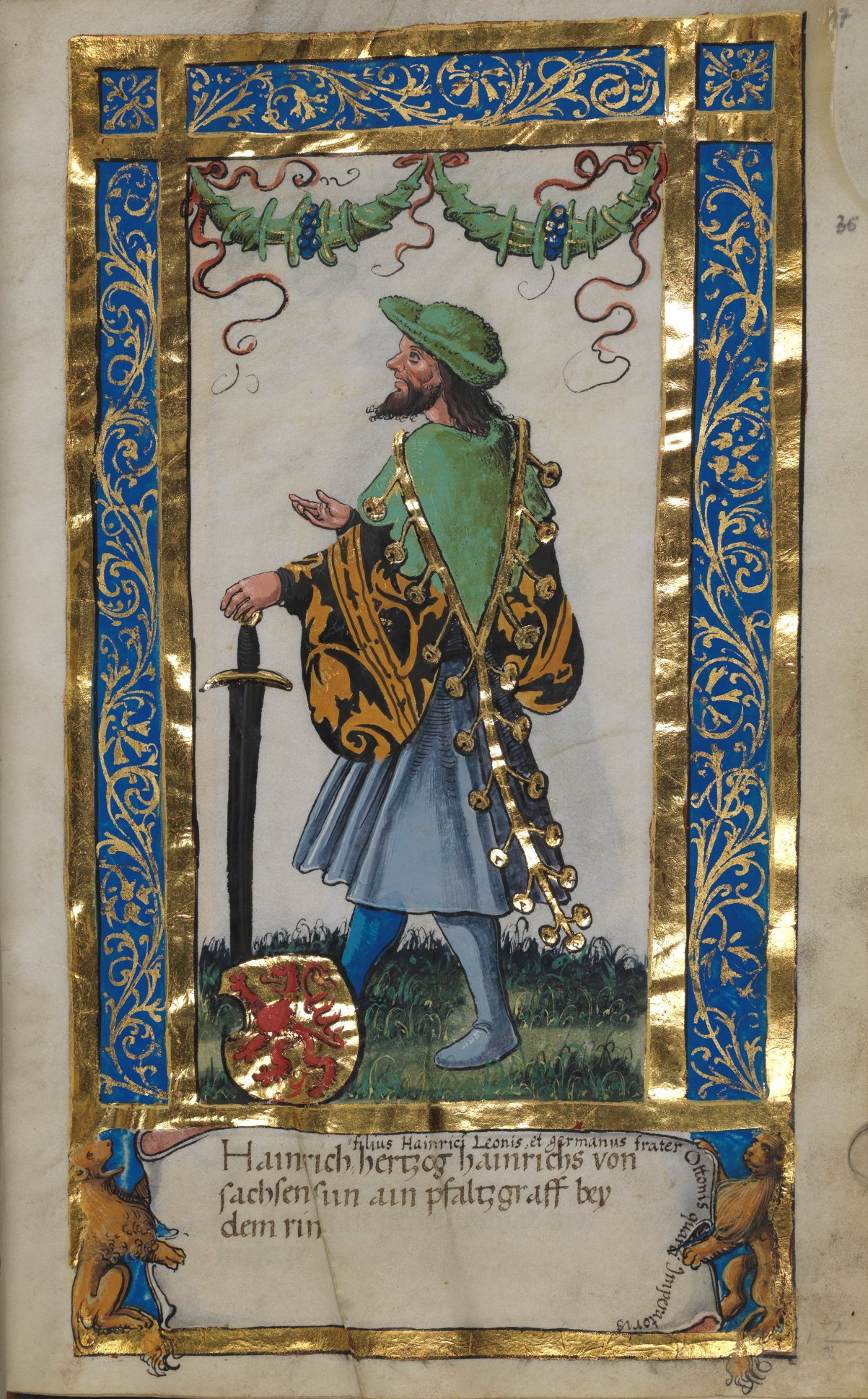
Pfalzgraf Heinrich in the Weingartener Stifterbüchlein (circa 1510).

- Advocatus Cuno/Conrad I the Elder von Wanebergen (before 1162–1222), Edelherr (Lower Saxon nobleman ['viri nobiles']); ecclesiastical advocate for Verden an der Aller under Tammo, Rudolf I(?), and Iso of Verden; and Guelphic ministerialis to Henry the Lion
- Ritter Cuno/Conrad II the Younger von Wanebergen, Guelphic ministerialis (dienstmann?) and vassal knight of Duke Henry V (the Elder) von Braunschweig,Count palatine of the Rhine (Conrad II's spouse: Ermengard Gräfin von Hoya)
- Ritter Heinrich von Wane(n)berg, Truchsess to Burchard II Graf von Wölpe & Elisabeth von Holstein-Itzehoe (Heinrich's spouse: the heiress, Lutchardis von Diepenau, Edelfrau von Diepenau and Gräfin von Wassel [last cited in 1283])

=== Arms ===
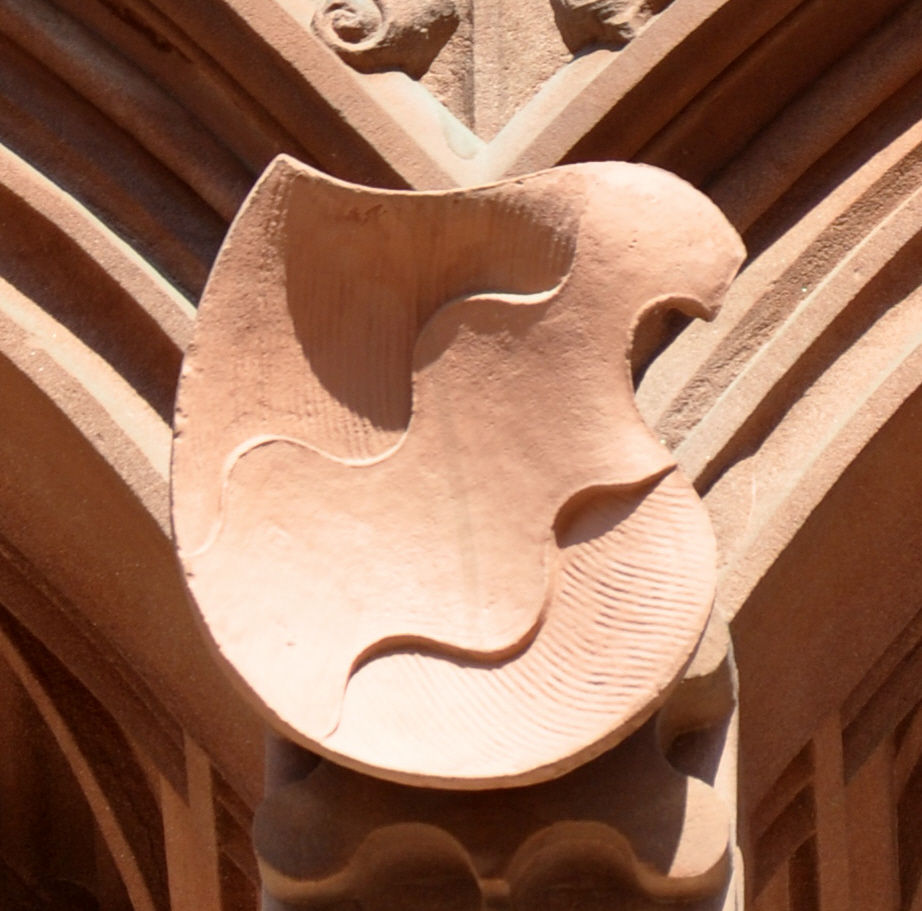
The arms (reminiscent of Wahnebergen village's arms) of the unrelated Frankfurter Wanebach family on the once separate but now joined medieval Haus Wanebach initially added to its neighbouring Haus Römer (in 1596) and Haus Löwenstein to form Frankfurt's existing Römer building.

Unknown ('Das Wappen der Herren von Wanebergen ist nicht bekannt' [instead, Count Burchard von Wölpe loaned his seal to Ritter Heinrich]). Despite this confirmation from Hodenberg, a former feudal possession of the Edelherren von Wa(h)nebergen know today as the (farming) village of Wahnebergen uses civic arms that claims some inspiration from the uncorroborated 'arms' of the since departed knights von Wa(h)nebergen yet oddly most resemble the unrelated arms of the patrician von Wanebach family of Frankfurt.

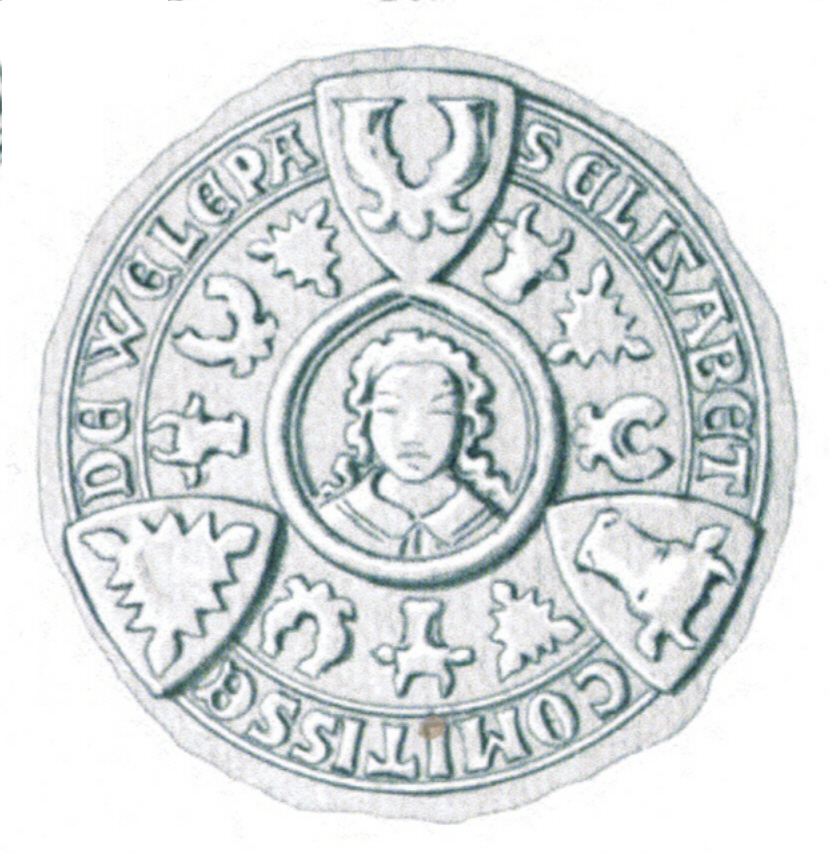
Medieval sigillum of the Adelsgeschlecht von Wölpe of Lower Saxony and the Adelsgeschlecht von Holstein-Itzehoe of Holstein.

=== Duration of records ===
From 1162 to 1269/73 (ending with the death of 'Heinrich [Ritter] von Waneberg'). In 1186, Cuno I von Wahnebergen ('advocatus in Urda [Verda]') was on a list of vassals of the then extinct von Ricklingen noble family, drawn up by a Bishop of Minden. Some records confuse the Edelherren von Wanebergen with the connected but distinct de Monte family (adelsgeschlecht) because the etymology of their respective family names were ostensibly similar (both held vogtei) resulting in a shared, but occasionally differenced, Latinised form in church documents.

=== Feudal dominions & knightly possessions ===
The (unter-)vogtei of Verden (Aller), the Burgfelde(s) or Burgstelle and the Alte Burg erdburg (earth castle) outside central Verden, a tithe from Nieder-Averbergen (sold for 40 marks before 1227), a tithe to Sibudeswerthere (a waived bequest from the Edelherren von Westen), Wahnebergen village, 2 hufen or 60 morgen and 7 more (bailwick) hufen (210 morgen) at Stedesdorf, 2 and a 1/2 tithes from Sibudeswerthere (the 'Werder near Döhlebergen' [includes Sibrandeswerthere]), Altenwerder, 4 hufen or 120 morgen and a mill in Moule/Mölme/Mauloh (a Ricklinger fief), von Diepenau possessions (5 hufen) in Moulme (sold for a settlement of 9 marks) left to Countess Lutchardis von Wa(h)nebergen—Count Volrad von Diepenau's heiress, rights to the Ochtum ('Ochtmund') river in Hannover owned independently by Countess Lutchardis, Norderstedt (an unsuccessful Guelphic installment), episcopal estates in Müßleringen and Röden, and an annuity from the saltworks in Lüneburg left by Bishop Gerhard Graf von Hoya of Verden (1251-1269) to his widowed sister, Countess Ermengard von Wa(h)nebergen.

=== Connected noble families ===
Namely the von Wölpe, von Hoya, vom Berge/de Monte (?), von Ricklingen, von Diepenau, von Hilligsfeld (attribution of Ida de Bergen?), von Westen, von Brockhusen, and von Werpe/Warpke (?).

=== Seat ===
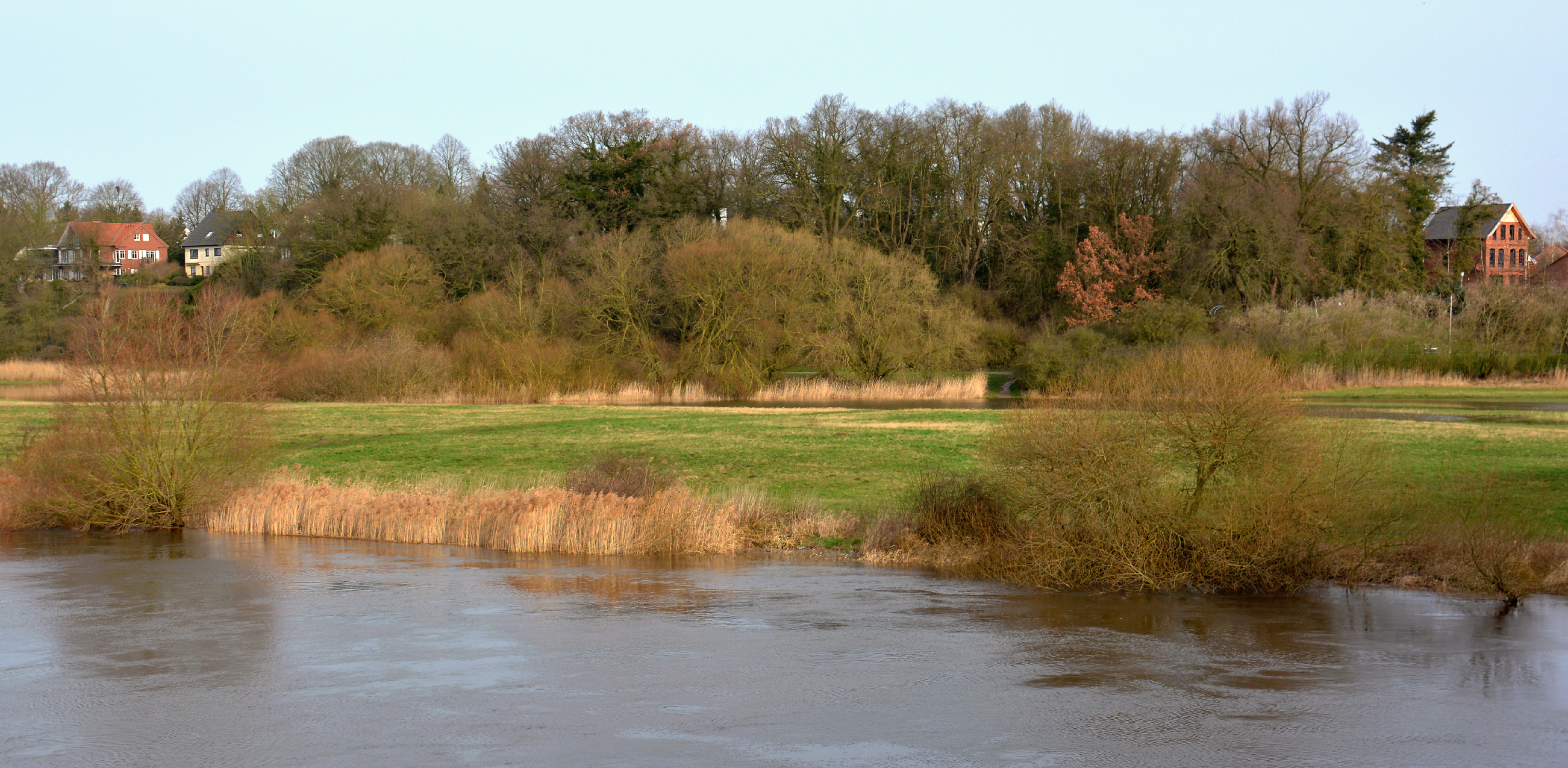
Site of the now lost Alte Burg (old castle) in Verden an der Aller.

An earth castle known as the Alte Burg, a common construction method before 1200, situated on '8 Morgen 27 R' of land stretching from the river banks of the 'Old Aller' river to a section of hills on the outskirts of Verden known then as the Burgfeldes. After a bishop had 4 vineyards cultivated at the old castle, in 1816, a large part of the rampart was pulled down (and some years thereafter, the last part of it) to gain more arable land. And so this Lower Saxon monument of antiquity has almost so completely disappeared that it is now difficult to find even a trace of the old castle on the hills of the old castle field; the railway has also since swallowed up part of the outer embankment with its excavations of earth. The defensive site was walled in such a distinct way and on such a large scale for the time that some writers, perhaps not without reason, assume that it was precisely there where the Frankish king Charlemagne operated from during his Massacre of Verden some time between 782 and 785 during the Saxon Wars.

=== Origin ===
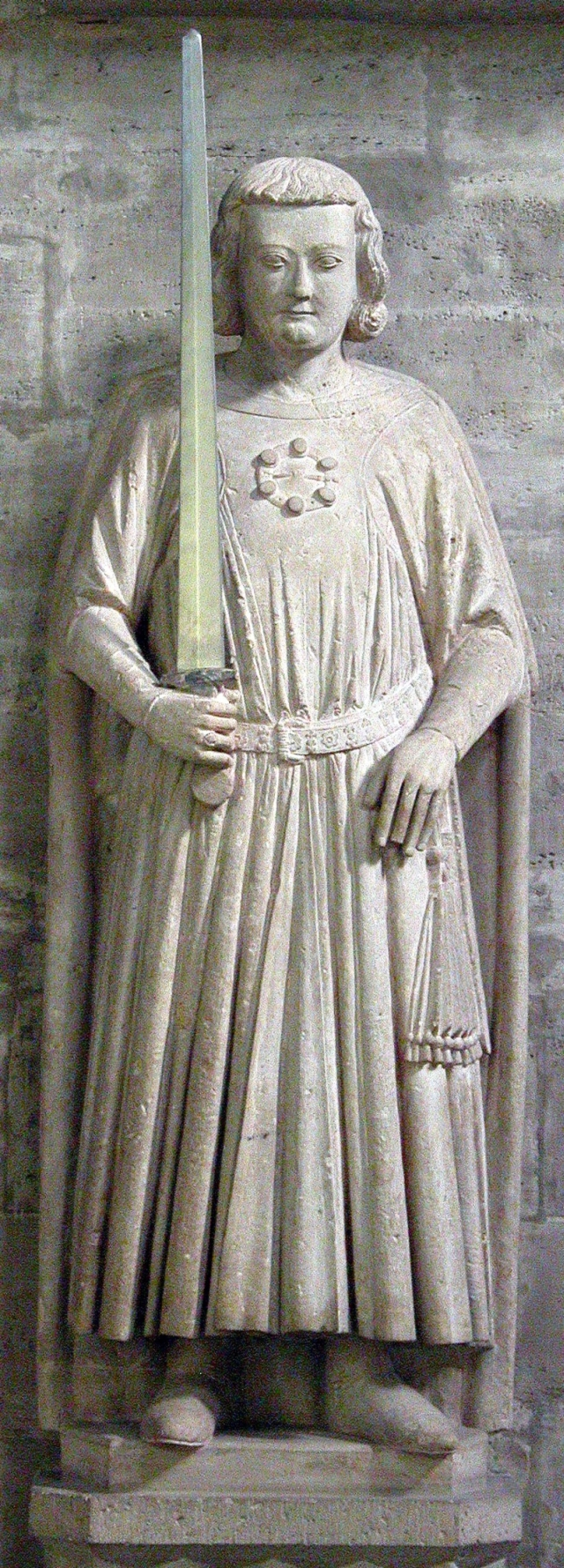
A Henry the Lion statue at Braunschweig Cathedral.

The prevailing theories and conjecture submitted by Ernst Peter Johann Spangenberg, Christoph Gottlieb Pfannkuche, and Wilhelm von Hodenberg suggest that the 'dynasten' von Wa(h)nebergen might have once been 'edelfreies' (free nobles), prior to their becoming Guelphic ministerialen circa 1162, that possibly shared a common descent with the Grafen von Wölpe, Edelherren von Westen, and/or the extinct von Ricklingen noble family—given their morgonatic marriages in the 1200s, as miles (knights) and advocati (vogts), to spouses from prominent noble dynasties of Lower Saxony during the High Middle Ages. Richard Hesse (1900) considers the family to be old nobility of Amt Westen, contemporaneous with the von Westen and von Hilligsfeld dynasties of the area.

== Wanenberg(h)/Wanenberc(h)/Wannenberg of Güstrow & Malchin ==
=== Members ===
- Bürgermeister Joachym Wanenberch (also: Achim Wanenberg), acting mayor of Malchin, Mecklenburg circa 1443
- Ratmann Bandowe Wanenberg (also: Wanenberch), councillor to Güstrow circa 1442
- Knappe Johann von Wanenberg of Hoya (c. 1339), Mecklenburgian nobleman, landowner, and squire of Sarmstorf
- Knappe Heinrich von Wanenberg of Hoya (? [but residing in Güstrow]), Mecklenburgian nobleman, landowner, and squire of Sarmstorf
- Knappe Henneke von Wanenberg (c. 1366), Mecklenburgian nobleman, landowner, and squire of Sarmstorf
- Lord (Domini) NN and Elisabeth von Wanenberg (formerly von Rensow[en] | née von Mikow), Mecklenburgian noblewomen and widow of Ritter (milites) Conrad von Renzow (vassal to Nicolaus, Fürst von Werle [c. 1210–14 May 1277] of the House of Mecklenburg)
- Knappe Kurt von Rensow (c. 1317), son from Elisabeth's ('Ilsebe' or 'Ylsebe') first marriage to Ritter Conrad von Rensow(e).

=== Arms ===
Registered in Güstrow by the brothers Johann and Heinrich von Wanenberg(h) in 1344, it is simply described in vernacular German as follows: '[I]m stehenden Schild eine schräg rechts gestellte Lanzenspitze' (Mecklenburgisches Urkunden: Bd. 1-25, Teil A; 786/1250-1400, Volume 25). Original artefacts ('Wanenbergschen Siegel.—Vgl. Nr. 6246, 6364, 6689') relating to the family arms like wax seals belonging to Johann, Heinrich, and Henneke (and Kurt von Renzow) on parchment ribbons once held at Güstrow's medieval Pfarrkirche St. Marien (St. Mary's Parish Church)—where the Wanenberg(h)s were patrons—can now be found at the Güstrow City Archive (Rostock district, Mecklenburg-Vorpommern). On June 26, 1503, a lightning strike burned the original church down to the ground.

A cover of one of J. Siebmacher's famed wappenbuchs.

=== Duration of records ===
From 1339 to either 1442 or the early 1450s.

== Wannenburg(h) of Amsterdam, Utrecht, & the Cape Colony ==
Pieter Wannenburg(h) of Amsterdam was the first Wannenburgh to settle at the Cape of Good Hope in 1727 during the Dutch East India Company governorship of either Jan de la Fontaine or Pieter Gysbert Noodt (Governors of the Dutch Cape Colony). Dr. Cornelis Pama regarded them as one of the old families of the Cape. The earliest available records digitised by Dutch and Belgian archives via Open Archives' online database inlcludes overlapping entries for the same family members with the alternative or erroneous spellings; 'Wannenberg', 'Wannenbergh', 'Wanenbergh', and 'Wanenberg'. The family is connected through blood and marriage to the following families:

The Frankenoil family (via Johannes de Waal van Amsterdam, his wife's cousin); the regental Eversdijcks of Goes, Zeeland; the Broussons of Nîmes (which include the Seigneurs de Paradès of Gajan, Sauzet, and Fons); the Graaff Baronets of Tygerberg (de Grendal); the knightly von Kotzes of Magdeburg; the Kirst(en) burghers/patriciate of Eberstedt and Rudolstadt; the Mosterts/Mostaerts of Mostert's Mill and 'Welgelegen' farm; and Ireland's Wolfes of Forenaughts, Blackhall, and Baronrath in Naas, County Kildare.

=== Members ===
- Alf Wannenburgh (1936–2010), South African journalist and anti-apartheid activist from Cape Town
- Advocate Walter Hugh Wannenburgh KC, His Majesty's (20th) Attorney General in the Isle of Man (and previously its first Solicitor General [2015])
- John Wannenburgh MHK, Independent Member of The House of Keys for Douglas North, Isle of Man and Associate Member of the British-Irish Parliamentary Assembly
- Adolf Wannenburg (1698–1736), the older brother of Pieter Wannenburg, Dutch Renaissance landscape painter and minor mentor to Tibout Regters
- The family is connected through blood and marriage to the following family:The Frankenoil family (via Johannes de Waal van Amsterdam, his wife's cousin)
- Senator the Hon. Petrus Johannes Wannenburg DTD (born 1852), Member of the Legislative Assembly (MLA) of the First Transvaal Parliament, Fourth Civil Landdrost (Magistrate) at Johannesburg, and a Second Boer War Captain & Adjutant
- Councillor Hendrik Joubert Wannenburg, mayor of Germiston, Gauteng from 1952 to 1953
- Councillor Celeste Wannenburgh, former City of Cape Town councillor and wife of Alf Wannenburgh
- Councillor Dana Wannenburg, Member of the Mayoral Committee (MMC) for Environment and Agriculture Management at City of Tshwane
- Councillor Ben J. Wannenburg, City of Pretoria ward councillor
- Pedrie Johannes Wannenburg (1981–2022), South African rugby union player, former Springbok, and ex-Ulster and Bulls flanker
- Gail Wannenburg, Truth and Reconciliation Commission (TRC) investigator, author, and researcher on Organised Crime in Sub-Sahran Africa.
- Vanessa Wannenburg (Mulholland [married name]), Miss South Africa 1977
- Second lieutenant (1 Recce Rgt) Frederick Gerhardus Wannenburg HCS † (died 1975), recipient of South Africa's Honoris Crux Silver (a military decoration for bravery)
- Advocate Wilko François Wannenburg, lawyer and Oxonian (Oriel College, Oxford)

== Place names ==
=== Germany ===
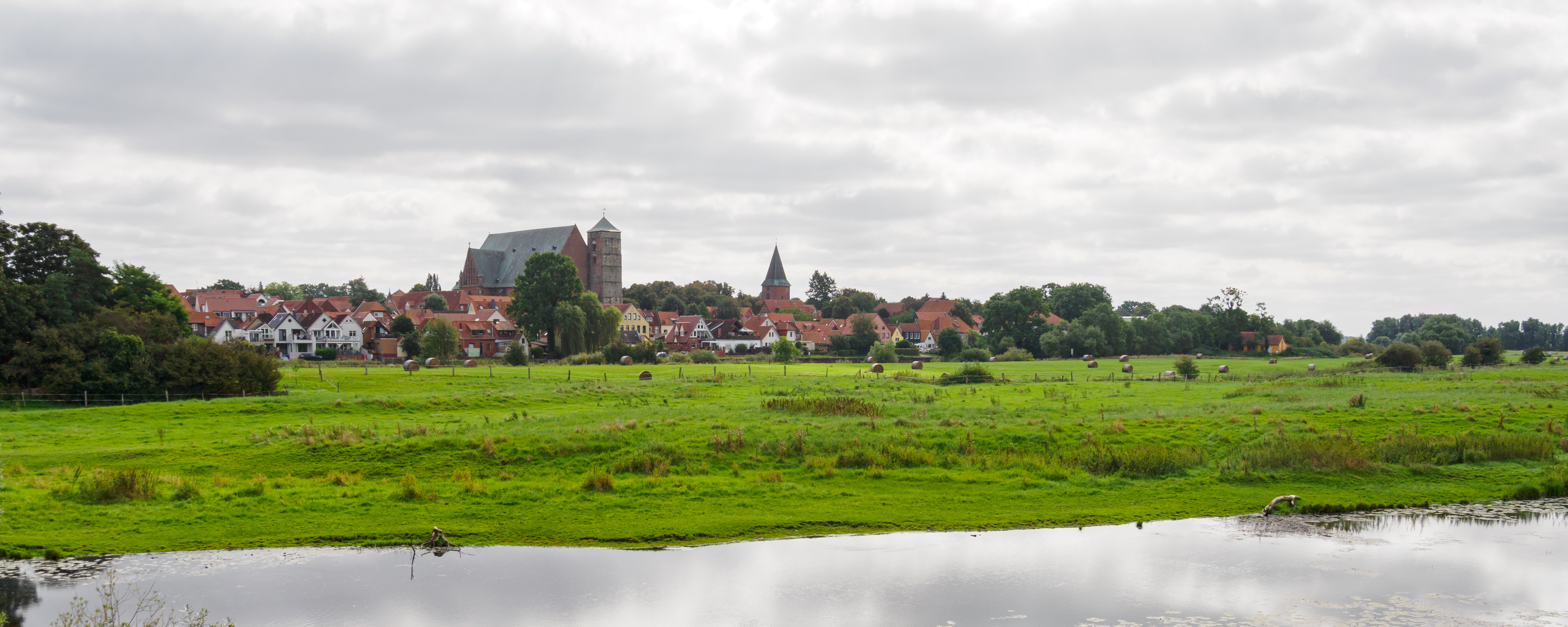
Skyline of Verden an der Aller near Wahnebergen village.

==== Non-natural sites ====
- Wahnebergen (a rural village [part of the former von Wahnebergen knightdom]), 27313, Dörverden, Lower Saxony.
- Wannenberg, 86441, Zusmarshausen, Bavaria.
- Wannenberg, 86482, Aystetten, Bavaria.
- Wannenbergweg, 86688, Marxheim, Bavaria.
- Wannenbergweg, 73312, Geislingen an der Steige, Baden-Württemberg.
- Wannenbergweg, 89294, Oberroth, Bavaria.
- Wannenbergstraße, 79771, Klettgau, Baden-Württemberg.
- Wannenbergstraße, 79801, Hohentengen am Hochrhein, Baden-Württemberg.
- Sender Wannenberg (radio broadcaster), 79771, Klettgau, Baden-Württemberg.
- Am Unteren Wannenberg, 86655, Harburg (Swabia), Baden-Württemberg.
- Am Oberen Wannenberg, 86655, Harburg (Swabia), Baden-Württemberg.

==== Mountains ====
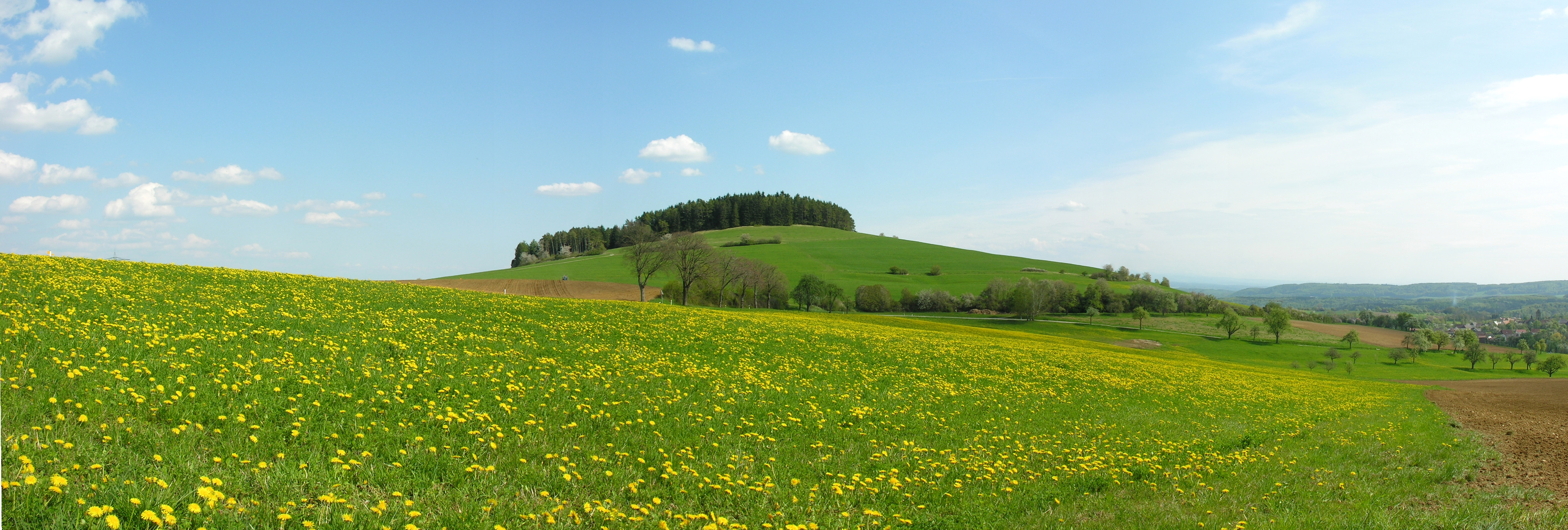
The Wannenberg outside Tengen.

- Wannenberg (mountain peak), 79801, Hohentengen am Hochrhein, Baden-Württemberg.
- Wannenberg (mountain peak), 74226, Nordheim, Baden-Württemberg.
- Am Wannenberg (mountain peak), 78250, Tengen, Baden-Württemberg.
- Am Wannenberg (mountain peak), 79356, Eichstetten am Kaiserstuhl, Baden-Württemberg.

==== Districts ====
- Wannenberg, Aulendorf (a town), Ravensburg (district), Baden-Württemberg.

=== The Netherlands ===
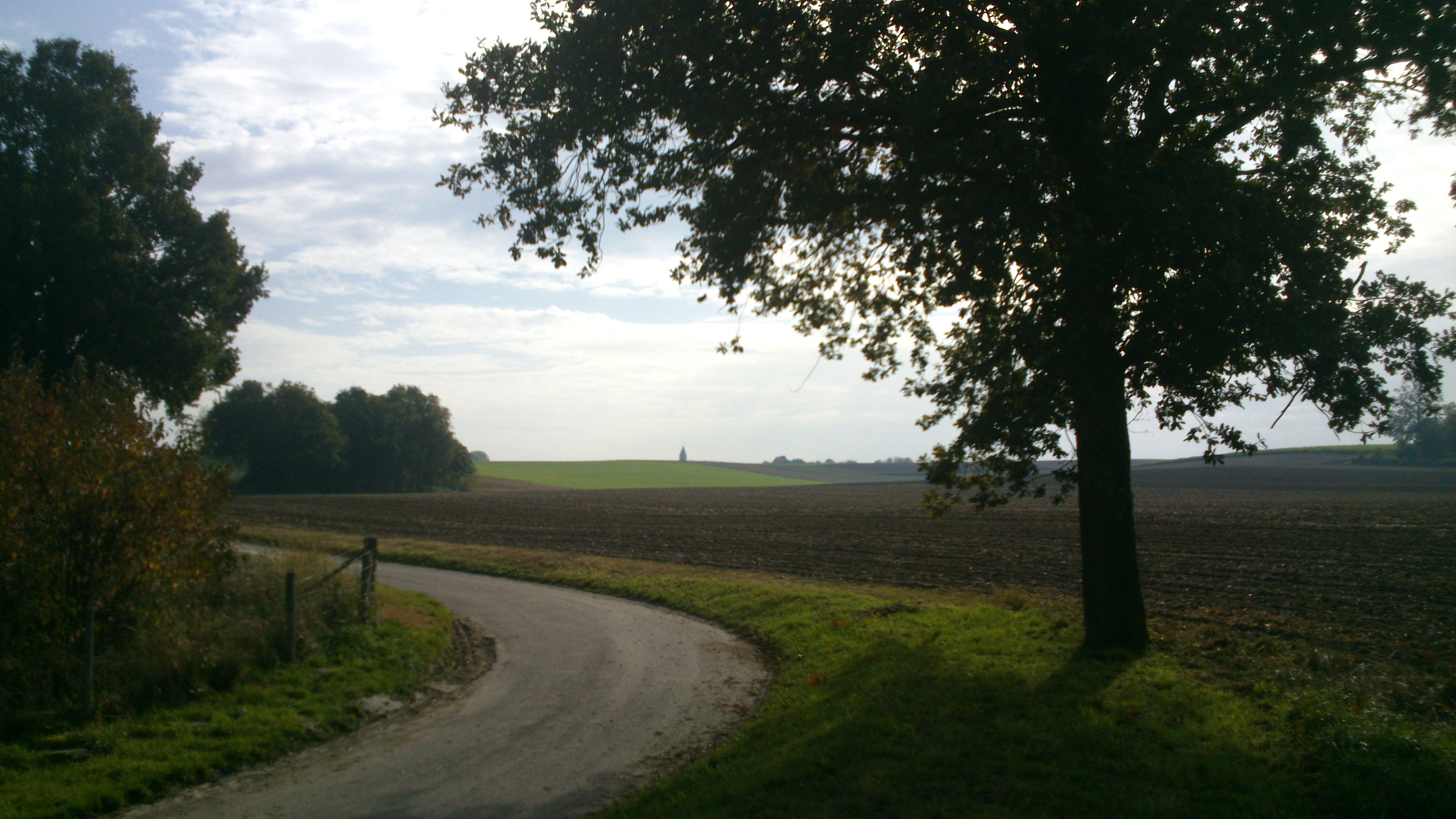
Wanenberg hill (100 meters above NAP) located between the towns of Munstergeleen, Windraak, and Puth.

- Wanenberg (scenic spot), Munstergeleen, Netherlands.

=== South Africa ===
- Wannenburghoogte (in honour of mayor Cllr. Hendrik Joubert Wannenburg of Germiston), a suburb in Germiston, 1401, Gauteng.
- Wannenburg Street (in honour of mayor Cllr. H. J. Wannenburg of Germiston), Witfield, Boksburg, 1459, Gauteng.
- Wannenburg Street (in honour of Senator the Hon. Petrus Johannes Wannenburg), Brandwag, Bloemfontein, 9301, Free State.

== Fictional characters ==
- Boy Wannenburg, a character in Karin Brynard's Homeland (2018)
- Von Wannenberg family (Fredrik, Julie, Joachim, Max, and Robert), characters in Walter Hülphers Den heliga elden: fem händelser (1912 [in Swedish])
