= History of Gouda, South Holland =

Aspect of Dutch history

The history of Gouda describes the development of Gouda from a small fortified settlement at the confluence of the Hollandse IJssel and Gouwe in the Dutch province of South Holland around 1300 into a medium-sized provincial town in the 21st century.

== Earliest history ==
Little is known about the history of occupation in the area before 1000. Some sparse foundations point to occupation in Roman times. What exactly that looked like is unknown. Presumably there were one or more agricultural settlements in the area near the Gouwe (the current Bloemendaal district). Probably these ended in the late third century, partly because the environment became wetter. Archaeological research in 2005 found four Roman shards and posts made of alder wood from Roman times along the Gouderaksedijk. Around 1000 CE what is now Gouda was soggy and covered with swampy forest and peat rivers such as the Gouwe. Peat extraction took place east (Haastrecht) and west (Moordrecht) of Gouda in the 11th century. Mining along the banks of the Gouwe (Bloemendaal and Korte Akkeren, including the area of the current city center) also began.
