= Opmeer =

- Municipality
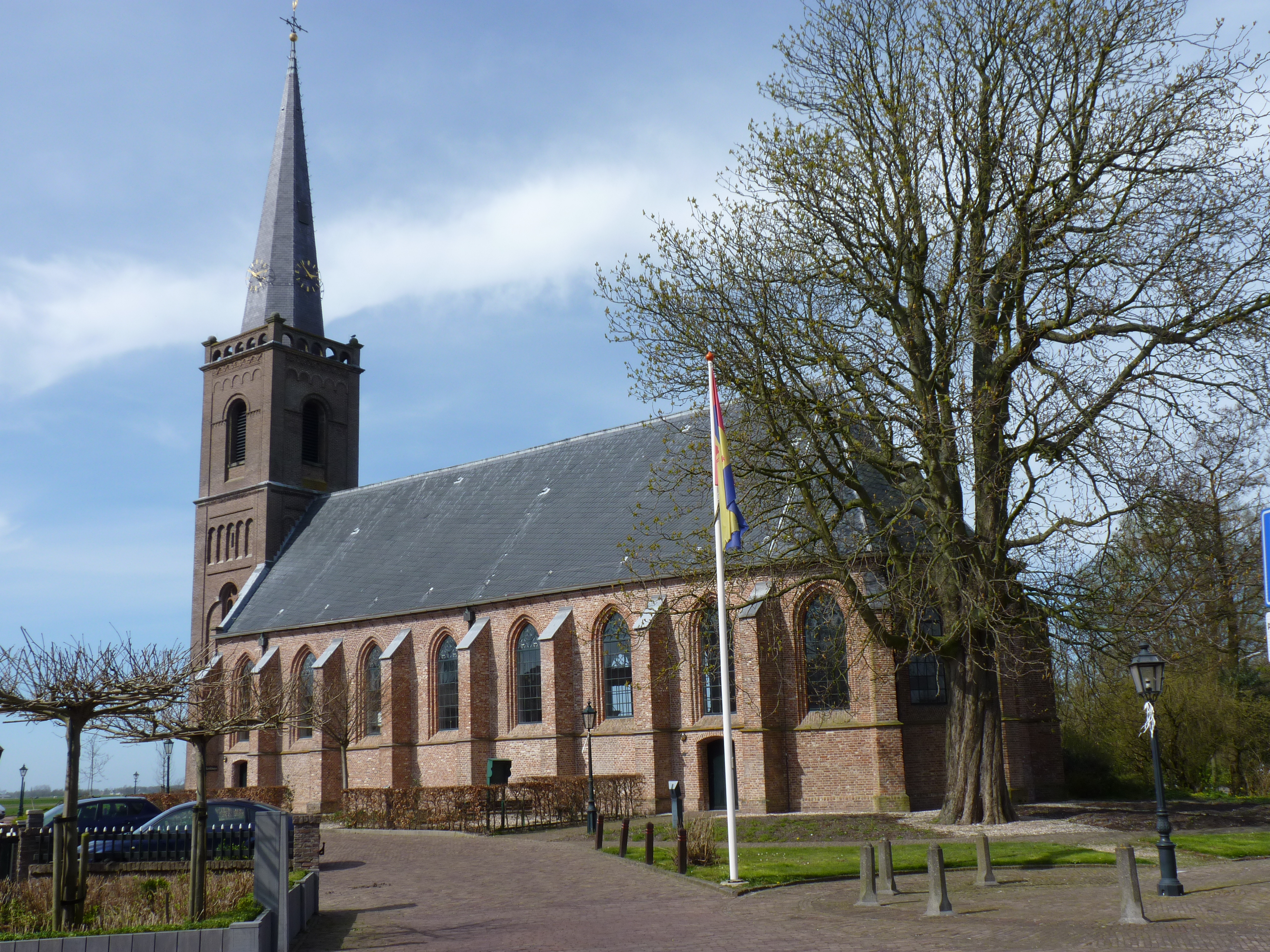
- Church in Spanbroek

- Flag Coat of arms

- Location in North Holland
- Coordinates: 52°42′N 4°57′E
- Country: Netherlands
- Province: North Holland

Government
  - Body: Municipal council
  - Mayor: Herman Wiersema (PvdA)

Area
  - Total: 41.94 km^{2} (16.19 sq mi)
  - Land: 41.50 km^{2} (16.02 sq mi)
  - Water: 0.44 km^{2} (0.17 sq mi)
- Elevation: 0 m (0 ft)

Population (January 2021)
  - Total: 12,009
  - Density: 289/km^{2} (750/sq mi)
- Demonym: Opmeerder
- Time zone: UTC+1 (CET)
  - Summer (DST): UTC+2 (CEST)
- Postcode: 1660–1663, 1715–1719
- Area code: 0226, 0229
- Website: www.opmeer.nl

Opmeer (Dutch pronunciation: [ɔpˈmeːr]; West Frisian: Opmar or Obmar) is a municipality and town in the Netherlands, in the province of North Holland and the region of West-Frisia.

== Population centres ==
The municipality of Opmeer consists of the following settlements:

- Aartswoud
- De Weere
- Gouwe
- Hoogwoud
- Opmeer
- Spanbroek
- Wadway
- Zandwerven

=== Topography ===
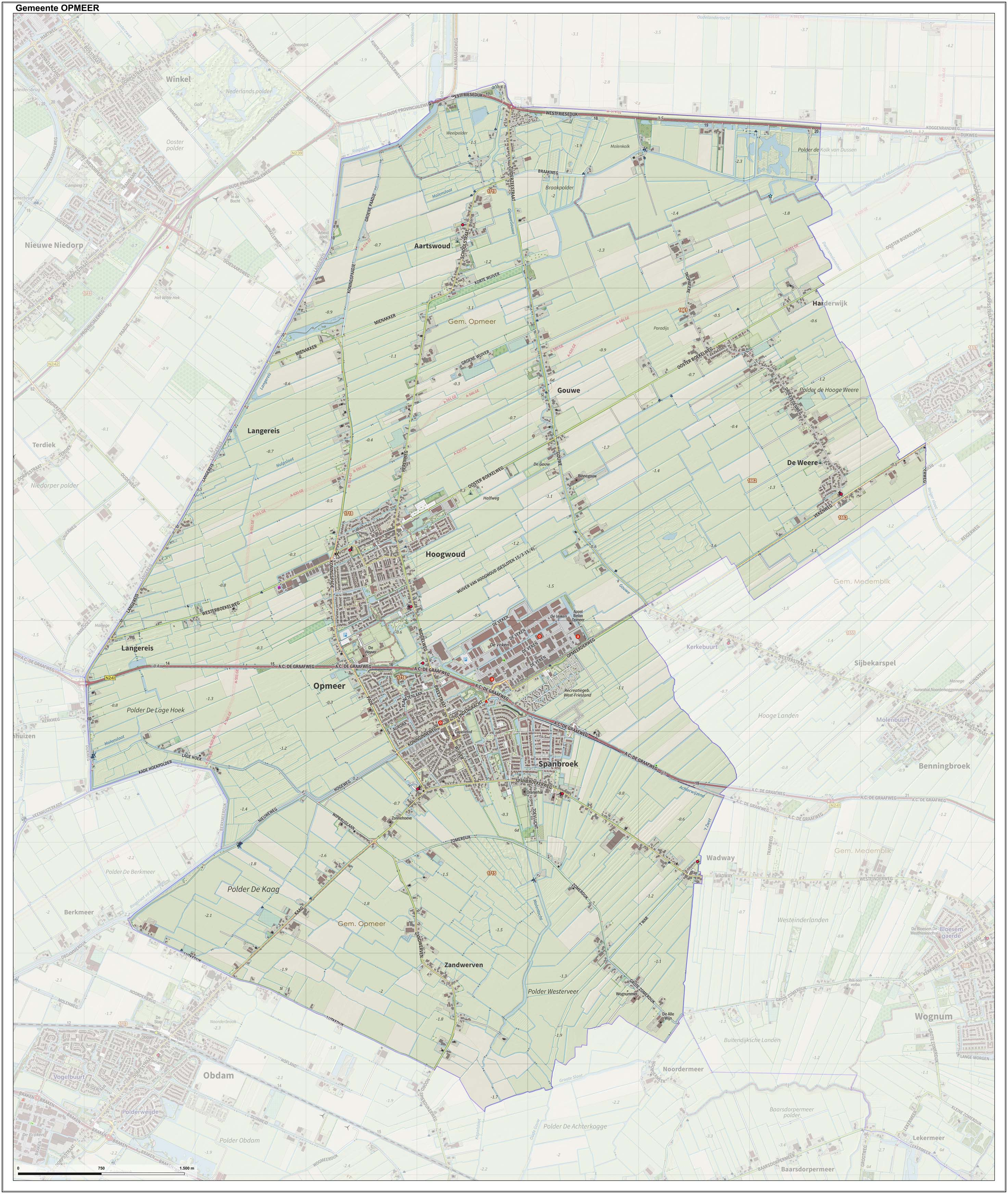
Map of the municipality of Opmeer, June 2015

== Local government ==
The municipal council of Opmeer consists of 15 seats, which at the 2026 municipal elections divided as follows:

- KERN8 - 3 seats
- CDA - 3 seats
- VVD - 3 seats
- Gemeentebelangen Opmeer - 2 seats
- Lokale Partij Opmeer(LPO) - 2 seats
- GroenLinks/PvdA (PRO) - 2 seats

The CDA, VVD and PRO are in a coalition government.

The town has an online portal with information on services and news.

== Notable people ==
- Hendrik Bosch (1776 in Spanbroek – 1864) a military officer and colonial government official on the Dutch Gold Coast
- Johan Carel Marinus Warnsinck (1882 in Hoogwoud – 1943) a naval officer and naval historian
- Albert Langereis (1888 in Hoogwoud – 1966) a sports shooter, competed in two events at the 1924 Summer Olympics
- Jan Agema (1919 in Opmeer – 2011) Civil engineer, professor at Delft University of Technology and involved in the design and construction of the Delta Works
- Robert Slippens (born 1975 in Opmeer) a Dutch racing cyclist, competed in three Summer Olympics

== Gallery ==
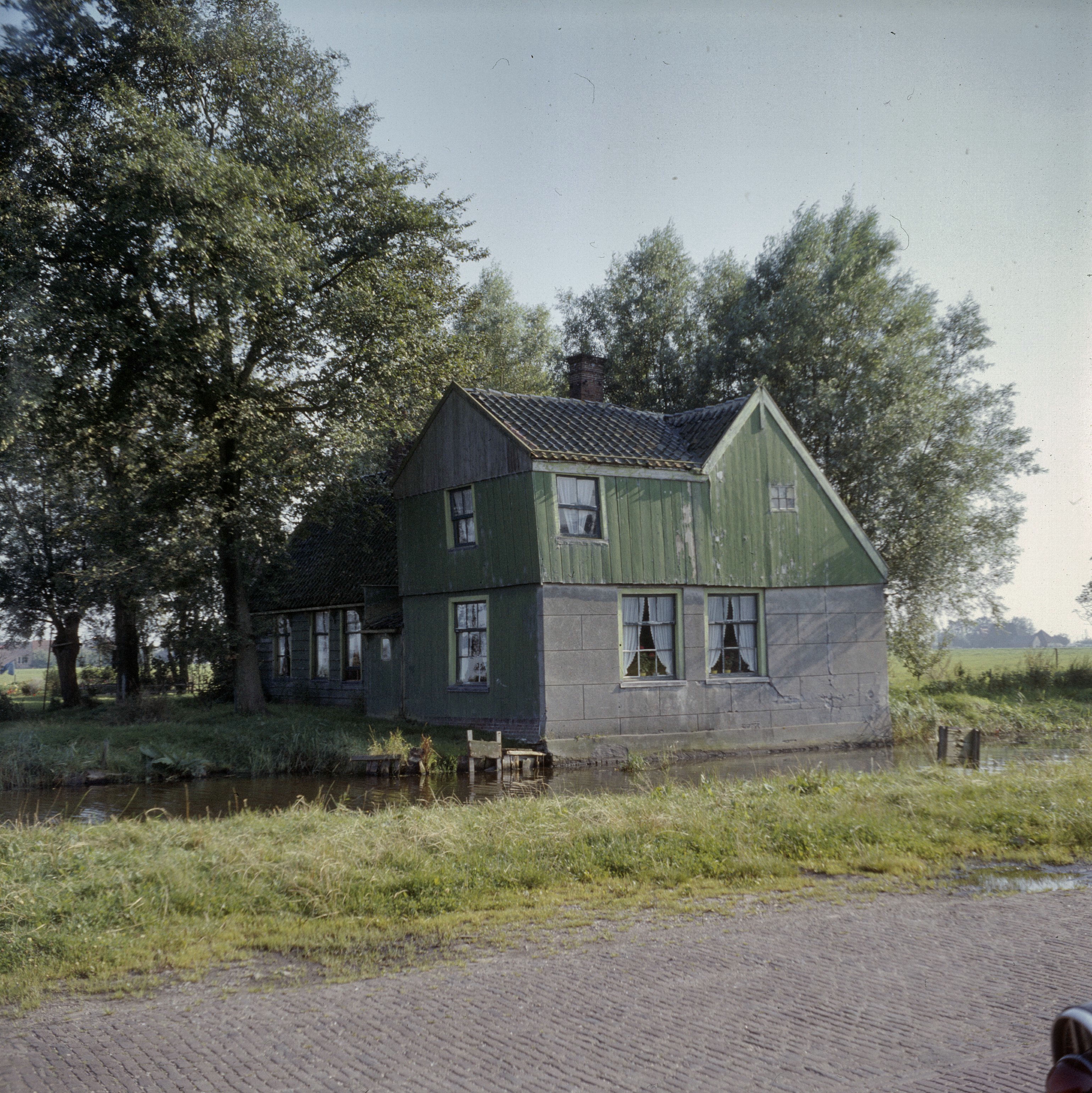
Former mayor's residence, Opmeer

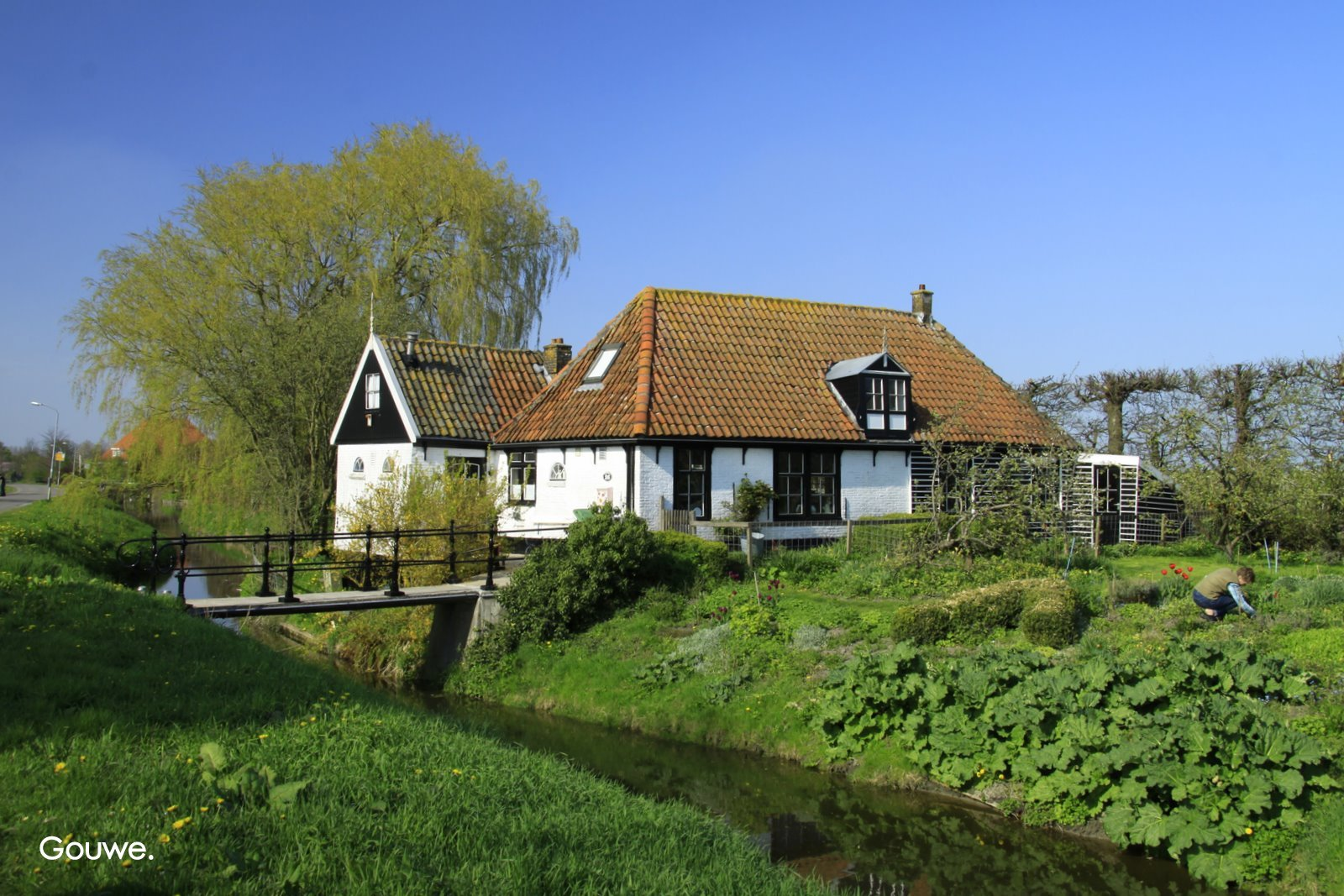
Gouwe, village near Opmeer

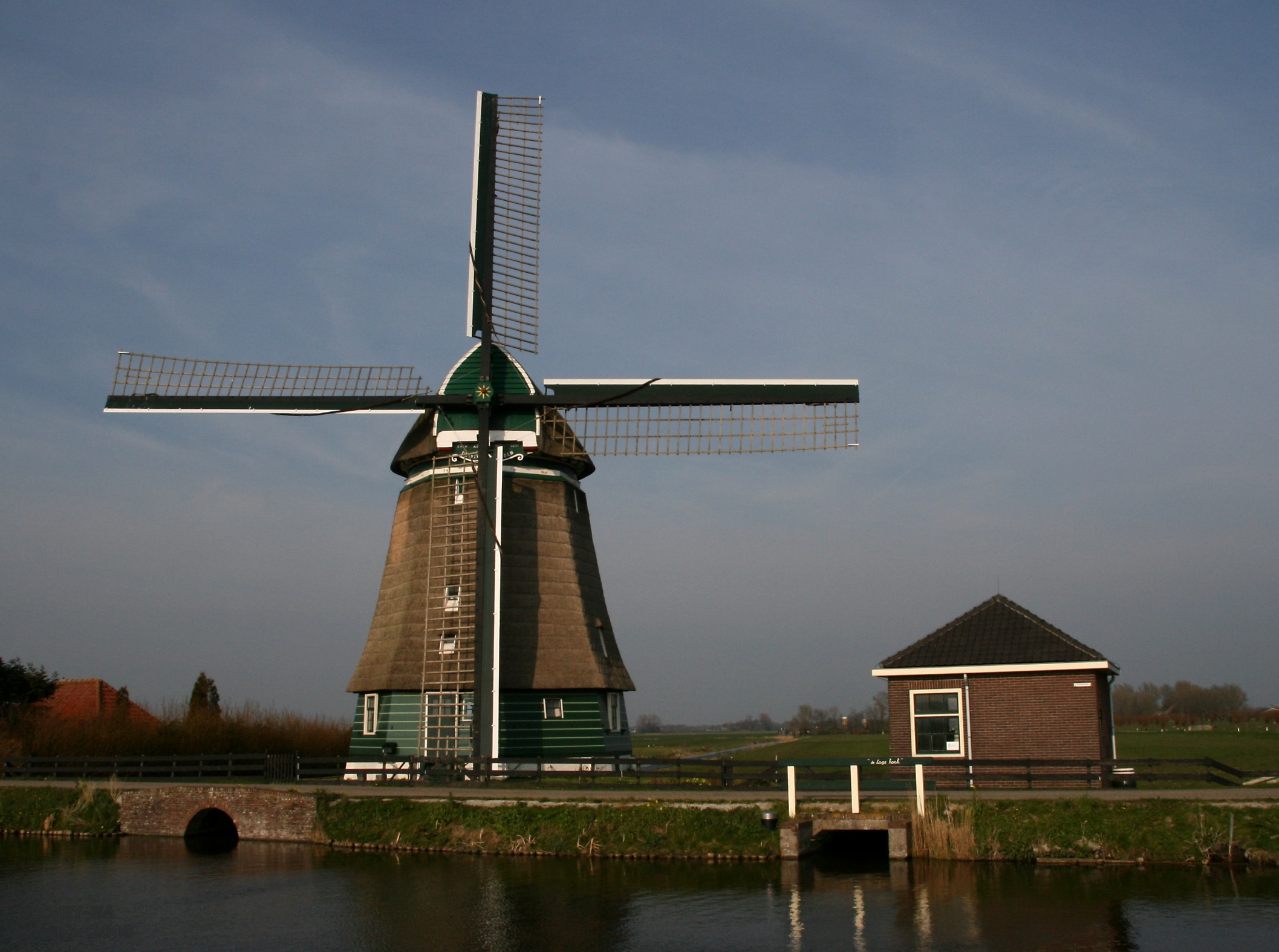
De Vier Winden Mill with pumping station, Hoogwoud

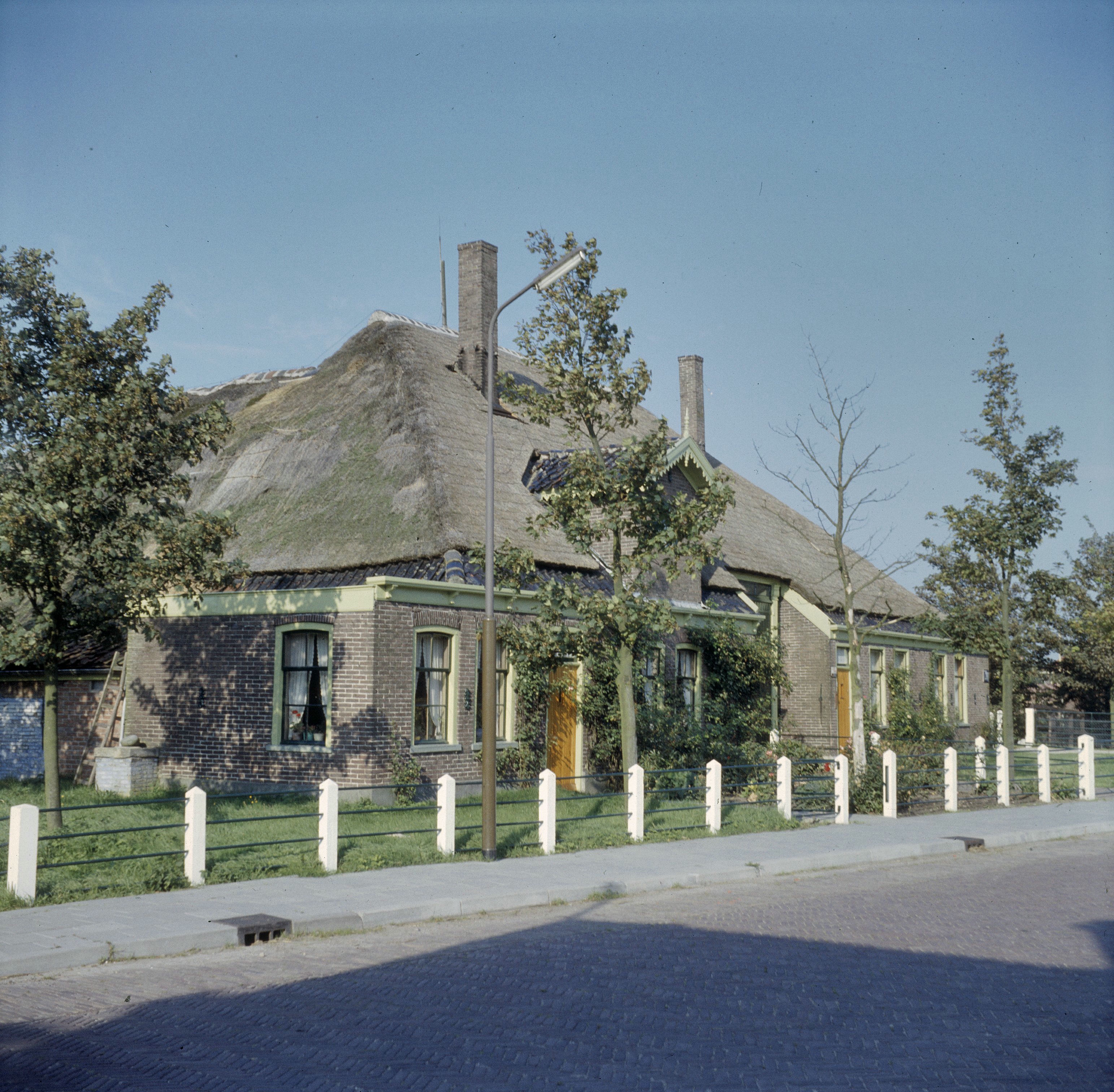
Farmhouse, Spanbroek
