= Zandwerven =

- Hamlet
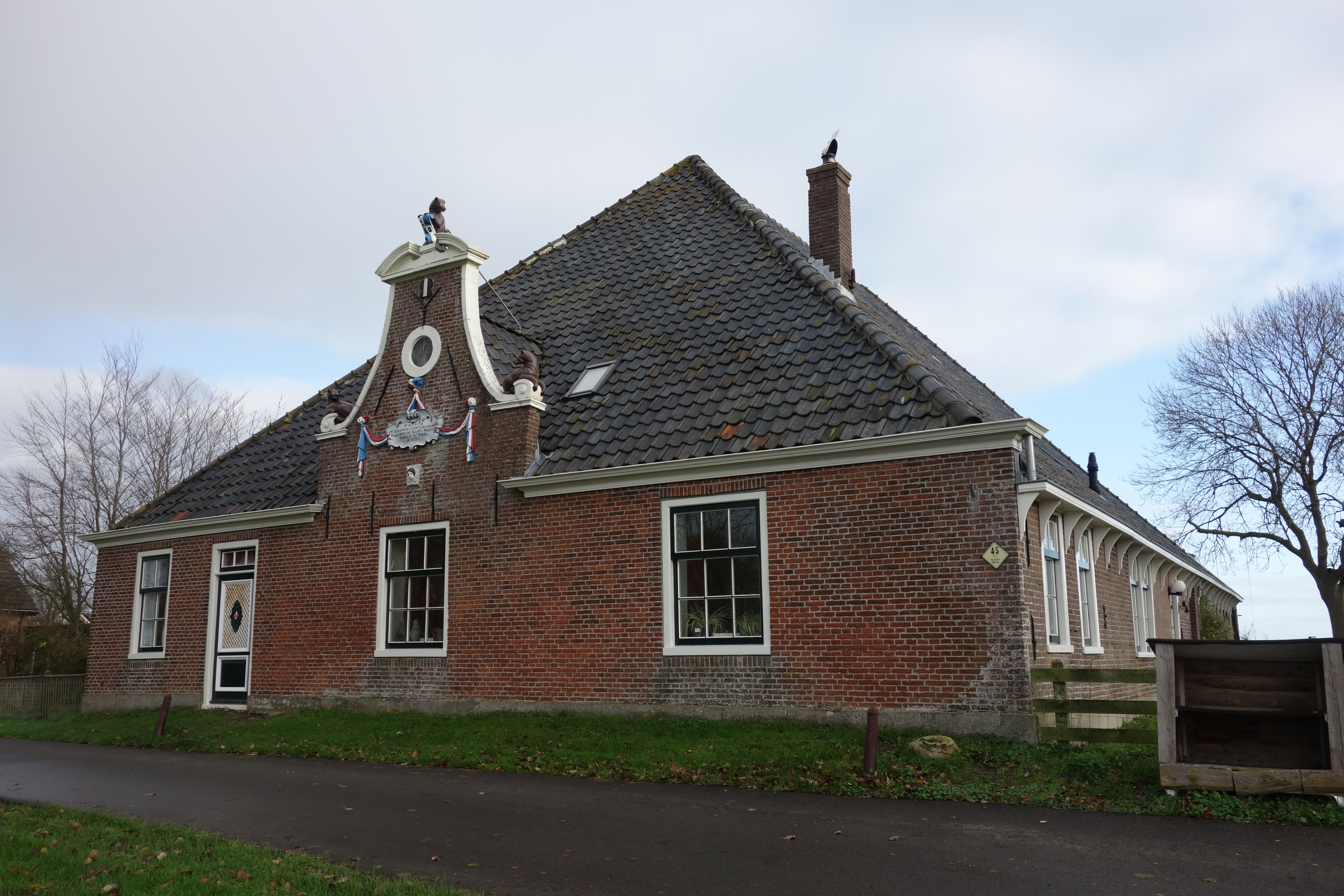
- Farm in Zandwerven

- Location in the Netherlands Location in the province of North Holland in the Netherlands
- Coordinates: 52°41′N 4°57′E
- Country: Netherlands
- Province: North Holland
- Municipality: Opmeer

Area
  - Total: 2.79 km^{2} (1.08 sq mi)
- Elevation: −0.4 m (−1.3 ft)

Population (2025)
  - Total: 110
  - Density: 39/km^{2} (100/sq mi)
- Time zone: UTC+1 (CET)
  - Summer (DST): UTC+2 (CEST)
- Postal code: 1715
- Dialing code: 0226

Zandwerven (West Frisian: Sandwerfen) is a hamlet in the Dutch province of North Holland. It is a part of the municipality of Opmeer, and lies about 8 km east of Heerhugowaard.

The hamlet was first mentioned in 1653 as "op Sandwerven", and means "terp (artificial living hill) on the sand". Zandwerven is the site of a Neolithic settlement, and artefacts have been recovered from 1,700 Before Christ.

Zandwerven has place name signs. It was home to 108 people in 1840.
