= Wadway =

- Village
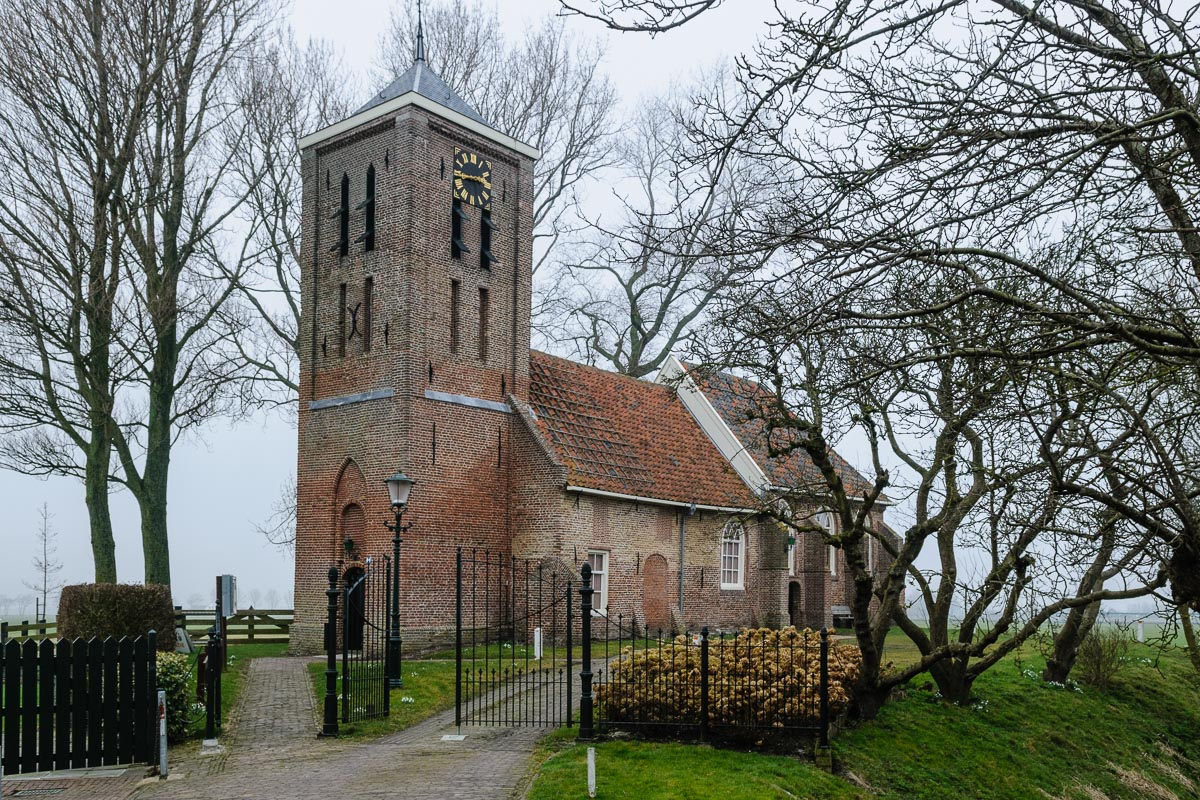
- Theatre church

- Location in the Netherlands Location in the province of North Holland in the Netherlands
- Coordinates: 52°41′30″N 4°58′47″E
- Country: Netherlands
- Province: North Holland
- Municipality: Opmeer; Medemblik

Area
  - Total: 2.55 km^{2} (0.98 sq mi)
- Elevation: −0.4 m (−1.3 ft)

Population (2025)
  - Total: 270
  - Density: 110/km^{2} (270/sq mi)
- Time zone: UTC+1 (CET)
  - Summer (DST): UTC+2 (CEST)
- Postal code: 1715
- Dialing code: 0226

Wadway (West Frisian: Wadwei) is a village in the Dutch province of North Holland. It is a part of the municipality of Opmeer and Medemblik. It is located about 7 km northwest of Hoorn.

The village was first mentioned in 1256 as Waddeweye, and means "road" and "fordable place". Wadway declared its independence in 1796, and is nicknamed Republiek. Wadway was home to 100 people in 1840.

The former Dutch Reformed church is a single aisled church. The tower was built around 1450. It started to deteriorate in the 20th century, and was used a stable for sheep by a farmer. In 1966, the church was bought by Stichting Wadway. It was restored and opened in 1969 as a theatre church.
