= Hoogwoud =

- Small city
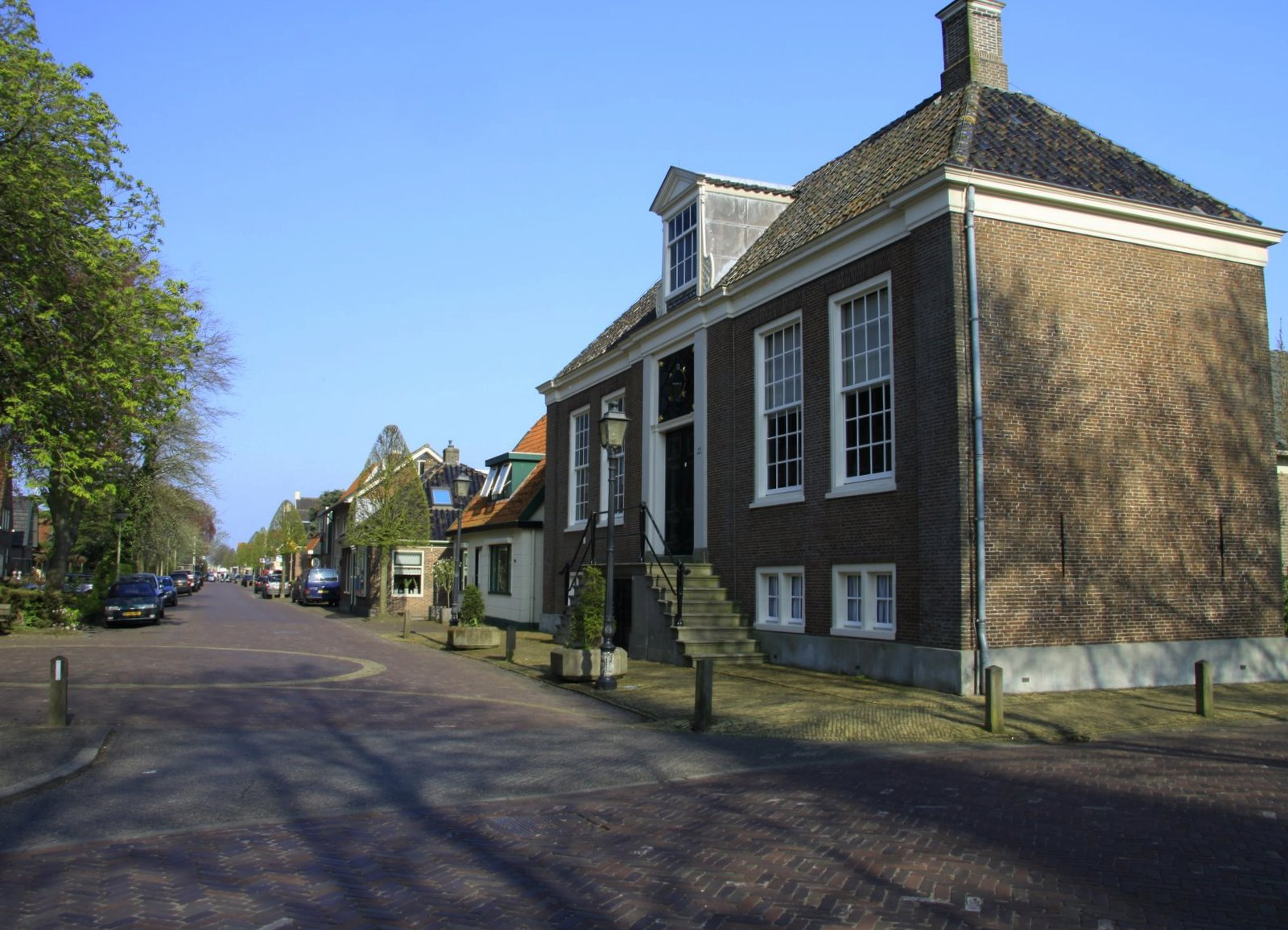
- Hoogwoud in 2014

- Flag Coat of arms

- Location in the Netherlands Location in the province of North Holland in the Netherlands
- Coordinates: 52°42′55″N 4°56′12″E
- Country: Netherlands
- Province: North Holland
- Municipality: Opmeer

Area
  - Total: 5.71 km^{2} (2.20 sq mi)
- Elevation: −0.4 m (−1.3 ft)

Population (2025)
  - Total: 3,585
  - Density: 628/km^{2} (1,630/sq mi)
- Time zone: UTC+1 (CET)
  - Summer (DST): UTC+2 (CEST)
- Postal code: 1718
- Dialing code: 0226

Hoogwoud (Dutch pronunciation: [ˈɦoːxʋʌut]; West Frisian: Hougwoud) is a small city in the Dutch province of North Holland. It is a part of the municipality of Opmeer, and lies about 9 kilometres (5.6 mi) northeast of Heerhugowaard.

== History ==
Hoogwoud was first mentioned in 1289 as Officii de Alta Silua, and means "high forest". According to legend, Redbad, King of the Frisians was baptised in Hoogwoud in 718 by Wulfram of Sens. Hoogwoud developed in the Middle Ages as a peat excavation settlement. Hoogwoud received city rights in 1414. The medieval castle was demolished around 1700.

The Dutch Reformed church is wide single aisled church with a needle spire. The bottom of the tower dates from shortly after 1472. It received its current height in 1886. The Catholic St Johannes Geboorte Church is a three aisled basilica-like church between 1863 and 1865 and designed by Th. Molkenboer. His son W.B.G. Molkenboer designed the tower in 1865.

The polder mill De Lage Hoek was built in 1891. In 1942, a pumping station was installed next to the windmill. It was restored between 1972 and 1973 and is frequently in service.

Hoogwoud was home to 165 people in 1840. It was a separate municipality until 1979, when it was merged with Opmeer.

== Geography ==
Hoogwoud is located in middle of the municipality of Opmeer in the province of North Holland in the Netherlands. It is situated north of the population centers of Opmeer and Spanbroek.

== Gallery ==
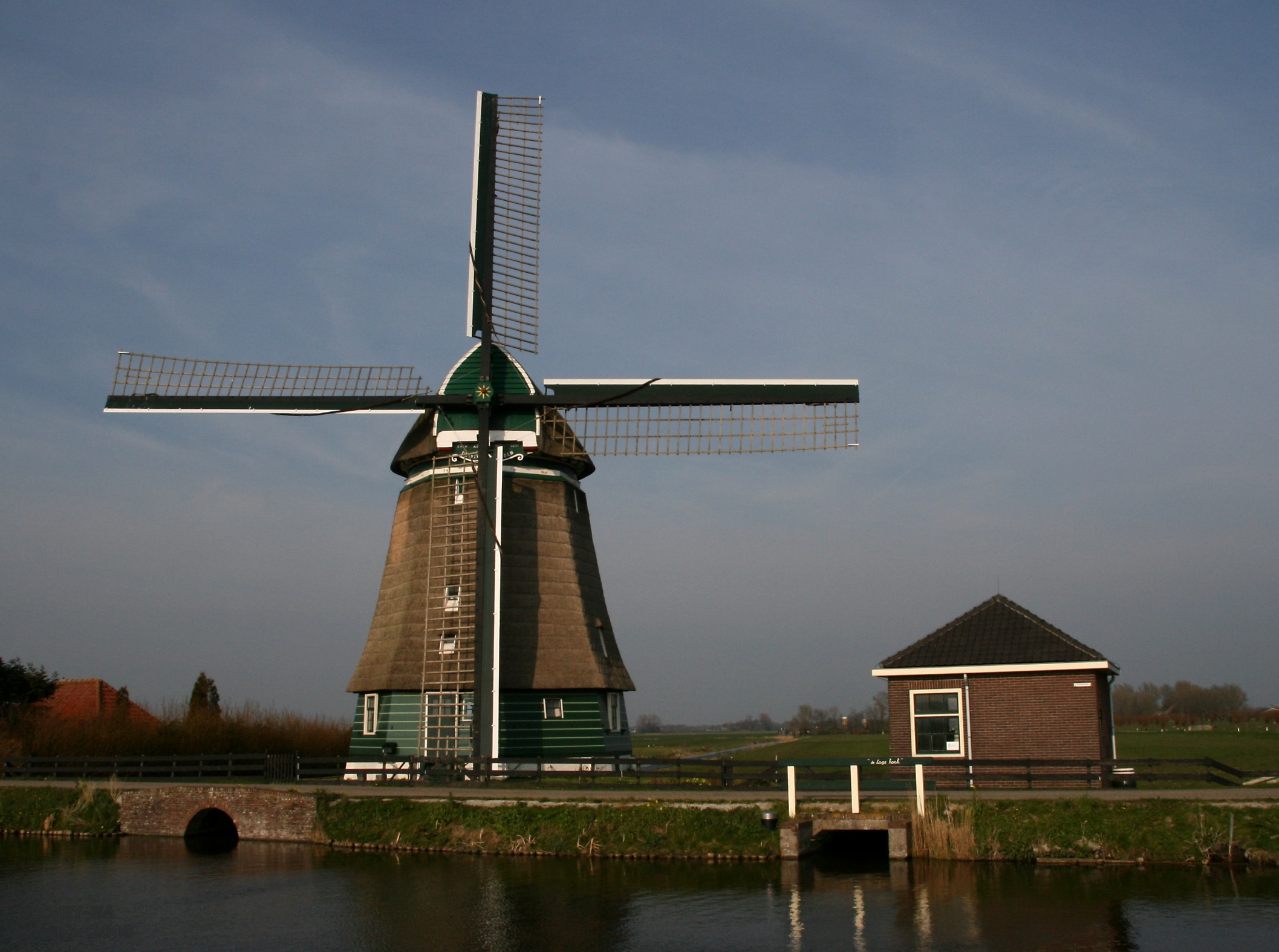
Windmill De Lage Hoek with pumping station

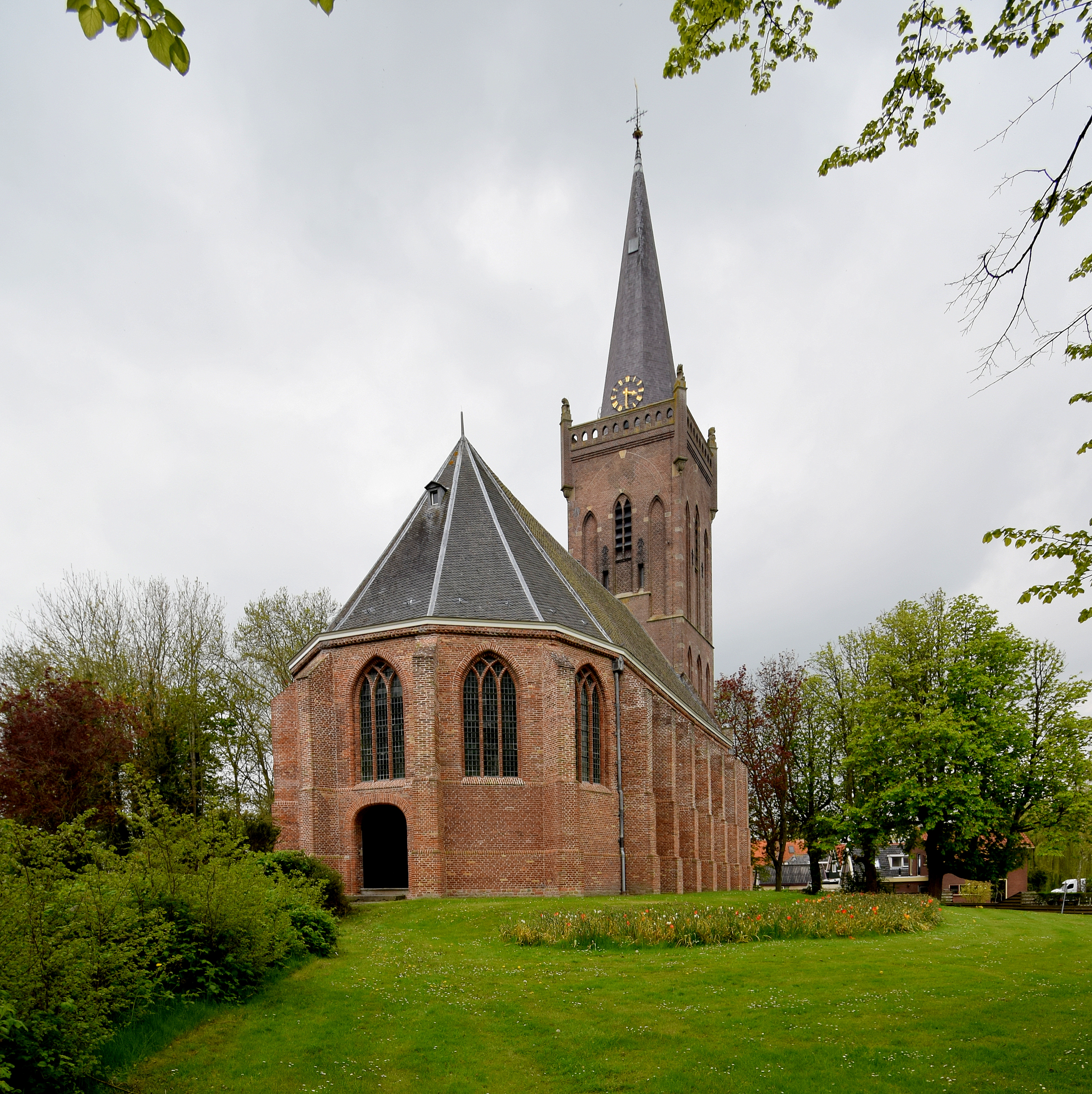
Dutch Reformed church

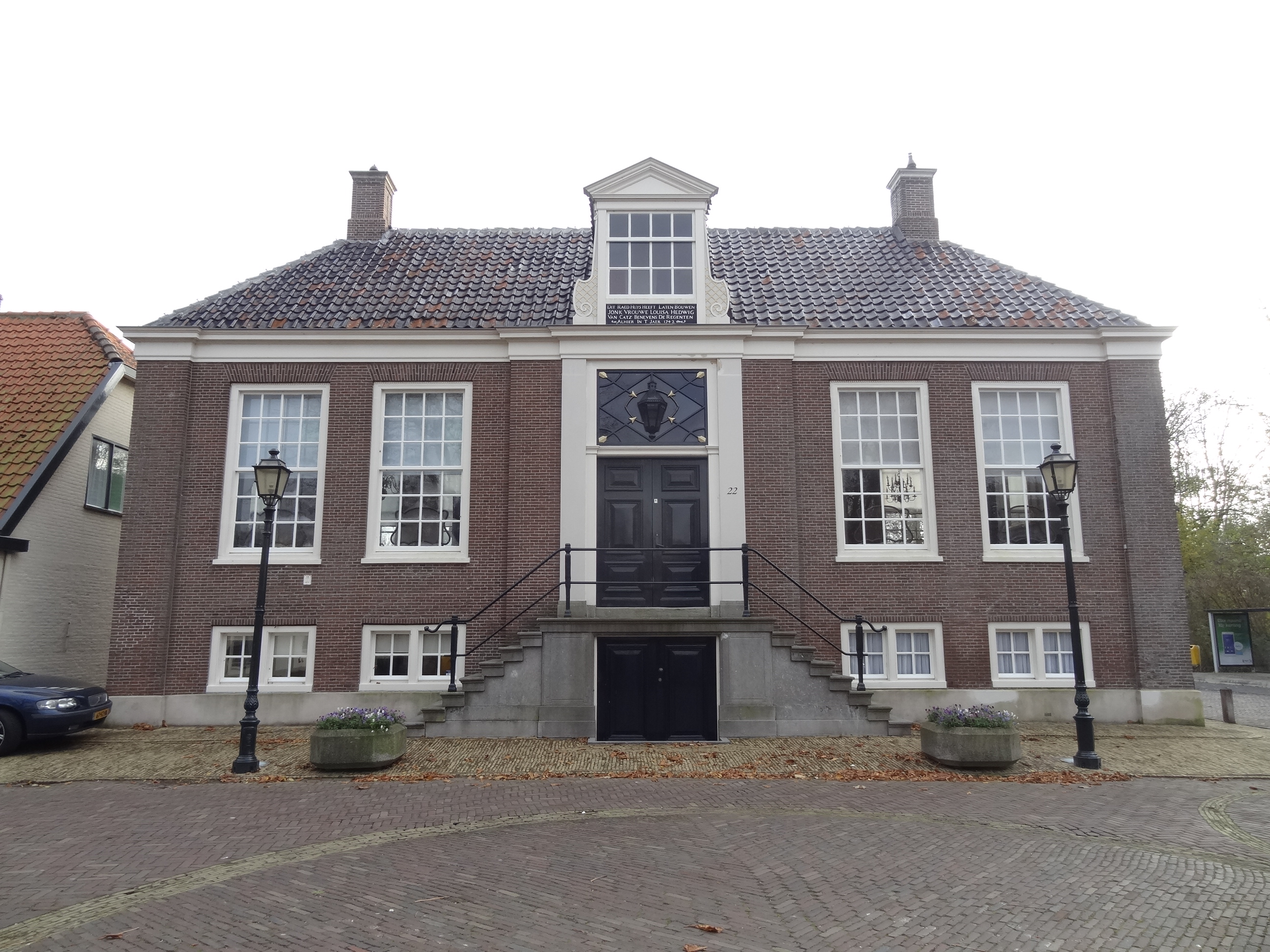
Former town hall

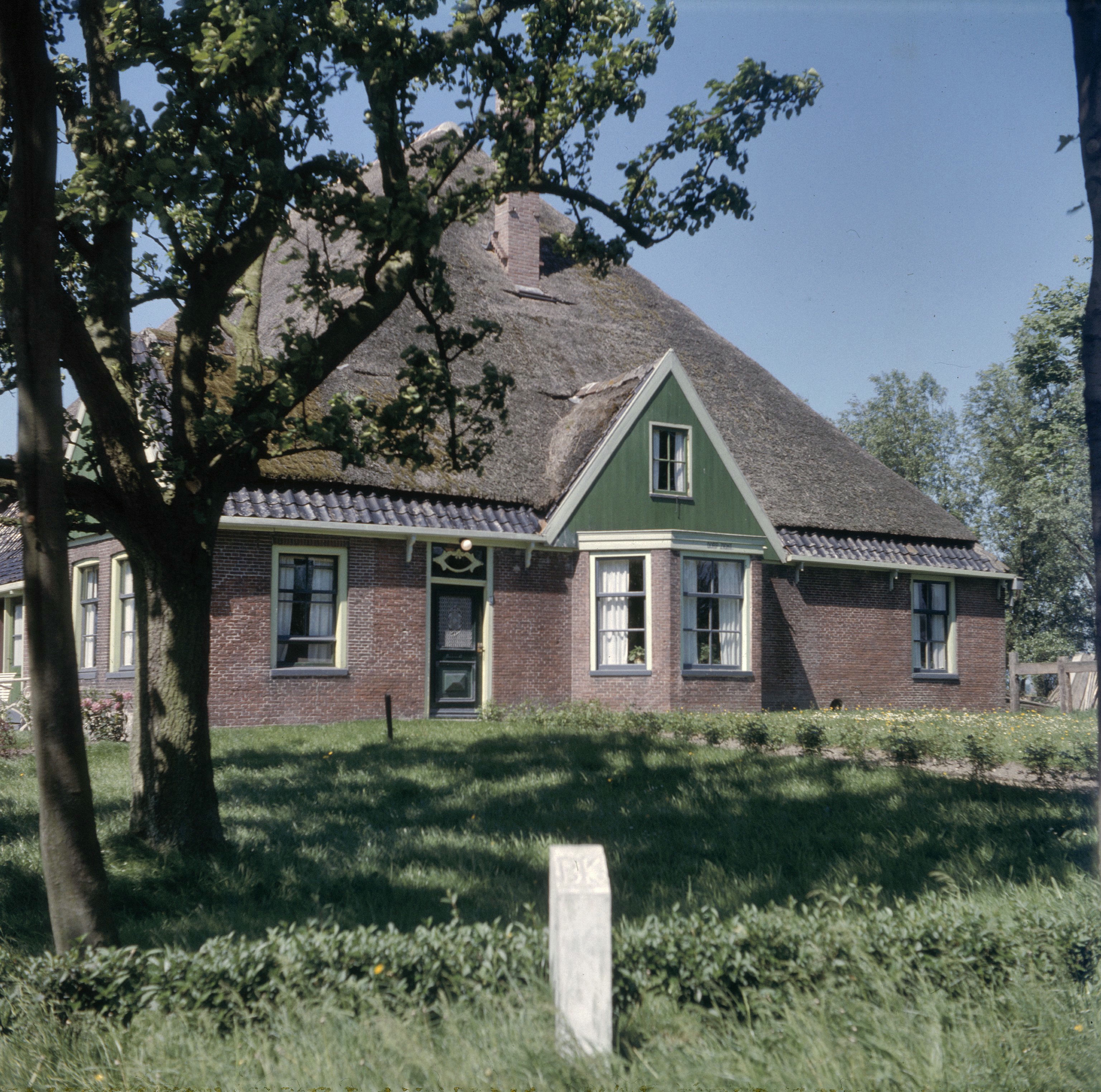
Farm in Hoogwoud
