= Albert Langereis =

Dutch sports shooter

Personal information
- Born: 13 July 1888 Hoogwoud, Netherlands
- Died: 13 January 1966 (aged 77) Amsterdam, Netherlands

Sport
- Sport: Sports shooting

Albert Langereis (13 July 1888 – 13 January 1966) was a Dutch sports shooter. He competed in two events at the 1924 Summer Olympics.
