= De Weere, Opmeer =

De Weere
- Village
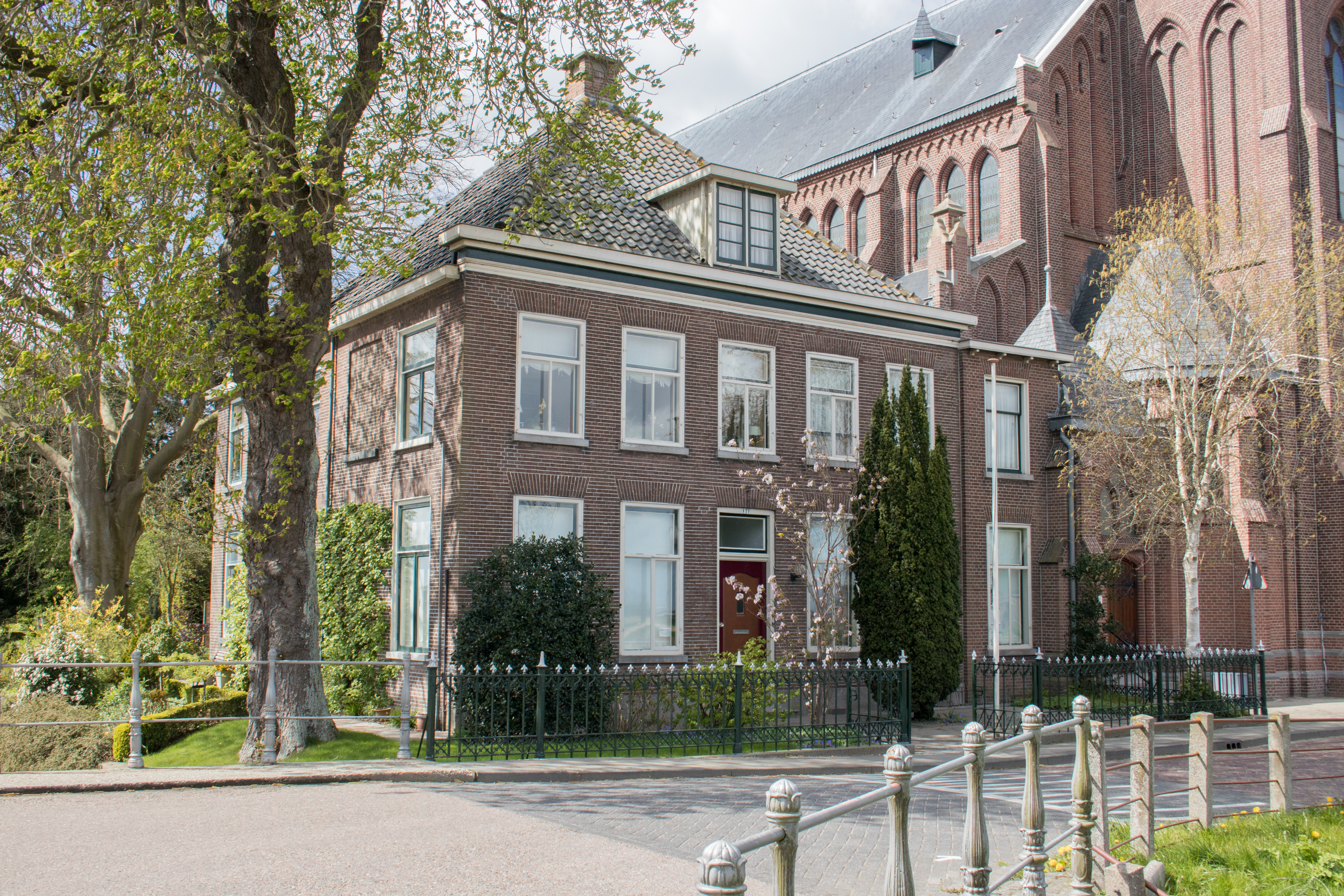
- Clergy house

- Location in the Netherlands Location in the province of North Holland in the Netherlands
- Coordinates: 52°43′22″N 4°59′55″E
- Country: Netherlands
- Province: North Holland
- Municipality: Opmeer

Area
  - Total: 6.44 km^{2} (2.49 sq mi)
- Elevation: −1.3 m (−4.3 ft)

Population (2025)
  - Total: 835
  - Density: 130/km^{2} (336/sq mi)
- Time zone: UTC+1 (CET)
  - Summer (DST): UTC+2 (CEST)
- Postal code: 1661
- Dialing code: 0229

De Weere (West Frisian: De Weare) is a village in the Dutch province of North Holland. It is a part of the municipality of Opmeer, and lies about 10 km northwest of Hoorn.

The village was first mentioned in 1680 as De Weeren, and means "enclosed land". It refers to the ditches which enclose the polder.

The Catholic St Lambertus Church was built between 1905 and 1907. In 1963, exterminators tried to remove longhorn beetles using gasoline, and the church burnt down. The damage was repaired by December 1964.

De Weere was home to 526 people in 1840. It used to belong to three municipalities. In 1978, all parts were merged into Opmeer.

== Gallery ==
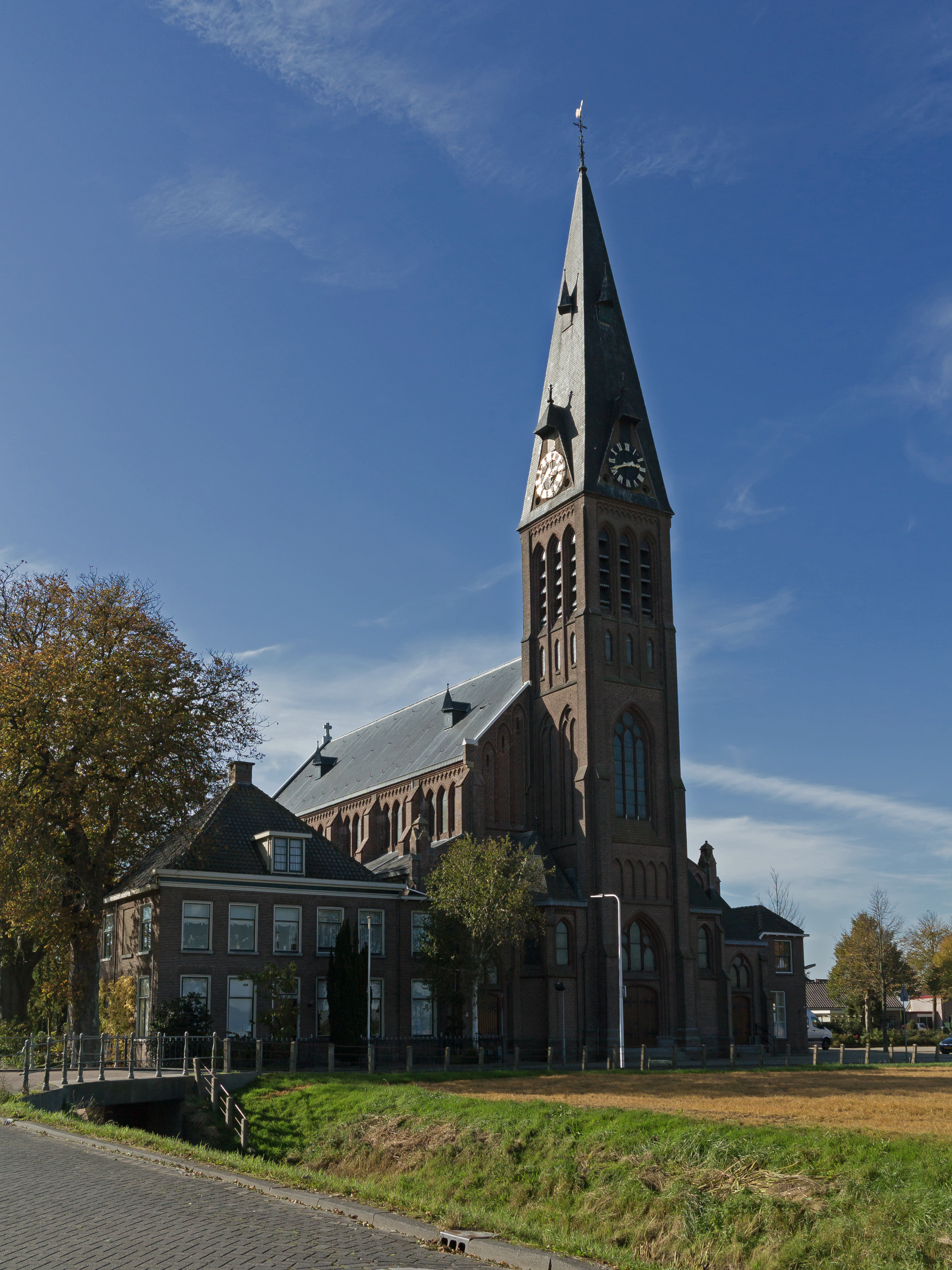
De Weere, church: de Sint Lambertuskerk

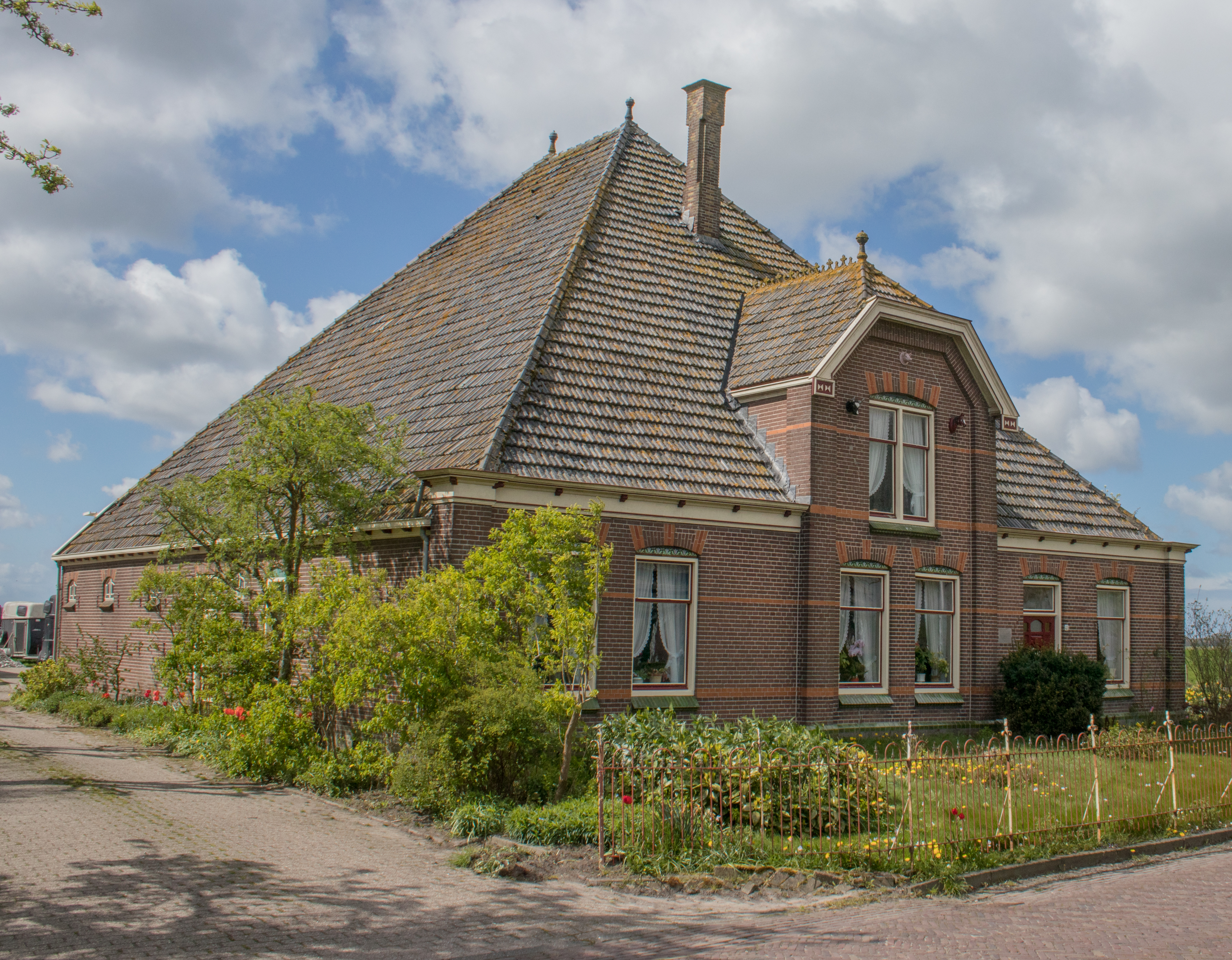
Farm in De Weere
