= Claude Brousson =

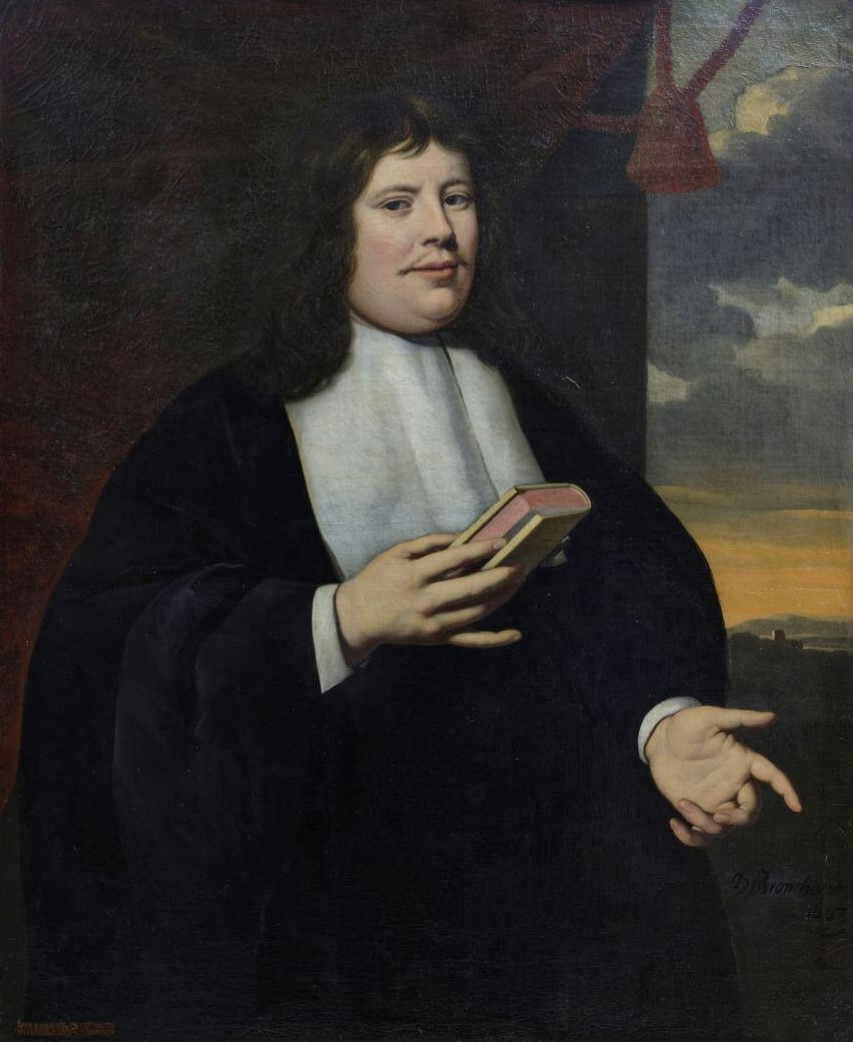
Claude Brousson in 1693

Claude Brousson (1647– 4 November 1698) was a French Huguenot lawyer and preacher. His work for the Huguenots is explained in the book by Dr. Samuel Smiles.

He returned to France after the Revocation of the Edict of Nantes, and was broken on the wheel in 1698.
