= Spanbroek =

- Small city
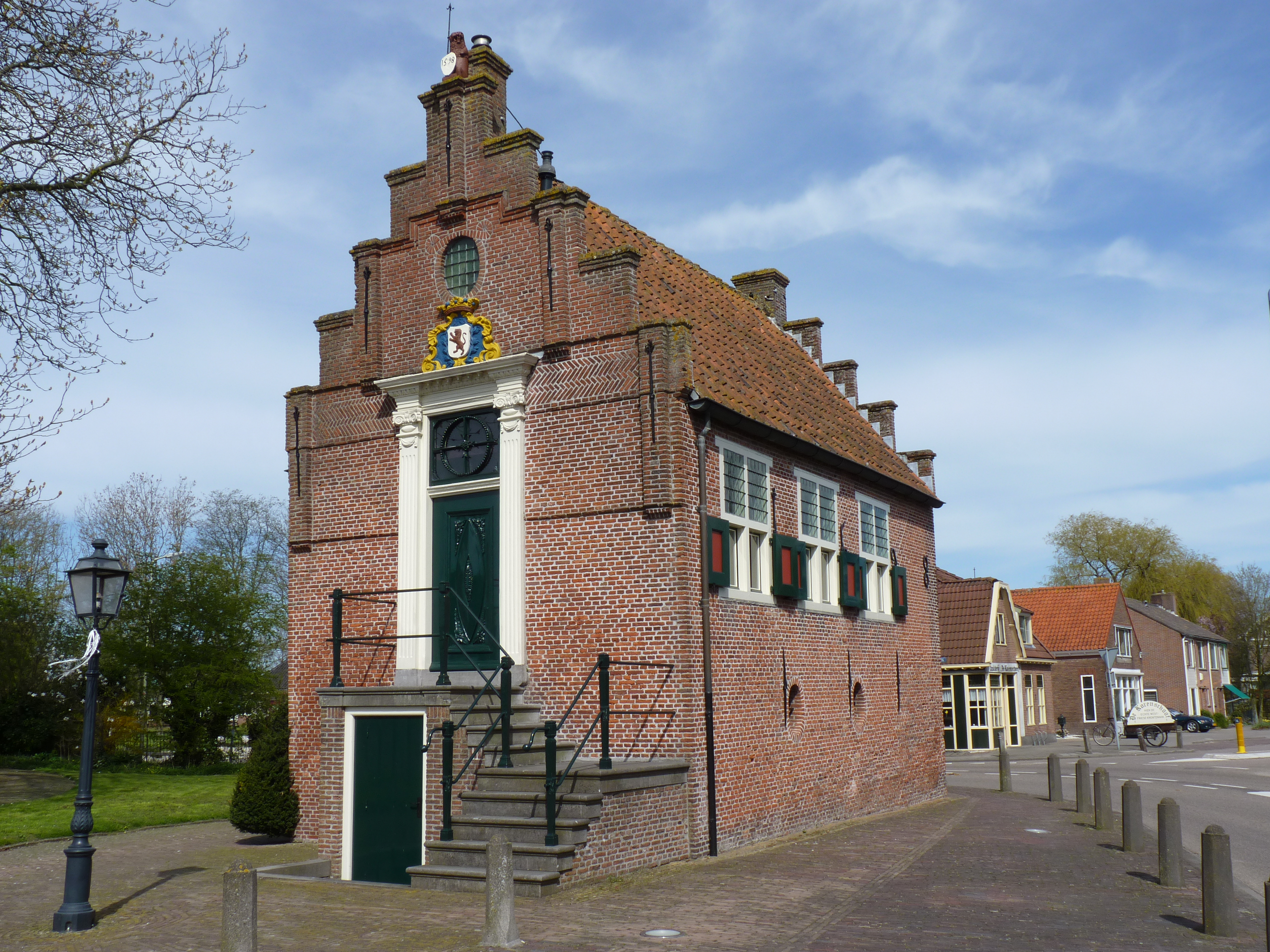
- Town hall

- Coat of arms

- Location in the Netherlands Location in the province of North Holland in the Netherlands
- Coordinates: 52°41′53″N 4°57′39″E
- Country: Netherlands
- Province: North Holland
- Municipality: Opmeer

Area
  - Small city: 3.83 km^{2} (1.48 sq mi)
- Elevation: −0.4 m (−1.3 ft)

Population (2025)
  - Small city: 4,720
  - Density: 1,230/km^{2} (3,190/sq mi)
  - Urban: 4,390
  - Rural: 225
- Time zone: UTC+1 (CET)
  - Summer (DST): UTC+2 (CEST)
- Postal code: 1715
- Dialing code: 0226

Spanbroek is a small city in the Dutch province of North Holland. It is a part of the municipality of Opmeer, and lies about 9 km (6 mi) northwest of Hoorn.

== History ==
Spanbroek was first mentioned in 1290 as Spanbroech, and is a combination of "swampy land" and "footbridge". Spanbroek developed in the Middle Ages as a peat excavation settlement. It received city rights in 1414.

The Dutch Reformed church is a single aisled church. The bottom part of the tower was built in the early 15th century and it received its current height in the late 15th century. The former town hall was built in 1598 and was used until 1881.

Spanbroek was home to 248 people in 1840. During 19th century, Opmeer merged with Spanbroek in a single urban area. Spanbroek was a separate municipality until 1959, when it was merged with Opmeer.

The Scheringa Museum of Realist Art is located in Spanbroek.

== Gallery ==
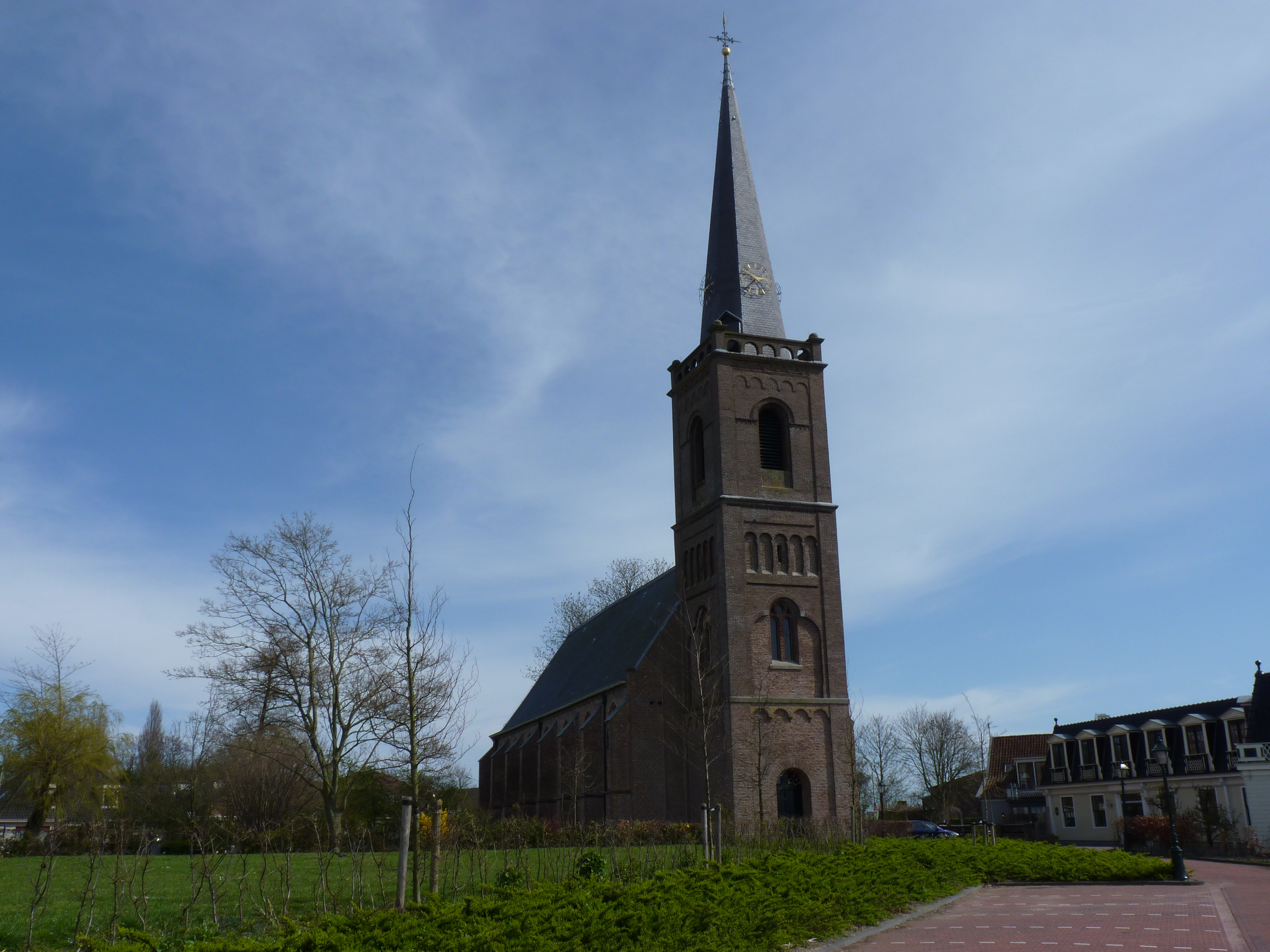
Dutch Reformed church

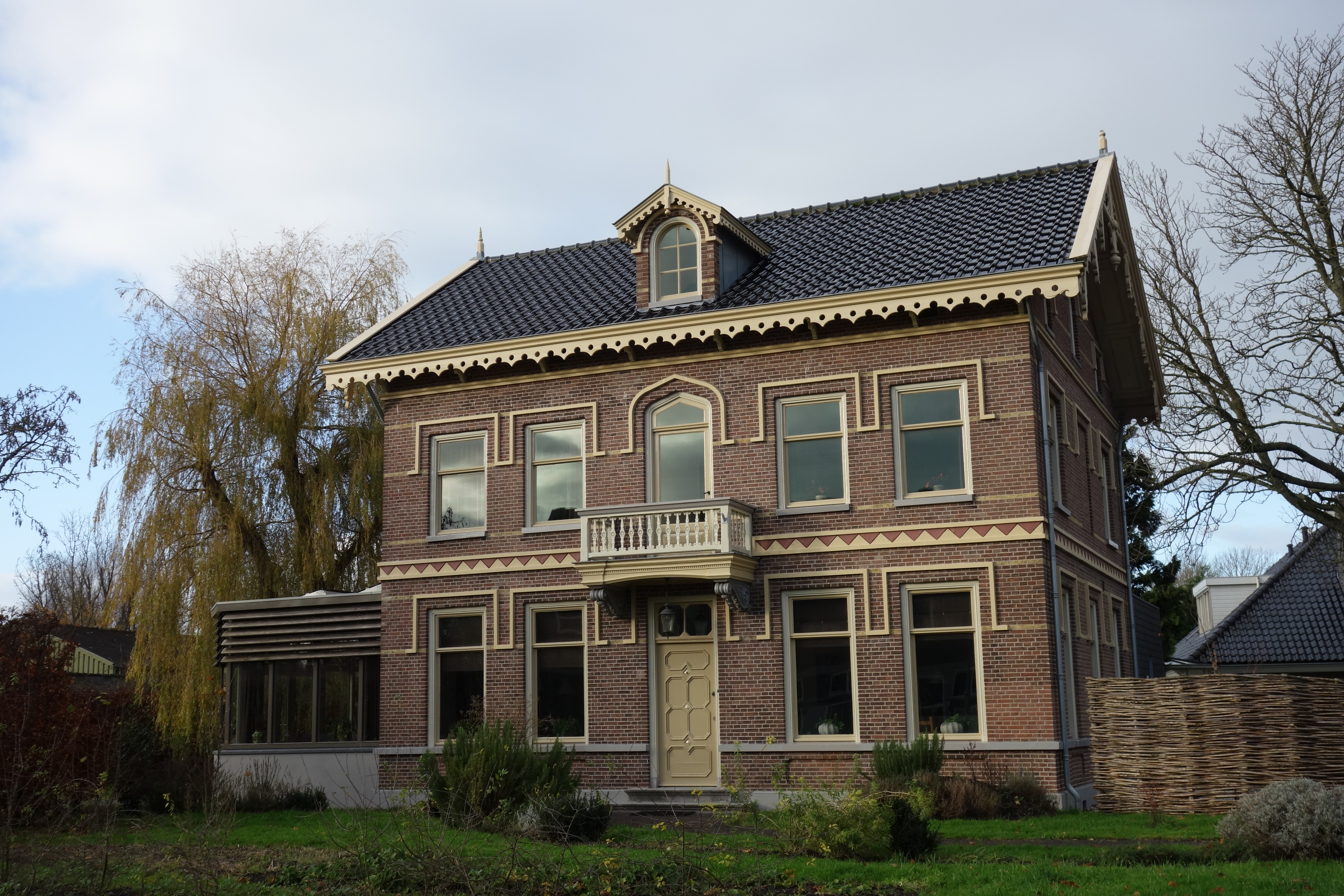
House in Spanbroek

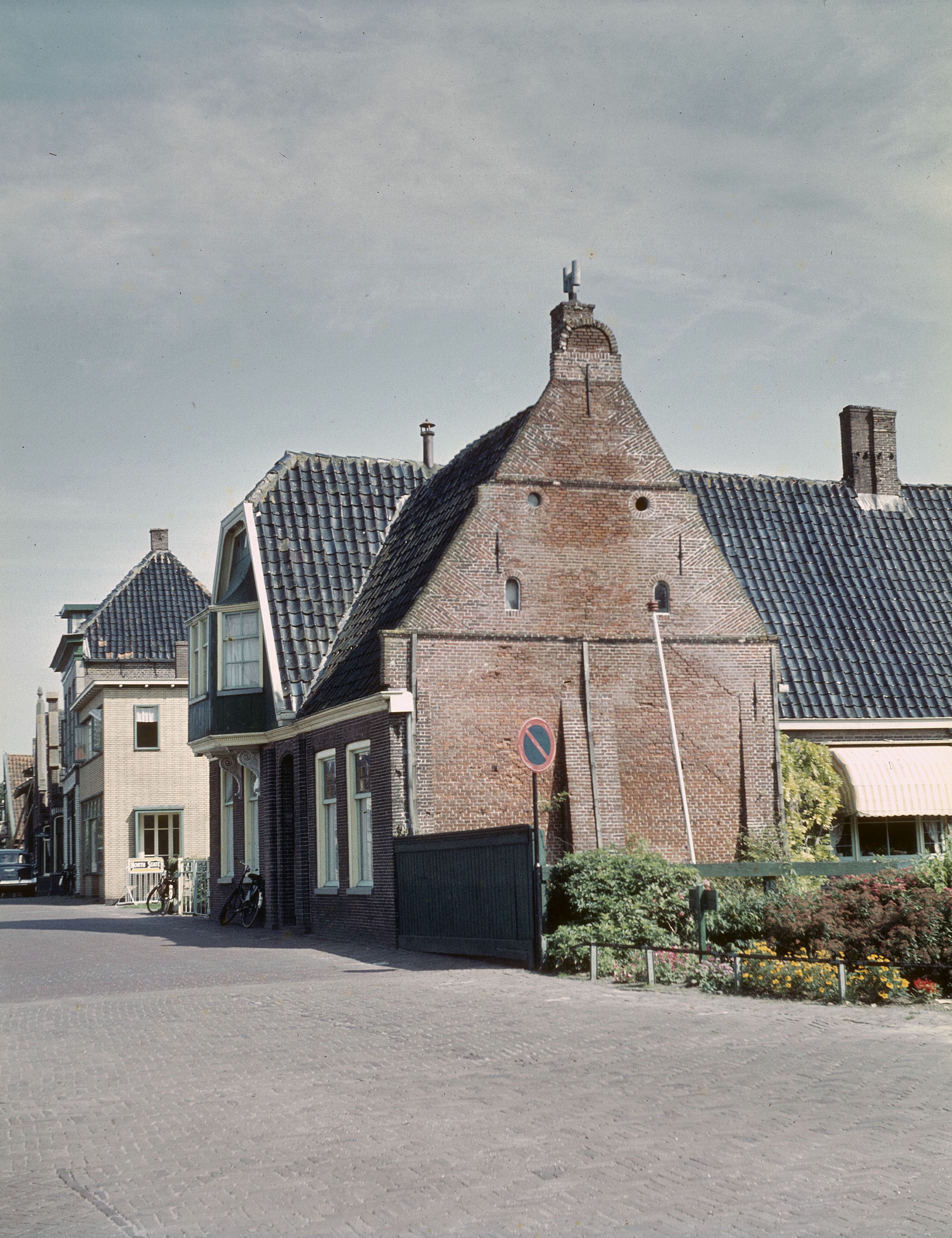
Street view

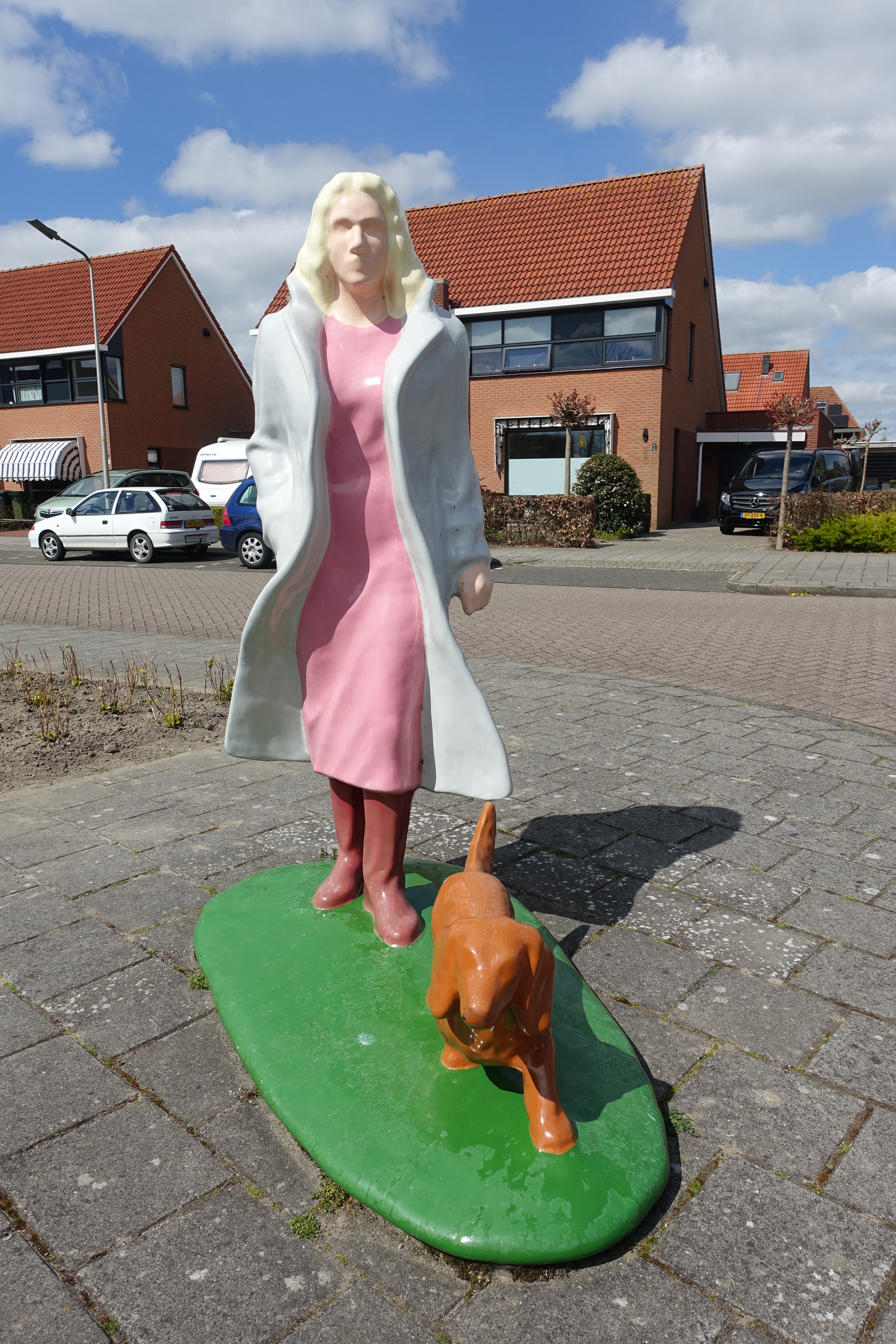
Woman and dog statue
