= Gouwe =

- Hamlet
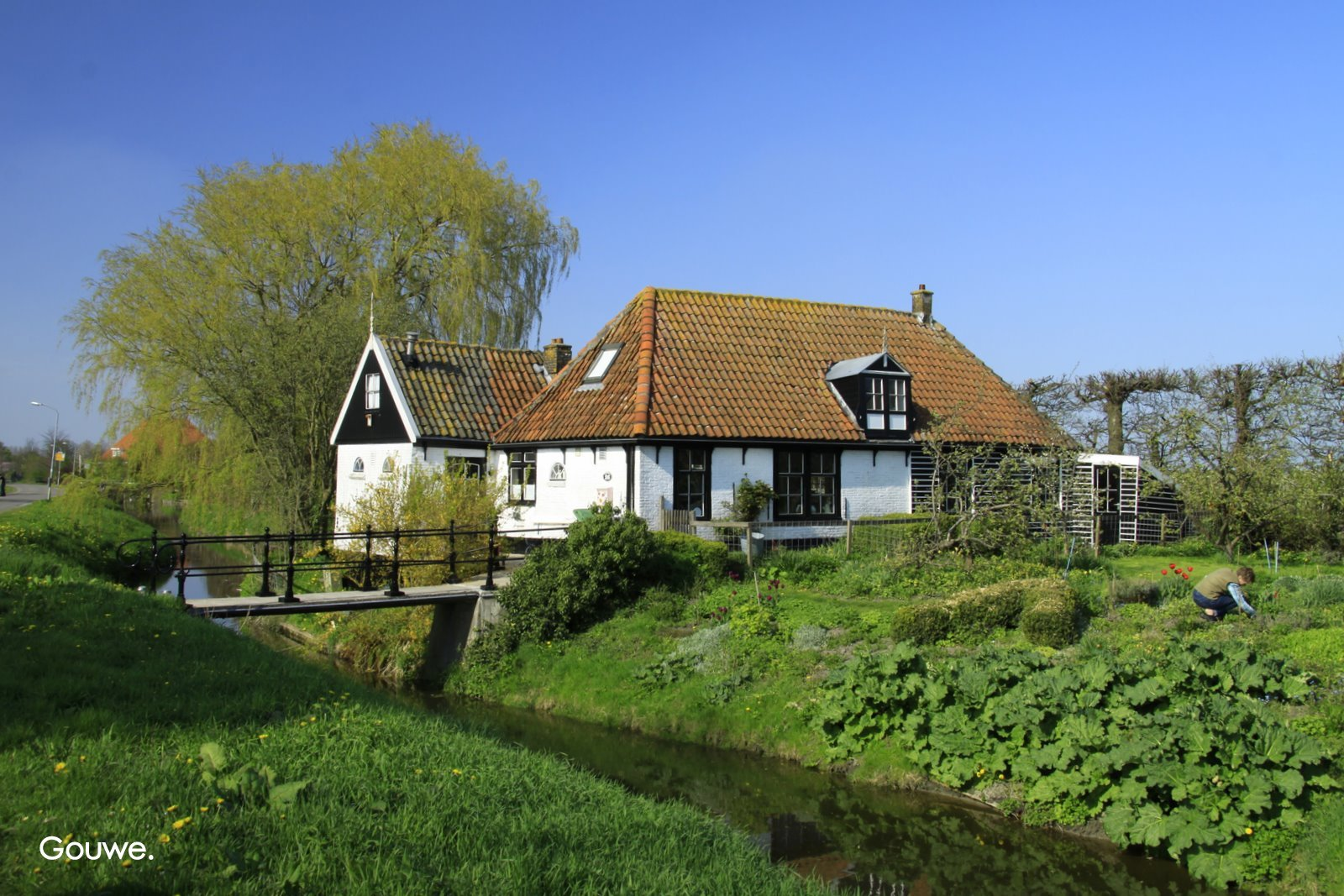

- Location in the Netherlands Location in the province of North Holland in the Netherlands
- Coordinates: 52°43′44″N 4°57′40″E
- Country: Netherlands
- Province: North Holland
- Municipality: Opmeer

Area
  - Total: 2.42 km^{2} (0.93 sq mi)
- Elevation: −0.4 m (−1.3 ft)

Population (2025)
  - Total: 240
  - Density: 99/km^{2} (260/sq mi)
- Time zone: UTC+1 (CET)
  - Summer (DST): UTC+2 (CEST)
- Postal code: 1718
- Dialing code: 0226

Gouwe is a hamlet in the Dutch province of North Holland. It is a part of the municipality of Opmeer, and lies about 11 km northwest of Hoorn.

The hamlet was first mentioned in 1437 as "bij de Gowe", and refers to a stream. The etymology of the word is unclear. The centre of the hamlet has place name sign, however the remainder of the hamlet is unmarked. It used to home to 190 people in 1840.
