= Graft-De Rijp =

- Former municipality
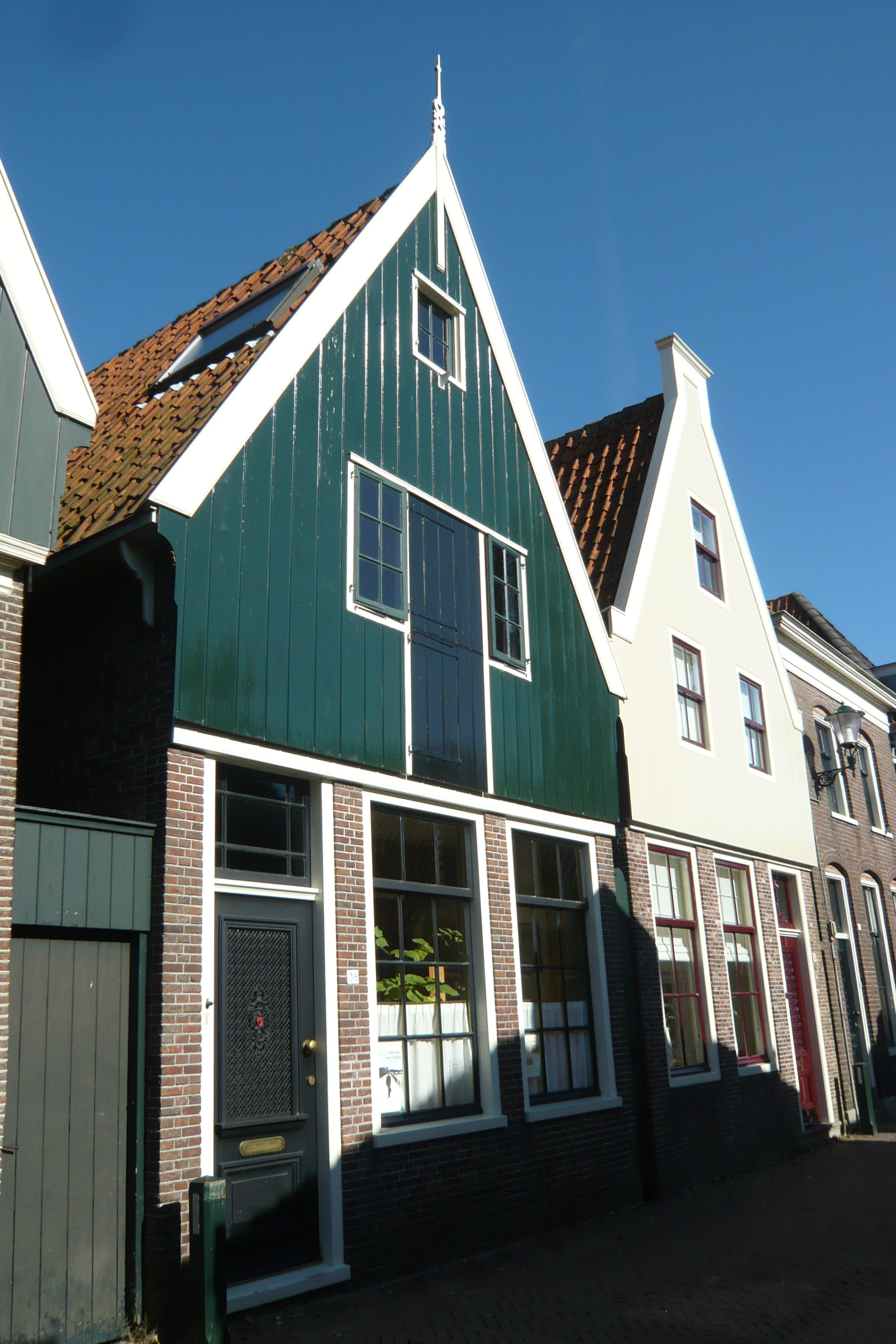
- Traditional houses in De Rijp

- Flag Coat of arms

- Location in North Holland
- Coordinates: 52°33′N 4°51′E
- Country: Netherlands
- Province: North Holland
- Municipality: Alkmaar
- Established: 1 August 1970

Area
  - Total: 21.76 km^{2} (8.40 sq mi)
  - Land: 20.03 km^{2} (7.73 sq mi)
  - Water: 1.73 km^{2} (0.67 sq mi)
- Elevation: −2 m (−6.6 ft)

Population (January 2021)
  - Total: data missing
- Time zone: UTC+1 (CET)
  - Summer (DST): UTC+2 (CEST)
- Postcode: 1483–1488, 1536
- Area code: 0299

Graft-De Rijp (Dutch pronunciation: [ˌɣrɑvdəˈrɛip]) is a former municipality in the province of North Holland in the Netherlands. Since January 2015 it has been a part of Alkmaar.

It is twinned with Chalfont St Giles in England.

== Population centres ==
The municipality of Graft-De Rijp contained the following towns and villages: De Rijp, Graft, Markenbinnen, Noordeinde, Oost-Graftdijk, Starnmeer, West-Graftdijk.

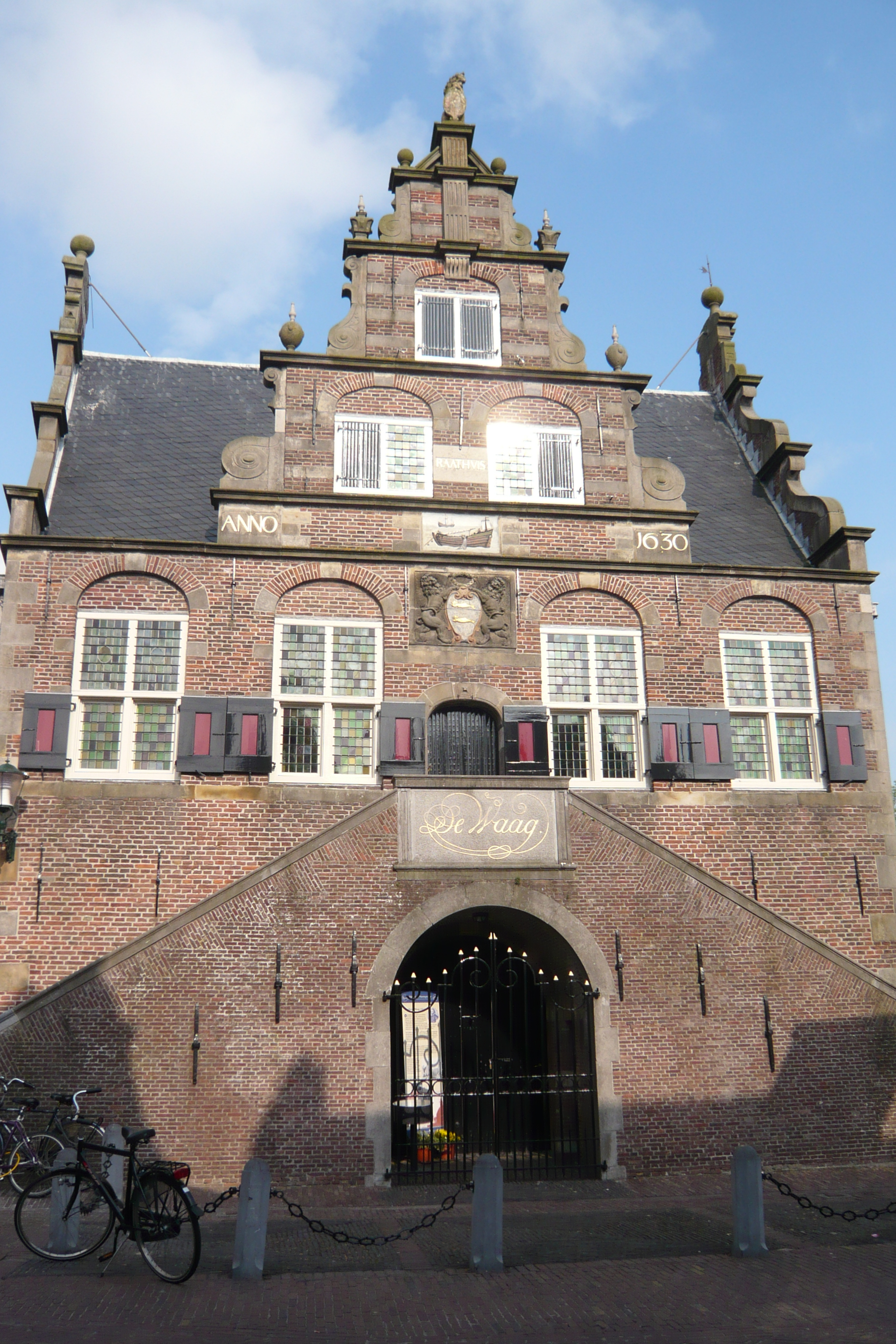
Former weigh house and Town hall of De Rijp, designed by Jan Leeghwater in 1630

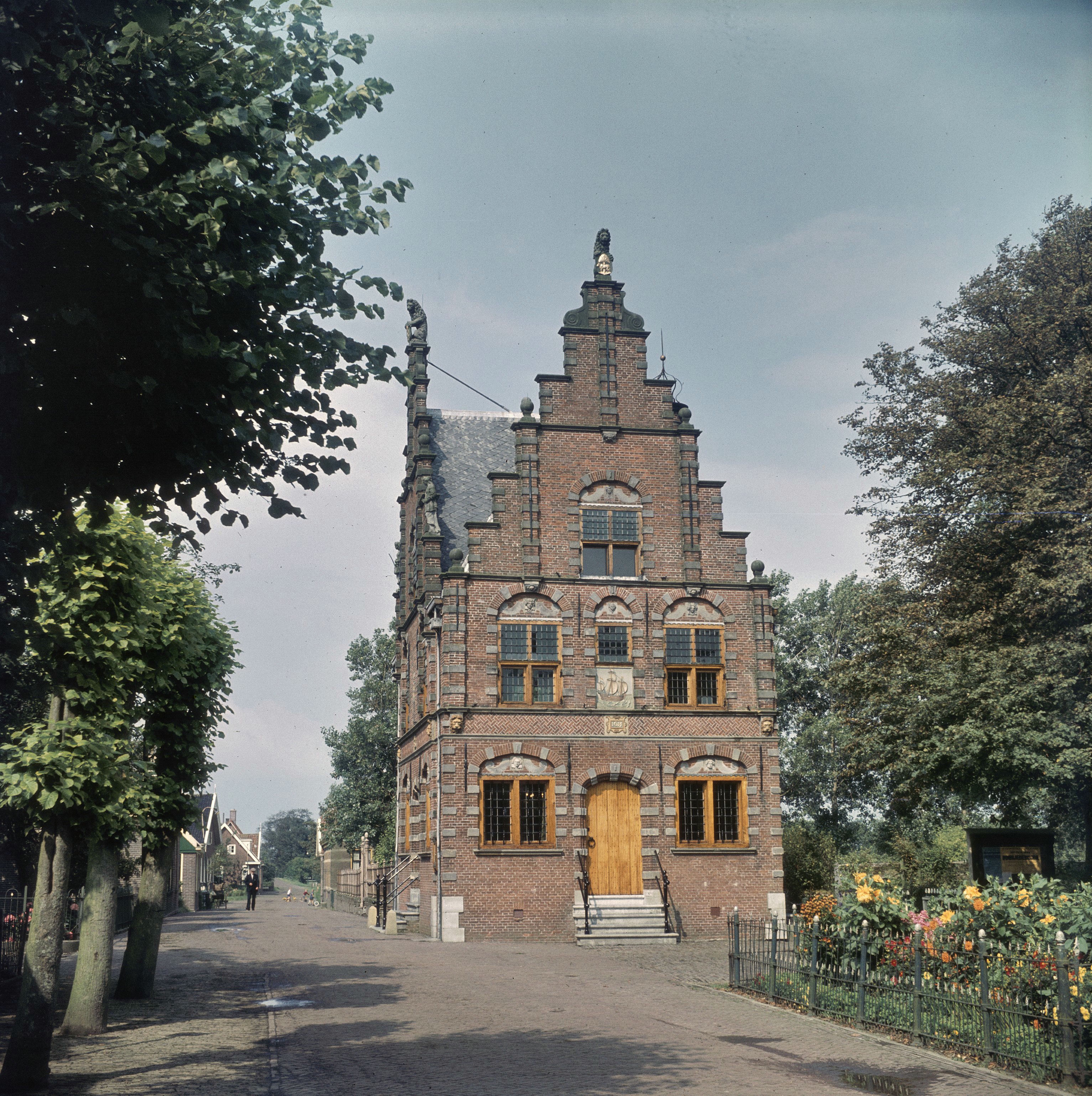
Town Hall of Graft, built in 1613 in the style of Hendrick de Keyser

== Local government ==
The municipal council of Graft-De Rijp consisted of 13 seats, which at the final election, in 2010, were divided as follows:

- PvdA - 5 seats
- VVD - 3 seats
- CDA - 3 seats
- Het Verschil - 2 seats

An election was held in November 2014 for a council for the new merged Alkmaar municipality that commenced work on 1 January 2015, replacing Graft-De Rijp council.
