= Noordeinde =

Noordeinde is a Dutch placename, meaning "North end". It refers to several Dutch settlements:

- Noordeinde, Gelderland
- Noordeinde, Utrecht
- Noordeinde, Zeeland
- Noordeinde, Alkmaar, in North Holland
- Noordeinde, Berkel en Rodenrijs, in South Holland
- Noordeinde, Nieuwkoop, in South Holland
- Noordeinde, Oostzaan, in North Holland

It also refers to a street in The Hague, and to the Noordeinde Palace located there.

== See also ==
- Zuideinde (disambiguation) ("south end")
