= Jan Janz Slop =

Dutch painter

Jan Janz Slop, or Jan Slob (1643 in Edam – 1727), was a Dutch Golden Age painter.

According to Houbraken, he was a glasspainter who lived to be the last of a breed. He had been a pupil of Jozef Oostfries and was still active at 75 when Houbraken was writing in 1712.

He married Heiltje Sieuwerts on 31 December 1661 in Hoorn with attestatie from Edam. Heiltje was the sister of Catharina Oostfries, and when Catharina's husband Claes van der Meulen died, he was named as guardian over their children in Catharina's will.
