= Jozef Oostfries =

Dutch painter

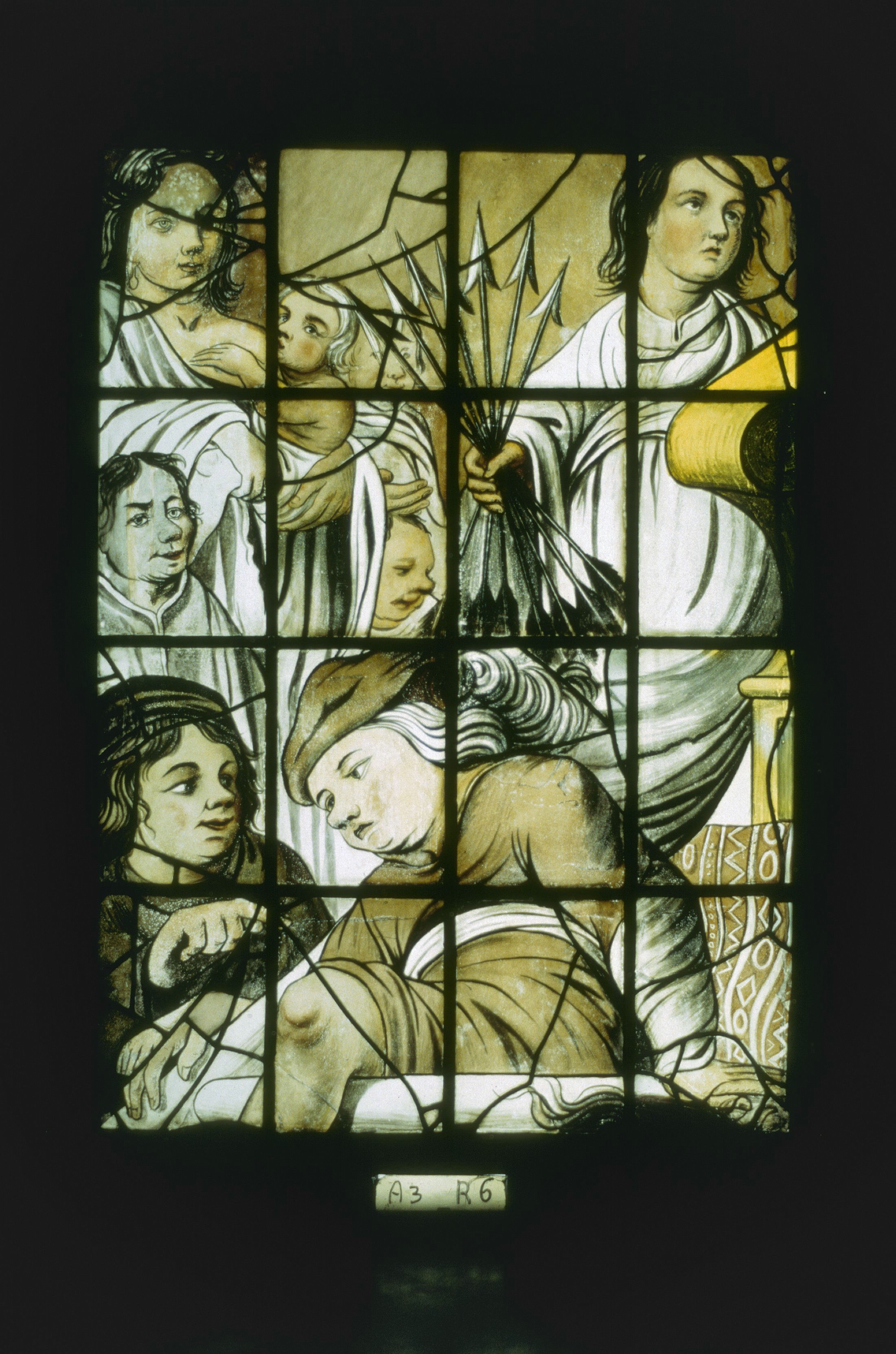
Detail of stained-glass window #6 showing an allegory in celebration of the Peace of Münster in 1648, designed by Oostfries in 1655 for the Grote Kerk, De Rijp

Jozef Oostfries (1628–1661) was a Dutch Golden Age glass painter.

== Biography ==
Oostfries was born in Hoorn. According to Houbraken he was a pupil of the glasspainter Jan Maartz Engelsman and the older brother and teacher of Catharina Oostfries, who kept up her drawing and glass painting into her seventies. His pupil was Jan Slob.
