= De Rijp =

- Village
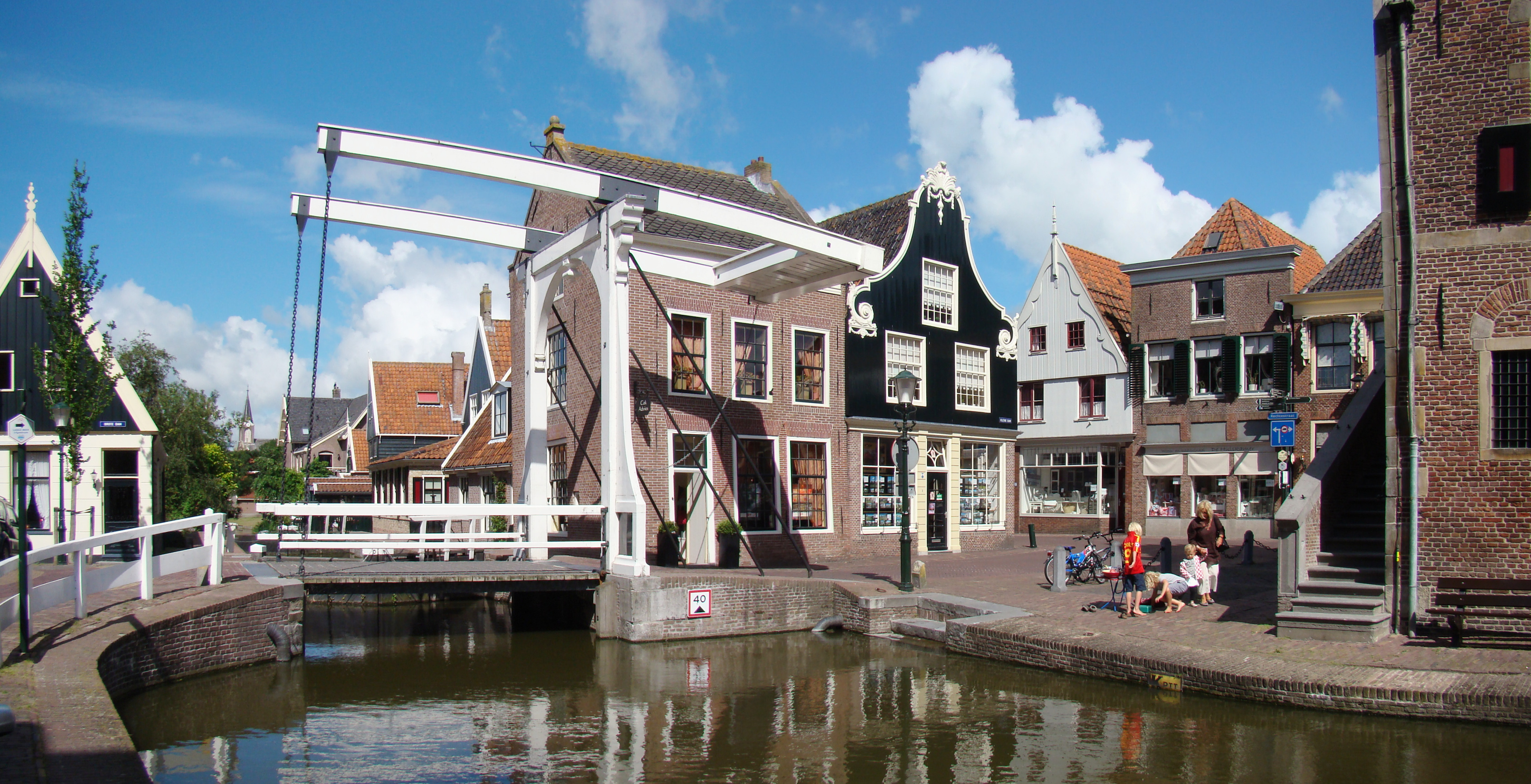
- Drawbridge and Grote Dam (right: the Town hall)

- Flag Coat of arms

- Location in the Netherlands Location in the province of North Holland in the Netherlands
- Coordinates: 52°33′25″N 4°50′43″E
- Country: Netherlands
- Province: North Holland
- Municipality: Alkmaar

Area
  - Total: 3.38 km^{2} (1.31 sq mi)
- Elevation: −0.7 m (−2.3 ft)

Population (2021)
  - Total: 4,105
  - Density: 1,210/km^{2} (3,150/sq mi)
- Time zone: UTC+1 (CET)
  - Summer (DST): UTC+2 (CEST)
- Postal code: 1483
- Dialing code: 0299

De Rijp is a village and former island in the Dutch province of North Holland. It is a part of the municipality of Alkmaar, and lies about 10 km northwest of Purmerend, between the Schermer and the Beemster polders. Before the poldering of the lakes surrounding it, De Rijp was famous for its herring industry. Today it is known for its characteristic rijksmonuments, which include some of the oldest wooden houses of North Holland.

De Rijp was a separate municipality until 1970, when it merged with Graft.

The statistical area "De Rijp", which also can include the surrounding countryside, has a population of around 4020.

== History ==
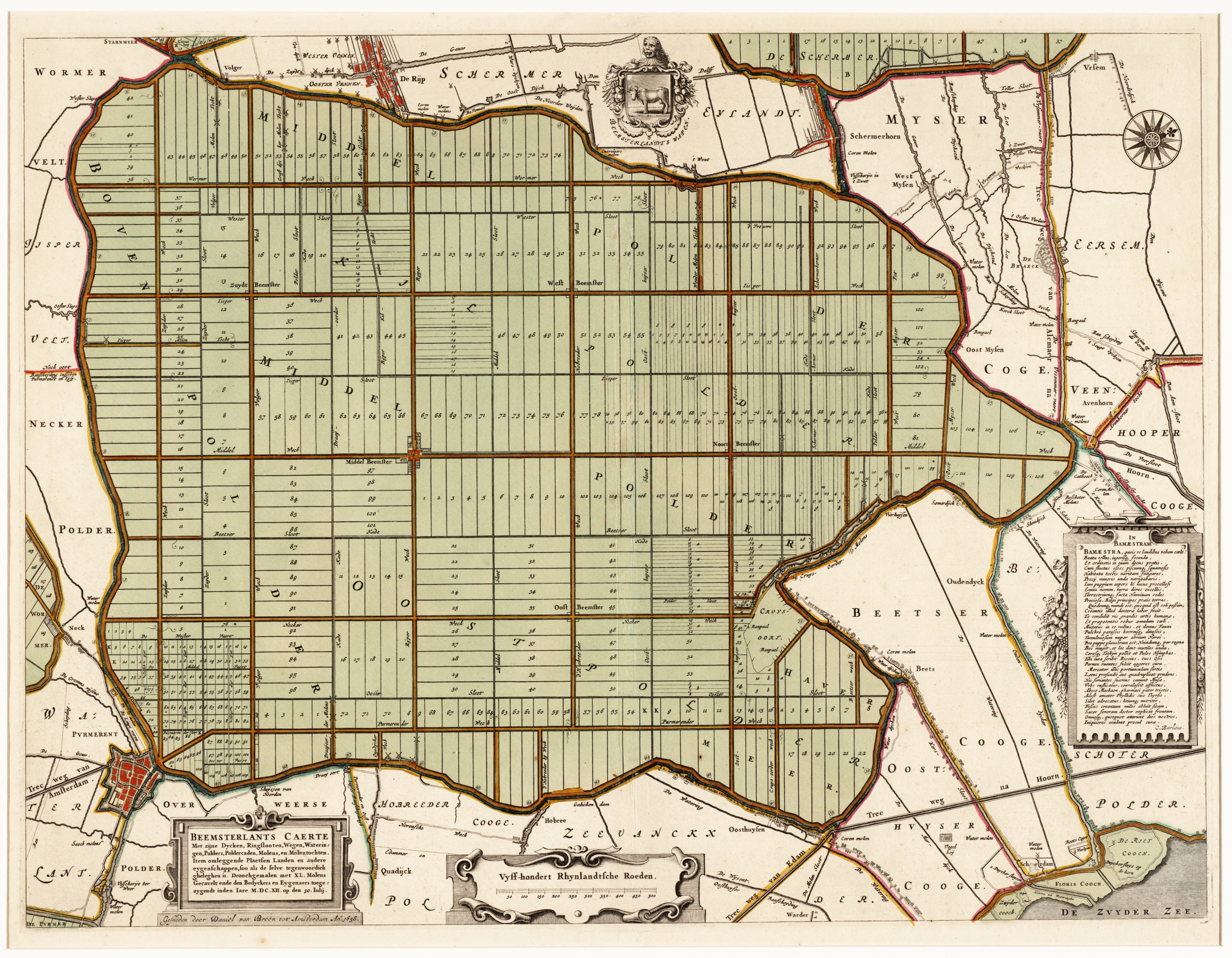
Map dated 1658 of the Beemster polder, a former lake pumped dry in 1612 that is today a World Heritage Site. This map shows the town of De Rijp at the top. In the area to the left of the Rijperweg the new church can be seen and a small number of houses that were rebuilt after the fire of 1654.

Before the lakes on either side of De Rijp were pumped dry, De Rijp was a port town with merchant ships that travelled the high seas on trade routes. The town had a medium-sized herring fleet, and searched for whales with larger ships. Rijper vessels travelled regularly to Spitsbergen. After the success of the polders near Alkmaar and Egmond, plans were formed to make polders of the other lakes in North Holland, including the ones on both sides of De Rijp. In 1605 De Rijp split off from Graft and became a relief center for the effort to pump the Beemster dry. The project was run by the architect-engineer Jan Leeghwater, who had been born in De Rijp and even designed the Town hall.

The coat of arms of De Rijp show two herrings which symbolize the importance of the fishing industry for the town. The polders meant that the Rijper ships needed to travel much further before they were on open water. The herring industry remained important however and the stained glass window in the Grote Kerk with the city coat of arms of Enkhuizen, donated by the cooper's guild, shows the barrels that were made for use by the herring packers in De Rijp in 1655. The town had suffered a devastating fire in 1654 which wiped out the southern side of the town and destroyed the church, leaving only the north side (including the city hall) intact. The herring ships had been undamaged and it was their industry that enabled the town to rebuild the church. When it was completed in 1655, various guilds such as the coopers, and other towns of North Holland donated stained glass windows with their coats of arms in 1655. These included Medemblik, Alkmaar, Haarlem, Amsterdam, Monnickendam, Edam, Enkhuizen, and Purmerend. This group of stained-glass windows are considered national treasures and were restored in 1993-1995 when safety glass with a fine mesh of metal was installed on the outside of the window frames but left open at the edges to prevent condensation. Similar safety measures have been taken for the stained-glass windows of Gouda.

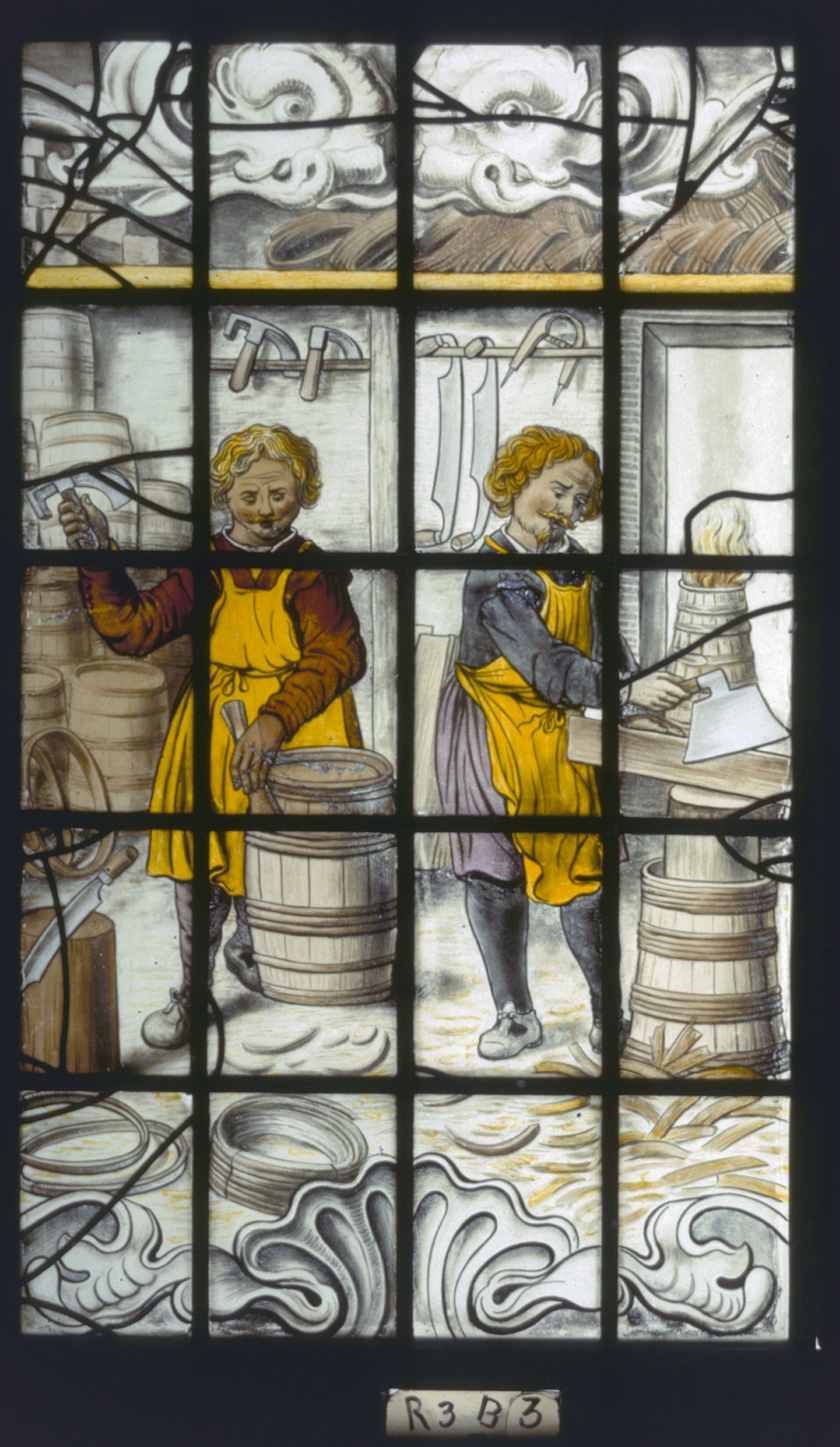
Glass 3 (detail) showing two coopers making barrels

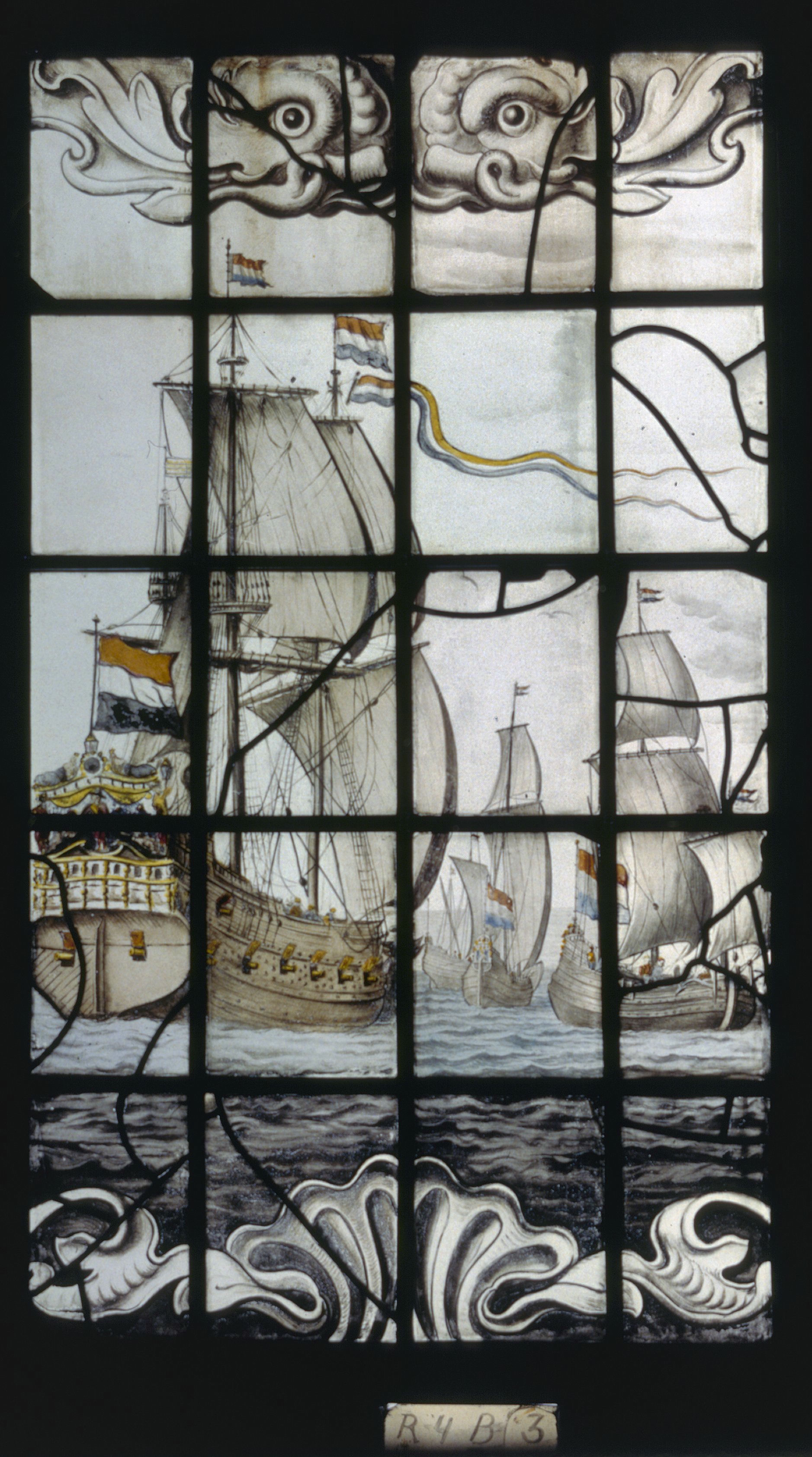
Glass 4 (detail) showing the herring fleet

== In fiction ==
Part of the 2021 film De Grote Sinterklaasfilm: Trammelant in Spanje was filmed in De Rijp.
