= Jan Maertz Engelsman =

Dutch painter

Jan Maertz Engelsman (1593 in Hoorn – 1654 in Alkmaar), was a Dutch Golden Age painter and member of the Hoorn city council.

According to Houbraken he was a glasspainter who taught Josef Oostfries. He was also known as Jan Jansz Engelsman or simply Jan Maertsz, and was a member of the Hoorn council from 1594 to 1618. He is mentioned in Theodorus Velius' Chronyk van Hoorn. Stained glass windows by him are registered in Alkmaar, Zuid-Schermer, Broek in Waterland, and Etershem. According to the RKD he was a glasspainter who signed his works "IME".
