= Sieuwert van der Meulen =

Dutch painter

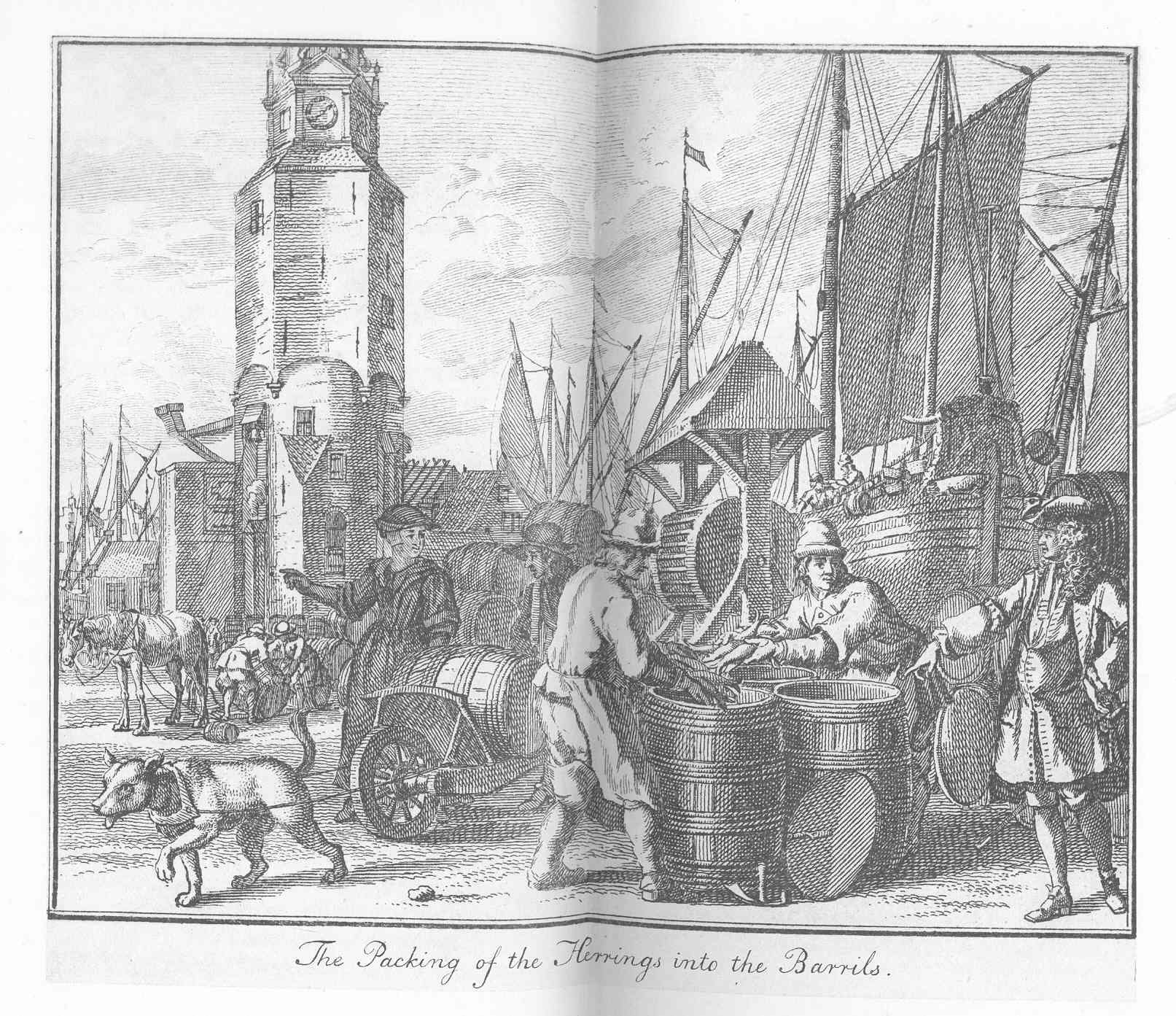
Packing of the Herrings into the Barrils by Sieuwert van der Meulen, 1792

Sieuwert van der Meulen (1663 – 18 June (buried) 1730) was an 18th-century painter from the Dutch Republic.

== Biography ==
He was born in Alkmaar, the son of Catharina Oostfries and Claes van der Meulen and became a member of the Alkmaar Guild of St. Luke in 1700. He designed and etched prints, for example a series of 16 etchings titled Navigiorum Aedificatio, on the history of a ship. This was published by Peter Schenk the Elder in Amsterdam and shows a pictorial documentary of how ships were built, launched, repaired, provisioned, and used in the early 18th century.

According to the RKD he is known for marinescapes and birds. He also worked in Haarlem, but died in his home town of Alkmaar.
