= Claes Pietersz van der Meulen =

Dutch Golden Age glass painter

Claes Pietersz van der Meulen or Klaas Pietersz. van der Meule (1642–1693) was a Dutch Golden Age glass painter.

== Biography ==
Van der Meulen was born in Alkmaar. According to Houbraken he was an industrious painter who married Catharina Oostfries, a painter who kept up her drawing and glass painting into her seventies. His works could be seen in Alkmaar and the towns near there. Claes Pietersz van der Meulen, or Klaas Pietersz. van der Meule, became a member of the glass painters' guild in Alkmaar in 1660. In 1665 the glass painters' guild merged with the Alkmaar Guild of St. Luke, and his pupils were registered their archives; in 1664 he took on the pupil Louris Gerritsz, in 1665 Gerrit Pietersz van der Molen, in 1668 Gerrit van der Molen, in 1679 Pieter Andriesz, in 1683 Jan Govertsz, in 1685 Jan Sparboom, and in 1695 Pieter Lucasz. In 1673 he made windows for the church in Graft. For making and painting stained glass in the church in Koog aan de Zaan built in 1686 he received 96 guilders. Of his seven children, Sieuwert van der Meulen also became a painter.
