= Catharina Oostfries =

Dutch artist (1636–1708)

Catharina Oostfries, or Trijntje Sieuwerts (1636–1708) was a Dutch Golden Age glass painter.

== Biography ==
Oostfries was born in Nieuwkoop. According to Houbraken she kept up her drawing and glass painting into her seventies.

According to the RKD she was the daughter of Siewert Oostvries, and was also known as Trijntje Siewerts. She was trained by her older brother Jozef Oostfries, a respected glass painter in Hoorn. She married the glass painter Claes Pietersz van der Meulen, and their son Sieuwert van der Meulen also became a painter. Her sister Heiltje married the painter Jan Slob, who had been a pupil of her brother. She died in Alkmaar.
