= De Rijp Town Hall =

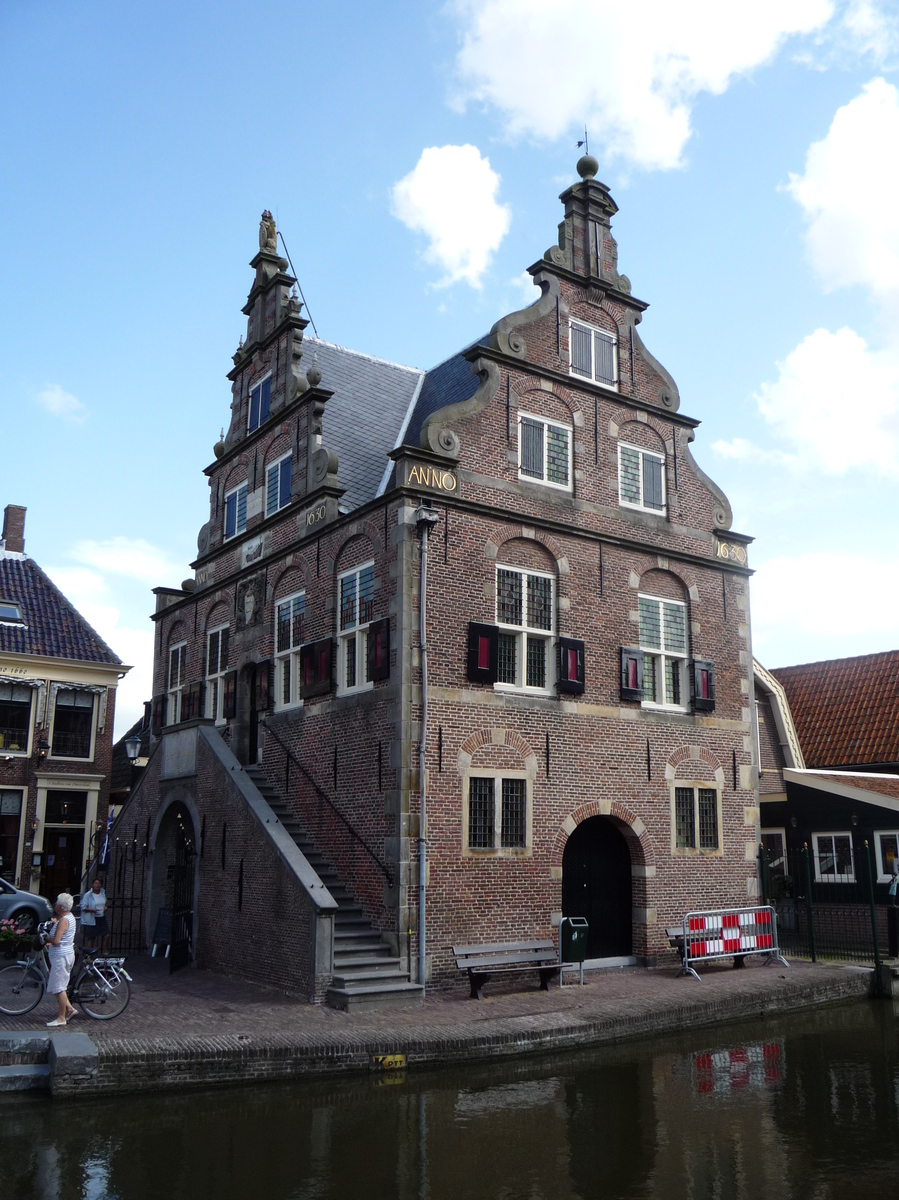
- Town Hall, today the visitor center
- Interactive map of the De Rijp Town Hall area
- Alternative names: Raadhuis De Rijp

General information
- Type: Seat of local government
- Architectural style: Amsterdam renaissance style
- Location: De Rijp, Kleine Dam
- Coordinates: 52°33′34.90″N 4°50′59.58″E
- Completed: 1630
- Owner: Municipality Graft-De Rijp

Design and construction
- Architect: Jan Leeghwater

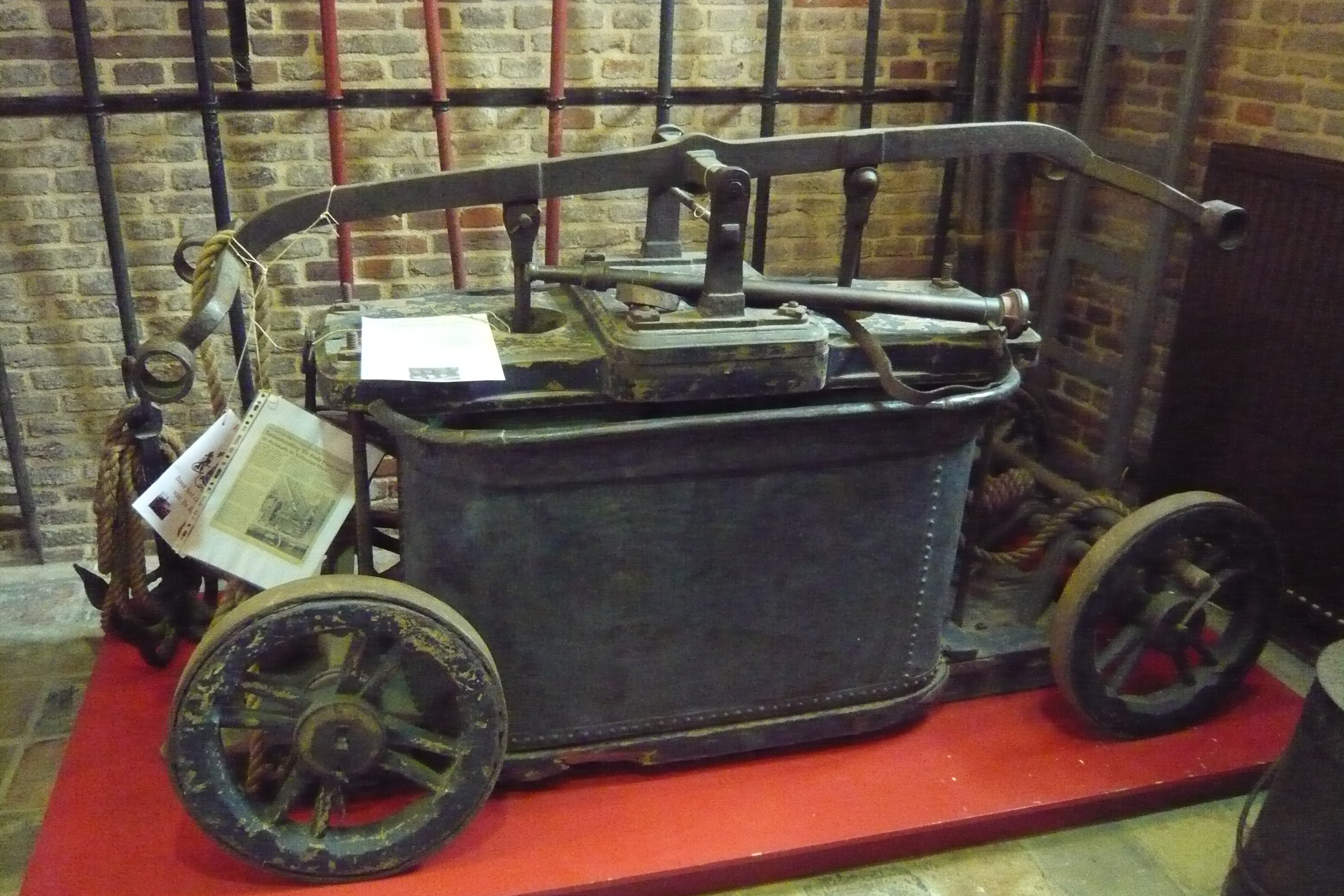
Fire hose apparatus designed by Jan van der Heyden in De Rijp town hall

The Town Hall of De Rijp is a former city hall in De Rijp, Netherlands. The government offices have moved, but the former waag and burgerzaal are still used for weddings and other official proceedings. The rest of the building is in use as the local visitor center of De Rijp.

== History ==
The building was designed by the architect-engineer Jan Leeghwater. He designed and built it 1630, after he had already occupied the location as mayor and manager of the Beemster polder project, completed in 1612. The building survived a fire in 1654 that damaged most of the town south of this building. The former mayor's office and vierschaar can only be seen by appointment, but visitors are welcome on the ground floor, which has a short film about the history of De Rijp for visitors, and where the old weighing scales from 1632 can be seen. One of three old fire hoses designed by Jan van der Heyden in 1672, which were formerly in use by the Town fire brigade can also be seen there. This apparatus has been kept in working order and is used occasionally for demonstrations.
