= Grote Kerk, De Rijp =

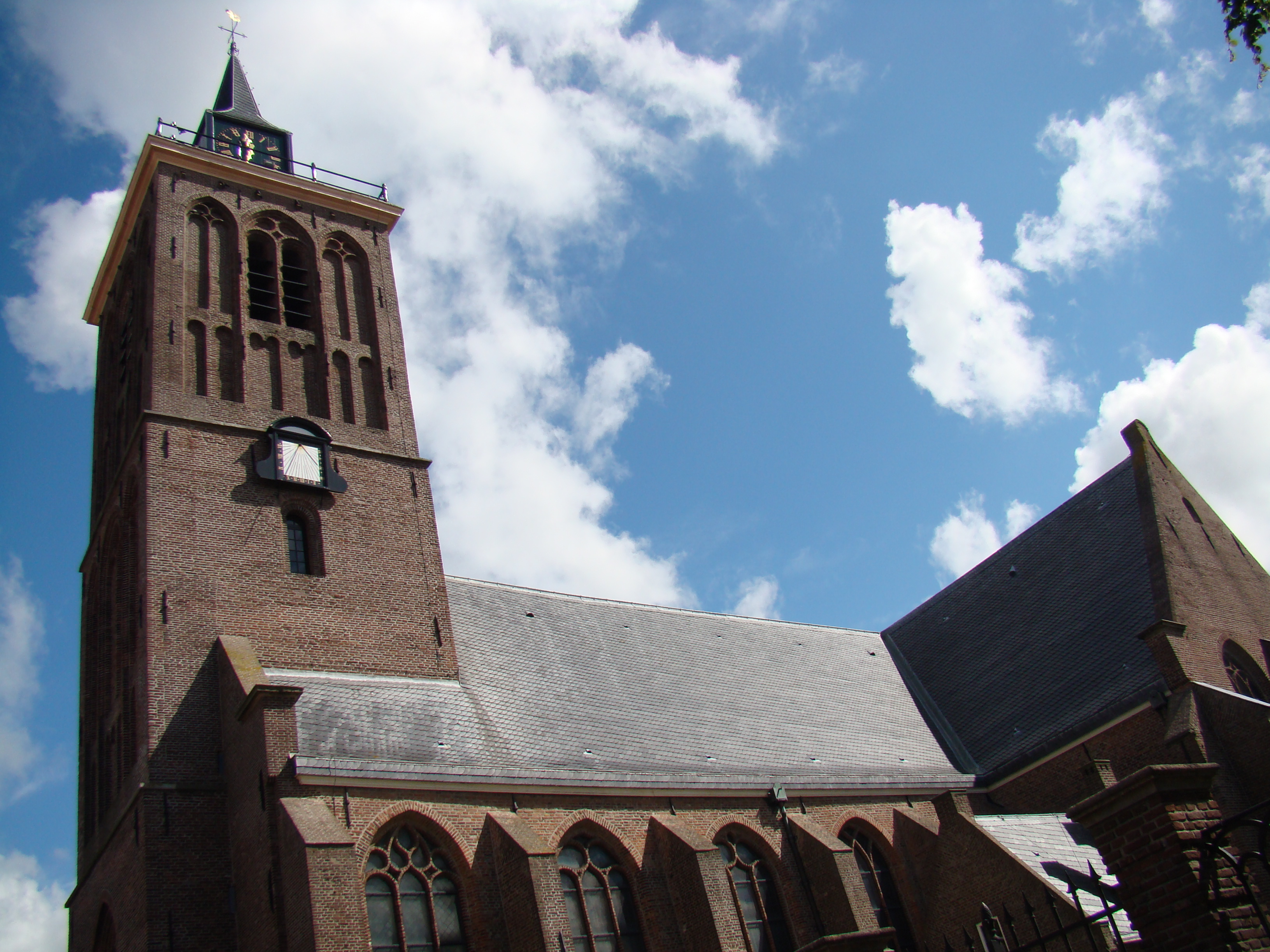
- View of the church tower from the churchyard.
- Grote Kerk, De Rijp
- 52°33′34.90″N 4°50′59.58″E
- Location: Grote Dam, De Rijp
- Country: Netherlands
- Denomination: Protestant

History
- Founded: 1529

Architecture
- Style: Gothic
- Years built: 1529-1661

Administration
- Parish: Graft-De Rijp

The Grote Kerk is a Protestant church in De Rijp, Netherlands, located near the Town Hall. The church is known for its 17th-century stained-glass windows.

== History ==
The church was built in 1529 but burned in 1654 during the fire in January of that year. It was rebuilt in 1654–1655. The windows date from this period and were gifts to the community from various cities in North Holland that surround the town. The clock tower was added in 1661 and contains two bells by Antoni Wilkes made in 1663. A ship's model from 1696 hangs near the entrance. The pulpit with copper bible support and the baptismal gates and font all date from the 17th-century.

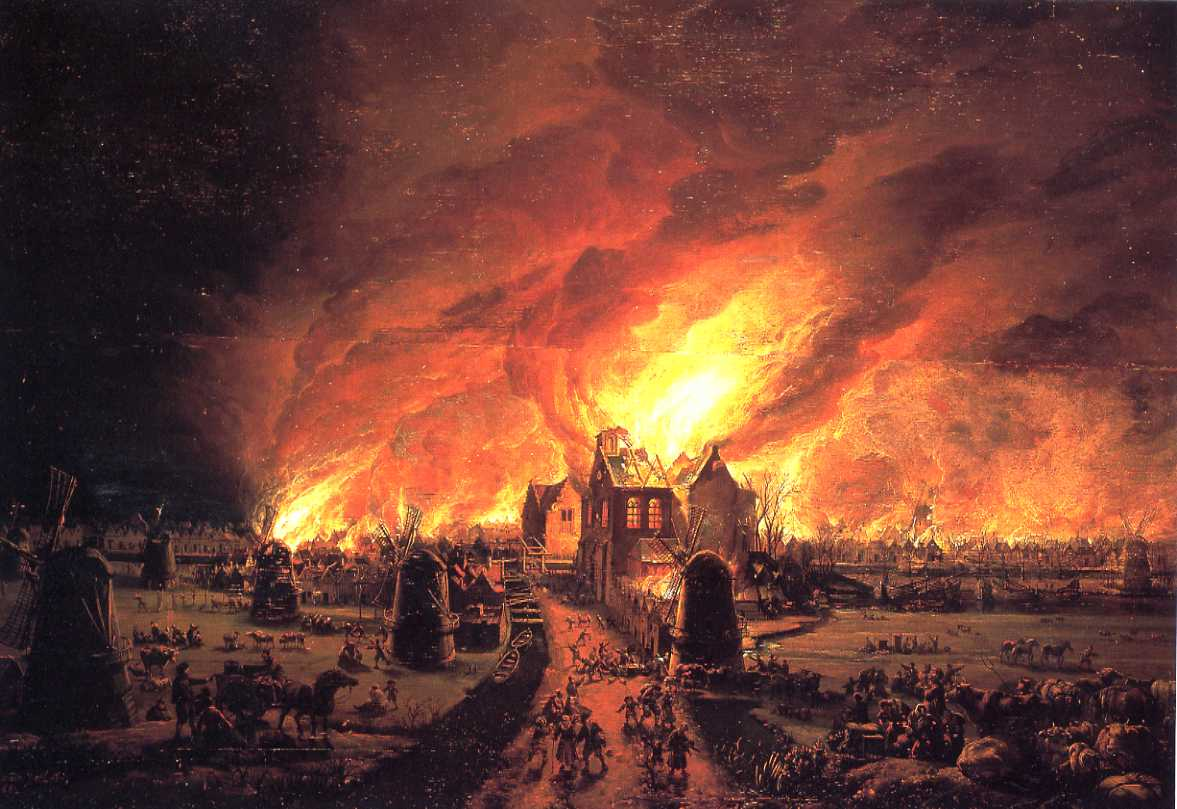
The Great Fire of 1654 in De Rijp, by Egbert van der Poel
