= Zuideinde =

Zuideinde (English: south end) refers to a number of Dutch villages:

- Zuideinde, Langedijk, near Sint Pancras, North Holland
- Zuideinde, Overijssel, near Kampen
- Zuideinde, South Holland, near Nieuwkoop
- Zuideinde, Utrecht, near Breukelen
- Zuideinde, Zaanstad, near Assendelft, North Holland
