= Oost-Graftdijk =

- Village
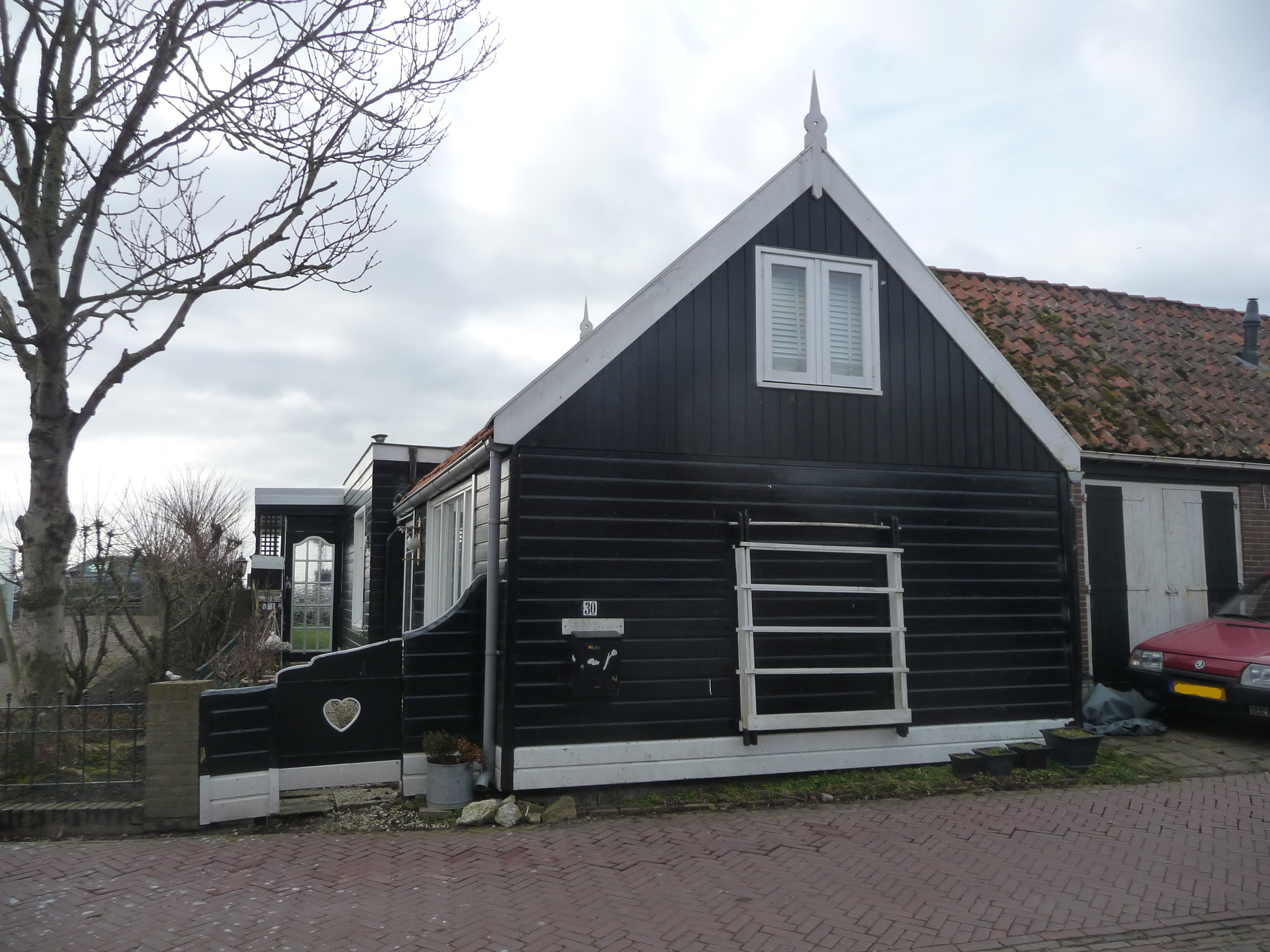
- House in Oost-Graftdijk

- Location in the Netherlands Location in the province of North Holland in the Netherlands
- Coordinates: 52°33′N 4°49′E
- Country: Netherlands
- Province: North Holland
- Municipality: Alkmaar

Area
  - Total: 1.38 km^{2} (0.53 sq mi)
- Elevation: −1.5 m (−4.9 ft)

Population (2021)
  - Total: 145
  - Density: 105/km^{2} (272/sq mi)
- Time zone: UTC+1 (CET)
  - Summer (DST): UTC+2 (CEST)
- Postal code: 1487
- Dialing code: 072

Oost-Graftdijk is a village in the Dutch province of North Holland. It is a part of the municipality of Alkmaar, and lies about 11 km west of Purmerend.

== History ==
The village was first mentioned in 1639 as Oostbuert. The current name means "eastern dike of the (de Vuile) Graft (river)". Oost- (east) has been added to distinguish from West-Graftdijk. Oost-Graftdijk is a dike village which developed in the second half of the 16th century. Around 1870, a basic Mennonite church was built in Oost-Graftdijk.

== Gallery ==
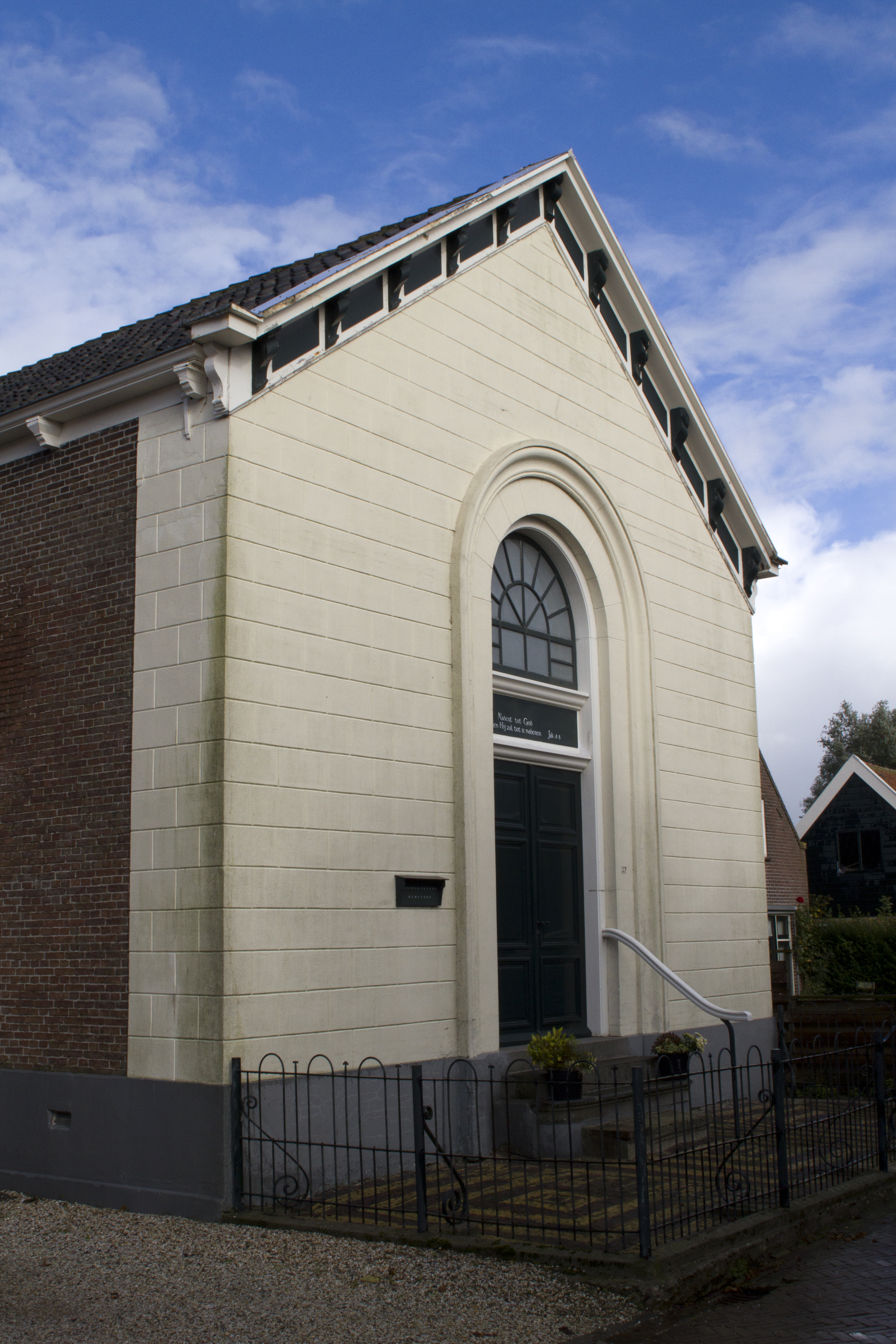
Mennonite church

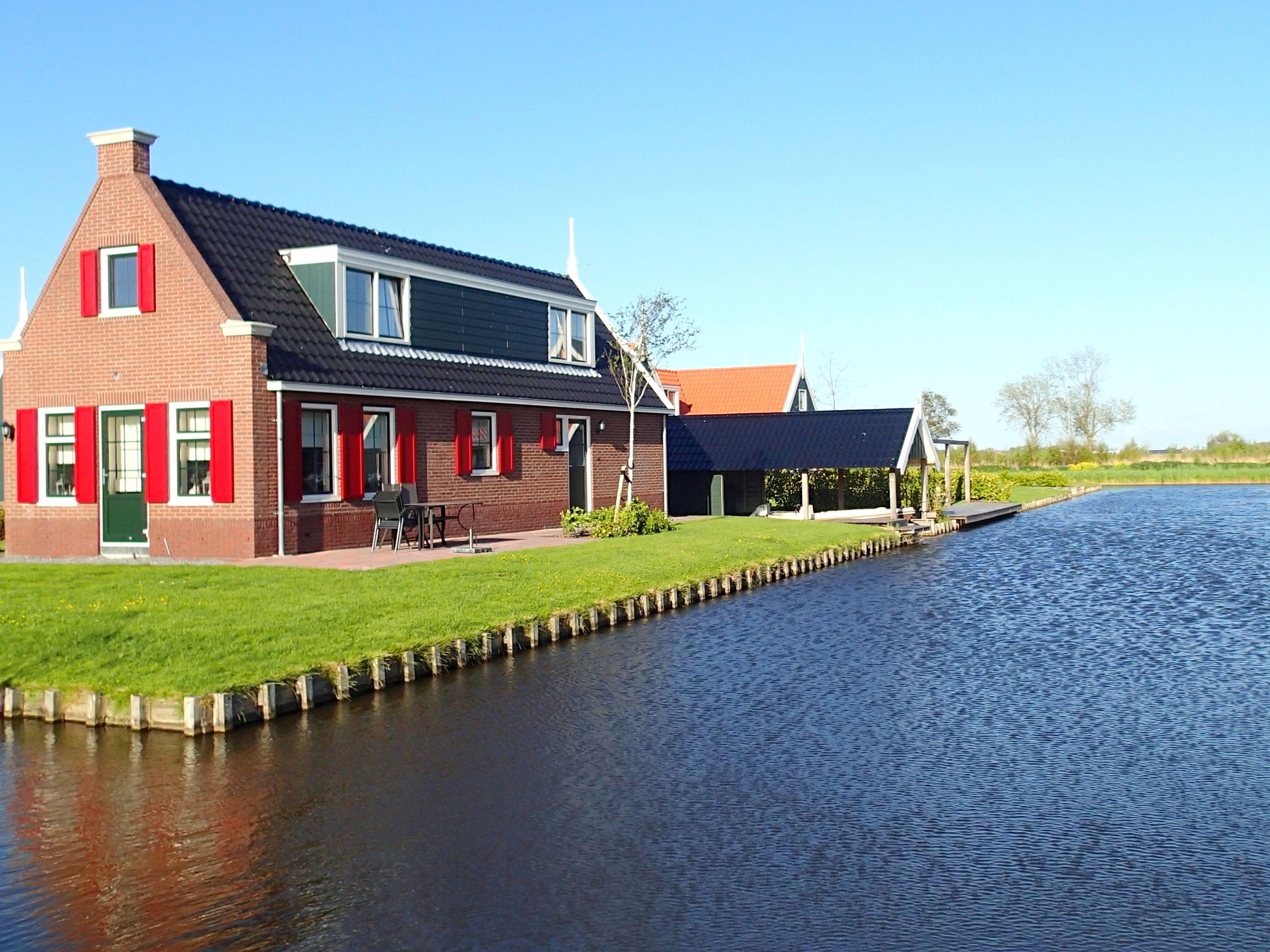
House in Oost-Graftdijk

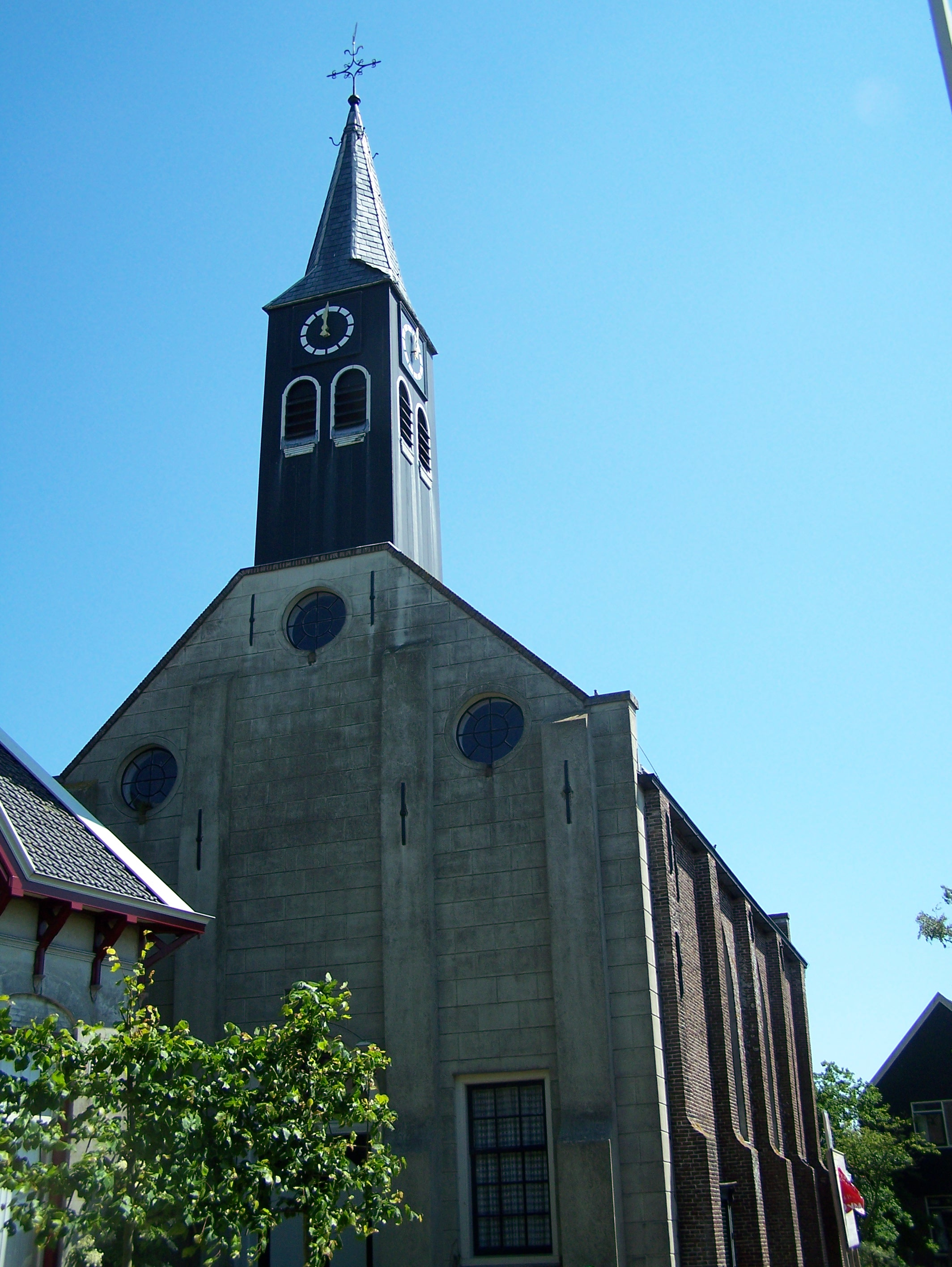
Dutch Reformed church

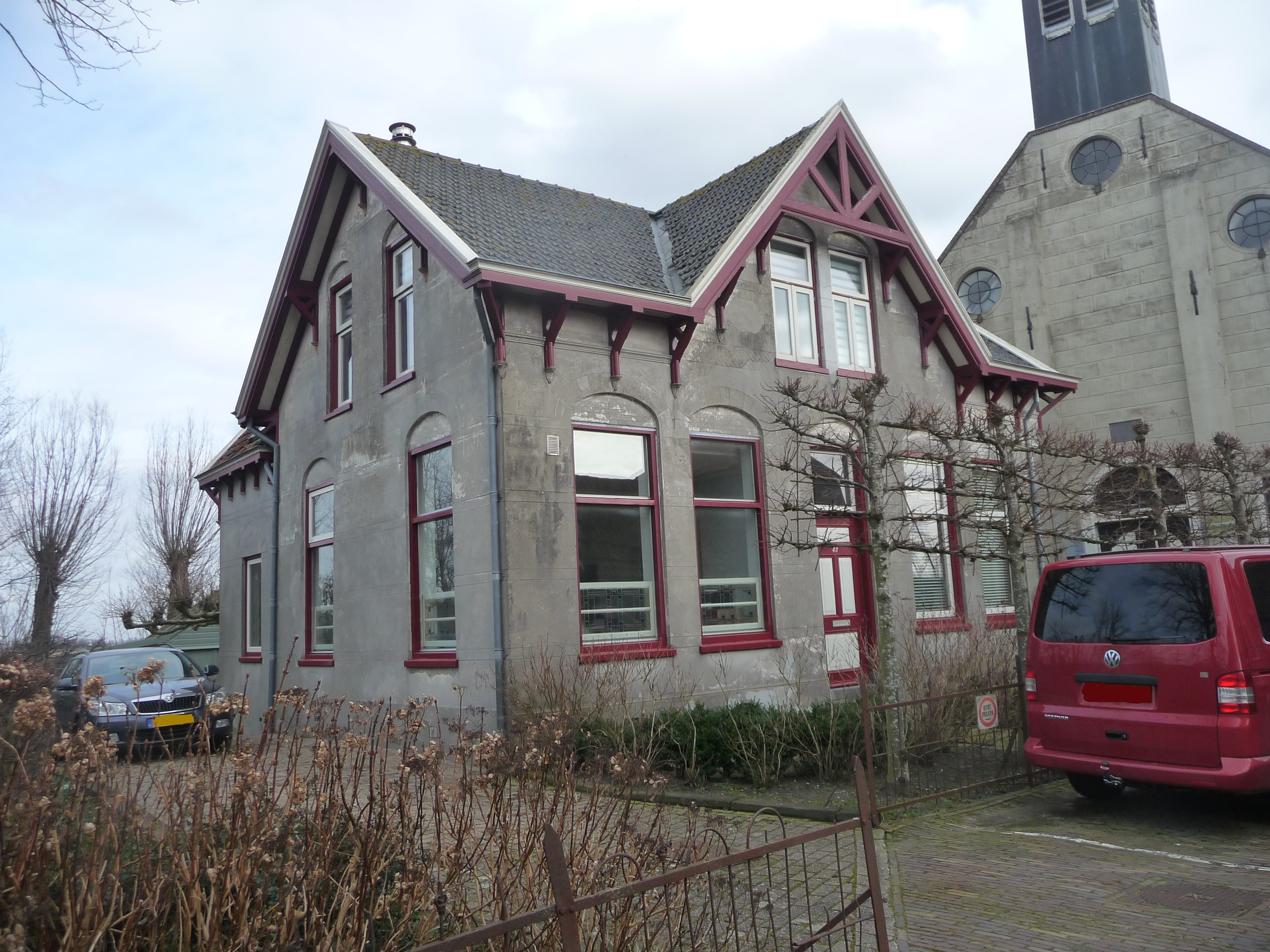
House in Oost-Graftdijk
