= West-Graftdijk =

- Village
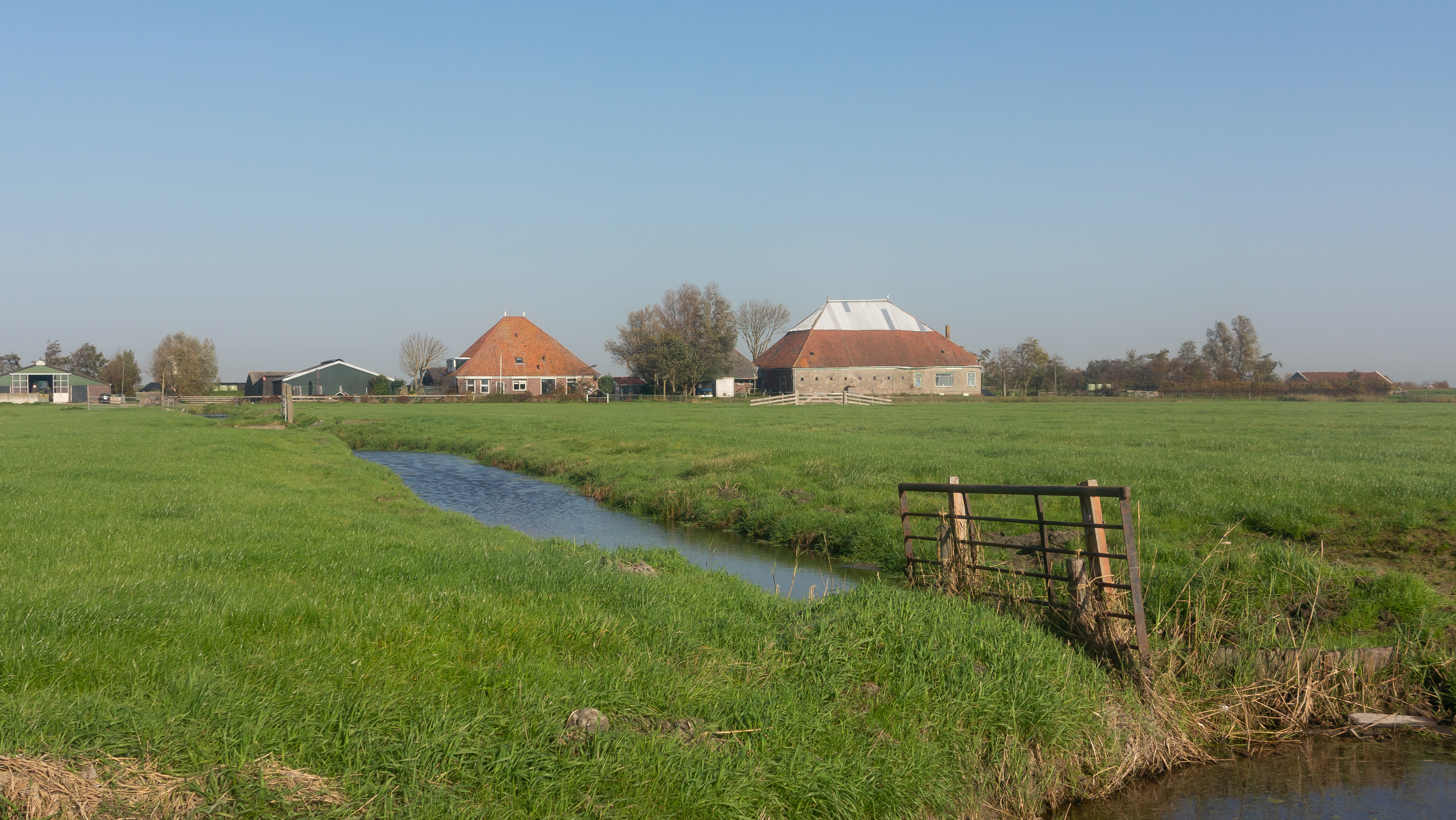
- Farm houses at the Dwarsweg and Ringdijk

- Location in the Netherlands Location in the province of North Holland in the Netherlands
- Coordinates: 52°33′N 4°48′E
- Country: Netherlands
- Province: North Holland
- Municipality: Alkmaar

Area
  - Total: 3.01 km^{2} (1.16 sq mi)
- Elevation: −1.7 m (−5.6 ft)

Population (2021)
  - Total: 745
  - Density: 248/km^{2} (641/sq mi)
- Time zone: UTC+1 (CET)
  - Summer (DST): UTC+2 (CEST)
- Postal code: 1486
- Dialing code: 072

West-Graftdijk is a village in the Dutch province of North Holland. It is a part of the municipality of Alkmaar, and lies about 10 km south of the city of Alkmaar. The village has a small historical church, and to the north there is the bird area Eilandspolder.

== History ==
The village was first mentioned in 1578 as "Graefdyeck ofte Vuylen Graft", and means "dike on (de Vuylen) Graft River". West- has been added to distinguish from Oost-Graftdijk. West-Graftdijk developed on the former island Schermereiland in the second half of the 16th century after a dike was built around the lake.

The Dutch Reformed church is an aisleless church with wooden tower which was built on a terp (artificial living hill) in 1651. The church was extensively modified in 1792. West-Graftdijk was home to 465 people in 1840.

== Gallery ==
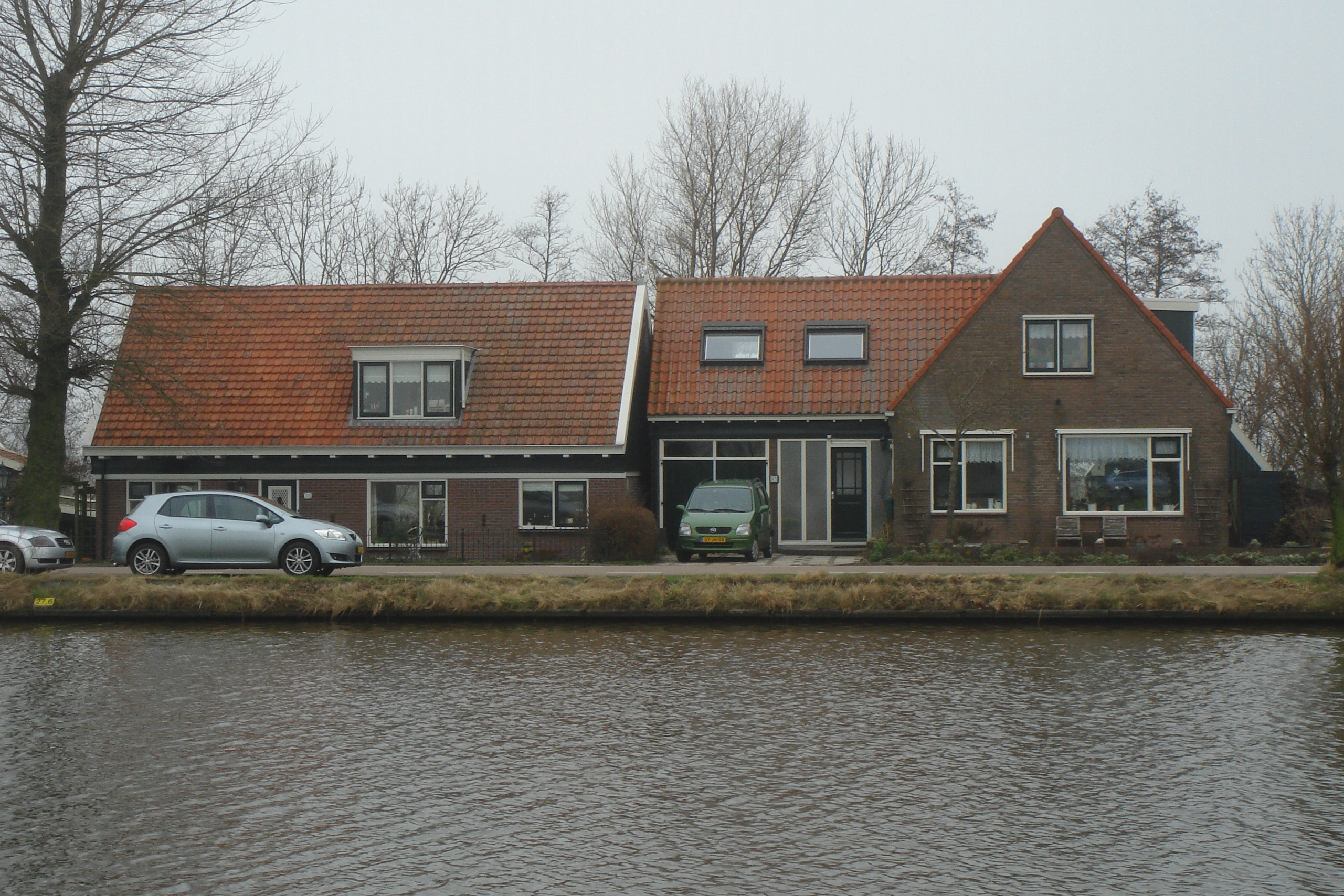
Farm in West-Graftdijk

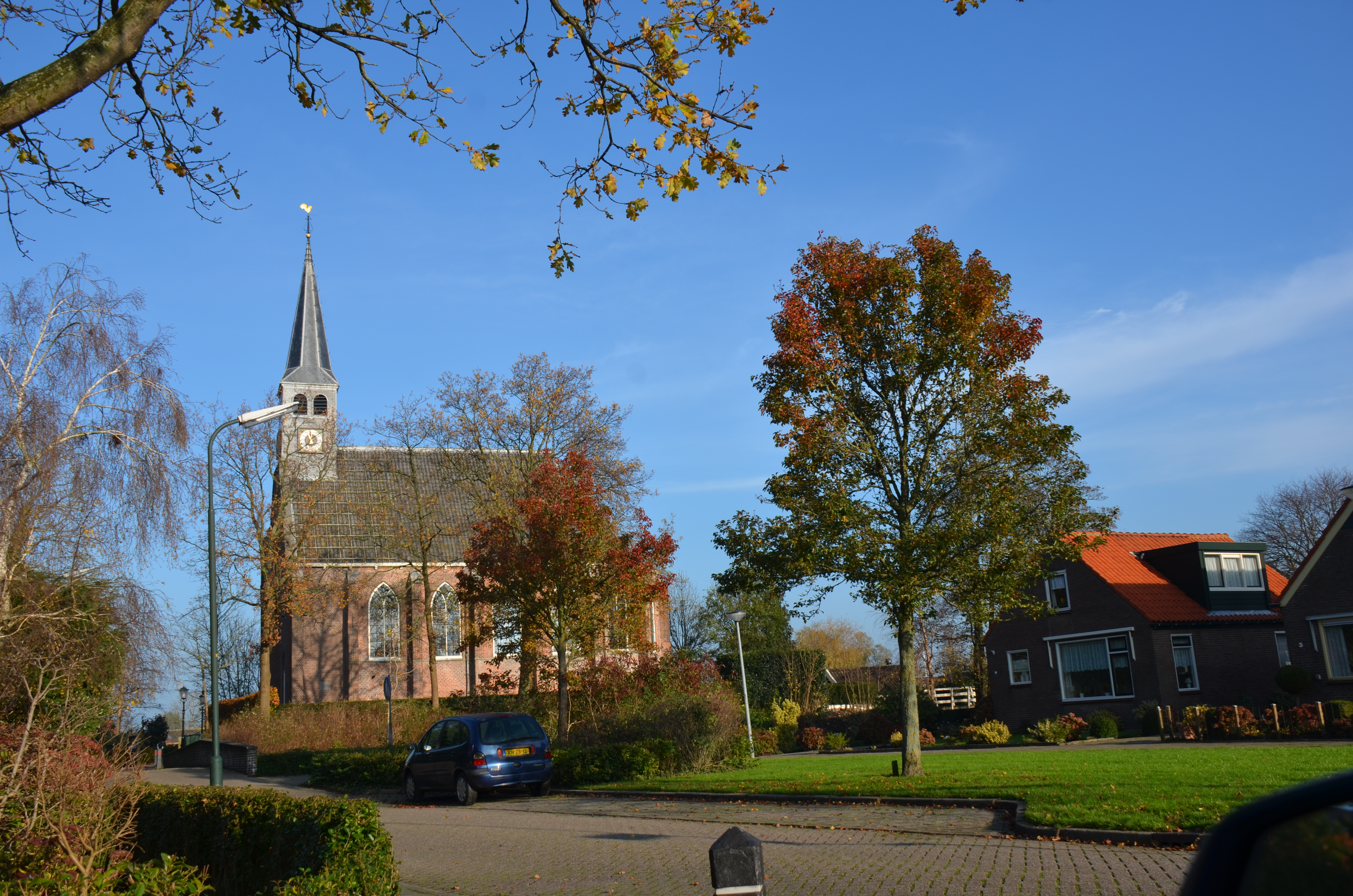
Dutch Reformed church

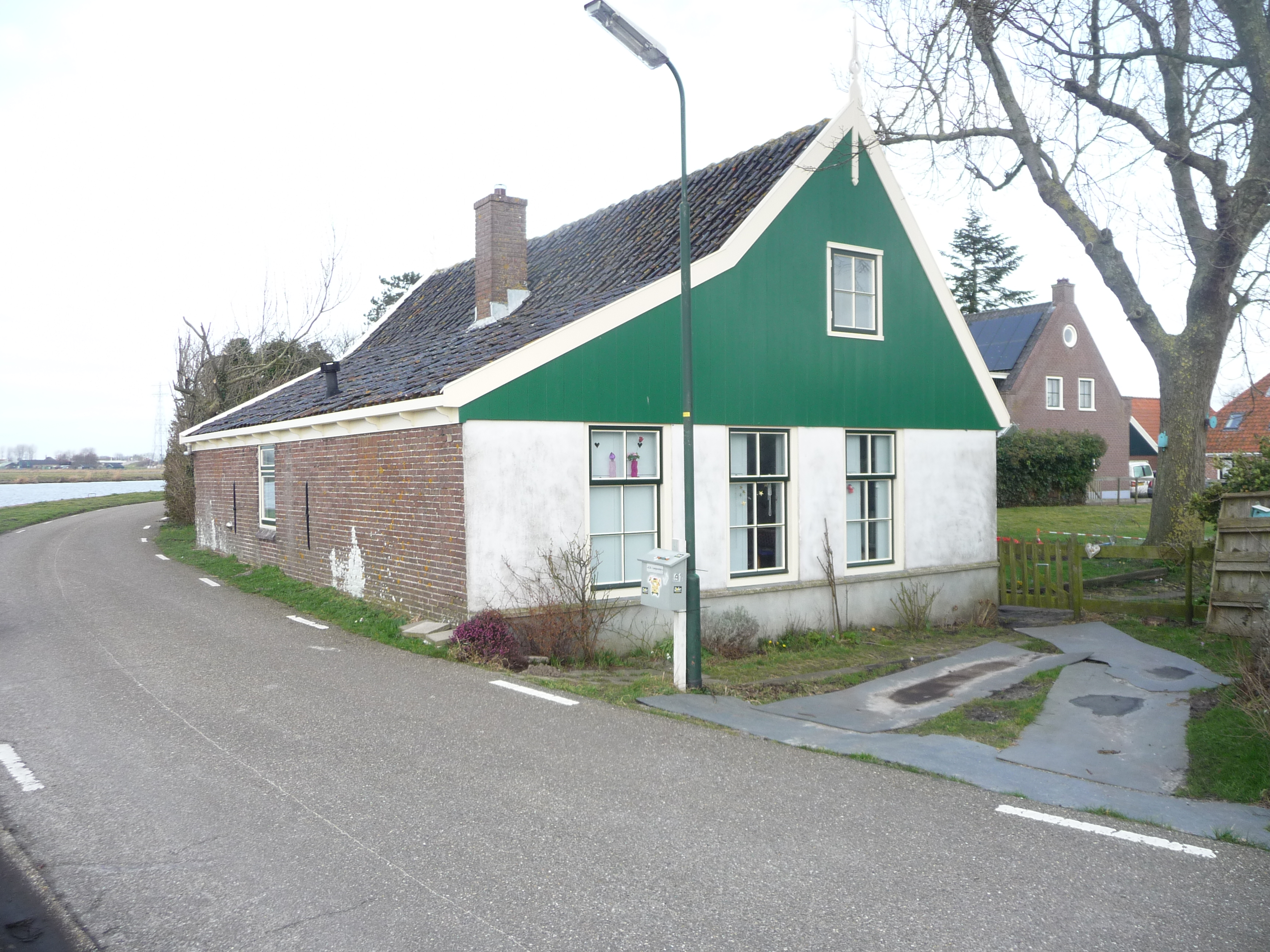
House in West-Graftdijk

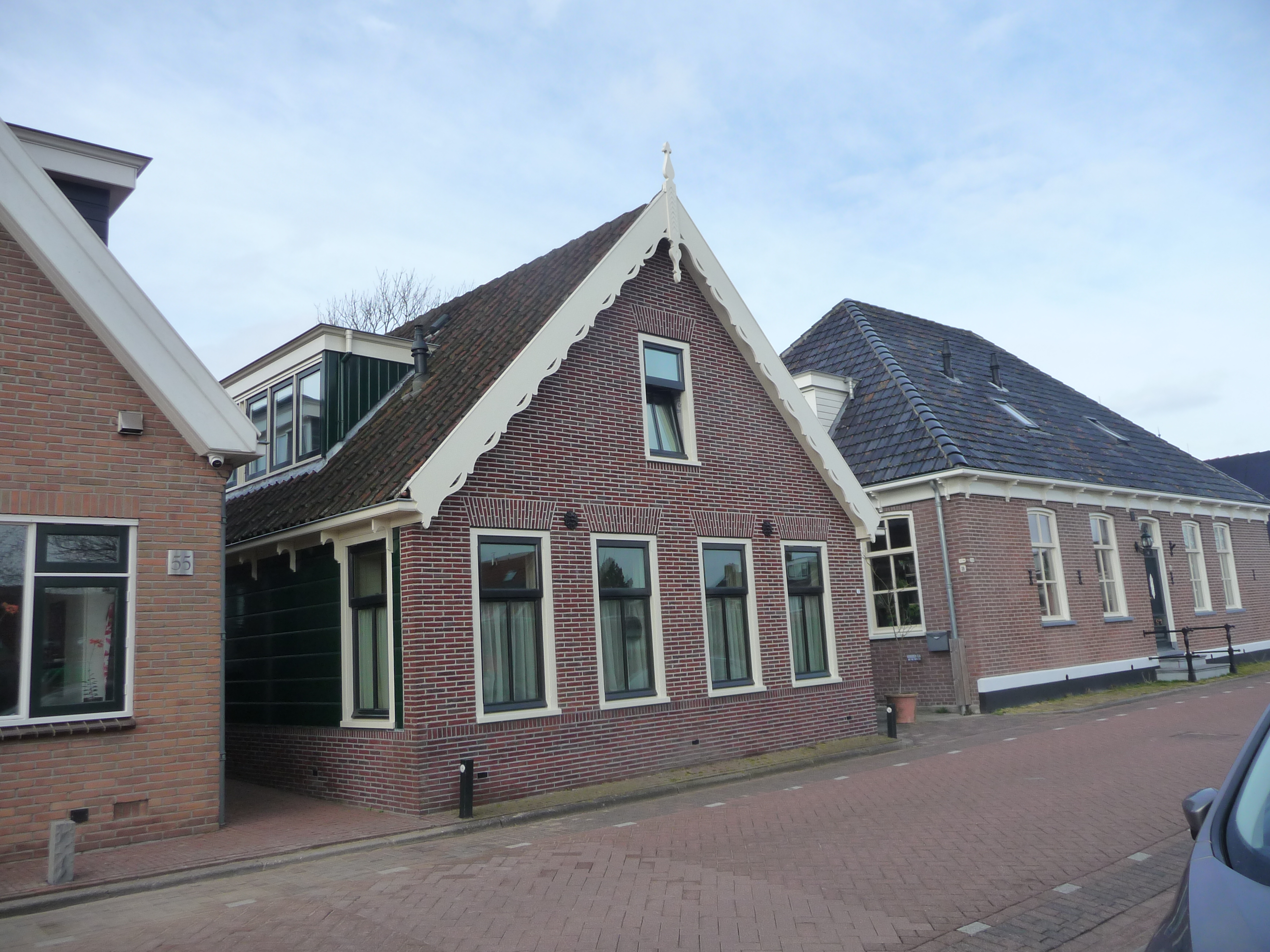
Houses in West-Graftdijk
