= Jan Leeghwater =

Dutch millwright and engineer (1575–1650)

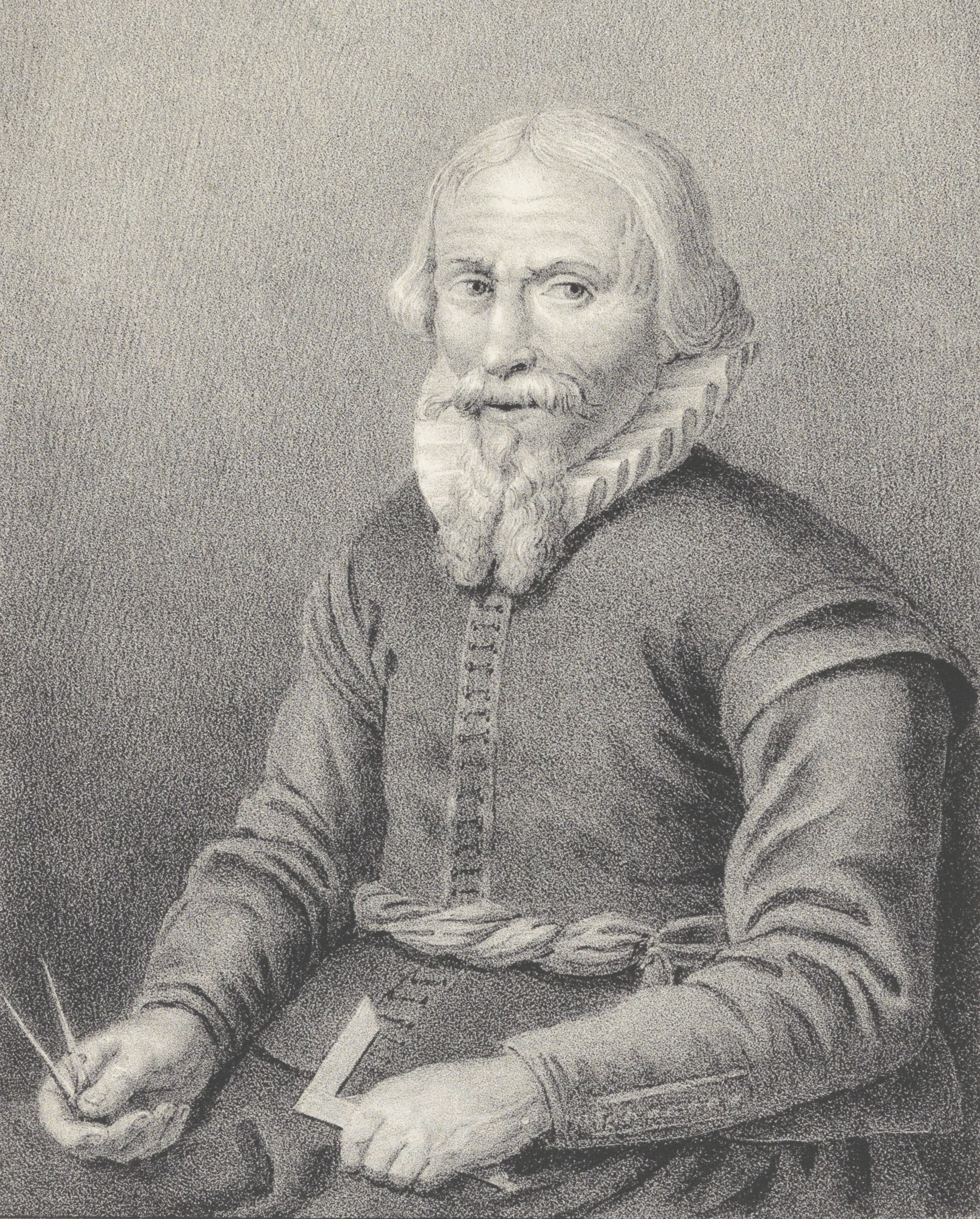
Posthumous engraving

Jan Adriaenszoon Leeghwater (born Jan Adriaenszoon; November 1575 – January 1650) was a Dutch millwright and hydraulic engineer.

== Biography ==
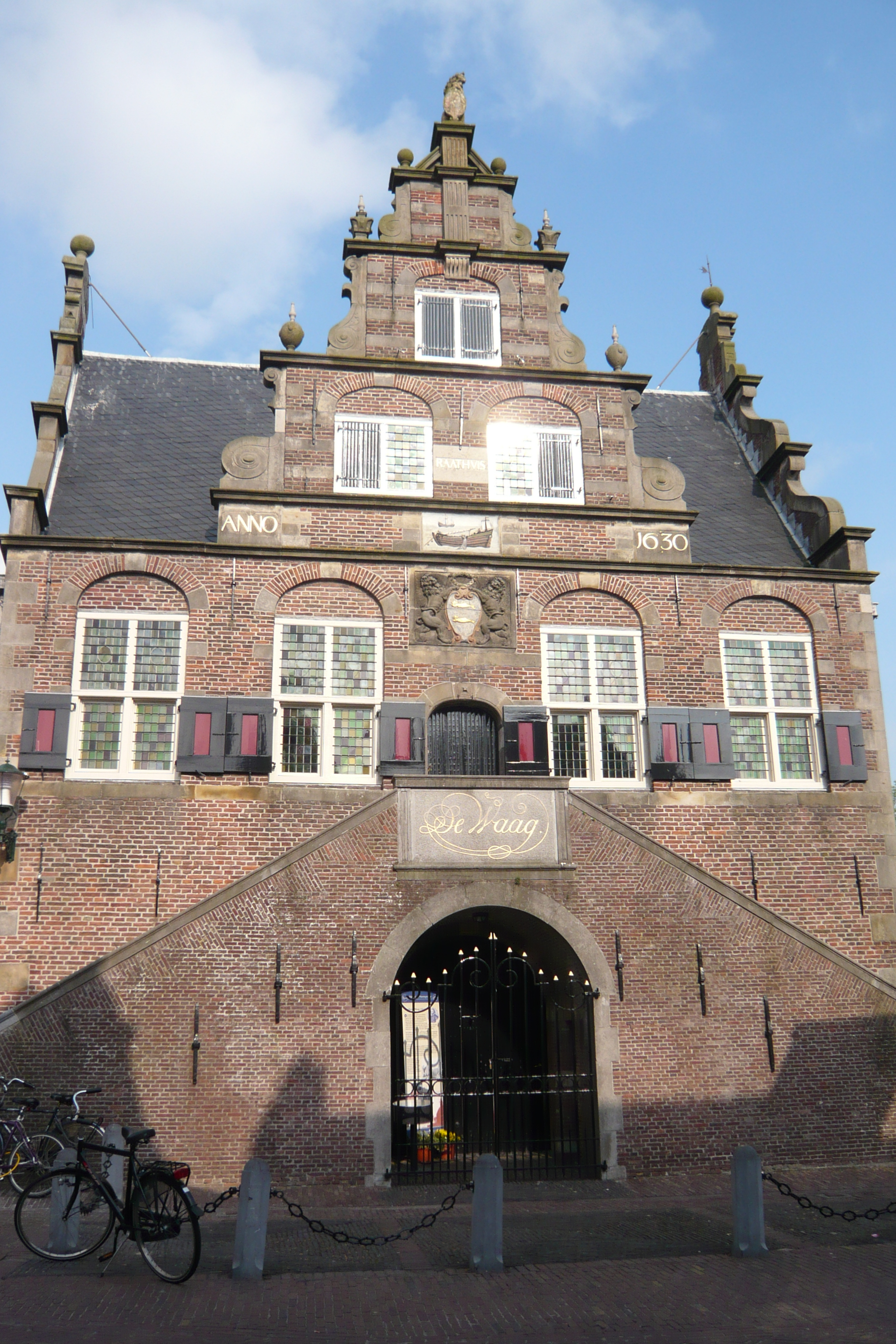
City hall of Graft-De Rijp, designed by Leeghwater in 1630

Leeghwater was born as Jan Adriaanszoon. Only later did he adopt the name Leeghwater, from laag water or low water. It is not clear exactly how the prevalent spelling of Leeghwater's name came about. Leeghwater himself spelt his name alternatively as Leegwater, Leegh-water, Leeghwater and Leechwater. Official documents of the time also mention Laechwater and Laachwater. Leeghwater, as a hydraulic engineer, was pivotal to land reclamation programs along the flooded coast of the Netherlands. He was involved in the reclamation of the Beemster polder, the first polder in the world created from a lake by draining the water using wind mills. The reclamation of the Beemster was started in 1607 and Leeghwater supervised the milling. Between 1607 and 1635, the polders Purmer, Schermer and Heerhugowaard were also created under his supervision. He was also known for bell casting and clock making in the church towers in Amsterdam.

== Steam pump named after Leeghwater ==
Leeghwater was among the first to advocate reclamation of the Haarlemmermeer, a lake whose growth presented a danger to the surrounding towns (several villages were swallowed and even Amsterdam and Leiden were eventually threatened). When this was finally accomplished in 1852, it was with three large steam-driven pumping installations; one at Lijnden, Kaag, and Cruquius. The installation at Kaag, the Gemaal De Leeghwater, built with a steam engine in 1845 to pump water into the Kaag lake, was named after him. The other two men honored in this way were Frans Godard baron van Lynden van Hemmen, who wrote the 1821 book 'Verhandeling over de droogmaking van het Haarlemmermeer' with the 3-way steam pump reclamation plan, and Nicolaas Kruik, who wrote an early "water defence" plan in 1737 using windmills.

== Criticism ==
André Lehr's criticism in the article about the building of clocks and casting bells by Leeghwater emerges that many of the allegations that have been made in later life by Leeghwater, can't be beat. The biographer of Leeghwater, mr. J.G. de Roever wrote that Leeghwaeter was vain and a braggart. This was written on the basis of archival research. He had much less to do with the reclaimed land than he wanted us to believe. The historiography of the reclaimed land and mill construction was proposed in the 19th century rather romanticized where men apparently was in need of that time. In addition, it is almost certain that he never has cast bells, but left this casting to other bell founders. For the Zuidertoren in Amsterdam, he has probably used the older bells by Jacob Waghevens and Adriaan Steylaert which did service before in earlier days in the Oudekerkstoren also in Amsterdam. He reused them and for the Westertoren the bells were possibly cast at the then in Amsterdam working city bell founder Assuerus Koster. By this Koster there are still the hour and half hour strike clocks from 1636 in Amsterdam Westertoren. The clocks and bells that he supplied according to the archives for these towers will not have been of good quality, for less than thirty years later they were replaced by Jurriaan Spraeckel who worked together with François and Pieter Hemony in many places. Today there is no old clock or carillon by Leeghwater recovered.

== Bibliography ==
- Leeghwater, Jan Adriaensz - het Haarlemmermeerboek, Reprinted in Amsterdam 16 times from 1641.
- Leeghwater, Jan Adriaensz - De kleyne Cronyke, till 1865 reprinted in more languages
- Roever, J.G. de - Jan Adriaensz Leeghwater, Amsterdam 1944
- Lehr, André - Jan Adriaensz. Leeghwater en het klokkenspel. Article in "Klok en Klepel" het orgaan van de Nederlandse Klokkenspel Vereniging nr. 6 from 1965
- Bijtelaar, Mej. B.M., Bep, De zingende torens van Amsterdam, Amsterdam 1947 page. 141-146.
