= Graft, Netherlands =

Graft
- Village
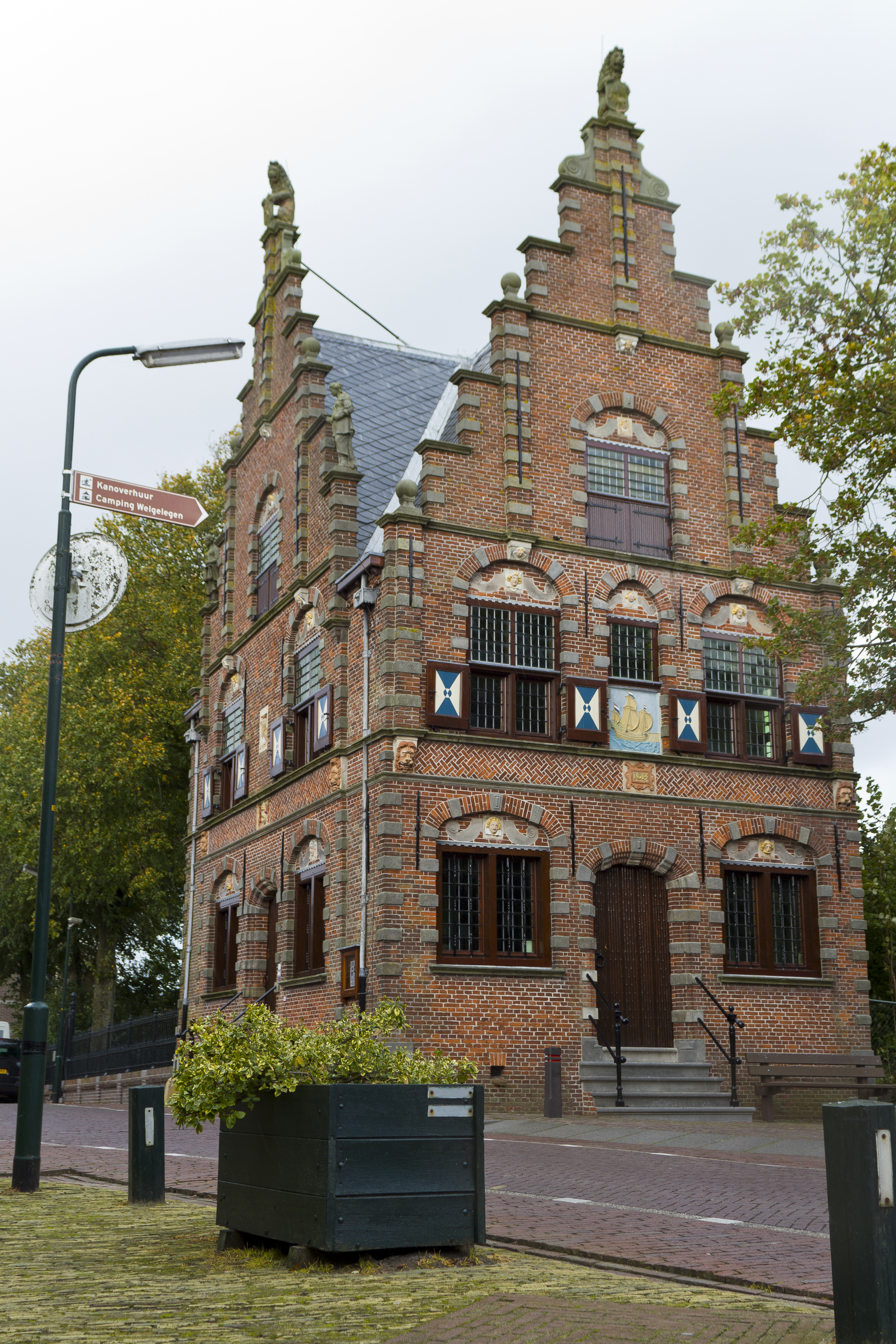
- Town hall of Graft in the style of Hendrick de Keyser, built in 1613

- Flag Coat of arms

- Location in the Netherlands Location in the province of North Holland in the Netherlands
- Coordinates: 52°34′N 4°50′E
- Country: Netherlands
- Province: North Holland
- Municipality: Alkmaar

Area
  - Total: 3.73 km^{2} (1.44 sq mi)
- Elevation: −2.0 m (−6.6 ft)

Population (2021)
  - Total: 890
  - Density: 240/km^{2} (620/sq mi)
- Time zone: UTC+1 (CET)
  - Summer (DST): UTC+2 (CEST)
- Postal code: 1484
- Dialing code: 0299

Graft (Dutch pronunciation: [ɣrɑft]) is a village in the Dutch province of North Holland. It is a part of the municipality of Alkmaar, and lies about 11 km (6.8 mi) south of the city of Alkmaar.

The village was first mentioned in the 12th century as Greft, and means "dug waterway". Graft developed in the 13th century on the former island of Schermereiland after it had been enclosed with a dike.

The former town hall is a stepped gable building in mannerist style from 1613.

Graft was home to 458 people in 1840. It was a separate municipality until 1970, when it merged with De Rijp. In 2015, it became part of the municipality of Alkmaar.

== Gallery ==
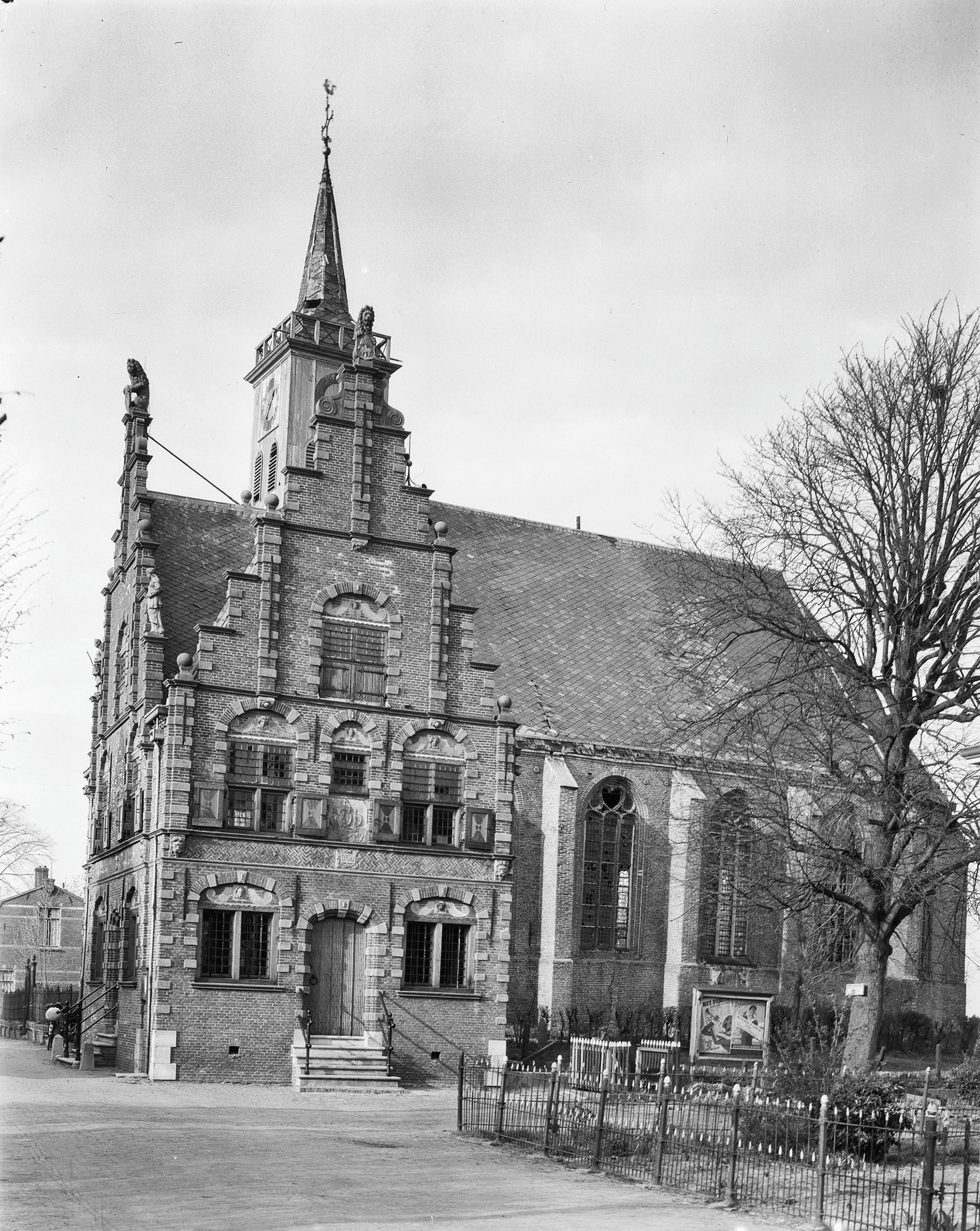
Former church of Graft behind the town hall (built in 1649) before it was deconstructed in 1951

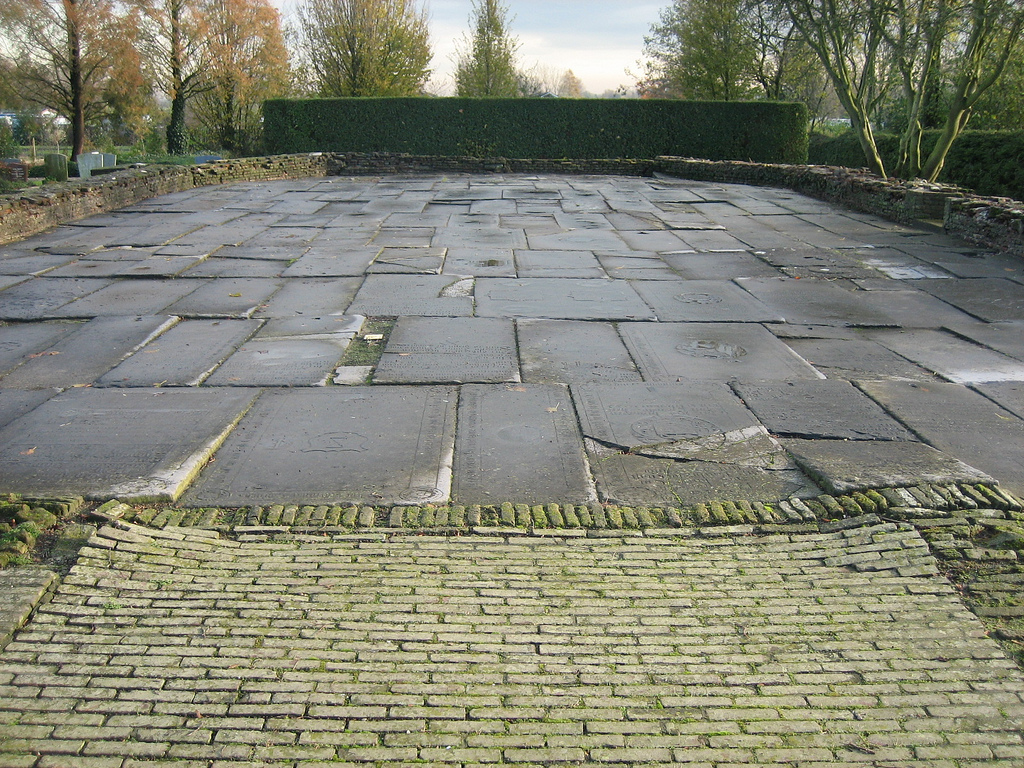
The old church floor remains

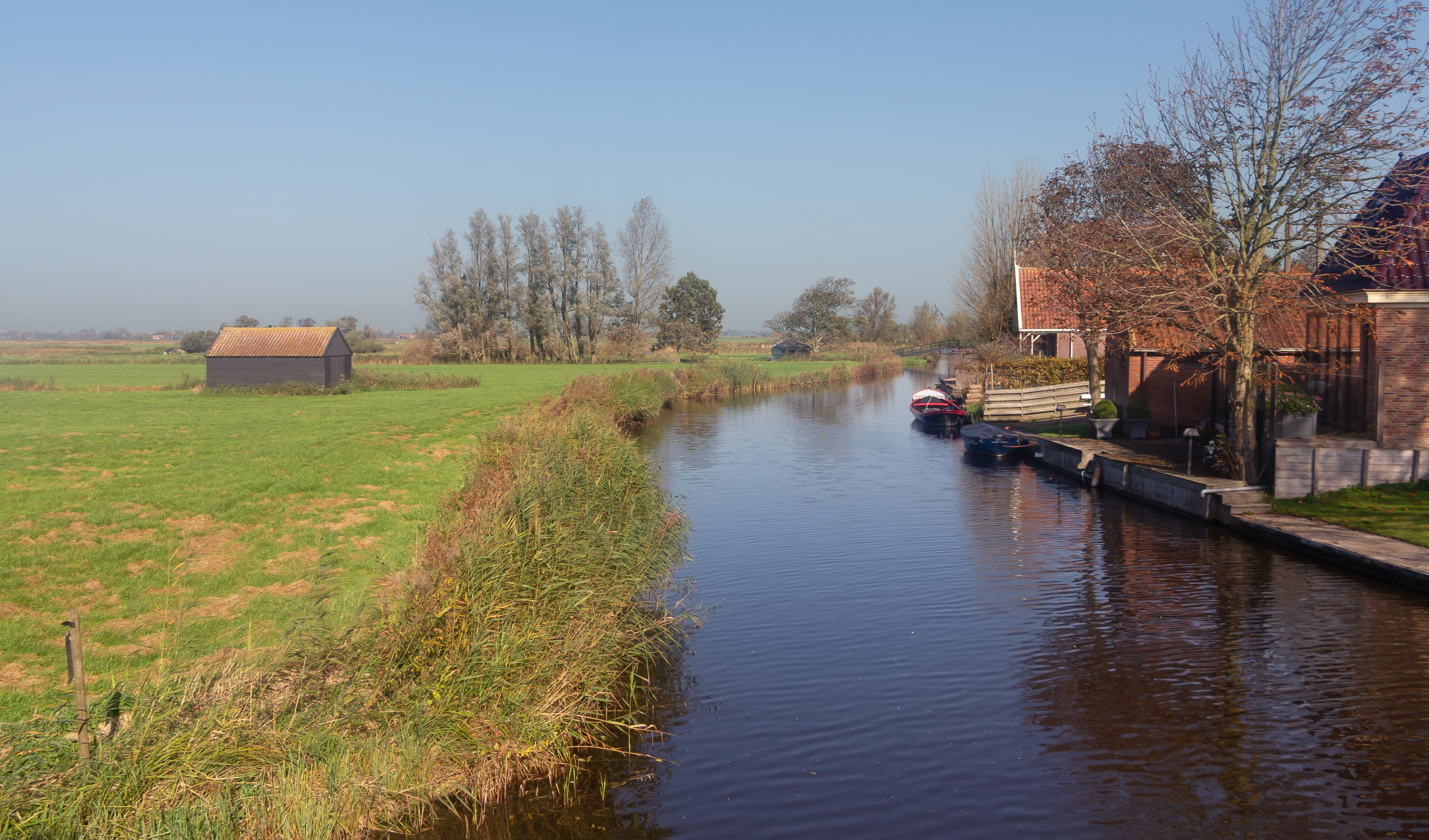
Ditch in the polder near Graft
