= Noordeinde, Alkmaar =

Noordeinde
- Village
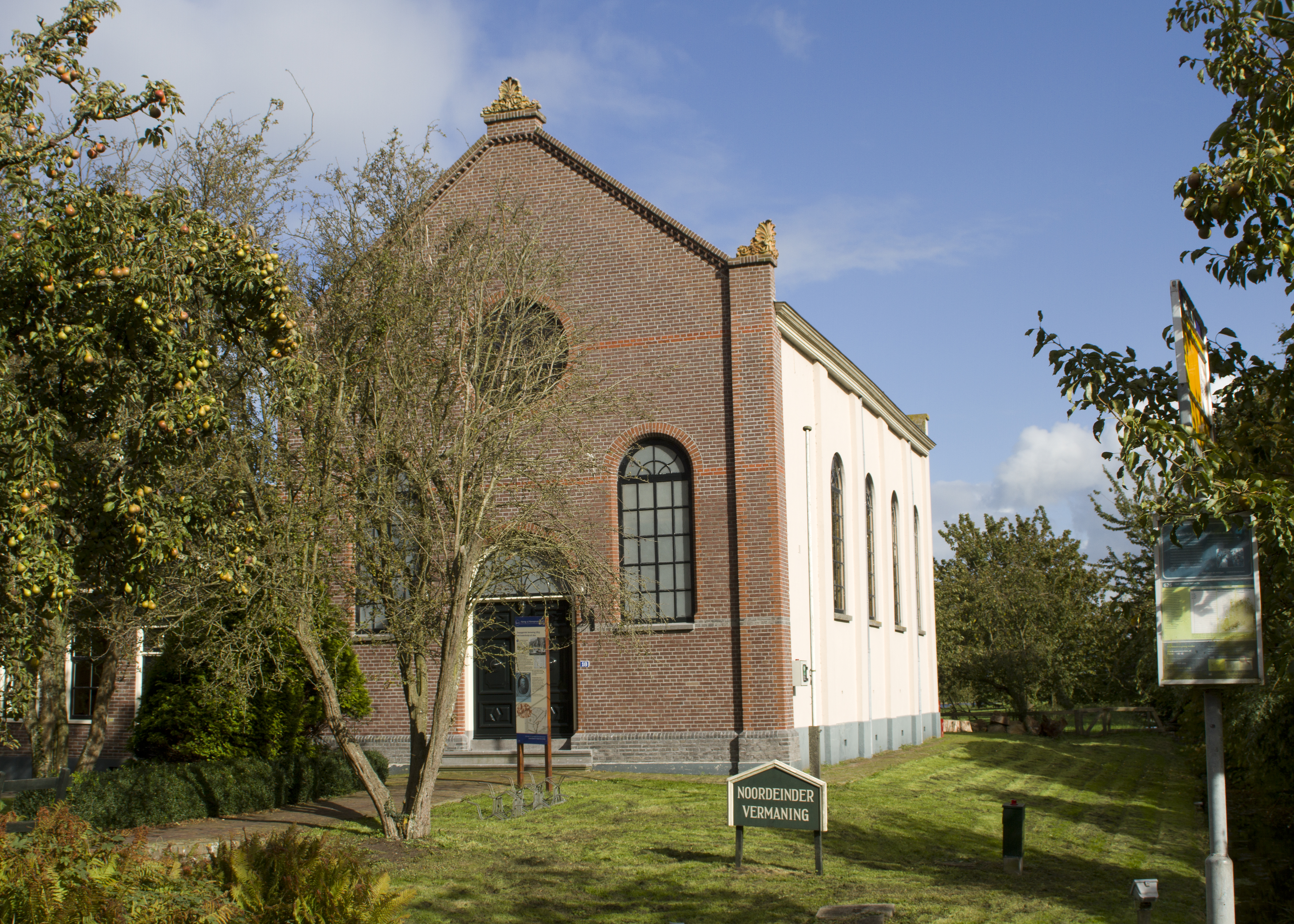
- Mennonite church

- Location in the Netherlands Location in the province of North Holland in the Netherlands
- Coordinates: 52°34′N 4°50′E
- Country: Netherlands
- Province: North Holland
- Municipality: Alkmaar

Area
  - Total: 1.50 km^{2} (0.58 sq mi)
- Elevation: −1.4 m (−4.6 ft)

Population (2021)
  - Total: 80
  - Density: 53/km^{2} (140/sq mi)
- Time zone: UTC+1 (CET)
  - Summer (DST): UTC+2 (CEST)
- Postal code: 1485
- Dialing code: 0299

Noordeinde is a village in the Dutch province of North Holland. It is a part of the municipality of Alkmaar, and lies about 10 km southeast of the city of Alkmaar.

The village was first mentioned in 1494 as "tNoorteynde van Schermer", and means "northern end". In 1655, a Mennonite church was built in the village. In 1874, it was replaced by a stone church. It was decommissioned in 1981, and is now a cultural centre. Noordeinde was home to 211 people in 1840.

== Gallery ==
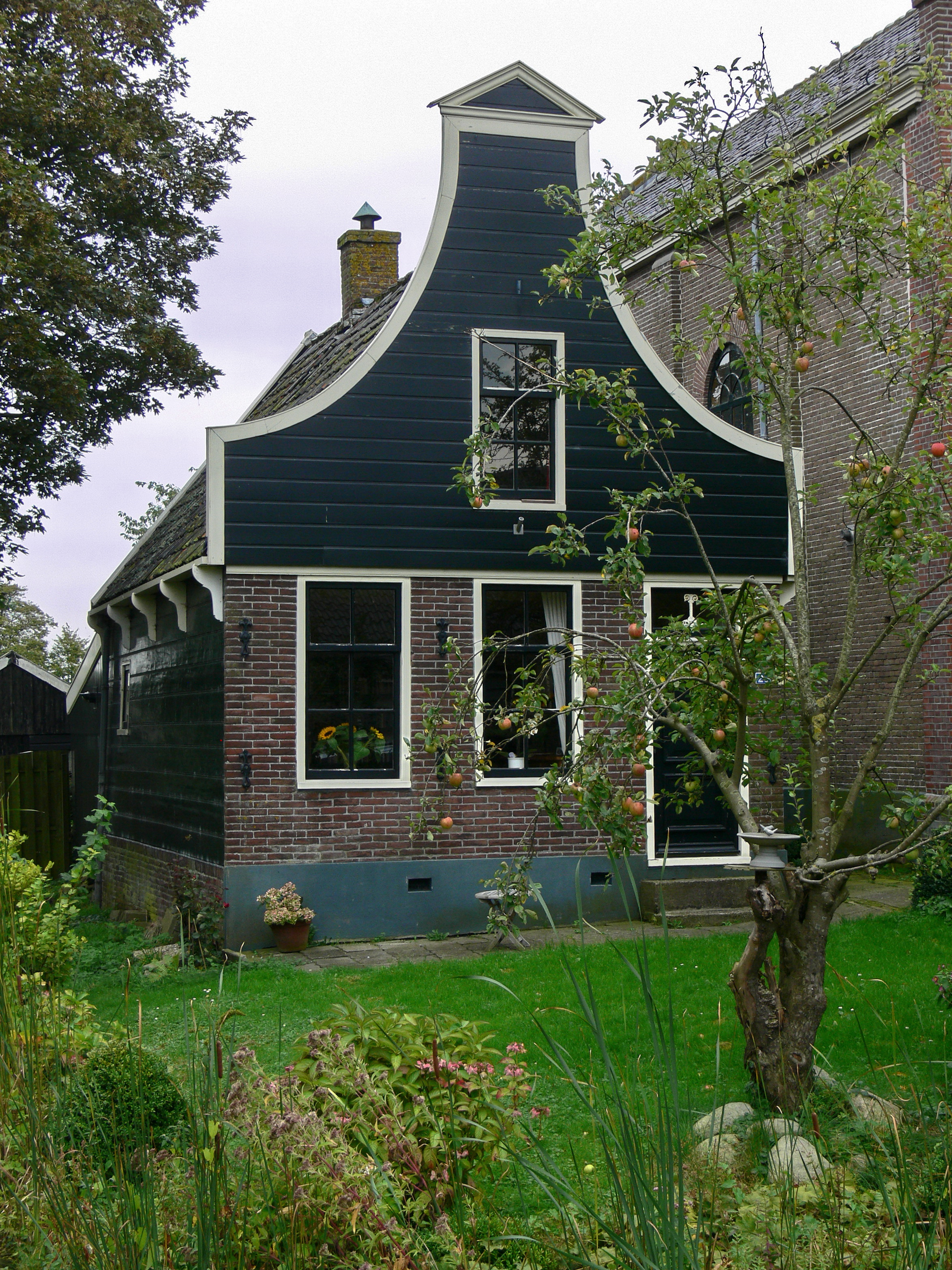
House in Noordeinde

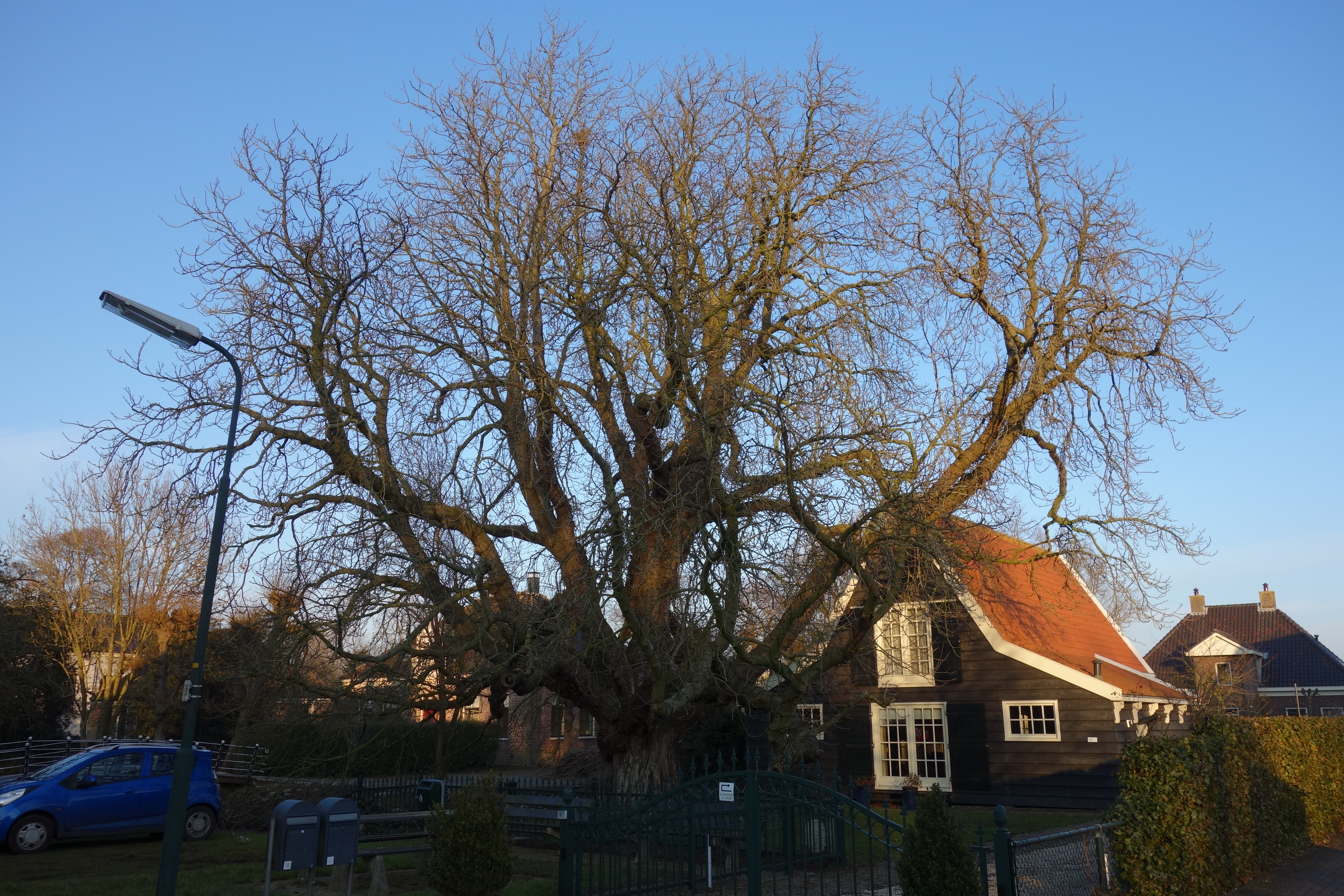
Chestnut tree

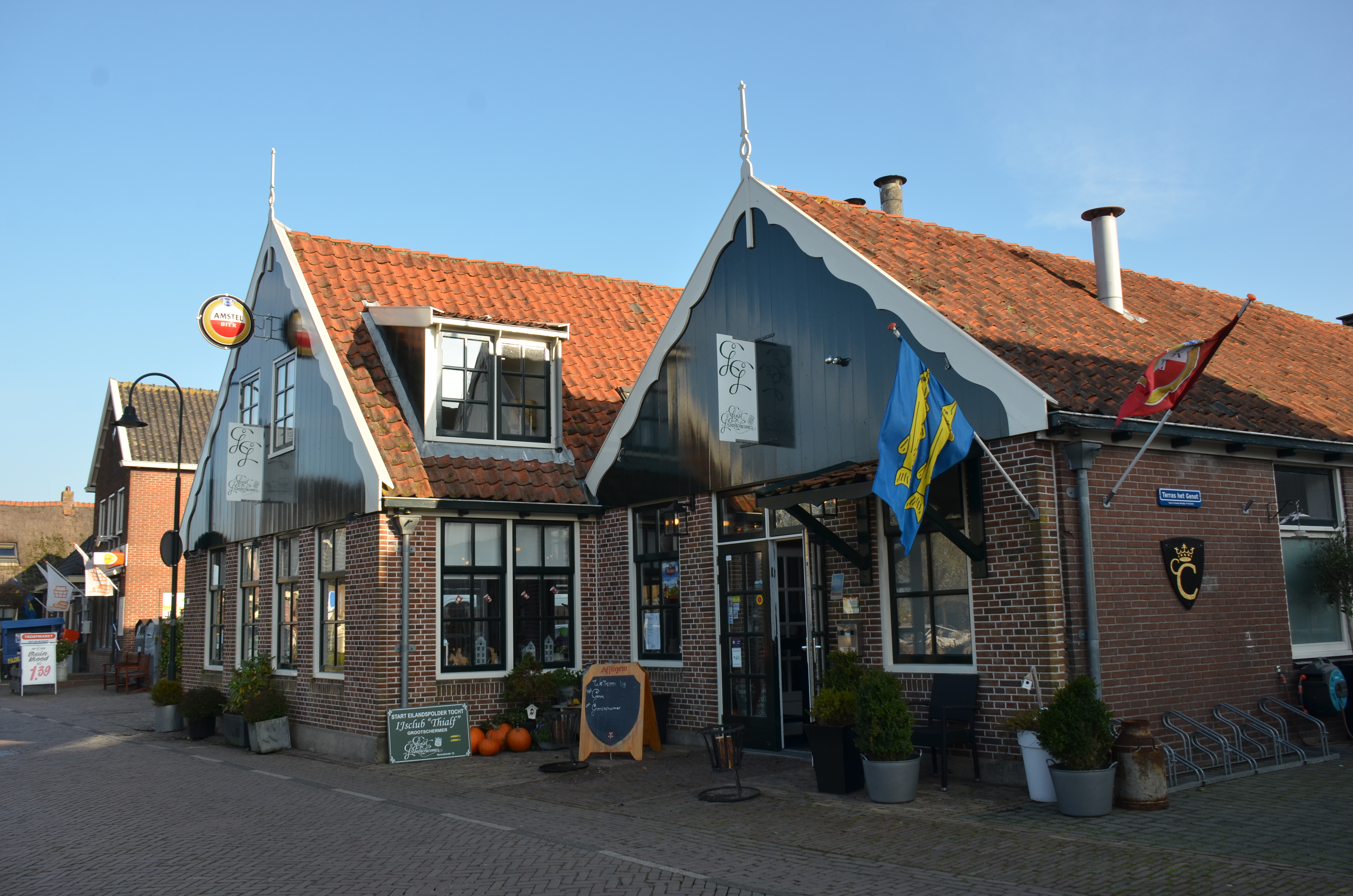
Restaurant in Noordeinde

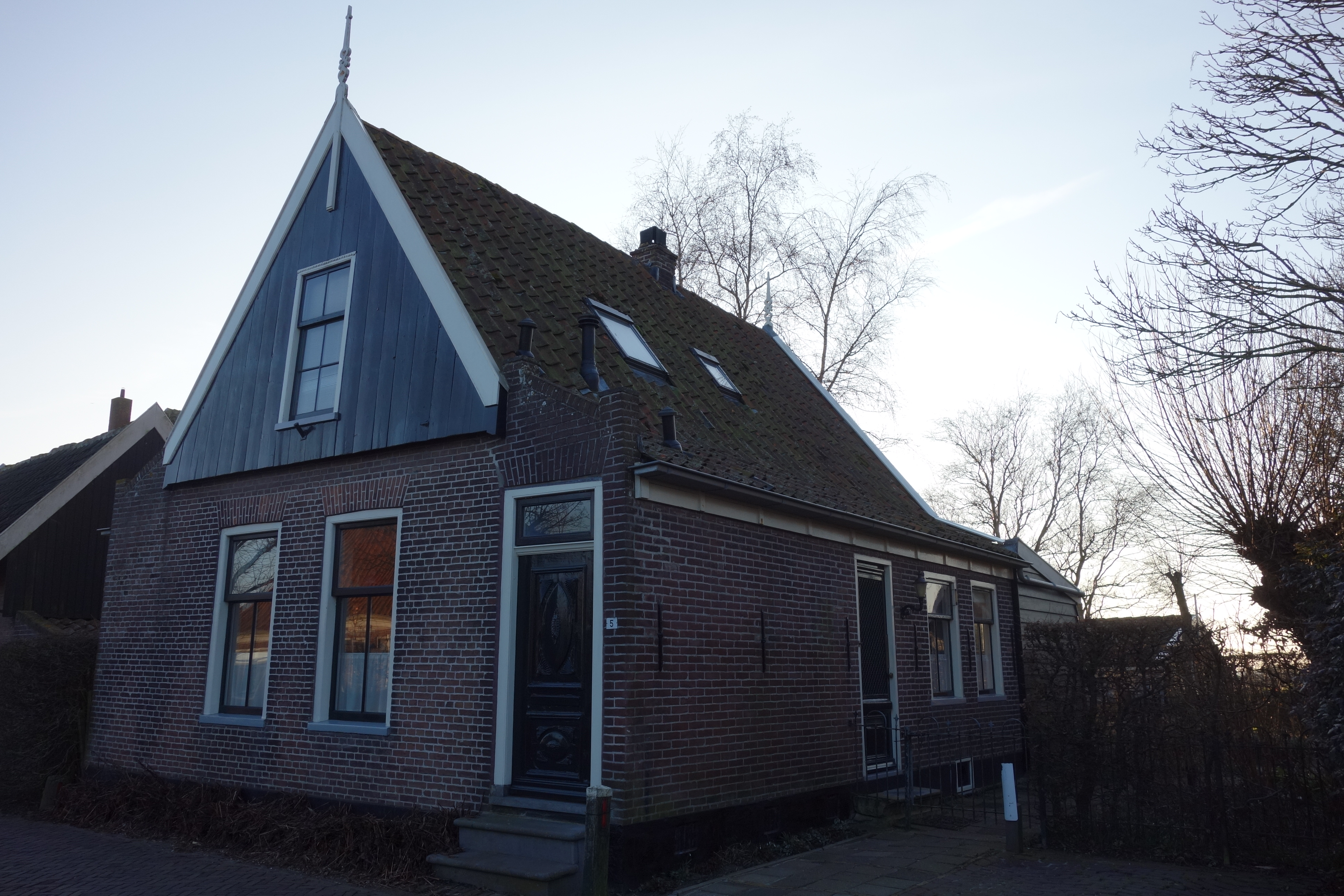
House in Noordeinde
