= List of cities, towns and villages in North Holland =

This is a list of settlements in the province of North Holland, in the Netherlands.

Name	Municipality	Coordinates	
Aagtdorp	Bergen	52°41′N 4°42′E	
Aalsmeer	Aalsmeer	52°16′N 4°46′E	
Aalsmeerderbrug	Haarlemmermeer	52°16′N 4°45′E	
Aartswoud	Opmeer	52°45′N 4°57′E	
Abbekerk	Medemblik	52°44′N 5°01′E	
Abbenes	Haarlemmermeer	52°14′N 4°36′E	
Abbestede	Schagen	52°51′N 4°43′E	
Aerdenhout	Bloemendaal	52°22′N 4°36′E	
Akersloot	Castricum	52°34′N 4°44′E	
Alkmaar	Alkmaar	52°38′N 4°45′E	
Amstelveen	Amstelveen	52°18′N 4°52′E	
Amsterdam	Amsterdam	52°21′N 4°55′E	
Andijk	Medemblik	52°45′N 5°13′E	
Ankeveen	Wijdemeren	52°16′N 5°06′E	
Ankeveense Rade	Wijdemeren	52°15′N 5°07′E	
Anna Paulowna	Hollands Kroon	52°52′N 4°52′E	
Assendelft	Zaanstad	52°28′N 4°45′E	
Assum	Uitgeest	52°31′N 4°42′E	
Avenhorn	Koggenland	52°37′N 4°57′E	
Axwijk	Edam-Volendam	52°32′N 5°01′E	
Baarsdorpermeer	Koggenland	52°40′N 5°00′E	
Badhoevedorp	Haarlemmermeer	52°20′N 4°47′E	
Bakkum	Castricum	52°34′N 4°40′E	
Bangert	Medemblik	52°44′N 5°11′E	
Bargen	Texel	53°05′N 4°50′E	
Barsingerhorn	Hollands Kroon	52°47′N 4°51′E	
Beets	Edam-Volendam	52°35′N 4°59′E	
Belt	Hollands Kroon	52°54′N 4°57′E	
Bennebroek	Bloemendaal	52°19′N 4°36′E	
Benningbroek	Medemblik	52°42′N 5°02′E	
Bentveld	Zandvoort	52°22′N 4°35′E	
Bergen	Bergen	52°40′N 4°42′E	
Bergen aan Zee	Bergen	52°40′N 4°38′E	
Berkhout	Koggenland	52°38′N 5°00′E	
Berkmeer	Koggenland, Opmeer	52°41′N 4°54′E	
Beverwijk	Beverwijk	52°29′N 4°39′E	
Bijvanck	Blaricum	52°17′N 5°17′E	
Bikbergen	Huizen	52°17′N 5°12′E	
Binnenwijzend	Drechterland	52°41′N 5°09′E	
Blaricum	Blaricum	52°17′N 5°15′E	
Blauwe Keet	Den Helder	52°54′N 4°47′E	
Bloemendaal	Bloemendaal	52°24′N 4°37′E	
Blokdijk	Drechterland	52°39′N 5°09′E	
Blokhuizen	Hollands Kroon	52°45′N 4°50′E	
Blokker	Hoorn, Drechterland	52°40′N 5°06′E	
Bobeldijk	Koggenland	52°39′N 5°00′E	
Boekel	Castricum	52°35′N 4°45′E	
Boerdijk	Medemblik	52°44′N 5°04′E	
Boesingheliede	Haarlemmermeer	52°22′N 4°43′E	
Bollendorp	Heiloo	52°35′N 4°41′E	
Bovenkarspel	Stede Broec	52°42′N 5°15′E	
Bovenkerk	Amstelveen	52°18′N 4°51′E	
Breezand	Hollands Kroon	52°53′N 4°48′E	
Bregtdorp	Bergen	52°43′N 4°41′E	
Broekerhaven	Stede Broec	52°42′N 5°15′E	
Broekhorn	Heerhugowaard	52°40′N 4°49′E	
Broek in Waterland	Waterland	52°26′N 5°00′E	
Broekoord	Medemblik	52°45′N 5°12′E	
Broek op Langedijk	Langedijk	52°40′N 4°49′E	
Buiksloot	Amsterdam	52°24′N 4°55′E	Former village; now part of Amsterdam
Buitenhuizen	Velsen	52°26′N 4°43′E	
Buitenkaag	Haarlemmermeer	52°13′N 4°34′E	
Burgerbrug	Schagen	52°45′N 4°42′E	
Burgerveen	Haarlemmermeer	52°14′N 4°41′E	
Burgervlotbrug	Schagen	52°45′N 4°41′E	
Busch en Dam	Uitgeest, Zaanstad	52°30′N 4°45′E	
Bussum	Gooise Meren	52°17′N 5°12′E	
Butterhuizen	Heerhugowaard	52°39′N 4°49′E	
't Buurtje	Schagen	52°48′N 4°45′E	
Callantsoog	Schagen	52°50′N 4°42′E	
Calslagen	Aalsmeer	52°14′N 4°44′E	
Camperduin	Bergen	52°44′N 4°39′E	
Castricum	Castricum	52°33′N 4°40′E	
Castricum aan Zee	Castricum	52°33′N 4°36′E	
Catrijp	Bergen	52°43′N 4°41′E	
Commandeurs	Heemskerk	52°31′N 4°39′E	
Craailo	Blaricum	52°16′N 5°12′E	
Cruquius	Haarlemmermeer	52°20′N 4°38′E	
Dam	Hollands Kroon	52°54′N 4°55′E	
De Banken	Uithoorn	52°13′N 4°46′E	
De Buurt	Medemblik	52°42′N 5°04′E	
De Cocksdorp	Texel	53°09′N 4°52′E	
De Gest	Hollands Kroon	52°56′N 5°01′E	
De Glip	Heemstede	52°20′N 4°37′E	
De Goorn	Koggenland	52°38′N 4°57′E	
De Haal	Zaanstad	52°28′N 4°53′E	
De Haukes	Hollands Kroon	52°53′N 4°56′E	
De Heid	Hollands Kroon	52°56′N 5°01′E	
De Heul	Zaanstad	52°27′N 4°52′E	
De Hoek	Haarlemmermeer	52°18′N 4°43′E	
De Hoelm	Hollands Kroon	52°54′N 4°57′E	
De Horn	Weesp	52°18′N 5°04′E	
De Hout	Drechterland	52°40′N 5°11′E	
De Hulk	Koggenland	52°38′N 5°01′E	
De Kampen	Hollands Kroon	52°45′N 4°52′E	
De Koog	Texel	53°06′N 4°46′E	
De Kooy	Den Helder	52°55′N 4°48′E	
De Kwakel	Uithoorn	52°14′N 4°48′E	
De Leijen	Hollands Kroon	52°44′N 4°52′E	
De Meent	Hilversum	52°17′N 5°12′E	New village, part of Hilversum.
Den Burg	Texel	53°03′N 4°48′E	
De Nes	Texel	53°05′N 4°52′E	
De Noord	Heerhugowaard	52°43′N 4°51′E	
De Rijp	Alkmaar	52°34′N 4°51′E	
De Strook	Hollands Kroon	52°48′N 4°54′E	
De Waal	Texel	53°04′N 4°49′E	
De Weed	Drechterland	52°39′N 5°13′E	
De Weel	Hollands Kroon	52°44′N 4°51′E	
De Weere	Opmeer	52°44′N 5°00′E	
De Weere	Hollands Kroon	52°46′N 4°53′E	
De Westen	Texel	53°03′N 4°45′E	
De Woude	Castricum	52°33′N 4°47′E	
De Zandloper	Den Helder	52°54′N 4°43′E	
Den Helder	Den Helder	52°58′N 4°46′E	
Den Hoorn	Texel	53°02′N 4°45′E	
Den Ilp	Waterland	52°27′N 4°55′E	
Den Oever	Hollands Kroon	52°56′N 5°02′E	
Diemen	Diemen	52°20′N 4°58′E	
Dijkmanshuizen	Texel	53°03′N 4°52′E	
Dirkshorn	Schagen	52°45′N 4°47′E	
Draai	Heerhugowaard	52°40′N 4°52′E	
Driehuis	Velsen	52°27′N 4°38′E	
Driehuizen	Alkmaar	52°35′N 4°49′E	
Driehuizen	Texel	53°03′N 4°47′E	
Driemolens	Hollands Kroon	52°50′N 4°51′E	
Driemond	Amsterdam	52°18′N 5°01′E	
Duin en Bosch	Castricum	52°34′N 4°39′E	
Duivendrecht	Ouder-Amstel	52°20′N 4°55′E	
Durgerdam	Amsterdam	52°23′N 5°00′E	
Dusseldorp	Castricum	52°34′N 4°42′E	
Edam	Edam-Volendam	52°31′N 5°03′E	
Eenigenburg	Schagen	52°44′N 4°44′E	
Egelshoek	Hilversum	52°11′N 5°09′E	
Egmond aan den Hoef	Bergen	52°37′N 4°39′E	
Egmond aan Zee	Bergen	52°37′N 4°38′E	
Egmond-Binnen	Bergen	52°36′N 4°39′E	
Elft	Hollands Kroon	52°54′N 4°59′E	
Enkhuizen	Enkhuizen	52°43′N 5°17′E	
Etersheim	Edam-Volendam	52°35′N 5°01′E	
Fort De Schans	Texel	53°02′N 4°49′E	
Frik	Heerhugowaard	52°43′N 4°52′E	
Gelderse Buurt	Hollands Kroon	52°53′N 4°48′E	
Geuzenbuurt	Medemblik	52°45′N 5°12′E	
Gouwe	Opmeer	52°44′N 4°58′E	
Graft	Alkmaar	52°34′N 4°50′E	
's-Graveland	Wijdemeren	52°14′N 5°07′E	
Groenveld	Schagen	52°46′N 4°47′E	
Groet	Bergen	52°43′N 4°40′E	
Groot Dorregeest	Uitgeest	52°32′N 4°44′E	
Grootebroek	Stede Broec	52°42′N 5°13′E	
Groote Keeten	Schagen	52°52′N 4°43′E	
Grootschermer	Alkmaar	52°35′N 4°51′E	
Grosthuizen	Koggenland	52°37′N 4°58′E	
Grotewal	Schagen	52°47′N 4°49′E	
Haaldersbroek	Zaanstad	52°29′N 4°50′E	
Haarlem	Haarlem	52°22′N 4°39′E	
Haarlemmerliede	Haarlemmerliede en Spaarnwoude	52°23′N 4°41′E	
Hakkelaarsbrug	Gooise Meren	52°19′N 5°06′E	
Halfweg	Haarlemmerliede en Spaarnwoude	52°23′N 4°45′E	
Halfweg	Beemster	52°32′N 4°56′E	
Harderwijk	Opmeer	52°44′N 5°00′E	
Harenkarspel	Schagen	52°44′N 4°47′E	Municipality; not a settlement.
Hargen	Bergen	52°43′N 4°40′E	
Haringhuizen	Hollands Kroon	52°46′N 4°50′E	
Harkebuurt	Texel	53°05′N 4°51′E	
Hauwert	Medemblik	52°43′N 5°06′E	
Havenbuurt	Waterland	52°27′N 5°06′E	
Heemskerk	Heemskerk	52°31′N 4°40′E	
Heemskerkerduin	Heemskerk	52°30′N 4°38′E	
Heemstede	Heemstede	52°21′N 4°37′E	
Heerhugowaard	Heerhugowaard	52°40′N 4°51′E	
Heiloo	Heiloo	52°36′N 4°42′E	
Hem	Drechterland	52°40′N 5°11′E	
Hembrug	Zaanstad	52°25′N 4°50′E	
Hensbroek	Koggenland	52°39′N 4°53′E	
Het Kalf	Zaanstad	52°28′N 4°50′E	
Het Korfwater	Schagen	52°47′N 4°40′E	
Het Schouw	Waterland	52°25′N 4°57′E	
Het Westeinde	Medemblik	52°45′N 5°04′E	
Het Woud	Bergen	52°39′N 4°40′E	
Hilversum	Hilversum	52°14′N 5°11′E	
Hinderdam	Wijdemeren	52°17′N 5°04′E	
Hippolytushoef	Hollands Kroon	52°54′N 4°58′E	
Hobrede	Edam-Volendam	52°33′N 4°59′E	
Hofgeest	Velsen	52°27′N 4°40′E	
Hogebieren	Hollands Kroon	52°46′N 4°51′E	
Hollands Kroon	Hollands Kroon	52°52′N 4°52′E	Municipality; not a settlement.
Hollandsch Ankeveen	Wijdemeren	52°17′N 5°07′E	
Hollebalg	Hollands Kroon	52°54′N 4°57′E	
Holysloot	Amsterdam	52°25′N 5°02′E	
Hoofddorp	Haarlemmermeer	52°18′N 4°42′E	
Hoogeberg	Texel	53°02′N 4°49′E	
Hoogkarspel	Drechterland	52°42′N 5°12′E	
Hoogwoud	Opmeer	52°43′N 4°56′E	
Hoorn	Hoorn	52°39′N 5°04′E	
't Horntje	Texel	53°00′N 4°47′E	
Horstermeer	Wijdemeren	52°15′N 5°05′E	
Huigsloot	Haarlemmermeer	52°13′N 4°36′E	
Huisduinen	Den Helder	52°57′N 4°44′E	
Huiswaard	Alkmaar	52°39′N 4°45′E	
Huizen	Huizen	52°18′N 5°14′E	
Huizerhoogt	Huizen	52°17′N 5°15′E	
IJmuiden	Velsen	52°28′N 4°36′E	
Ilpendam	Waterland	52°28′N 4°57′E	
Jisp	Wormerland	52°31′N 4°51′E	
Julianadorp	Den Helder	52°54′N 4°45′E	
Kabel	Haarlemmermeer	52°15′N 4°39′E	
Kabel	Heerhugowaard	52°39′N 4°51′E	
Kadoelen	Amsterdam	52°25′N 4°54′E	Former village; now part of Amsterdam.
Kalverdijk	Schagen	52°44′N 4°46′E	
Kapel	Heiloo	52°35′N 4°41′E	
Katham	Edam-Volendam, Waterland	52°29′N 5°04′E	
Kathoek	Koggenland	52°37′N 4°57′E	
Katwoude	Waterland	52°28′N 5°03′E	
Keinse	Schagen	52°48′N 4°48′E	
Keinsmerbrug	Schagen	52°49′N 4°47′E	
Kerkbuurt	Waterland	52°28′N 5°06′E	
Kerkbuurt	Schagen	52°44′N 4°46′E	
Klaterbuurt	Beemster	52°34′N 4°52′E	
Klein Dorregeest	Castricum	52°33′N 4°44′E	
Klein-Overleek	Waterland	52°27′N 4°59′E	
Koedijk	Alkmaar	52°40′N 4°45′E	
Kolhorn	Hollands Kroon	52°48′N 4°54′E	
Koog aan de Zaan	Zaanstad	52°28′N 4°48′E	
Koogerveld	Texel	53°06′N 4°47′E	
Kortenhoef	Wijdemeren	52°14′N 5°05′E	
Kraaienburg	Drechterland	52°38′N 5°09′E	
Krabbendam	Schagen	52°44′N 4°42′E	
Kriel	Hollands Kroon	52°48′N 4°52′E	
Kreileroord	Hollands Kroon	52°51′N 5°05′E	
Krommenie	Zaanstad	52°30′N 4°46′E	
Krommeniedijk	Zaanstad	52°31′N 4°46′E	
't Kruis	Heerhugowaard	52°39′N 4°51′E	
Kudelstaart	Aalsmeer	52°14′N 4°45′E	
Kwadijk	Edam-Volendam	52°32′N 4°59′E	
Lagedijk	Schagen	52°48′N 4°47′E	
Lambertschaag	Medemblik	52°45′N 5°01′E	
Landsmeer	Waterland	52°26′N 4°55′E	
Langedijk	Langedijk	52°42′N 4°49′E	Municipality; not a settlement.
Langeheit	Zaanstad	52°29′N 4°46′E	
Langereis	Opmeer, Hollands Kroon	52°44′N 4°55′E	
Laren	Laren	52°15′N 5°14′E	
Leekerweg	Drechterland	52°39′N 5°11′E	
Leihoek	Schagen	52°45′N 4°39′E	
Leimuiderbrug	Haarlemmermeer	52°14′N 4°40′E	
Lekermeer	Medemblik	52°40′N 5°01′E	
Lijnden	Haarlemmermeer	52°21′N 4°46′E	
Limmen	Castricum	52°34′N 4°41′E	
Limmerkoog	Castricum	52°33′N 4°43′E	
Lisserbroek	Haarlemmermeer	52°15′N 4°34′E	
Lutjebroek	Stede Broec	52°42′N 5°12′E	
Lutjewinkel	Hollands Kroon	52°46′N 4°53′E	
Markenbinnen	Uitgeest	52°32′N 4°47′E	
Medemblik	Medemblik	52°46′N 5°06′E	
Mennonietenbuurt	Schagen	52°45′N 4°41′E	
Middel	Zaanstad	52°29′N 4°46′E	
Middelie	Edam-Volendam	52°32′N 5°01′E	
Middenbeemster	Beemster	52°33′N 4°55′E	
Midden-Eierland	Texel	53°08′N 4°52′E	
Middenmeer	Hollands Kroon	52°48′N 5°00′E	
Midwoud	Medemblik	52°43′N 5°04′E	
Moeniswerf	Waterland	52°27′N 5°07′E	
Moerbeek	Hollands Kroon	52°46′N 4°51′E	
Molenbuurt	Medemblik	52°42′N 5°01′E	
Molenbuurt	Medemblik	53°05′N 4°51′E	
Monnickendam	Waterland	52°28′N 5°02′E	
Muiden	Gooise Meren	52°20′N 5°04′E	
Muiderberg	Gooise Meren	52°20′N 5°07′E	
Naarden	Gooise Meren	52°18′N 5°09′E	
Naardermeer	Weesp, Gooise Meren	52°19′N 5°06′E	
Nauerna	Zaanstad	52°27′N 4°45′E	
Neck	Wormerland	52°31′N 4°55′E	
Nederhorst den Berg	Wijdemeren	52°16′N 5°03′E	
Nes	Schagen	52°48′N 4°50′E	
Nes aan de Amstel	Amstelveen	52°16′N 4°53′E	
Nibbixwoud	Medemblik	52°42′N 5°04′E	
Niedorperverlaat	Hollands Kroon	52°43′N 4°51′E	
Niuwe Brug	Haarlemmermeer	52°22′N 4°40′E	
Nieuwe Meer	Haarlemmermeer	52°20′N 4°49′E	
Nieuwendam	Amsterdam	52°23′N 4°57′E	Former village; now part of Amsterdam
Nieuwe-Niedorp	Hollands Kroon	52°44′N 4°54′E	
Nieuweschild	Texel	53°05′N 4°53′E	
Niuwesluis	Hollands Kroon	52°50′N 4°54′E	
Nieuw-Vennep	Haarlemmermeer	52°16′N 4°38′E	
Nollen	Alkmaar	52°39′N 4°47′E	
Noord-Bakkum	Castricum	52°35′N 4°40′E	
Noordbeemster	Beemster	52°35′N 4°57′E	
Noordburen	Hollands Kroon	52°55′N 4°58′E	
Noorddijk	Koggenland	52°38′N 4°54′E	
Noorddorp	Heemskerk	52°32′N 4°39′E	
Noordeinde	Alkmaar	52°34′N 4°50′E	
Noorderbuurt	Hollands Kroon	52°54′N 4°56′E	
Noorderbuurt	Texel	53°05′N 4°51′E	
Noordermeer	Medemblik	52°41′N 4°59′E	
Noordhaffel	Texel	53°02′N 4°47′E	
Noord-Scharwoude	Langedijk	52°42′N 4°49′E	
Noord-Spierdijk	Koggenland, Opmeer	52°40′N 4°57′E	
Noordstroe	Hollands Kroon	52°56′N 4°58′E	
't Nopeind	Amsterdam	52°25′N 4°58′E	
Obdam	Koggenland	52°41′N 4°54′E	
Omval	Alkmaar	52°37′N 4°47′E	
Onderdijk	Medemblik	52°45′N 5°08′E	
Ongeren	Texel	53°04′N 4°48′E	
Oost	Texel	53°06′N 4°54′E	
Oostbeemster	Beemster	52°34′N 4°59′E	
Oostdorp	Bergen	52°40′N 4°42′E	
Oosteinde	Aalsmeer	52°17′N 4°48′E	
Oosterblokker	Drechterland	52°40′N 5°07′E	
Oosterbuurt	Castricum	52°33′N 4°41′E	
Oosterdijk	Enkhuizen	52°45′N 5°16′E	
Oosterend	Texel	53°05′N 4°53′E	
Oostergouw	Drechterland	52°41′N 5°14′E	
Oosterklief	Hollands Kroon	52°54′N 4°58′E	
Oosterland	Hollands Kroon	52°56′N 5°01′E	
Oosterleek	Drechterland	52°38′N 5°12′E	
Oosterwijzend	Drechterland	52°41′N 5°11′E	
Oosterzij	Heiloo	52°35′N 4°42′E	
Oost-Graftdijk	Alkmaar	52°33′N 4°49′E	
Oosthuizen	Edam-Volendam	52°34′N 5°00′E	
Oostknollendam	Wormerland	52°31′N 4°48′E	
Oostmijzen	Koggenland	52°36′N 4°56′E	
Oostwoud	Medemblik	52°44′N 5°05′E	
Oostzaan	Oostzaan	52°27′N 4°52′E	
Opmeer	Opmeer	52°42′N 4°57′E	
Opperdoes	Medemblik	52°46′N 5°05′E	
Osdorp	Amsterdam	52°22′N 4°47′E	
Oterleek	Alkmaar	52°38′N 4°50′E	
Oud-Diemen	Diemen	52°21′N 4°58′E	
Oude Meer	Haarlemmermeer	52°17′N 4°46′E	
Oudendijk	Koggenland	52°36′N 4°58′E	
Oude-Niedorp	Hollands Kroon	52°43′N 4°53′E	
Ouderkerk aan de Amstel	Ouder-Amstel, Amstelveen	52°18′N 4°54′E	
Oudeschild	Texel	53°02′N 4°52′E	
Oudesluis	Schagen	52°50′N 4°49′E	
Oudijk	Drechterland	52°41′N 5°07′E	
Oudkarspel	Langedijk	52°42′N 4°48′E	
Oudorp	Alkmaar	52°38′N 4°47′E	
Oud Valkeveen	Gooise Meren	52°18′N 5°12′E	
Over-Diemen	Diemen	52°20′N 5°00′E	
Overmeer	Wijdemeren	52°15′N 5°03′E	
Overveen	Bloemendaal	52°24′N 4°36′E	
Pannekeet	Langedijk	52°42′N 4°50′E	
Penningsveer	Haarlemmerliede en Spaarnwoude	52°23′N 4°41′E	
Petten	Schagen	52°46′N 4°40′E	
Poolland	Hollands Kroon	52°48′N 4°51′E	
Purmer	Purmerend, Edam-Volendam, Waterland	52°30′N 4°59′E	
Purmerbuurt	Purmerend	52°30′N 4°59′E	
Purmerend	Purmerend	52°31′N 4°57′E	
Purmerland	Waterland	52°29′N 4°56′E	
Ransdorp	Amsterdam	52°24′N 5°00′E	
Rijp	Schagen	52°45′N 4°45′E	
Rijsenhout	Haarlemmermeer	52°16′N 4°43′E	
Rinnegom	Bergen	52°37′N 4°39′E	
Rozenburg	Haarlemmermeer	52°17′N 4°44′E	
Rozewerf	Waterland	52°27′N 5°07′E	
Rustenburg	Koggenland	52°38′N 4°53′E	
Santpoort-Noord	Velsen	52°26′N 4°39′E	
Santpoort-Zuid	Bloemendaal, Velsen	52°25′N 4°38′E	
Schagen	Schagen	52°47′N 4°48′E	
Schagerbrug	Schagen	52°48′N 4°46′E	
Schalkwijk	Haarlem	52°22′N 4°40′E	Former village; now part of Haarlem
Schardam	Edam-Volendam	52°36′N 5°01′E	
Scharwoude	Koggenland	52°37′N 5°01′E	
Schellingwoude	Amsterdam	52°23′N 4°58′E	
Schellinkhout	Drechterland	52°38′N 5°07′E	
Schermerhorn	Alkmaar	52°36′N 4°53′E	
Schiphol	Haarlemmermeer	52°18′N 4°45′E	
Schoorl	Bergen	52°42′N 4°42′E	
Schoorldam	Bergen, Schagen	52°42′N 4°43′E	
Sijbekarspel	Medemblik	52°42′N 5°00′E	
Sint Janskerkhof	Laren	52°15′N 5°13′E	
Sint Maarten	Schagen	52°46′N 4°45′E	
Sint Maartensbrug	Schagen	52°47′N 4°44′E	
Sint Maartensvlotbrug	Schagen	52°47′N 4°43′E	
Sint Maartenszee	Schagen	52°47′N 4°42′E	
Sint Pancras	Langedijk	52°40′N 4°47′E	
Slootdorp	Hollands Kroon	52°51′N 4°58′E	
Sloten	Amsterdam	52°21′N 4°48′E	
Sloterdijk	Amsterdam	52°23′N 4°51′E	
Smerp	Hollands Kroon	52°56′N 4°59′E	
Spaarndam	Haarlem, Haarlemmerliede en Spaarnwoude	52°25′N 4°41′E	
Spaarnwoude	Haarlemmerliede en Spaarnwoude	52°24′N 4°42′E	
Spanbroek	Opmeer	52°42′N 4°57′E	
Spang	Texel	53°04′N 4°51′E	
Spierdijk	Koggenland	52°39′N 4°57′E	
Spijkdorp	Texel	53°05′N 4°51′E	
Spijkerboor	Wormerland	52°32′N 4°50′E	
Spoorbuurt	Hollands Kroon	52°52′N 4°49′E	
Starting	Castricum	52°33′N 4°44′E	
Stierop	Castricum	52°32′N 4°46′E	
Stolpen	Schagen	52°49′N 4°44′E	
Stolpervlotbrug	Schagen	52°49′N 4°44′E	
Stompetoren	Alkmaar	52°37′N 4°49′E	
Stroe	Hollands Kroon	52°56′N 4°59′E	
Stroet	Schagen	52°45′N 4°46′E	
Terdiek	Hollands Kroon	52°43′N 4°54′E	
Tersluis	Drechterland	52°40′N 5°14′E	
Tienhoven	Texel	53°04′N 4°48′E	
Tin	Hollands Kroon	52°47′N 4°50′E	
Tjallewal	Schagen	52°46′N 4°48′E	
Tolke	Schagen	52°46′N 4°48′E	
Tuindorp	Bloemendaal	52°23′N 4°36′E	
Tuindorp Oostzaan	Amsterdam	52°25′N 4°54′E	Neighbourhood of Amsterdam
Tuitjenhorn	Schagen	52°44′N 4°45′E	
Tweewegen	Hollands Kroon	52°50′N 4°54′E	
Twisk	Medemblik	52°45′N 5°04′E	
Uitdam	Waterland	52°25′N 5°04′E	
Uitermeer	Weesp	52°18′N 5°05′E	
Uitgeest	Uitgeest	52°32′N 4°43′E	
Uithoorn	Uithoorn	52°14′N 4°50′E	
Ursem	Koggenland	52°38′N 4°54′E	
Valkeveen	Huizen	52°19′N 5°11′E	
Valkkoog	Schagen	52°47′N 4°46′E	
Van Ewijcksluis	Hollands Kroon	52°53′N 4°53′E	
Vatrop	Hollands Kroon	52°56′N 5°00′E	
Veenhuizen	Heerhugowaard	52°42′N 4°54′E	
't Veld	Hollands Kroon	52°44′N 4°52′E	
Veldhuis	Medemblik	52°44′N 5°07′E	
Velsen-Noord	Velsen	52°28′N 4°39′E	
Velsen-Zuid	Velsen	52°28′N 4°38′E	
Venhuizen	Drechterland	52°40′N 5°13′E	
Verloren Einde	Edam-Volendam	52°32′N 4°58′E	
Vijfhuizen	Haarlemmermeer	52°21′N 4°41′E	
Vinkebrug	Haarlemmerliede en Spaarnwoude	52°23′N 4°43′E	
Vogelenzang	Bloemendaal	52°19′N 4°35′E	
Volendam	Edam-Volendam	52°30′N 5°04′E	
Vrouwenakker	Uithoorn, Nieuwkoop	52°14′N 4°47′E	Partially in South Holland.
Vrouwentroost	Aalsmeer	52°15′N 4°46′E	
Vrouwenverdriet	Zaanstad	52°28′N 4°46′E	
Waarland	Schagen	52°44′N 4°50′E	
't Wad	Schagen	52°48′N 4°50′E	
Wadway	Medemblik	52°42′N 4°59′E	
Warder	Edam-Volendam	52°34′N 5°01′E	
Warmenhuizen	Schagen	52°44′N 4°44′E	
Waterakkers	Heemskerk	52°30′N 4°39′E	
Watergang	Waterland	52°26′N 4°57′E	
Wateringskant	Hollands Kroon	52°46′N 4°52′E	
Waver	Ouder-Amstel	52°15′N 4°55′E	
Weberbuurt	Haarlemmermeer	52°19′N 4°40′E	
Weesp	Amsterdam	52°19′N 5°02′E	
Wervershoof	Medemblik	52°44′N 5°10′E	
Westbeemster	Beemster	52°34′N 4°54′E	
Westerblokker	Hoorn	52°40′N 5°06′E	
Westergeest	Texel	53°02′N 4°49′E	
Westerklief	Hollands Kroon	52°54′N 4°57′E	
Westerland	Hollands Kroon	52°53′N 4°56′E	
Westermient	Texel	53°04′N 4°46′E	
Westerwijzend	Drechterland	52°41′N 5°10′E	
Westerzij	Castricum	52°34′N 4°41′E	
West-Graftdijk	Alkmaar	52°33′N 4°48′E	
Westknollendam	Zaanstad	52°31′N 4°47′E	
Westmijzen	Koggenland	52°37′N 4°54′E	
Westwoud	Drechterland	52°41′N 5°08′E	
Westzaan	Zaanstad	52°28′N 4°46′E	
Westzaner-Overtoom	Zaanstad	52°26′N 4°47′E	
Weteringbrug	Haarlemmermeer	52°13′N 4°39′E	
Wieringerwaard	Hollands Kroon	52°50′N 4°52′E	
Wieringerwerf	Hollands Kroon	52°51′N 5°02′E	
Wieringerwerf-Zuid	Hollands Kroon	52°50′N 5°01′E	
Wijdenes	Drechterland	52°38′N 5°09′E	
Wijdewormer	Wormerland	52°30′N 4°57′E	Municipality, not a settlement.
Wijk aan Zee	Beverwijk	52°30′N 4°36′E	
Wijmers	Drechterland	52°39′N 5°09′E	
Wijzend	Medemblik	52°42′N 5°03′E	
Wimmenum	Bergen	52°38′N 4°39′E	
Winkel	Hollands Kroon	52°45′N 4°55′E	
Wittewerf	Waterland	52°27′N 5°06′E	
Wogmeer	Koggenland	52°39′N 4°55′E	
Wognum	Medemblik	52°41′N 5°02′E	
Wormer	Wormerland	52°30′N 4°49′E	
Wormerveer	Zaanstad	52°29′N 4°47′E	
Zaandam	Zaanstad	52°27′N 4°50′E	
Zaandijk	Zaanstad	52°29′N 4°48′E	
Zaanstad	Zaanstad	52°27′N 4°50′E	Municipality; not a settlement.
't Zand	Schagen	52°50′N 4°45′E	
Zandburen	Hollands Kroon	52°55′N 4°58′E	
Zandvoort	Zandvoort	52°22′N 4°32′E	
Zandwerven	Opmeer	52°41′N 4°57′E	
Zanegeest	Bergen	52°41′N 4°43′E	
Zedde	Waterland	52°29′N 5°02′E	
Zevenhuizen	Texel	53°05′N 4°53′E	
Zijdewind	Hollands Kroon	52°44′N 4°51′E	
Zijpersluis	Schagen	52°44′N 4°41′E	
Zittend	Drechterland	52°41′N 5°08′E	
Zuid-Eierland	Texel	53°07′N 4°49′E	
Zuideinde	Langedijk	52°39′N 4°47′E	
Zuidermeer	Koggenland, Opmeer	52°40′N 4°59′E	
Zuiderwoude	Waterland	52°26′N 5°02′E	
Zuidhaffel	Texel	53°02′N 4°48′E	
Zuidoostbeemster	Beemster	52°31′N 4°57′E	
Zuidschalkwijk	Haarlem	52°21′N 4°38′E	
Zuid-Scharwoude	Langedijk	52°41′N 4°49′E	
Zuidschermer	Castricum	52°35′N 4°47′E	
Zuid-Spierdijk	Koggenland	52°38′N 4°56′E	
Zunderdorp	Amsterdam	52°24′N 4°58′E	
Zwaag	Hoorn	52°40′N 5°04′E	
Zwaagdijk-Oost	Medemblik	52°42′N 5°08′E	
Zwaagdijk-West	Medemblik	52°41′N 5°03′E	
Zwaanshoek	Haarlemmermeer	52°19′N 4°37′E	
Zwanenburg	Haarlemmermeer	52°23′N 4°45′E	

== Sources ==
- GEOnet Names Server (GNS)
