= Bangert =

Bangert may refer to:

- Bangert (surname)
- The original name for Drechterland, an area of the Netherlands
- Bangert, Missouri
- Bangert, North Holland
