= Keet =

Keet may refer to:

- Keet, a name for some types of parakeet
- Keet, a young guineafowl
- KEET, a television station in California
- Keet, an orca
- Blauwe Keet, a Dutch hamlet
- Keet, an instant messaging software

== People ==
- BB Keet, Afrikaner theologian
- Darren Keet, South African association football player
- Jim Keet, American politician
