= Axwijk =

Axwijk is a surname. Notable people with the surname include:

- Lion Axwijk (born 1984), Dutch footballer, brother of Iwan
- Iwan Axwijk (born 1983), Dutch footballer
