= Noorddijk =

Noorddijk may refer to:

- Noorddijk, North Holland, Netherlands
- Noorddijk, Groningen, Netherlands

== See also ==
- Noordijk (disambiguation)
