= Noordermeer =

- Hamlet
- Location in the Netherlands Location in the province of North Holland in the Netherlands
- Coordinates: 52°40′28″N 4°58′39″E
- Country: Netherlands
- Province: North Holland
- Municipality: Koggenland
- Time zone: UTC+1 (CET)
  - Summer (DST): UTC+2 (CEST)
- Postal code: 1652
- Dialing code: 0229

Noordermeer is a hamlet in the Dutch province of North Holland. It is a part of the municipality of Koggenland, and lies about 5 km east of Heerhugowaard.

The hamlet was first mentioned in 1575 as Noore meer, and means "northern lake" which refers to the Baarsdorpermeer. Noorder ("northern") has been added to distinguish from Zuidermeer.

Noordermeer is not a statistical entity, and the postal authorities have placed it under Zuidermeer. It consists of about 25 houses.
