= Huigsloot =

Coordinates: 52°12′58″N 4°35′49″E

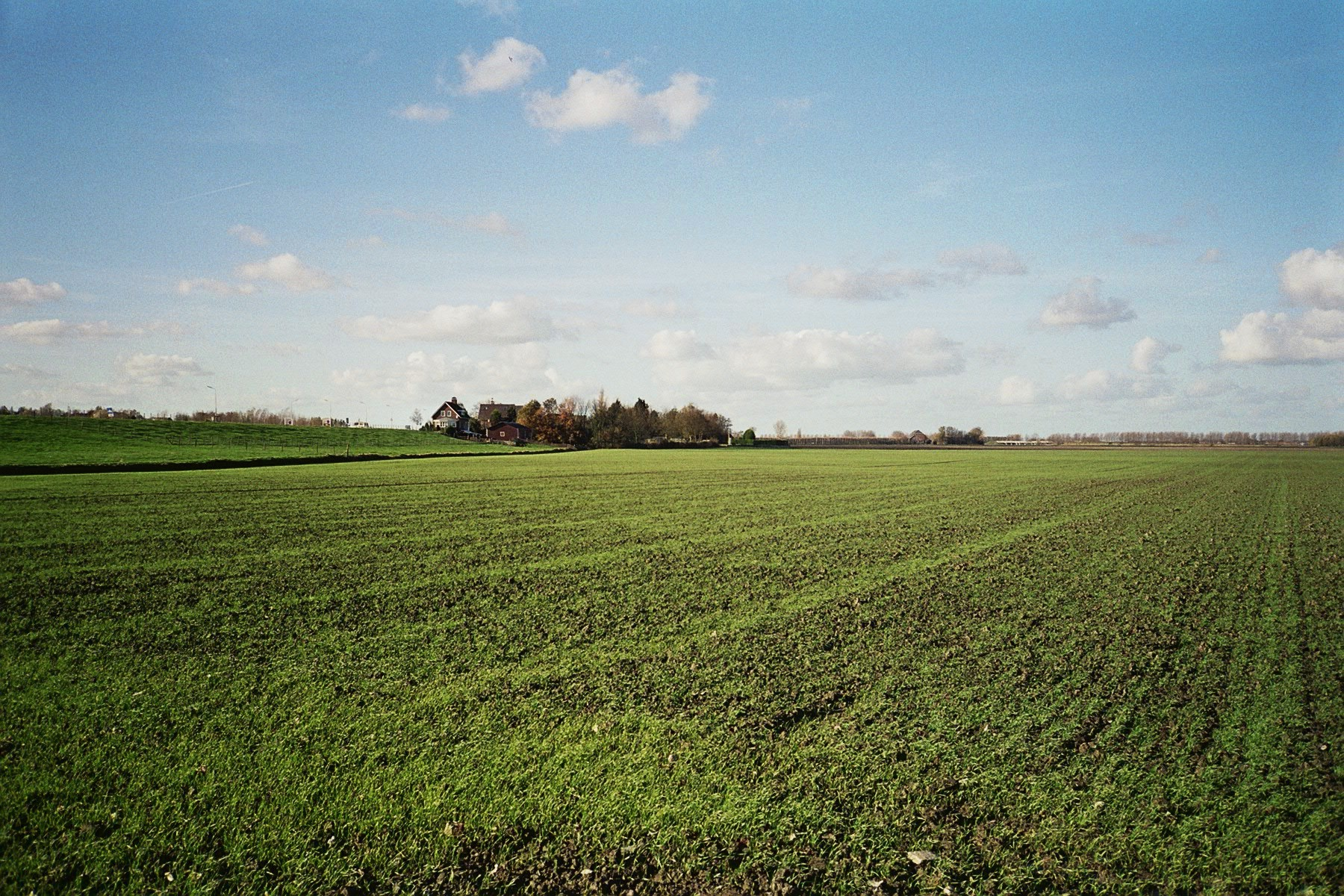
- Countryside near Huigsloot.
- Interactive map of Huigsloot
- Municipality: Haarlemmermeer
- Province: North Holland

Huigsloot (Dutch pronunciation: [ˈɦœyxsloːt]) is a hamlet in the Dutch municipality of Haarlemmermeer, in the province of North Holland. It is located on the southeast of a polder, on Ringvaart, between Buitenkaag and Vredeburg. It is considered part of Abbenes residential area.

Before the creation of the polder of Haarlemmermeer, Huigsloot formed an isthmus in the lake. This isthmus was cut off from the nearby land around 1840 by the construction of a canal in Ringvaart, which also formed a parcel of former land into a polder. The road from Huigsloot to Abbenes runs close to the centre of the former isthmus.
