= Bangert (surname) =

Bangert is a surname. Notable people with the surname include:

- Emilius Bangert (1883–1962), Danish composer, classical organist, and educator
- Gretchen Bangert (born 1966), American politician
- Jann Bangert (born 1997), German footballer
- Ursel Bangert, German physicist
- Victor Bangert (born 1950), German mathematician
