= Noordijk =

Noordijk may refer to:

- Noordijk, Gelderland, a place in the Dutch province of Gelderland
- Noordijk, Overijssel, a place in the Dutch province of Overijssel

== See also ==
- Noorddijk (disambiguation)
