= Overmeer =

- Neighbourhood and former village
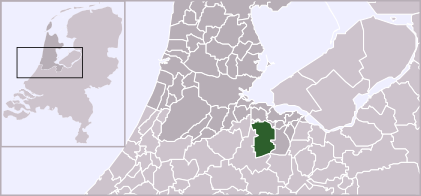

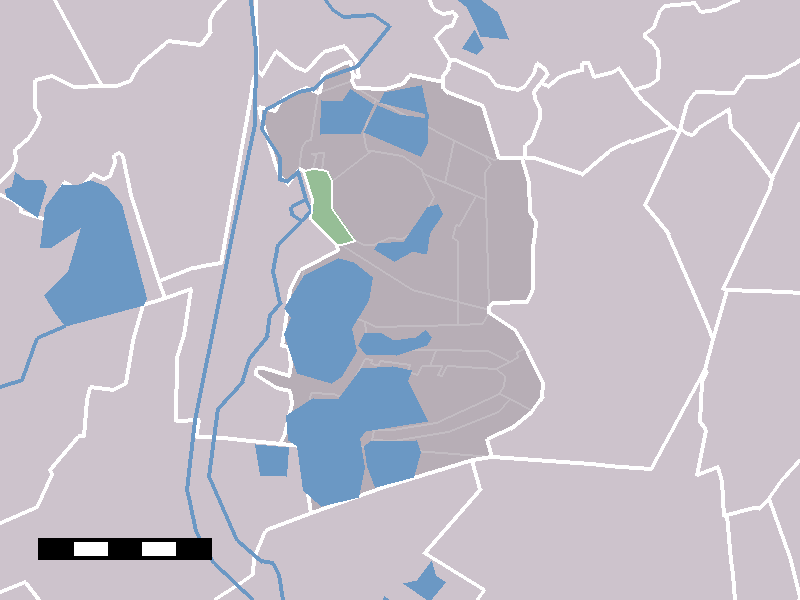
- Overmeer in the municipality of Wijdemeren.
- Coordinates: 52°15′15″N 5°05′02″E
- Country: Netherlands
- Province: North Holland
- Municipality: Wijdemeren
- Village: Nederhorst den Berg
- Time zone: UTC+1 (CET)
  - Summer (DST): UTC+2 (CEST)

Overmeer is a neighbourhood of Nederhorst den Berg and former village in the Dutch province of North Holland. It is a part of the municipality of Wijdemeren, and lies about 8 km northwest of Hilversum. Overmeer used to be a separate village, but has now grown together with the town of Nederhorst den Berg.
