= Lion Axwijk =

Dutch footballer

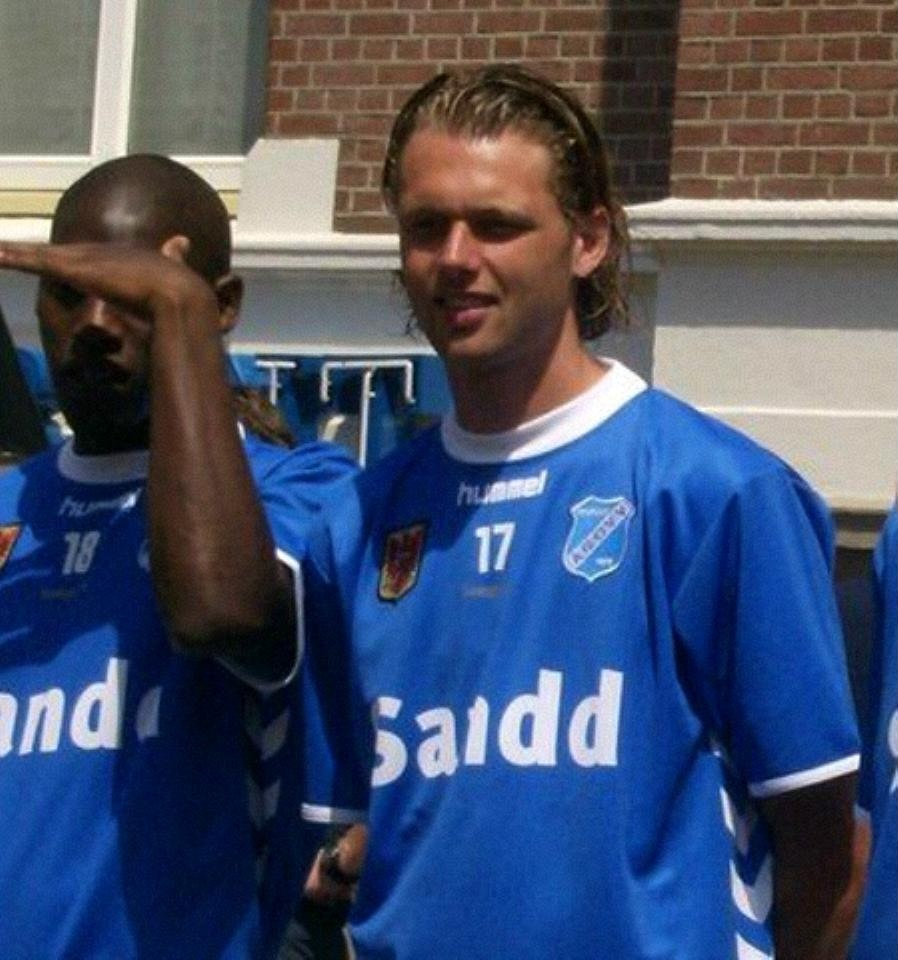
- Axwijk (left) with Ferry de Smalen at AGOVV in the 2007/08 season

Personal information
- Full name: Leyond Marvin Axwijk
- Date of birth: 18 March 1984 (age 42)
- Place of birth: Amsterdam, Netherlands
- Position: Leftback

Team information
- Current team: Hellas Sport

Senior career*
| Years | Team | Apps | (Gls) |
| 2005 | RKC | 4 | (0) |
| 2006 | → Veendam (loan) | 8 | (0) |
| 2006–2008 | AGOVV | 30 | (0) |
| 2008–2010 | IJsselmeervogels | 40 | (3) |
| 2010–2011 | Spakenburg | | |
| 2011–2013 | De Dijk | | |
| 2013–2014 | OFC | | |
- * Club domestic league appearances and goals as of 28 July 2016

Lion Axwijk (born 18 March 1984 in Amsterdam, Netherlands) is a Dutch retired footballer.

== Club career ==
He played for Eredivisie league club RKC Waalwijk during the 2005–2006 season but was loaned to Eerste Divisie club SC Veendam in January 2006. He joined AGOVV Apeldoorn on a free transfer in summer 2006 and signed for two years.

He later played for amateur sides IJsselmeervogels, SV Spakenburg, ASV De Dijk and OFC before joining Hellas Sport.

He also played for the Dutch police team.

== Personal life ==
His brother Iwan Axwijk played professionally for Eerste Divisie club Haarlem.
