= Boekel, North Holland =

Boekel
- Hamlet
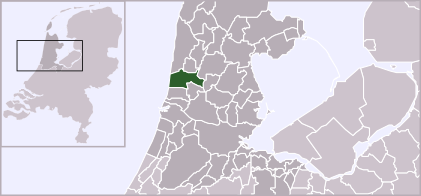

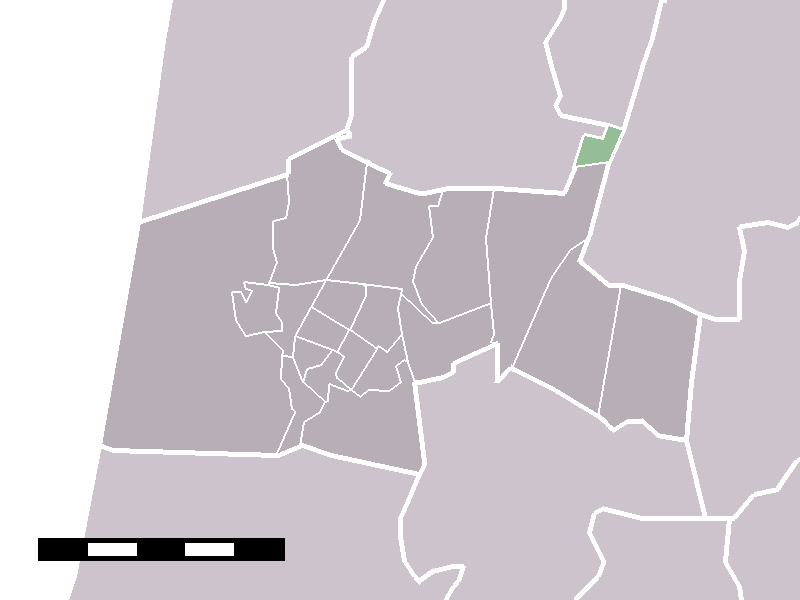
- The statistical district (lightgreen) of Boekel in the municipality of Castricum.
- Coordinates: 52°35′24″N 4°45′12″E
- Country: Netherlands
- Province: North Holland
- Municipality: Castricum
- Time zone: UTC+1 (CET)
  - Summer (DST): UTC+2 (CEST)

Boekel is a hamlet in the Dutch province of North Holland. It is a part of the municipality of Castricum, and lies about 5 km south of Alkmaar. Until January 1, 2002, Boekel belonged to the municipality of Akersloot. It had a population of about 10 in 2001.

Boekel is located on the west bank of the Noordhollandsch Kanaal. According to the 19th-century historian A.J. van der Aa, a castle was located here, also called "Boekel". It was destroyed by the Spanish army during the siege of Alkmaar, on October 3, 1574.
