= Barsingerhorn =

- Village
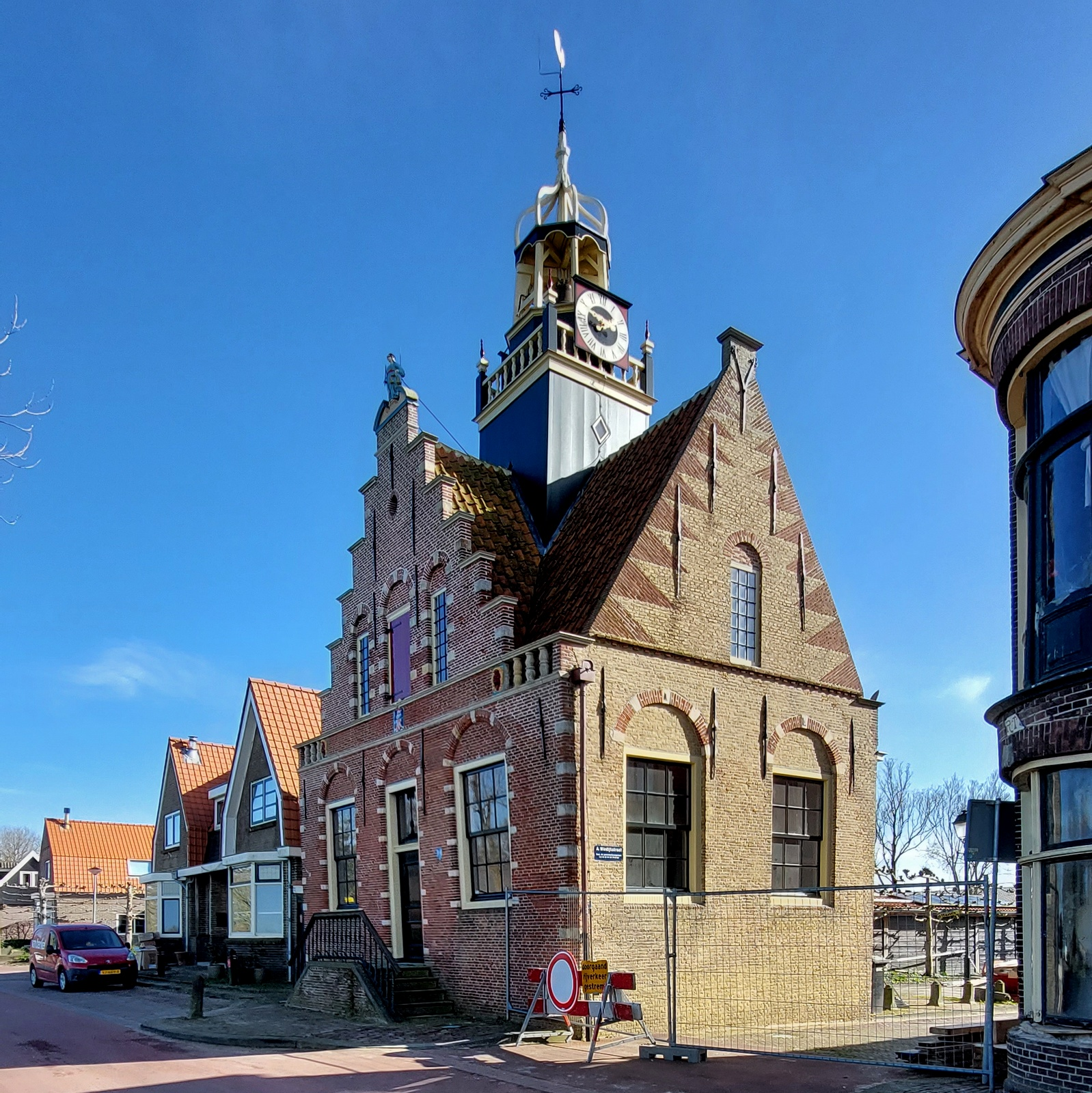

- Coat of arms

- Location in the Netherlands Location in the province of North Holland in the Netherlands
- Coordinates: 52°47′7″N 4°50′30″E
- Country: Netherlands
- Province: North Holland
- Municipality: Hollands Kroon

Area
  - Village: 9.23 km^{2} (3.56 sq mi)
- Elevation: 0.5 m (1.6 ft)

Population (2025)
  - Village: 905
  - Density: 98.0/km^{2} (254/sq mi)
  - Urban: 665
  - Rural: 240
- Time zone: UTC+1 (CET)
  - Summer (DST): UTC+2 (CEST)
- Postal code: 1768
- Dialing code: 0224

Barsingerhorn (West Frisian: Barregórre) is a village in the Dutch province of North Holland. It is a part of the municipality of Hollands Kroon, and lies about 13 kilometres (8.1 mi) north of Heerhugowaard. It received city rights in 1415.

== History ==
The settlement was first mentioned in 1289 as Bersincshorne, and means "corner (in the dike) of the people of Barse (person)". Barsingerhorn developed in the 12th century on the sea dike. Together with Haringhuizen, it received city rights in 1415.

The former town hall was built in 1622. It has a landing stairs with wooden bell tower and balustrade. There is a little jail in the cellar. A Dutch Reformed church was built in 1574, but has been demolished in 1968, because it was in a bad shape. Barsingerhorn has a modest Mennonite church from 1862. It was decommissioned in 1972 and has become private property.

Barsingerhorn was home to 926 people in 1840. It was an independent municipality until 1990 when it was merged into Niedorp. In 2012, it became part of the municipality of Hollands Kroon.

== Gallery ==
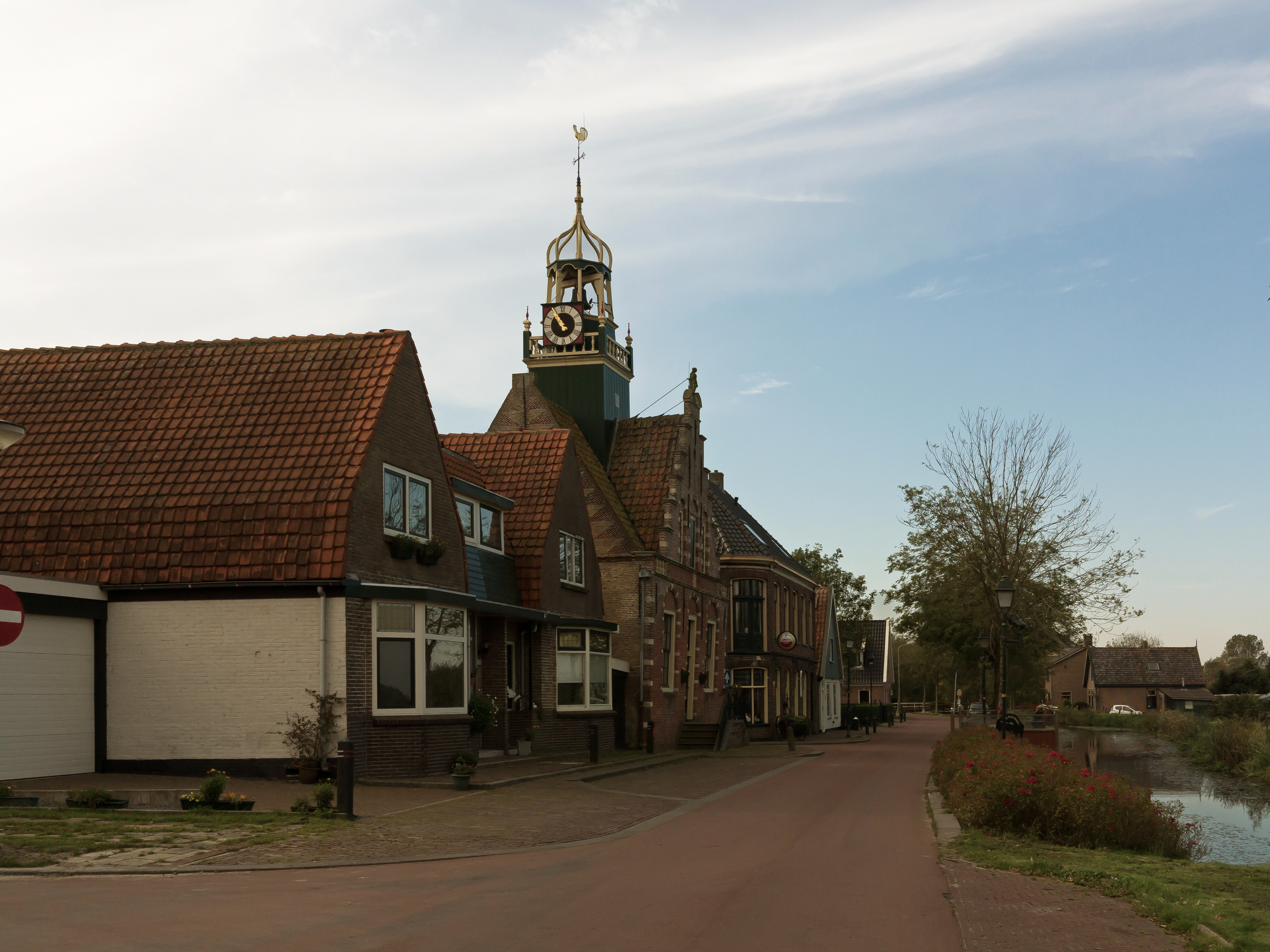
Former town hall in the street

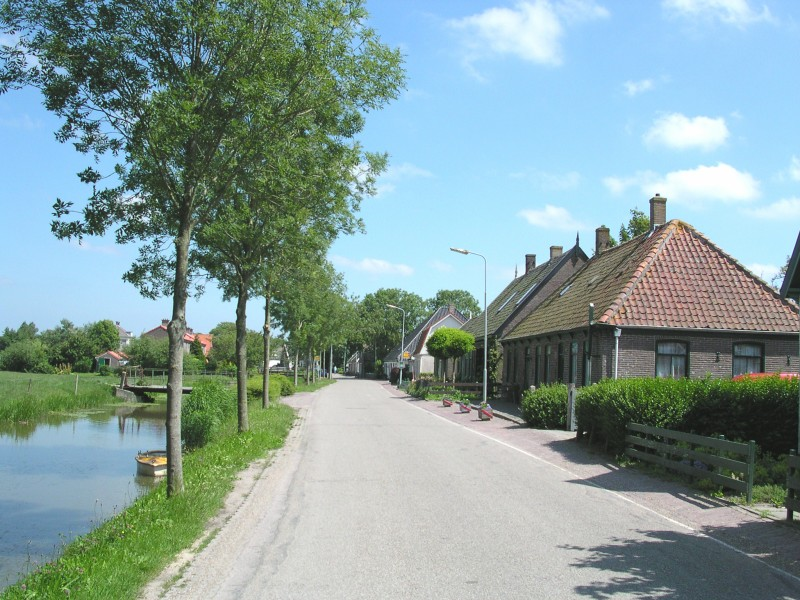
Street view

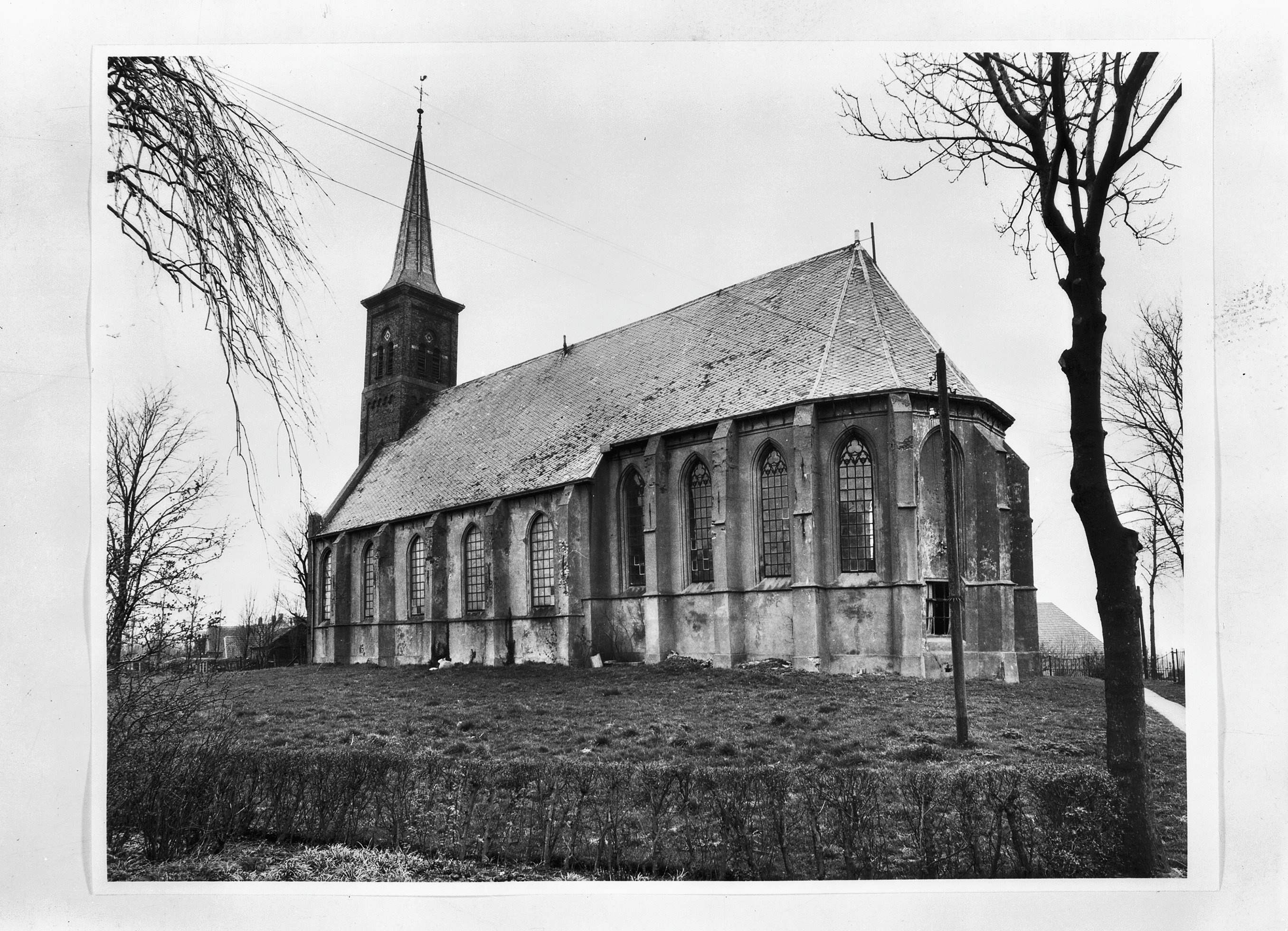
Dutch Reformed church (1957)

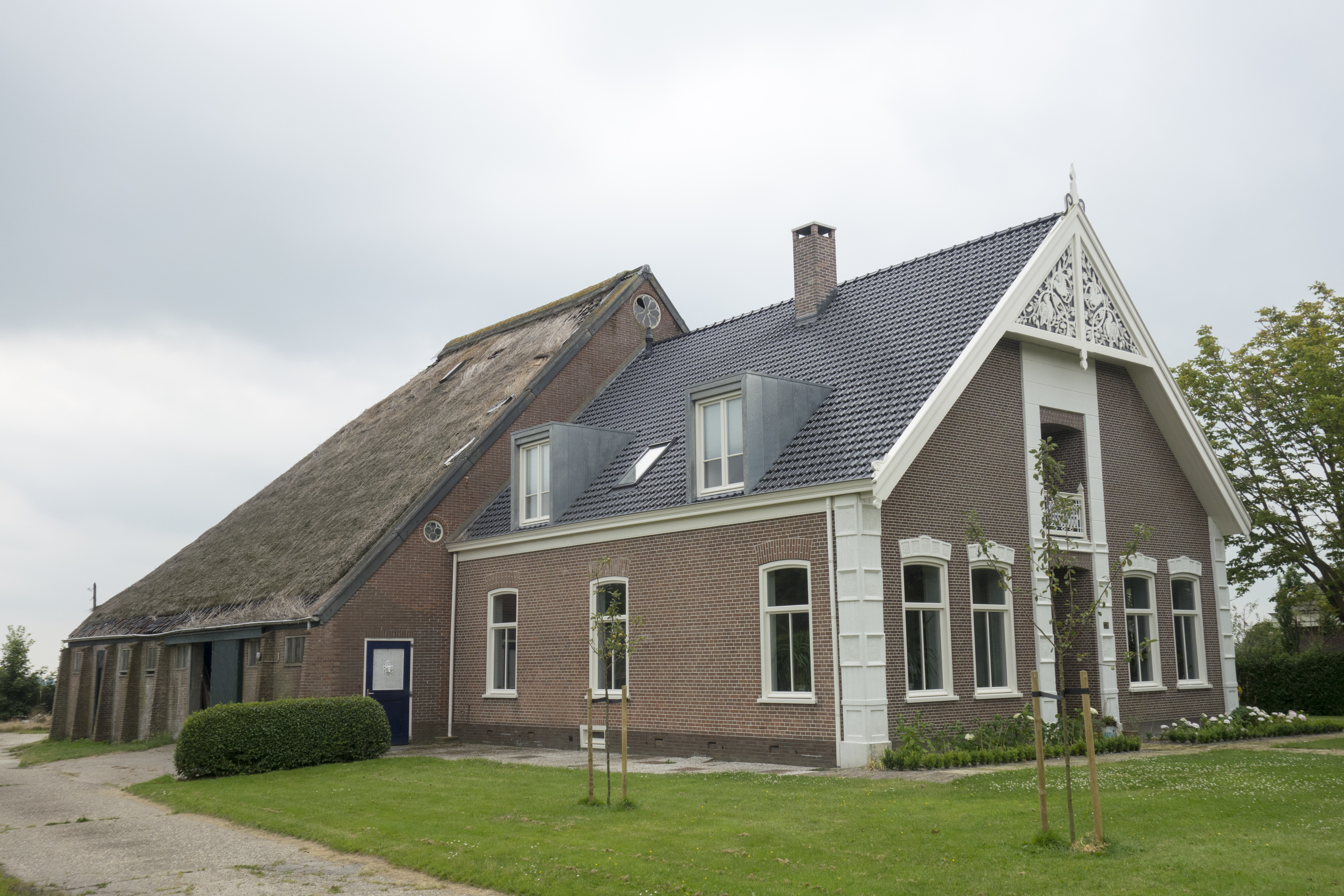
Farm in Barsingerhorn
