= Horstermeer =

- Hamlet
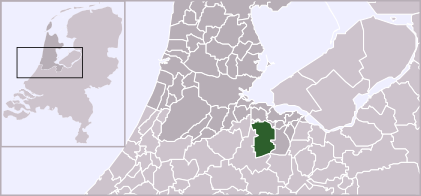

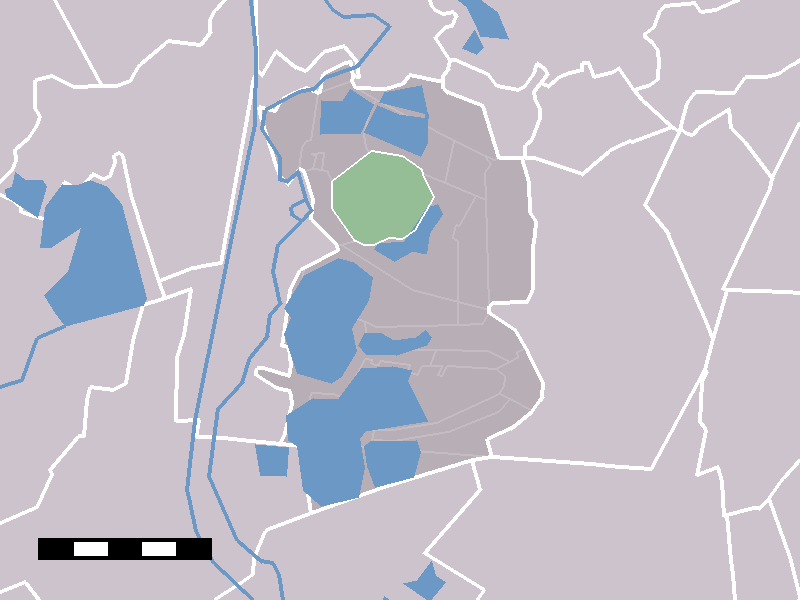
- The statistical district of Horstermeer in the municipality of Wijdemeren.
- Coordinates: 52°14′59″N 5°04′27″E
- Country: Netherlands
- Province: North Holland
- Municipality: Wijdemeren

Population (2007)
  - Total: 770
- Time zone: UTC+1 (CET)
  - Summer (DST): UTC+2 (CEST)

Horstermeer is a town in the Dutch province of North Holland. It is a part of the municipality of Wijdemeren, and lies about 8 km northwest of Hilversum.

The statistical district "Horstermeer", which covers the village and the surrounding Horstermeerpolder, has a population of around 770.

== Dutch mainland separation ==
As of 18 February 2010, the village separated from the Dutch government as the republic "Horstermeerpolder", in a protest against flooding their area. As district politics did not listen to their protest, they separated from the main country. A serious act Dutch police are not allowed on their grounds, and they use military vehicles as protection. Although often joked everywhere in the Netherlands to separated from main Dutch politics, this is a first time it actually happened. (translated newslink)
