= Blokdijk =

- Hamlet
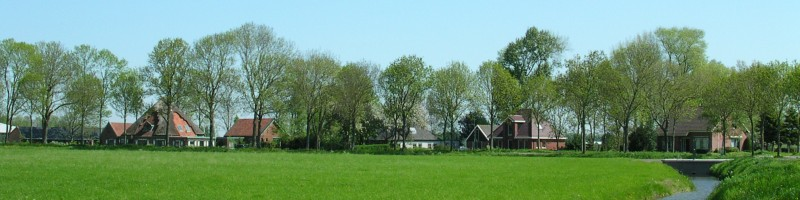

- Location in the Netherlands Location in the province of North Holland in the Netherlands
- Coordinates: 52°39′18″N 5°10′1″E
- Country: Netherlands
- Province: North Holland
- Municipality: Drechterland

Area
  - Total: 1.38 km^{2} (0.53 sq mi)
- Elevation: −1.0 m (−3.3 ft)

Population (2021)
  - Total: 25
  - Density: 18/km^{2} (47/sq mi)
- Time zone: UTC+1 (CET)
  - Summer (DST): UTC+2 (CEST)
- Postal code: 1606
- Dialing code: 0228

Blokdijk is a hamlet in the municipality of Drechterland, in the Dutch province of North Holland. Until 2006, Blokdijk was part of the municipality Venhuizen.

Both Blokdijk and De Hout are formally a part of Wijdenes. Blokdijk arose at the dyke from Hoorn to Venhuizen. It was first mentioned in 1402 as Block-dyck, and means "enclosed pasture near a dike". Blokdijk does not have place name signs.

== Gallery ==
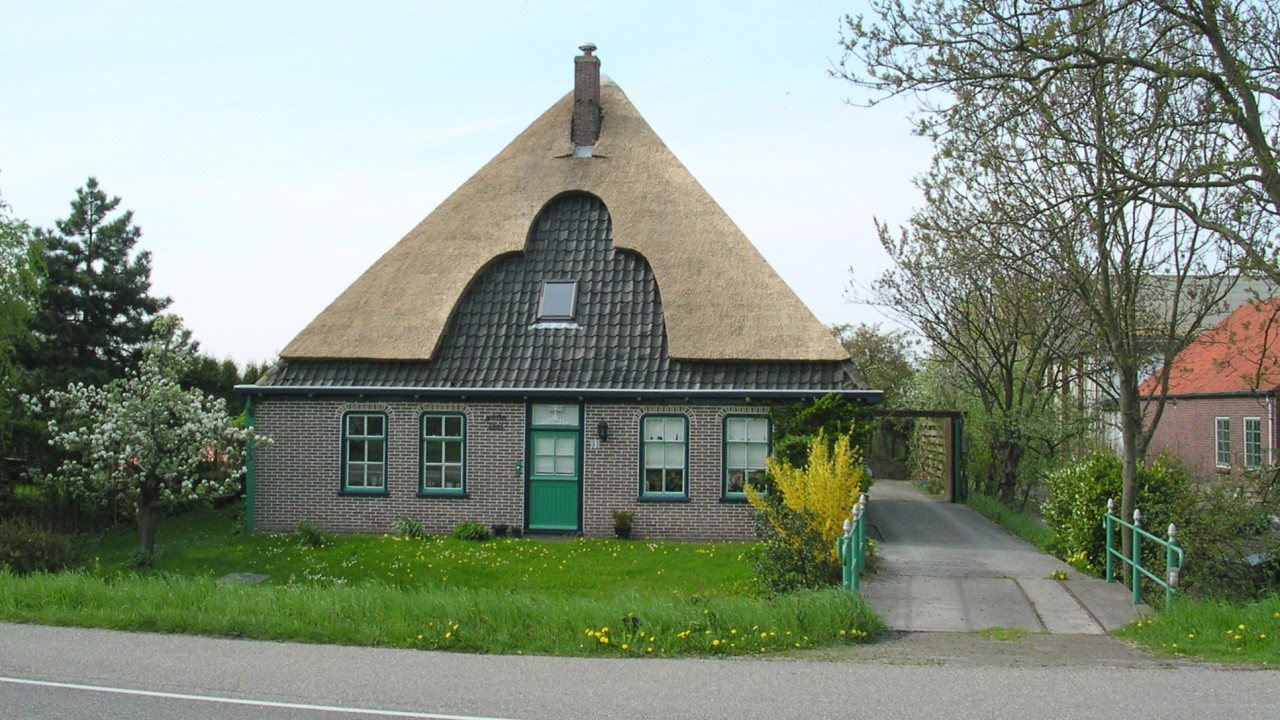
Farmhouse
