= Hinderdam =

- Hamlet
- Location in the Netherlands Location in the province of North Holland in the Netherlands
- Coordinates: 52°16′58″N 5°03′25″E
- Country: Netherlands
- Province: North Holland
- Municipality: Wijdemeren
- Time zone: UTC+1 (CET)
  - Summer (DST): UTC+2 (CEST)

Hinderdam is a hamlet in the Dutch province of North Holland. It is a part of the municipality of Wijdemeren, and lies about 15 km southeast of Amsterdam.

Hinderdam consists of about 20 houses.
