= Hakkelaarsbrug =

- Hamlet
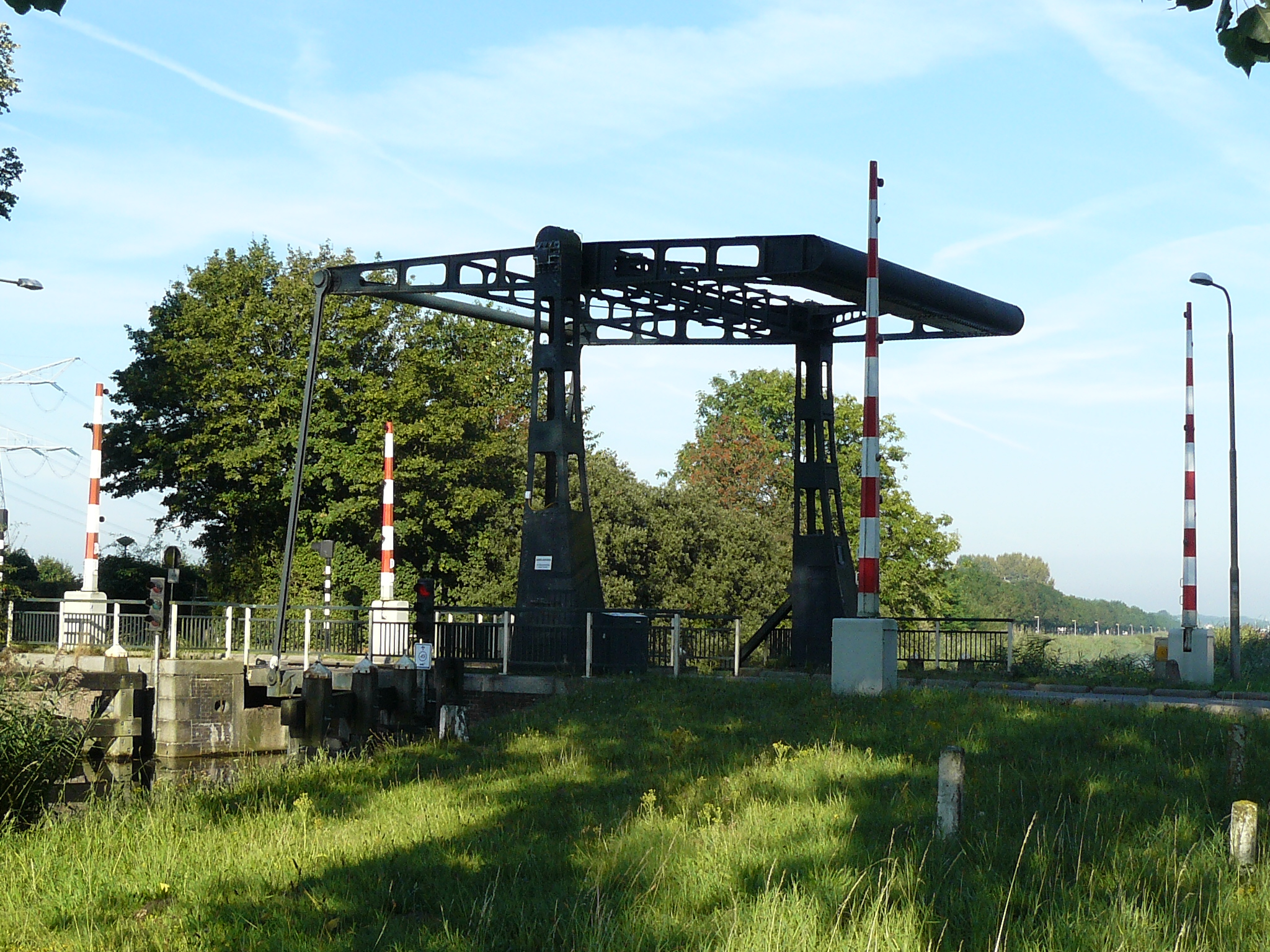
- The bridge after which the hamlet is named

- Location in the Netherlands Location in the province of North Holland in the Netherlands
- Coordinates: 52°19′N 5°6′E
- Country: Netherlands
- Province: North Holland
- Municipality: Gooise Meren
- Time zone: UTC+1 (CET)
  - Summer (DST): UTC+2 (CEST)
- Postal code: 1399
- Dialing code: 0294

Hakkelaarsbrug is a hamlet in the Dutch province of North Holland. It is a part of the municipality of Gooise Meren, and lies about 6 km northwest of Bussum.

Hakkelaarsbrug is not a statistical entity, and the postal authorities have placed it under Muiderberg. It has no place name signs and consists of about 40 houses.

It was first mentioned in 1617 as Hackelaers brug, and is named after the former toll bridge. The etymology of the name is unclear. The location was notable earlier, because Floris V, Count of Holland was killed at Hakkelaarsbrug in 1296 by angry peasants.
