= Zuid Haffel =

- Hamlet
- Location in the Netherlands Location in the province of North Holland in the Netherlands
- Coordinates: 53°2′15″N 4°48′35″E
- Country: Netherlands
- Province: North Holland
- Municipality: Texel
- Elevation: 1.9 m (6.2 ft)
- Time zone: UTC+1 (CET)
  - Summer (DST): UTC+2 (CEST)
- Postal code: 1791
- Dialing code: 0222

Zuid Haffel (South Haffel) is a polder and hamlet in the northwest of the Netherlands. It is located on the island of Texel, North Holland. Texel is also the municipality of the place.

Zuid Haffel is one of the oldest polders on the island of Texel. Around the end of the 13th century, the area was surrounded by dykes. In 1350, Jan van Henegouwen gave his permission to create a dyke between Tjarkshorn and the Lyorts road. These names are of Frisian origin. The areas to be drained were already part of the polder Zuid Haffel. Around 1500, the municipality was named Zuidhaffelt.

The road running through the municipality was named Burenweg (neighbor's road) and later Zuidhaffelderweg. Nearby is a farm named Zuidhaffel, which lies on de Waterweg, built in the 16th century. This state monument was intended to be turned into a museum, but this plan was dropped. Instead, in 1969, the farm was restored.

The hamlet has no place name signs, and is considered part of Den Burg. In 1840, it was home to 69 people. Nowadays, it consists of about 20 houses.
