= Zuidermeer =

- Village
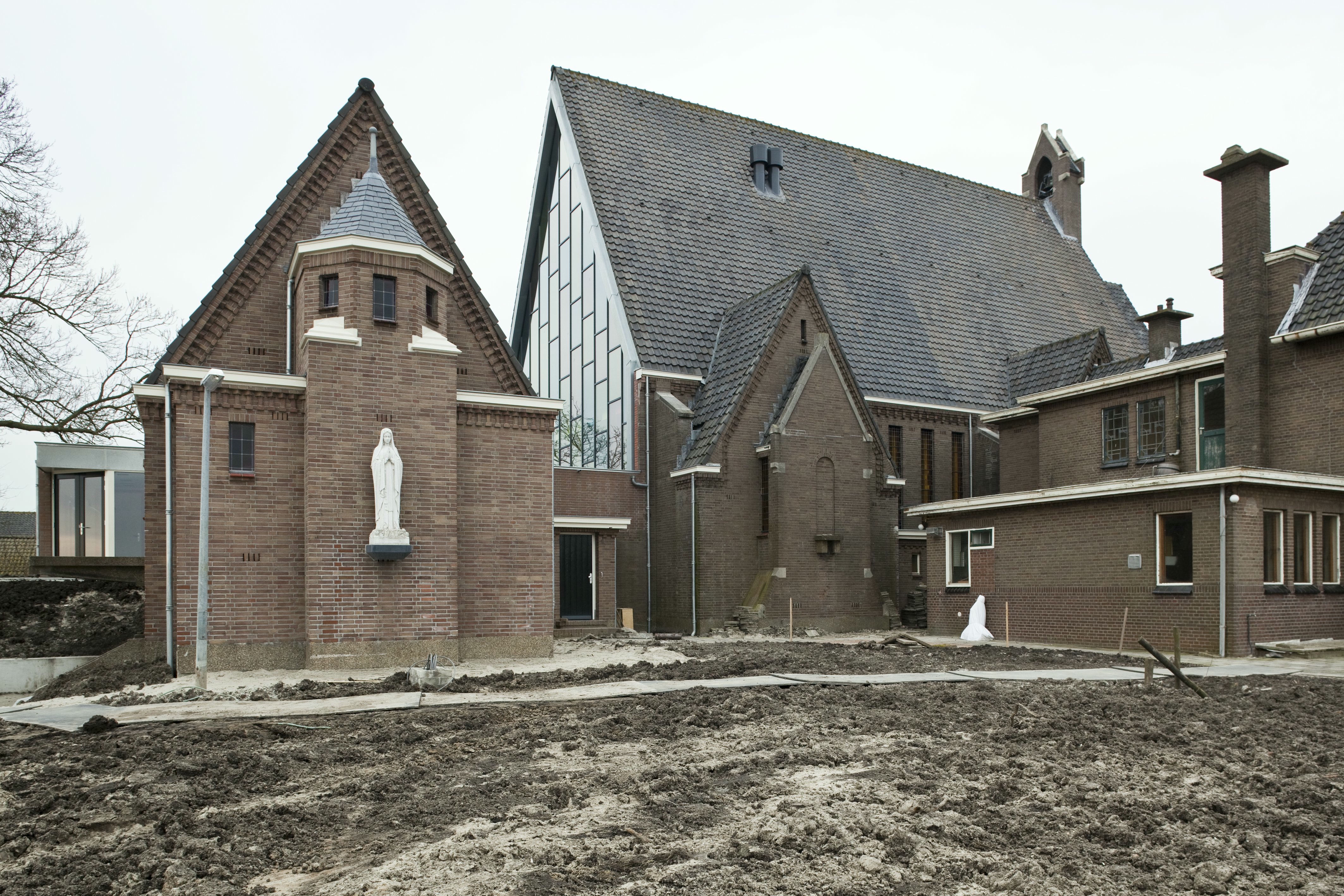
- Our Lady of Lourdes Church

- Location in the Netherlands Location in the province of North Holland in the Netherlands
- Coordinates: 52°40′N 4°59′E
- Country: Netherlands
- Province: North Holland
- Municipality: Koggenland

Area
  - Total: 6.59 km^{2} (2.54 sq mi)
- Elevation: −2.1 m (−6.9 ft)

Population (2025)
  - Total: 420
  - Density: 64/km^{2} (170/sq mi)
- Time zone: UTC+1 (CET)
  - Summer (DST): UTC+2 (CEST)
- Postal code: 1652
- Dialing code: 0229

Zuidermeer is a village in the Dutch province of North Holland. It is a part of the municipality of Koggenland and lies about 6 km west of Hoorn.

The village was first mentioned in 1665 as Zuyder M., and means "southern lake". It refers to the Baarsdorpermeer which was poldered in 1624. Zuid- ("south") has been added to distinguish from Noordermeer. Zuidermeer was home to 87 people in 1840.

In 1898, a railway station opened on the Alkmaar to Hoorn railway line. It closed in 1938. In 1934, the Catholic Our Lady of Lourdes Church was built with the expectation that the village would grow in the future. The village house moved into the church after the local pub closed down, and it was decided in 2007 to transform the church in a multifunctional centre.

== Gallery ==
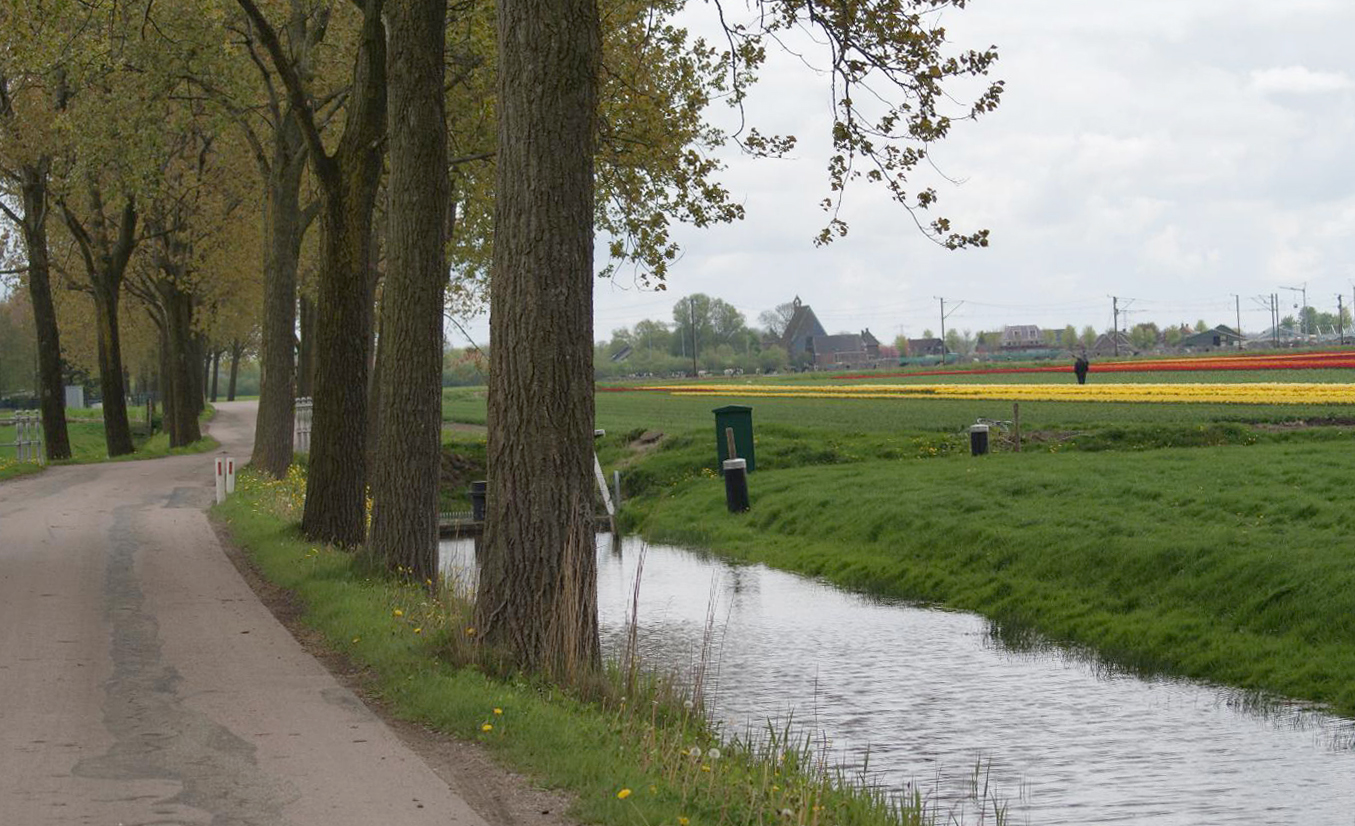
A street in Zuidermeer

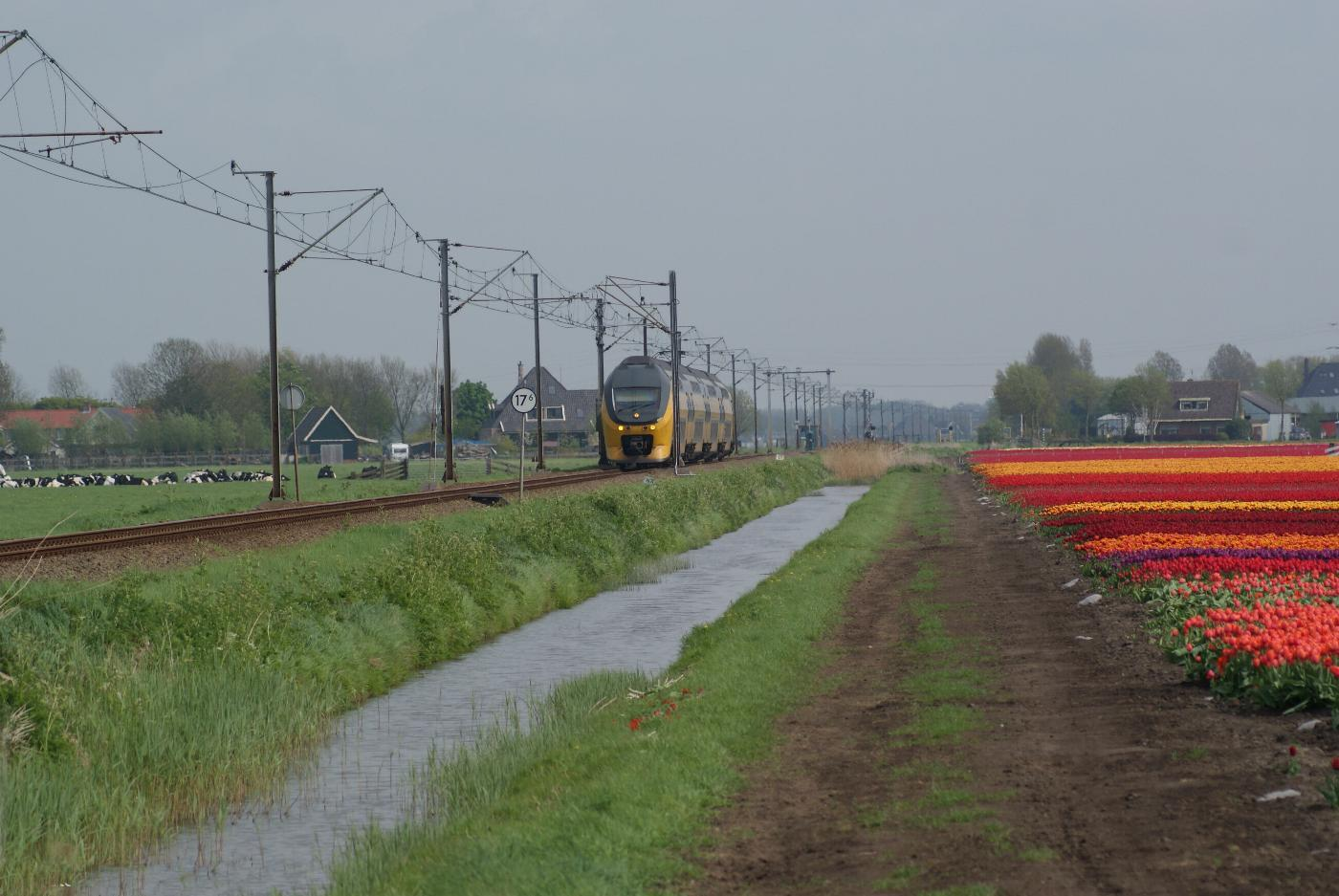
Rural landscape of Zuidermeer
