= Stierop =

- Hamlet
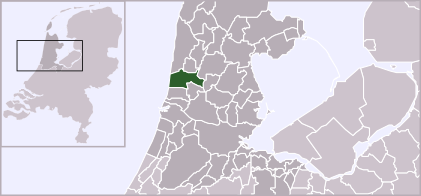

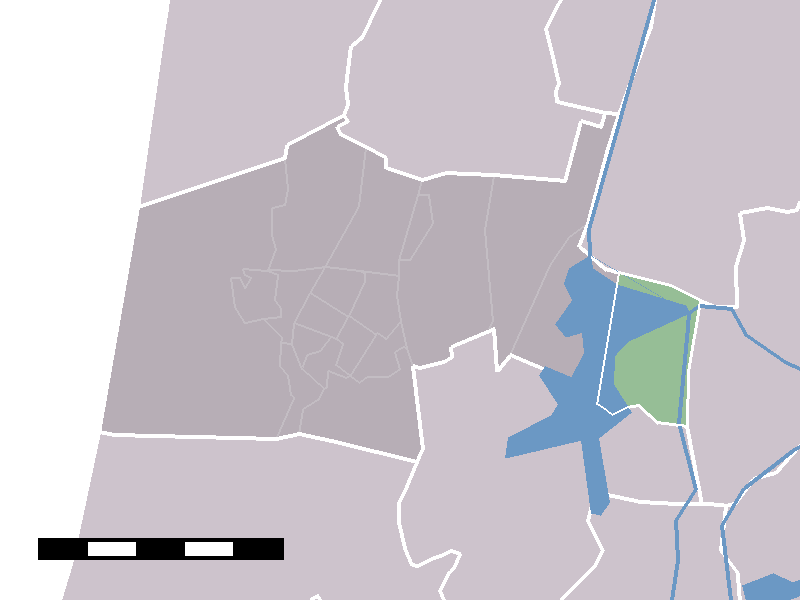
- The statistical district (lightgreen) of De Woude in the municipality of Castricum. Stierop lies at the south boundary of this district.

- Location in the Netherlands
- Coordinates: 52°32′07″N 4°46′12″E
- Country: Netherlands
- Province: North Holland
- Municipality: Castricum
- Time zone: UTC+1 (CET)
  - Summer (DST): UTC+2 (CEST)

Stierop is a hamlet in the Dutch province of North Holland. It is a part of the municipality of Castricum, and lies about 9 km south of Alkmaar. Until 1 January 2002, Stierop belonged to the municipality of Akersloot.

Stierop has about 20 inhabitants.
