= Iwan Axwijk =

Dutch footballer (born 1983)

Personal information
- Full name: Iwan Purcy Axwijk
- Date of birth: 3 May 1983 (age 43)
- Place of birth: Amsterdam, Netherlands
- Position: Midfielder

Youth career
- Hellas Sport
- –2004: FC Utrecht

Senior career*
Years	Team	Apps	(Gls)
2004–2008	Haarlem	99	(1)
2008–2009	Lisse		
2009–2010	IJsselmeervogels		
2010–2011	Sparta Nijkerk		

International career
2001	Netherlands U-19	1	(0)
- * Club domestic league appearances and goals as of 28 July 2016

Iwan Axwijk (born 3 May 1983 in Amsterdam, Netherlands) is a Dutch footballer who played for Eerste Divisie club HFC Haarlem during the 2004–2008 seasons.

== Club career ==
Axwijk left the FC Utrecht youth setup in 2004 to play 4 years professionally for Haarlem in the Eerste Divisie. In summer 2008 he joined amateur side FC Lisse and later played for IJsselmeervogels and Sparta Nijkerk before returning to childhood club Hellas Sport.

== International career ==
Axwijk played once for the Netherlands national under-19 football team, in 2001 against Italy.

== Personal life ==
His brother Lion Axwijk played professional football for RKC Waalwijk, SC Veendam and AGOVV.
