= Haaldersbroek =

- Hamlet
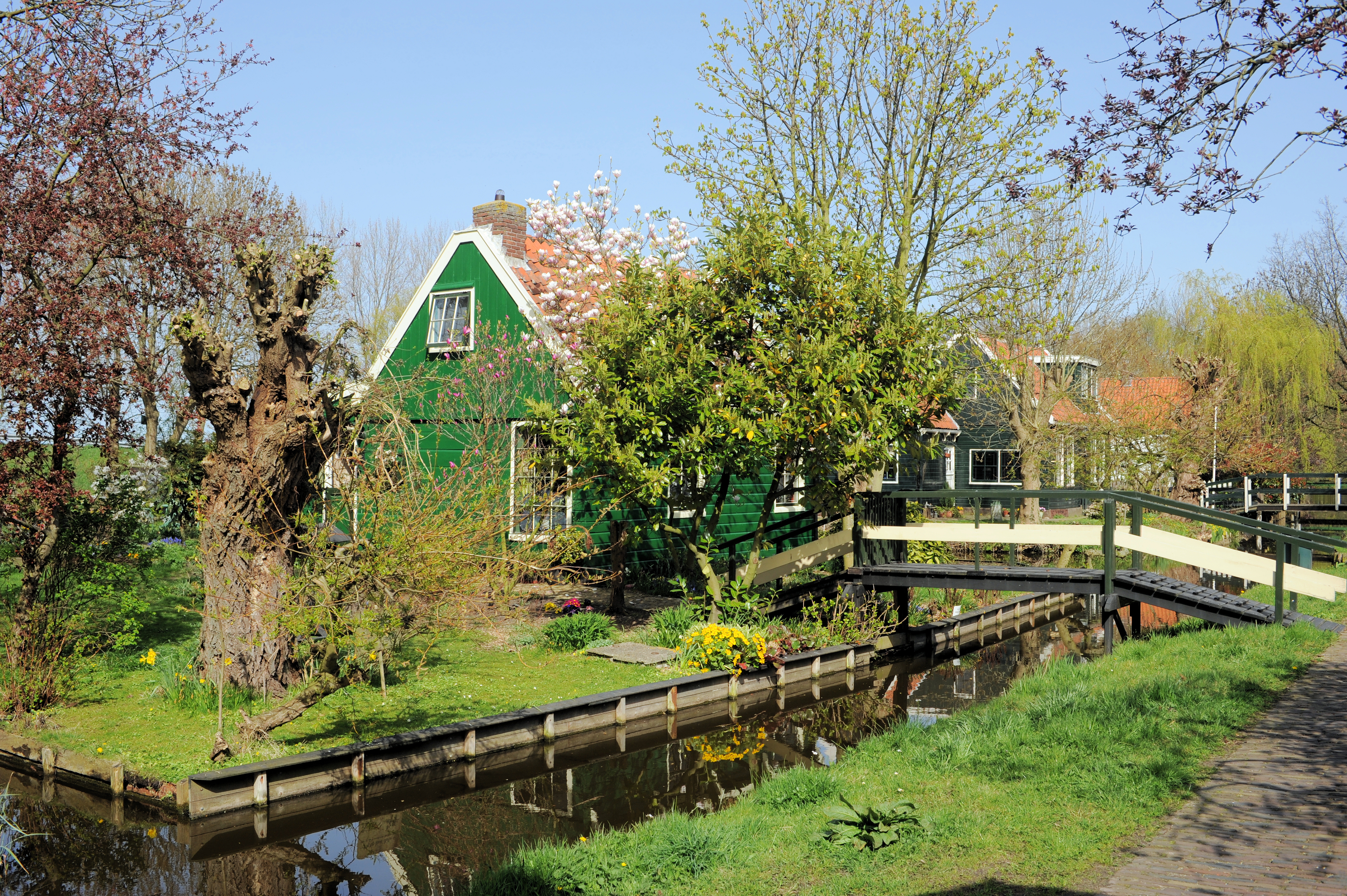
- Farm in Haaldersbroek

- Location in the Netherlands Location in the province of North Holland in the Netherlands
- Coordinates: 52°28′N 4°50′E
- Country: Netherlands
- Province: North Holland
- Municipality: Zaanstad
- Time zone: UTC+1 (CET)
  - Summer (DST): UTC+2 (CEST)

Haaldersbroek is a hamlet in Zaanstad, North Holland in the Netherlands. It is located in the southeast of Kalverpolder and next to Zaanse Schans.

The hamlet was first mentioned in historical records in the late 14th century. It is named after a swamp, which is now located in a part of Kalverpolder. The oldest house in Haaldersbroek dates from 1661. It is a former fishing village. It consists of about 150 people.
