= Hofgeest =

- Town
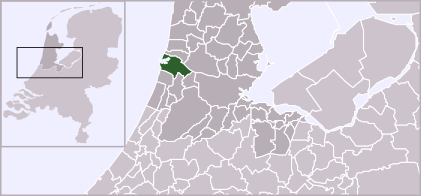

- Hofgeest in the municipality of Velsen.
- Coordinates: 52°27′N 4°39′E
- Country: Netherlands
- Province: North Holland
- Municipality: Velsen

Population (January 1, 2005)
  - Total: 110
- Time zone: UTC+1 (CET)
  - Summer (DST): UTC+2 (CEST)

Hofgeest is a town in the Dutch province of North Holland. It is a part of the municipality of Velsen, and lies about 7 km north of Haarlem.

The statistical area "Hofgeest", which also can include the surrounding countryside, has a population of around 110.
