= Ursel Bangert =

German physicist and researcher

- Education: University of Cologne
- Scientific career
- Workplaces: University of Cologne; University of Surrey; University of Manchester; Daresbury Laboratory; University of Limerick
- Thesis: Untersuchungen zur Thermolumineszenz natürlicher und synthetischer Calcite sowie ionenimplantierter, synthetischer Fluorite (1981)

Ursel Bangert is the Bernal Chair in Microscopy and Imaging at the University of Limerick as well as a Lecturer at the University of Manchester, of Research Fellow at Surrey University, and of PhD student at the Universität Köln. She develops advanced characterisation techniques such as transmission electron microscopy for the atomic scale imaging of novel materials. Her research outcomes include achievement of TEM imaging and electron energy loss spectroscopy on the sub-atomic scale to reveal structure and dynamics of individual atoms

== Early life and education ==
During her undergraduate studies Bangert was a high school teacher in Köln-Deutz. She completed both her undergraduate and postgraduate studies at the University of Cologne. Her doctoral research considers the thermoluminescence of natural and synthetic calcite.

== Research and career ==
After completing her doctorate, Bangert joined the faculty at the University of Cologne. She moved to the University of Surrey as a research fellow in the Department of Electrical Engineering. She was eventually made an Advanced Science and Engineering Research Council (SERC) Fellow and lecturer at the University of Surrey. In 1993 she joined University of Manchester Institute of Science and Technology as a lecturer in pure and applied physics. She was eventually appointed to the faculty at the University of Manchester, where she explored novel electron microscopies with ultrahigh spatial resolution. Bangert was responsible for the electron-optical facilities at Manchester, Liverpool and Daresbury Laboratory.

In particular, Bangert pioneered the use of electron energy loss spectroscopy to better understand the electronic structure of wide-bandgap semiconductors, diamond and carbon nanotubes. Whilst at Manchester, Bangert studied the two-dimensional material graphene. She was the first to use high-angle annular dark-field imaging (HAADF) to understand the atomic structure of graphene.

In 2014 Bangert was appointed the Bernal Chair in Microscopy and Imaging at the University of Limerick. At the University of Limerick, Bangert established an International Centre for Ultra-High Resolution Imaging and Characterisation. She raised funding to purchase a Thermo Fisher Scientific Titan Themis, which allows the imaging and spectroscopic characterisation of novel materials at the atomic scale.

== Select publications ==
- Mhairi H Gass; Ursel Bangert; Andrew L Bleloch; Peng Wang; Rahul R Nair; A K Geim (28 September 2008). "Free-standing graphene at atomic resolution". Nature Nanotechnology. 3 (11): 676–681. Bibcode:2008NatNa...3..676G. doi:10.1038/nnano.2008.280. ISSN 1748-3387. PMID 18989334. Wikidata Q79803769.
- Timothy J Booth; Peter Blake; Rahul R Nair; et al. (2 July 2008). "Macroscopic graphene membranes and their extraordinary stiffness". Nano Letters. 8 (8): 2442–2446. arXiv:0805.1884. Bibcode:2008NanoL...8.2442B. doi:10.1021/nl801412y. ISSN 1530-6984. PMID 18593201. Wikidata Q81559917.
- Recep Zan; Quentin Ramasse; Ursel Bangert; Konstantin Novoselov (10 July 2012). "Graphene reknits its holes". Nano Letters. 12 (8): 3936–3940. arXiv:1207.1487. Bibcode:2012NanoL..12.3936Z. doi:10.1021/nl300985q. ISSN 1530-6984. PMID 22765872. Wikidata Q56333291.
