= Oudesluis, Schagen =

Oudesluis
- Village
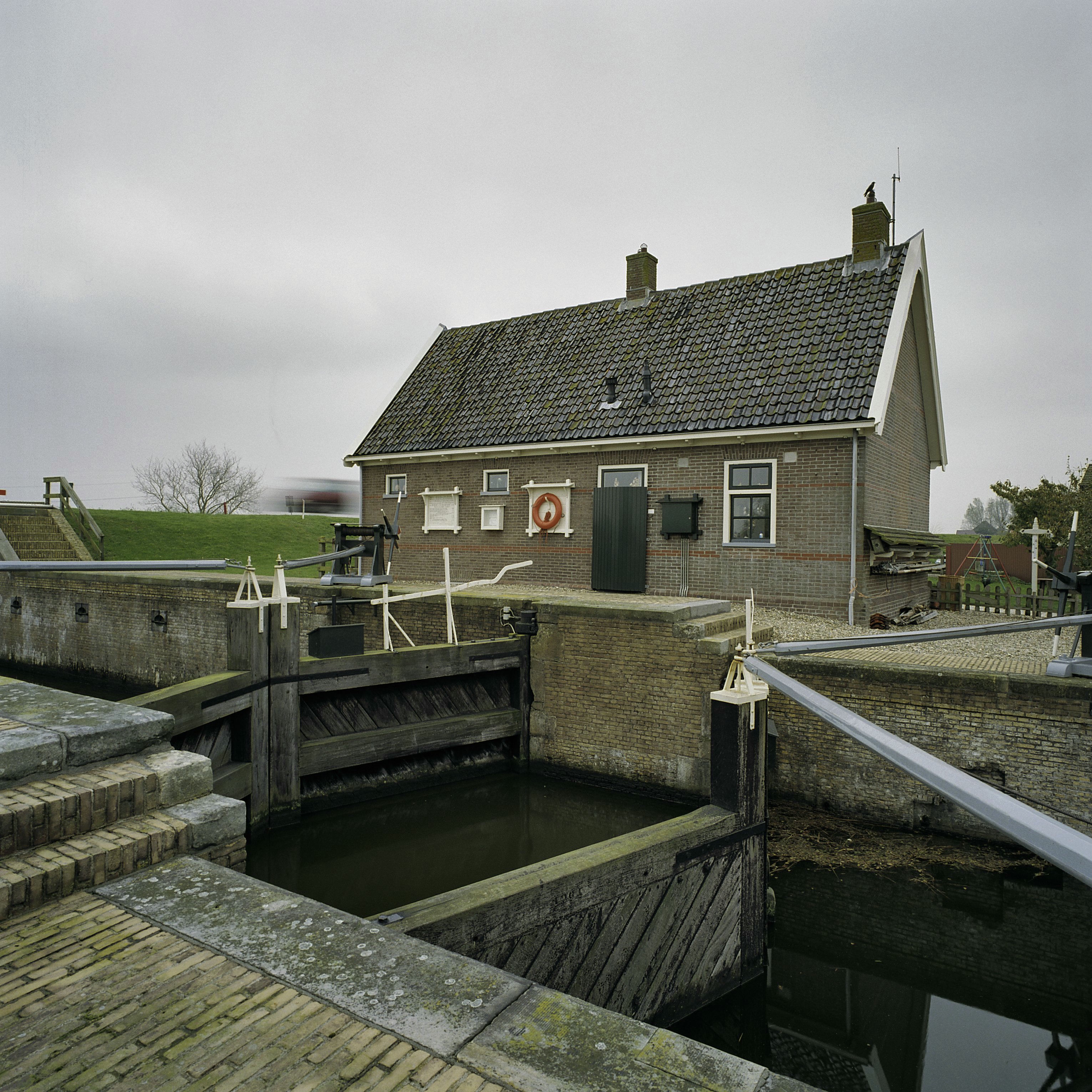
- The Old Sluice

- Location in the Netherlands Location in the province of North Holland in the Netherlands
- Coordinates: 52°50′N 4°49′E
- Country: Netherlands
- Province: North Holland
- Municipality: Schagen

Area
  - Village: 8.29 km^{2} (3.20 sq mi)
- Elevation: −1.2 m (−3.9 ft)

Population (2025)
  - Village: 700
  - Density: 84/km^{2} (220/sq mi)
  - Urban: 490
  - Rural: 215
- Time zone: UTC+1 (CET)
  - Summer (DST): UTC+2 (CEST)
- Postal code: 1757
- Dialing code: 0224

Oudesluis is a village in the Dutch province of North Holland. It is a part of the municipality of Schagen, and lies about 21 km south of Den Helder.

The village was first mentioned around 1660 as Duycker Sluys. The current name means "old sluice". Oude (old) has been added after the Wieringerwaard was poldered to distinguish from Nieuwesluis. Oude Sluis was located on the former Zuiderzee until 1845.

The former Dutch Reformed church was built in 1861, because the old church had been damaged in a storm in 1859. In 1982, the church was sold for ƒ to a foundation and is nowadays used for cultural activities.

In 1867, a railway station opened on the Amsterdam to Den Helder railway line. It closed in 1949.

== Gallery ==
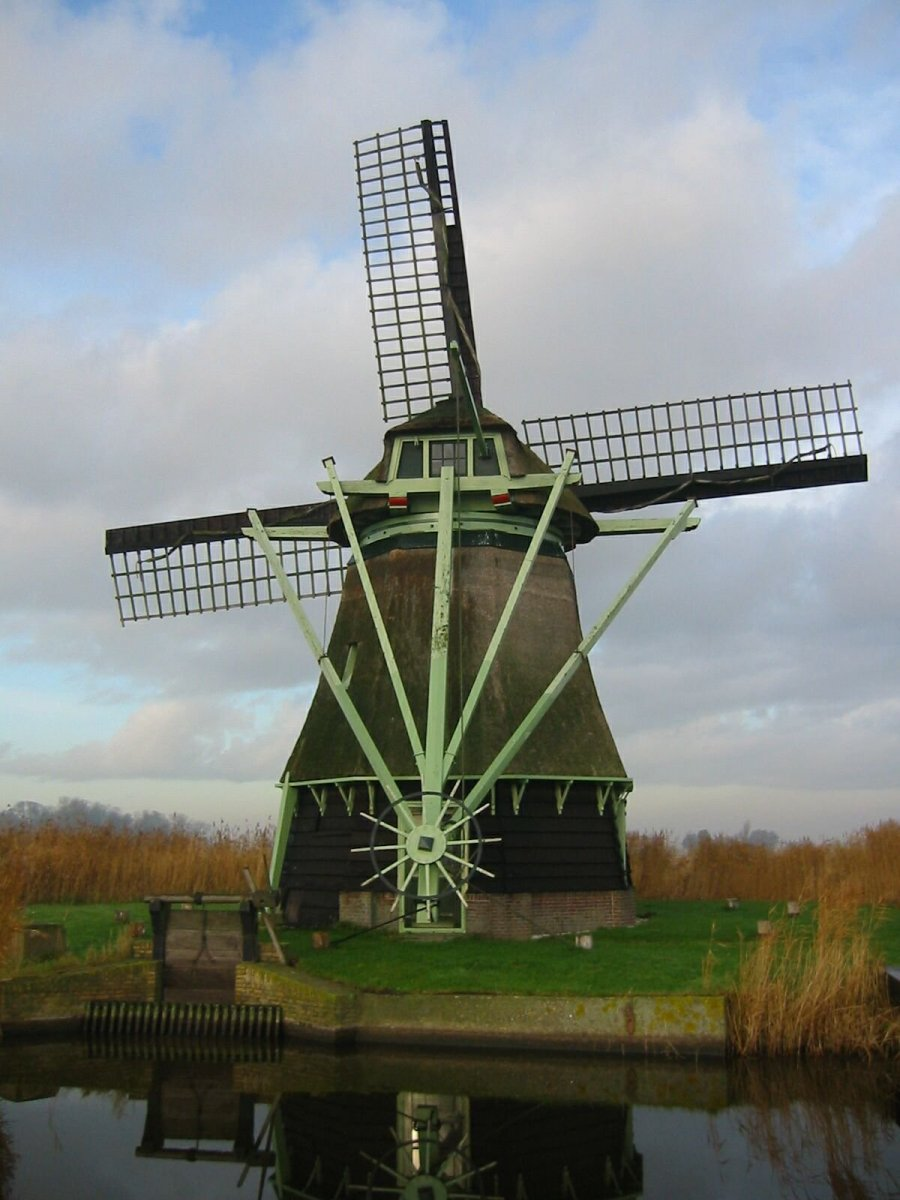
Windmill P

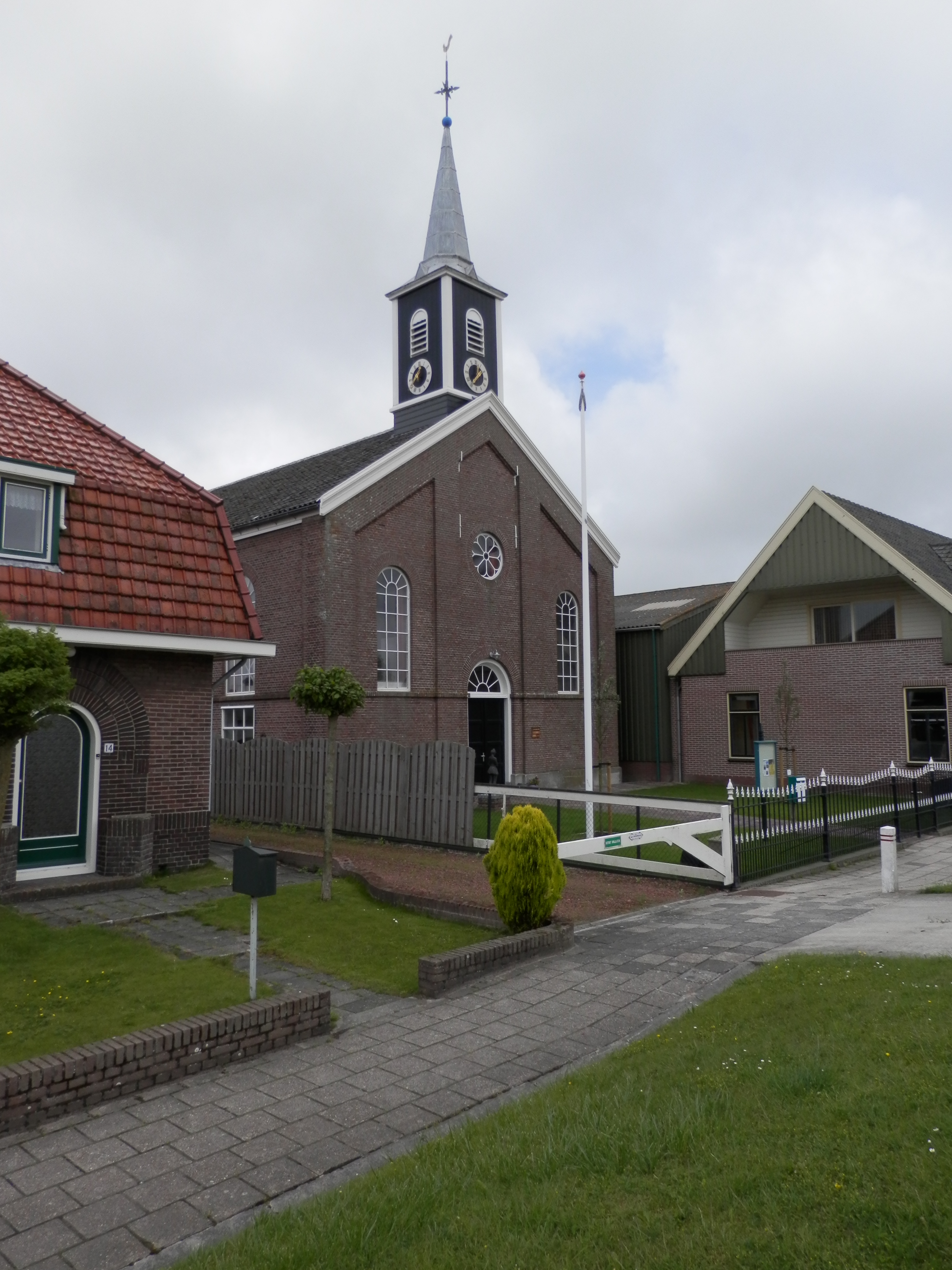
Dutch Reformed church

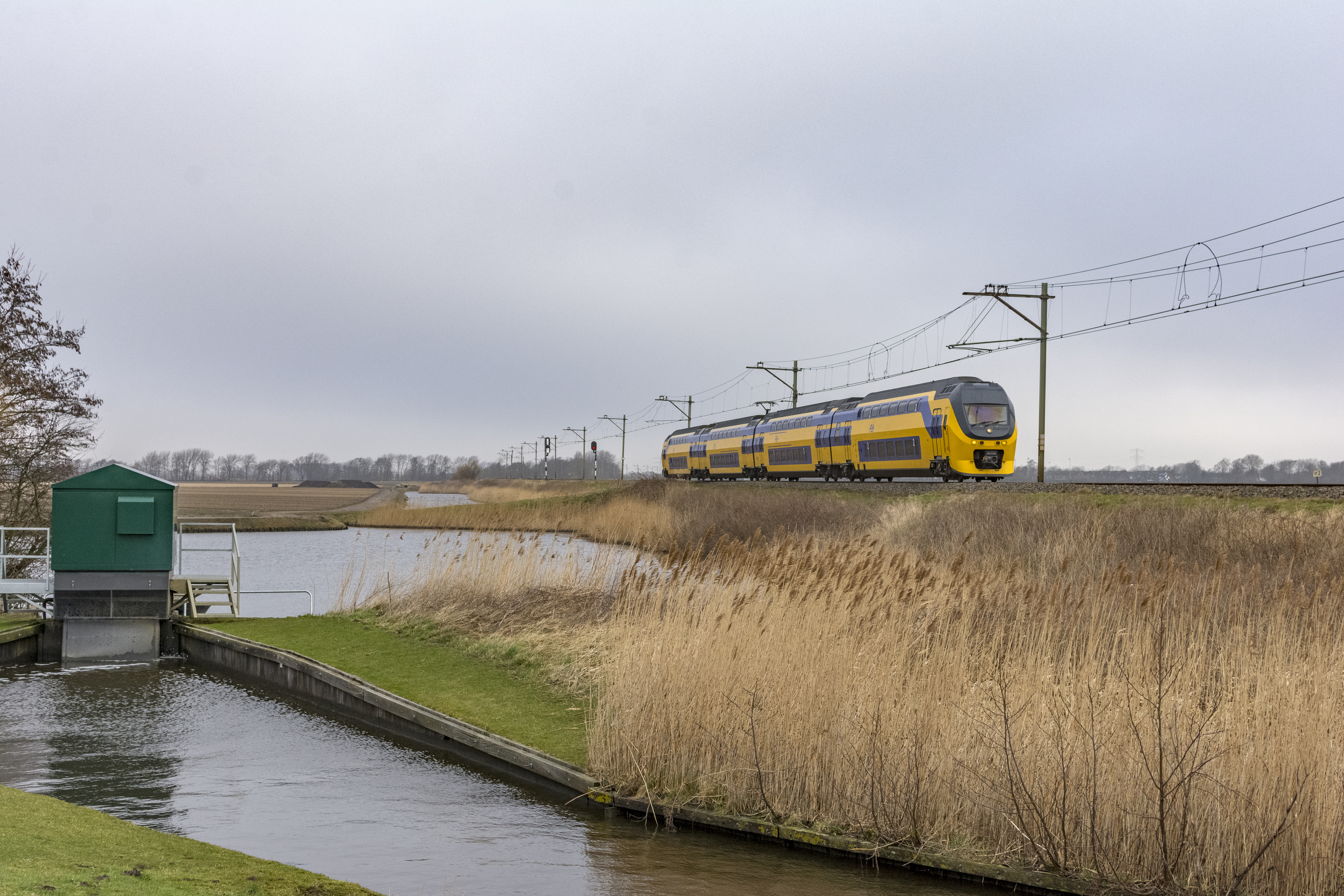
Train passing by
