= Noorddijk, North Holland =

Noorddijk
- Hamlet
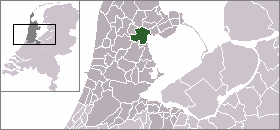

- Noorddijk in the municipality of Wester-Koggenland.
- Coordinates: 52°38′N 4°55′E
- Country: Netherlands
- Province: North Holland
- Municipality: Wester-Koggenland

Population (January 1, 2005)
  - Total: 420
- Time zone: UTC+1 (CET)
  - Summer (DST): UTC+2 (CEST)

Noorddijk is a hamlet in the Dutch province of North Holland. It is a part of the municipality of Wester-Koggenland, and lies about 7 km southeast of Heerhugowaard.

The statistical area "Noorddijk", which also can include the surrounding countryside, has a population of around 420.
