= Blauwe Keet =

- Interactive map of Blauwe Keet
- Coordinates: 52°53′44″N 4°46′55″E
- Country: Netherlands
- Province: North Holland
- Municipality: Den Helder

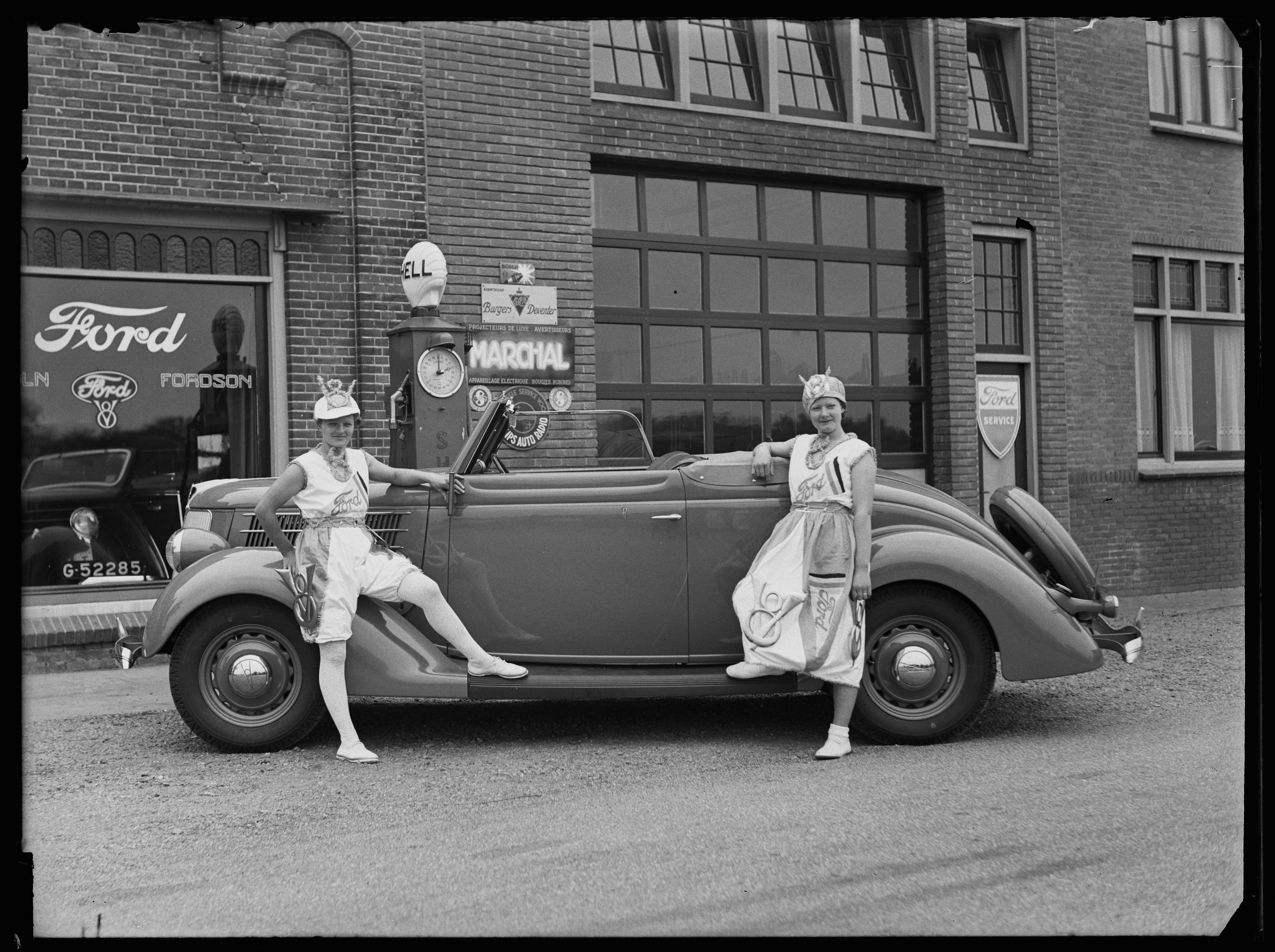
Garage in Blauwe Keet

Blauwe Keet (literally: Dutch: blue cabin) was a hamlet in the Dutch province of North Holland. It is a part of the municipality of Den Helder, and lies about 7 km south of the Den Helder city centre. The hamlet was demolished in 1987.

The hamlet was founded by the diggers of the nearby Noordhollandsch Kanaal in the early 19th century. Its name, "Blue Cabin", refers to the cabin from which the construction of the canal was directed.
