= Abbenes =

- Village
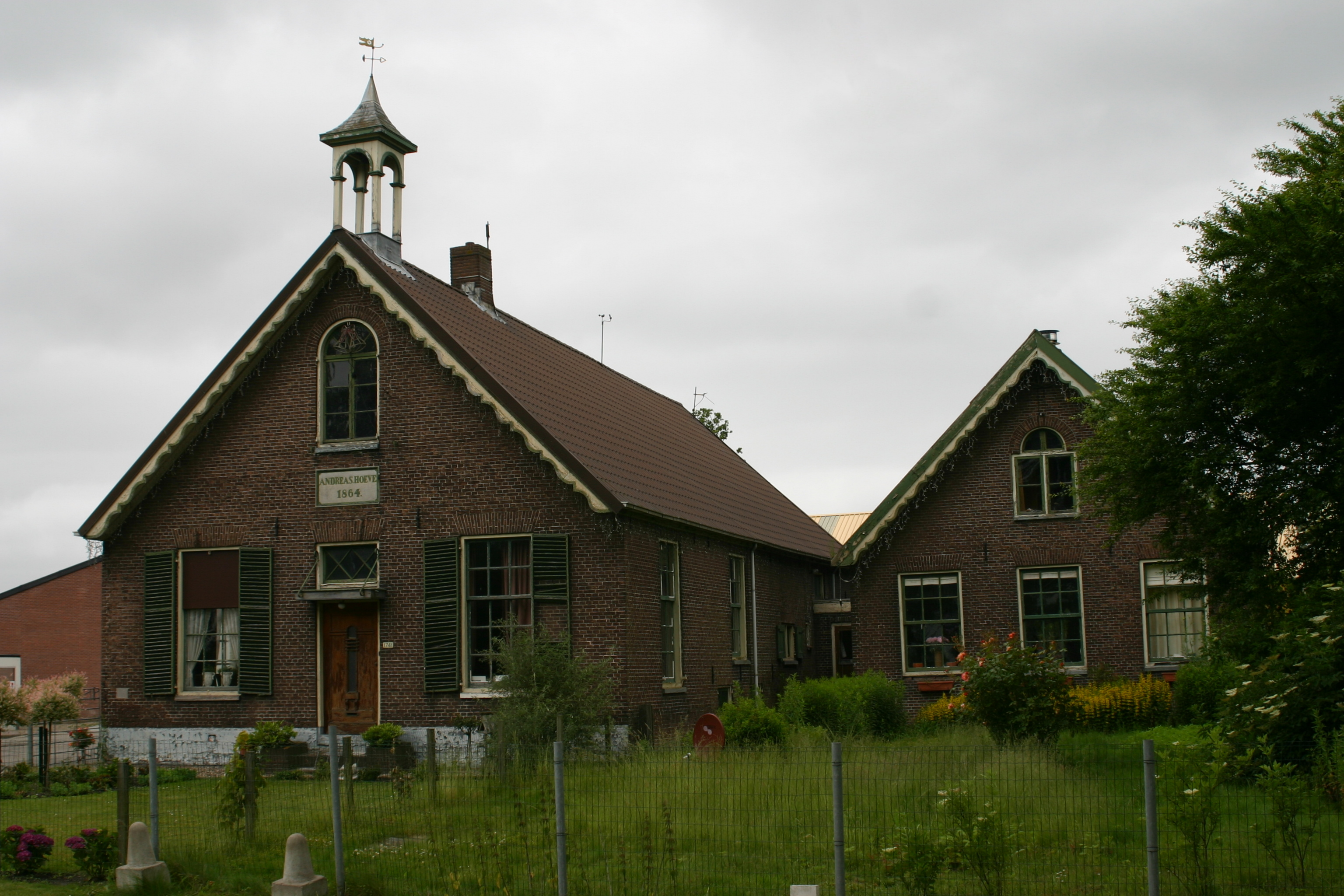

- Location in the Netherlands Location in the province of North Holland in the Netherlands
- Coordinates: 52°14′N 4°36′E
- Country: Netherlands
- Province: North Holland
- Municipality: Haarlemmermeer

Area
  - Total: 11.16 km^{2} (4.31 sq mi)
- Elevation: −4.5 m (−15 ft)

Population (2021)
  - Total: 1,085
  - Density: 97.22/km^{2} (251.8/sq mi)
- Time zone: UTC+1 (CET)
  - Summer (DST): UTC+2 (CEST)
- Postal code: 2157
- Dialing code: 0252

Abbenes is a village in the Dutch province of North Holland. It is a part of the municipality of Haarlemmermeer, and is situated about 10 kilometres (6.2 mi) southwest of Hoofddorp.

The village was first mentioned in 1867 as Abbenes, and is named after a lost island. The name means "headland of Abe (person)". Abbenes developed shortly after 1852 on the Hoofdvaart near a bridge.
