= Baarsdorpermeer =

- Hamlet
- Location in the Netherlands Location in the province of North Holland in the Netherlands
- Coordinates: 52°40′N 5°0′E
- Country: Netherlands
- Province: North Holland
- Municipality: Koggenland
- Village: Zuidermeer
- Elevation: −3.3 m (−11 ft)

Population (2025)
  - Total: 130
- Time zone: UTC+1 (CET)
  - Summer (DST): UTC+2 (CEST)
- Postcode: 1652
- Area code: 0229

Baarsdorpermeer is a hamlet and polder in the municipality of Koggenland in the province of North Holland in the Netherlands.

The hamlet is named after the water, which itself would have been named after an older place called Baarsdorp, which was first attested in 1345 as Barsdorp. This would probably have been a compound of the Middle Dutch Baer (a personal name) and dorp ('village'). The current place was mentioned in 1745 as Baersdorpermeer, which itself is a compound of Baersdorp and meer ('lake').

The hamlet formally falls under the village of Zuidermeer. The place is located in the extension of that village and continues to Lekermeer. It is located in the Baarsdorpmeerpolder and just west of the city of Hoorn. Until 1 January 1979 Baarsdorpermeer fell under the city and municipality of Berkhout. From 1979 to 2007 it belonged to the municipality of Wester-Koggenland, into which the municipality of Berkhout was merged.

Baarsdorpermeer falls almost entirely within the village area of Zuidermeer. Until the 1980s, that was a quarter of the place. This is also where most of the houses are found. As one travels further from the village centre, one also encounters more agricultural habitation. Baarsdorpermeer has one side road, which also dead ends at an agricultural company.

The water of De Kromme Leek starts at Baarsdorpermeer and continues to Medemblik. This water was an important drainage water before the exploitation of the peat area from the early Middle Ages and also after the exploitation. At the area border with Lekermeer and Wognum, the area still has the old typical type of local allotment. Further on, the winding course has been preserved as much as possible during the centuries-later land consolidation.
