= Bangert, North Holland =

Bangert
- Neighbourhood and former village
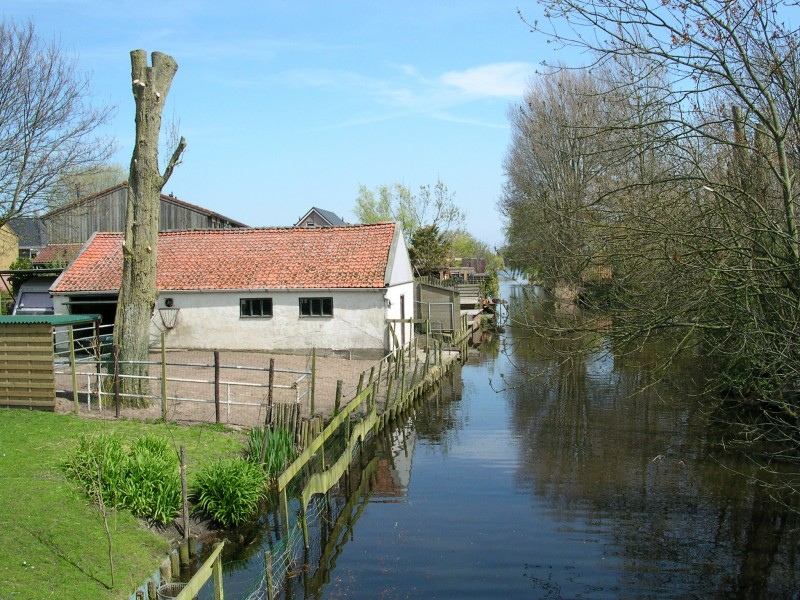

- Location in the Netherlands Location in the province of North Holland in the Netherlands
- Coordinates: 52°44′9.72″N 5°10′41.1″E
- Country: Netherlands
- Province: North Holland
- Municipality: Medemblik
- Village: Andijk

Area
  - Total: 0.73 km^{2} (0.28 sq mi)
- Elevation: −1.3 m (−4.3 ft)

Population (2025)
  - Total: 1,415
  - Density: 1,900/km^{2} (5,000/sq mi)
- Time zone: UTC+1 (CET)
  - Summer (DST): UTC+2 (CEST)
- Postal code: 1619
- Dialing code: 0228

Bangert is a neighbourhood of Andijk and former village in northwest Netherlands, located in Medemblik, North Holland.

Throughout its history Bangert has been competing with surrounding municipalities (esp. Andijk and Kerkbuurt) for land and population. For instance, in 1667 neighbouring Kerkbuurt acquired a church and began pulling away some of Bangert's inhabitants. In the 19th and 20th centuries, poverty combined with landgrabbing by Wervershoof also diminished the village.

Andijk annexed Bangert, Kerkbuurt and Munnikij which are now considered neighbourhoods of Andijk. In 2011, it became part of the Medemblik municipality.
