= Amsterdam Sloterdijk station =

Railway station in Amsterdam, Netherlands

Amsterdam Sloterdijk
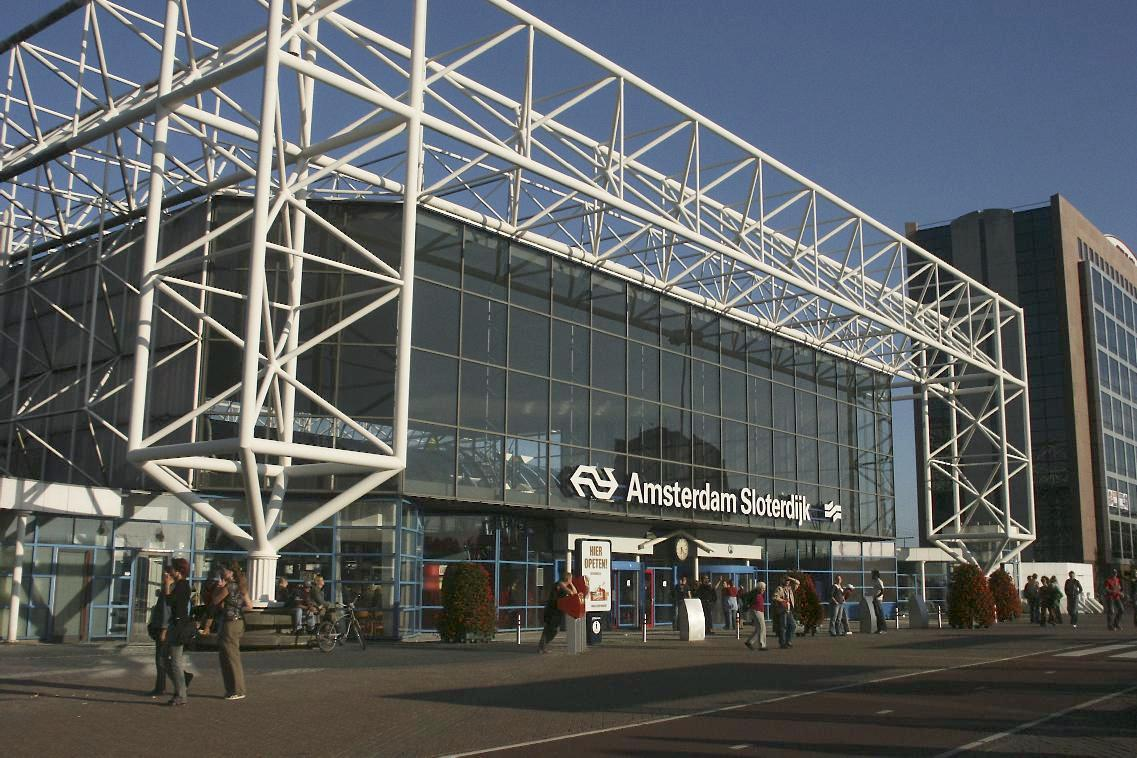

General information
- Location: Netherlands
- Coordinates: 52°23′21″N 4°50′17″E
- Operator: Nederlandse Spoorwegen
- Lines: Amsterdam–Rotterdam railway Den Helder–Amsterdam railway Amsterdam–Schiphol railway, Metro line 50, Metro line 51
- Platforms: 10 (train); 2 (metro)
- Connections: GVB Amsterdam Metro: 50, 51; GVB Amsterdam Tram: 19; Connexxion: 382, 395; EBS: 125, 309; GVB: 15, 22, 36, 61, 231, 232, 233, 369, N81; MeinFernbus Flixbus: 011, 044, 056, 067, 068, 069, 075, 800, 802, 810, N44, N61, N67, N75, N800, X31

Construction
- Platform levels: 3
- Cycle facilities: OV-fiets

Other information
- Station code: Ass

History
- Opened: 29 May 1983; 43 years ago
Services
Preceding station	Nederlandse Spoorwegen	Following station
Haarlem towards Den Haag Centraal	NS Intercity 2100	Amsterdam Centraal Terminus
Haarlem towards Vlissingen	NS Intercity 2200	Amsterdam Centraal Terminus
Haarlem towards Vlissingen	NS Intercity 2300 Mon-Fri until 20:00	Amsterdam Centraal Terminus
Zaandam towards Alkmaar	NS Intercity 2700 Mon-Thur until 19:00	Amsterdam Centraal towards Maastricht
Zaandam towards Alkmaar	NS Intercity 2700 Fri-Sun until 19:00	Amsterdam Centraal Terminus
Hoorn towards Enkhuizen	NS Intercity 2900 After 19:00 and Fri-Sun only	Amsterdam Centraal towards Maastricht
Zaandam towards Den Helder	NS Intercity 3000	Amsterdam Centraal towards Nijmegen
Purmerend towards Enkhuizen	NS Intercity 3700 Mon-Thur Peak Only	Amsterdam Centraal Terminus
Hoorn towards Enkhuizen	NS Intercity 3900 Mon-Thur until 19:30	Amsterdam Centraal towards Heerlen
Zaandam towards Uitgeest	NS Sprinter 4000	Amsterdam Centraal towards Rotterdam Centraal
Amsterdam Lelylaan towards Hoofddorp	NS Sprinter 4100	Zaandam towards Hoorn Kersenboogerd
Halfweg-Zwanenburg towards Hoorn	NS Sprinter 4800	Amsterdam Centraal Terminus
Halfweg-Zwanenburg towards Zandvoort	NS Sprinter 5400	Amsterdam Centraal Terminus
Zaandam towards Uitgeest	NS Sprinter 7400 Peak hours only	Amsterdam Centraal towards Driebergen-Zeist
Amsterdam Lelylaan towards Hoofddorp	NS Sprinter 8100	Amsterdam Centraal Terminus
Amsterdam Lelylaan towards Hoofddorp	NS Sprinter 8200	Amsterdam Centraal Terminus
Amsterdam Lelylaan towards Hoofddorp	NS Sprinter 8300	Amsterdam Centraal Terminus
Amsterdam Lelylaan towards Hoofddorp	NS Sprinter 8400	Amsterdam Centraal Terminus
Preceding station	Amsterdam Metro	Following station
De Vlugtlaan towards Gein	Line 50	Isolatorweg Terminus
De Vlugtlaan towards Centraal Station	Line 51	Isolatorweg Terminus
Location
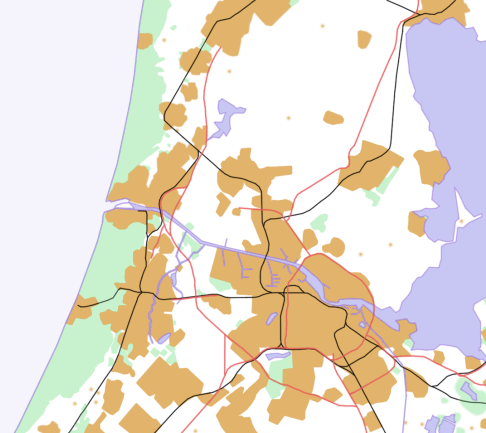
- Location within Northern Randstad Location within Netherlands

Amsterdam Sloterdijk is a major railway junction to the west of Amsterdam Centraal station. It is at a rail-rail crossing, with an additional chord (Hemboog). It is on the railway line from Amsterdam Centraal to Haarlem and the last station before the junction where the line Amsterdam Centraal-Zaandam diverges from it and on the crossing west branch of the Amsterdam–Schiphol railway line between Schiphol and Amsterdam Centraal.

The Hemboog chord connects the crossing lines, providing a direct connection between Schiphol and Zaandam. There are platforms at both crossing lines and at the Hemboog; for the latter there is a separate entrance on another side of the station square.

NS Amsterdam Sloterdijk station has an OV-Fiets point where you can rent a bicycle.

Two lines of the Amsterdam Metro stop at Sloterdijk: 50 and 51. The metro platform is located above ground and accessible through the station's mail hall.

The station also serves as an international bus terminal. Multiple lines of the international bus operator Flixbus stop at the lower ground level at the back of the Amsterdam Sloterdijk station building.

== History ==
The original Amsterdam Sloterdijk station was opened in 1956 just south of the current station. Sloterdijk was then just a small village. From there, one could travel to Haarlem; the line to Zaandam took a more northeasterly route via the Hembrug.

In 1983, the line to Zaandam was rerouted via the Hemtunnel, and the current station was opened, initially with the name Sloterdijk Noord. The old station was renamed to Sloterdijk Zuid and closed in 1985, when the line to Haarlem was rerouted via the current station, which was renamed to Sloterdijk at the same time. The platforms for both lines are at the lower level.

In 1986, the Amsterdam-Schiphol line was opened, with platforms at the upper level. The Hemboog, connecting Schiphol to Zaandam, was opened in 2003 but had no platforms at Sloterdijk until they were opened on 14 December 2008, with a separate entrance.

== Accidents and incidents ==
- On 21 April 2012, two passenger trains collided head-on between Amsterdam Centraal railway station and Sloterdijk railway station, injuring 117 people. The cause of the accident was the driver of one of the trains passing a signal at danger.
- On 14 December 2016, a Sprinter train was evacuated at the station due to a fire in a toilet. Arson is suspected to be the cause.

== Station layout ==
At the ground level is the railway from Amsterdam to Haarlem and Zaandam, with branches to Alkmaar, Purmerend, and Hoorn; at elevated level is the railway from Amsterdam to Amsterdam Airport Schiphol (and thence to Leiden and The Hague). The booking hall is at an intermediate raised level (as too, is the station square). On the south-west side of the crossing and beside the station square runs the Hemboog chord, connecting Schiphol and Amsterdam Lelylaan to Zaandam. The platforms on the Hemboog are numbered platforms 9 and 10.

== Train services ==
As of 15 December 2025, the following train services call at this station:

=== National Rail ===
Train	Operator(s)	From	Via	To	Freq.	Service
InterCity 2100	NS	Amsterdam Centraal	Amsterdam Sloterdijk - Haarlem - Heemstede-Aerdenhout - Leiden Centraal	Den Haag Centraal	2/hour	Does not run after 10.00 pm; Also calling at Heemstede-Aerdenhout
InterCity 2200	NS	Amsterdam Centraal	Amsterdam Sloterdijk - Haarlem - Heemstede-Aerdenhout - Leiden Centraal - Den Haag Laan van NOI - Den Haag HS - Delft - Schiedam Centrum - Rotterdam Centraal - Rotterdam Blaak - Dordrecht - Roosendaal - Bergen op Zoom - Rilland-Bath - Krabbendijk - Kruiningen-Yerseke - Kapelle-Biezelinge - Goes - Arnemuiden - Middelburg - Vlissingen Souburg	Vlissingen	1-2/hour	Also calling at Heemstede-Aerdenhout, Den Haag Laan van NOI, Schiedam Centrum, Rotterdam Blaak, Rilland-Bath, Krabbendijk, Kruiningen-Yerseke, Kapelle-Biezelinge, Arnemuiden and Vlissingen Souburg. On weekdays this series runs a 1 hour service together with Intercity 2300 creating a 2 hour service. After 8 pm and on weekends this series forms 2 hour service.
InterCity 2300	NS	Amsterdam Centraal	Amsterdam Sloterdijk - Haarlem - Heemstede-Aerdenhout - Leiden Centraal - Den Haag Laan van NOI - Den Haag HS - Delft - Schiedam Centrum - Rotterdam Centraal - Rotterdam Blaak - Dordrecht - Roosendaal - Bergen op Zoom - Goes - Middelburg	Vlissingen	1/hour	Only runs on weekdays until 8 pm. Together with Intercity 2200 they form a 2 hour service.
InterCity 2700	NS	Den Helder	Den Helder Zuid - Anna Paulowna - Schagen - Heerhugowaard - Alkmaar Noord - Alkmaar - Castricum - Zaandam - Amsterdam Sloterdijk - Amsterdam Centraal - Amsterdam Amstel - Utrecht Centraal - 's-Hertogenbosch - Eindhoven - Weert - Roermond - Sittard	Maastricht	2/hour	Runs on Mondays till Thursdays until 19:00; Runs on Fridays until 19:00, Saturdays between 9:00 and 19:00 and Sundays between 10:00 and 21:30 only between Alkmaar and Amsterdam Centraal; Runs only between Alkmaar and Schagen during peak hours; Runs only between Alkmaar and Den Helder during peak hours and in the peak direction (morning Den Helder → Schagen, evening Schagen → Den Helder); Also calling at Den Helder Zuid, Anna Paulowna, Schagen, Heerhugowaard and Alkmaar Noord
InterCity 2900	NS	Enkhuizen	Bovenkarspel Flora - Bovenkarspel-Grootebroek - Hoogkarspel - Hoorn Kersenboogerd - Hoorn - Amsterdam Sloterdijk - Amsterdam Centraal - Amsterdam Amstel - Utrecht Centraal - 's-Hertogenbosch - Eindhoven - Weert - Roermond - Sittard	Maastricht	2/hour	Runs only after 9.00 p.m. and on Fridays, Saturdays and Sundays; Not calling at Zaandam; Also calling at Hoorn Kersenboogerd, Hoogkarspel, Bovenkarspel-Grootebroek and Bovenkarspel Flora
InterCity 3000	NS	Nijmegen	Arnhem Centraal - Ede-Wageningen - Veenendaal-De Klomp - Driebergen-Zeist - Utrecht Centraal - Amsterdam Amstel - Amsterdam Centraal - Sloterdijk - Zaandam - Castricum - Heiloo - Alkmaar - Alkmaar Noord - Heerhugowaard - Schagen - Anna Paulowna - Den Helder Zuid	Den Helder	2/hour	Also calling at Veenendaal-De Klomp, Heiloo, Alkmaar Noord, Heerhugowaard, Schagen, Anna Paulowna and Den Helder Zuid; Calls after 8.00 p.m. also at Driebergen-Zeist
InterCity 3700	NS	Amsterdam Centraal	Amsterdam Sloterdijk - Purmerend - Hoorn - Hoorn Kersenboogerd - Hoogkarspel - Bovenkarspel-Grootebroek - Bovenkarspel Flora	Enkhuizen	2/hour	Peak hours and peak direction only (morning Enkhuizen → Amsterdam Centraal, evening Amsterdam Centraal → Enkhuizen); Not calling at Zaandam; Also calling at Purmerend, Hoorn Kersenboogerd, Hoogkarspel, Bovenkarspel-Grootebroek and Bovenkarspel Flora
InterCity 3900	NS	Enkhuizen	Bovenkarspel Flora - Bovenkarspel-Grootebroek - Hoogkarspel - Hoorn Kersenboogerd - Hoorn - Amsterdam Sloterdijk - Amsterdam Centraal - Amsterdam Amstel - Utrecht Centraal - 's-Hertogenbosch - Eindhoven - Weert - Roermond - Sittard	Heerlen	2/hour	Runs only from Monday to Thursday until 7.30 p.m. between Enkhuizen and Sittard; Not calling at Zaandam; Also calling at Hoorn Kersenboogerd, Hoogkarspel, Bovenkarspel-Grootebroek and Bovenkarspel Flora
Sprinter 4000	NS	Rotterdam Centraal	Rotterdam Noord - Rotterdam Alexander - Capelle Schollevaar - Nieuwerkerk aan den IJssel - Gouda - Gouda Goverwelle - Woerden - Breukelen - Abcoude - Amsterdam Holendrecht - Amsterdam Bijlmer ArenA - Duivendrecht - Amsterdam Amstel - Amsterdam Muiderpoort - Amsterdam Centraal - Amsterdam Sloterdijk - Zaandam - Koog aan de Zaan - Zaandijk Zaanse Schans - Wormerveer - Krommenie-Assendelft	Uitgeest	2/hour	
Sprinter 4100	NS	Hoorn Kersenboogerd	Hoorn - Purmerend Overwhere - Purmerend - Purmerend Weidevenne - Zaandam Kogerveld - Zaandam - Amsterdam Sloterdijk - Amsterdam Lelylaan - Schiphol Airport	Hoofddorp	2/hour	
Sprinter 4800	NS	Amsterdam Centraal	Amsterdam Sloterdijk - Halweg-Zwanenburg - Haarlem Spaarnwoude - Haarlem - Bloemendaal - Santpoort Zuid - Santpoort Noord - Driehuis - Beverwijk - Heemskerk - Uitgeest - Castricum - Heiloo - Alkmaar - Alkmaar Noord - Heerhugowaard - Obdam	Hoorn	2/hour	Runs only 1x per hour between Alkmaar and Hoorn after 8.00 p.m.
Sprinter 5400	NS	Amsterdam Centraal	Amsterdam Sloterdijk - Halweg-Zwanenburg - Haarlem Spaarnwoude - Haarlem - Overveen	Zandvoort aan Zee	2/hour	
Sprinter 7400	NS	Uitgeest	Krommenie-Assendelft - Wormerveer - Zaandijk Zaanse Schans - Koog aan de Zaan - Zaandam - Amsterdam Sloterdijk - Amsterdam Centraal - Amsterdam Muiderpoort - Amsterdam Amstel - Amsterdam Bijlmer ArenA - Duivendrecht - Amsterdam Holendrecht - Abcoude - Breukelen - Utrecht Zuilen -Utrecht Centraal - Utrecht Vaartsche Rijn - Bunnik - Driebergen-Zeist - Maarn - Veenendaal West - Veenendaal Centrum	Rhenen	2/hour	Only on rush hour.
Sprinter 8100	NS	Hoofddorp	Schiphol Airport - Amsterdam Lelylaan - Amsterdam Sloterdijk	Amsterdam Centraal	2/hour	
Sprinter 8200	NS	Hoofddorp	Schiphol Airport - Amsterdam Lelylaan - Amsterdam Sloterdijk	Amsterdam Centraal	2/hour	
Sprinter 8300	NS	Hoofddorp	Schiphol Airport - Amsterdam Lelylaan - Amsterdam Sloterdijk	Amsterdam Centraal	2/hour	
Sprinter 8400	NS	Hoofddorp	Schiphol Airport - Amsterdam Lelylaan - Amsterdam Sloterdijk	Amsterdam Centraal	2/hour	

== Amsterdam Metro ==
Amsterdam Sloterdijk is also a station on the Amsterdam Metro lines 50 and 51. This metro service was opened in 1997. It runs next to the railway line for Sloterdijk to Holendrecht.

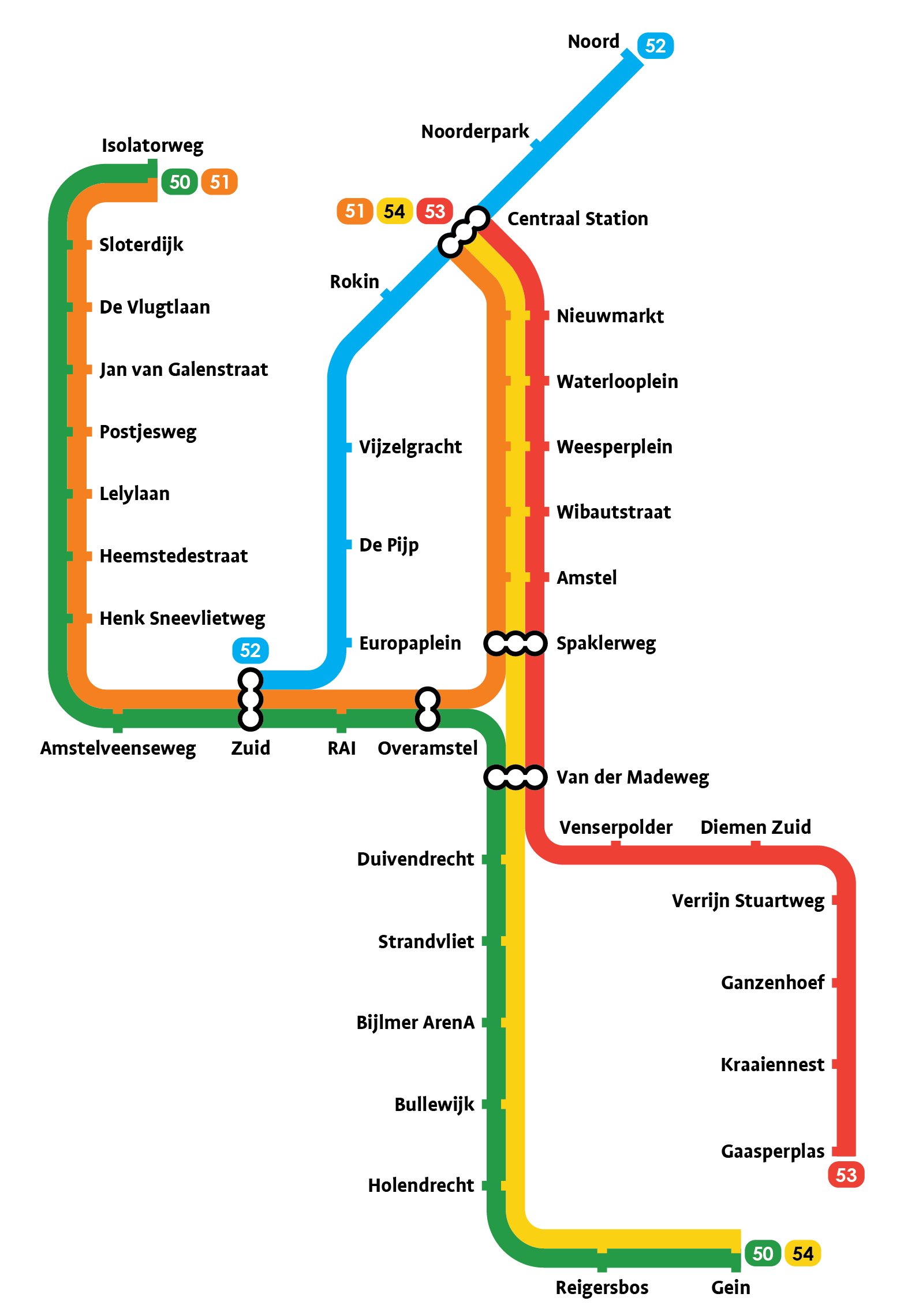
Amsterdam Metro network

Metro Route	Operator	From	To	Via	Frequency
50	GVB	Gein	Isolatorweg	Reigersbos, Station Holendrecht, Bullewijk, Station Bijlmer ArenA, Strandvliet, Station Duivendrecht, Van der Madeweg, Overamstel, Station RAI, Station Zuid, Amstelveenseweg, Henk Sneevlietweg, Heemstedestraat, Station Lelylaan, Postjesweg, Jan van Galenstraat, De Vlugtlaan, Station Sloterdijk	7.5/hour (peak hours), 5-6/hour (evenings, Sat-Sun)
51	GVB	Centraal Station	Isolatorweg	Nieuwmarkt, Waterlooplein, Weesperplein, Wibautstraat, Amstelstation, Spaklerweg, Overamstel, Station RAI, Station Zuid, Amstelveenseweg, Henk Sneevlietweg, Heemstedestraat, Station Lelylaan, Postjesweg, Jan van Galenstraat, De Vlugtlaan, Station Sloterdijk	8/hour (peak hours), 6/hour (Mon-Sun until 8.00 pm), 5/hour (from 8.00 pm, Sat-Sun until 10.00 am)

== Tram service ==
The tram service departs from the ground floor bus station which opened in December 2010, known as the Carrascoplein.

GVB operates 1 tram service to Sloterdijk.

Operator	Line	Route	Service
GVB	19	Station Sloterdijk - Bos en Lommer - Elandsgracht - Leidseplein - Vijzelgracht - Weesperplein - Watergraafsmeer - Diemen Sniep	

== Bus services ==
Bus services operated by GVB, EBS and Connexxion depart from the ground floor bus station which opened in December 2010, known as the Carrascoplein.

=== Short-distance services ===
Operator	Line	Route	Service	
GVB	15	Station Sloterdijk - Bos en Lommer - Surinameplein - Haarlemmermeerstation - Station Zuid		
GVB	22	Station Sloterdijk - Spaarndammerbuurt - Centraal Station - Indische buurt - Muiderpoortstation		
GVB	36	Station Sloterdijk - Molenwijk - Banne Buiksloot - Station Noord		
GVB	61	Station Sloterdijk - Geuzenveld - Osdorpplein		
EBS	125	Amsterdam Sloterdijk - Amsterdam Molenwijk - Landsmeer - Den Ilp - Purmerland - Purmerend Tramplein		
GVB	231	Station Sloterdijk - Westpoort - Abberdaan	Peak hours only	
GVB	232	Station Sloterdijk- Durbanweg	Peak hours only	
GVB	233	Station Sloterdijk - Siciliëweg	Peak hours only	
EBS	309	Amsterdam Sloterdijk - Amsterdam Molenwijk - Landsmeer - Den Ilp - Purmerland - Purmerend Tramplein	Peak hours only	Bus service under the brand R-net
Connexxion	382	Amsterdam Sloterdijk - Amsterdam Westpoort - Haarlemmerliede - Velsen Zuid - IJmuiden (- IJmuiden aan Zee)		Bus service under the brand R-net
Connexxion	395	Amsterdam Sloterdijk - Zaandam De Vlinder - Zaandam ZMC		Bus service under the brand R-net
GVB	369	Station Sloterdijk - Osdorp - Nieuw-Sloten - Schiphol-Noord - Schiphol Airport/Plaza		Bus service under the brand R-net
GVB	N81	Station Sloterdijk - Spaarndammerbuurt - Centraal Station	Nightservice every friday, saturday and sunday night	

=== Long-distance services ===
Operator	Line	Route	Freq.	Service
Arriva Touring		Amsterdam Sloterdijk - Groningen - Oldenburg Hbf - Hannover ZOB - Hannover ZOB am Hbf	2/day	
Flixbus	011	Amsterdam Sloterdijk - Isselburg Autohoff* - Duisburg Hbf - Düsseldorf ZOB am Hbf - Köln Flughafen CGN (Terminal 2)* - Saarbrücken Fernbusbahnhof* - Strasbourg Place de l'Étroile* - Kehl Bahnhof - Freiburg Hbf	1/week	
Flixbus	027	Amsterdam Sloterdijk - Duisburg Hbf - Düsseldorf ZOB am Hbf - Köln Flughafen CGN (Terminal 2)* - Darmstadt Hbf - Mannheim ZOB am Hbf - Heidelberg Hbf - Karlsruhe Hbf - Stuttgart Airport Busterminal - Augsburg P+R Augsburg Nord* - München Hackerbrücke/ZOB	2/week	
Flixbus	056	Amsterdam Sloterdijk - Utrecht Centraal - Arnhem Centraal - Bocholt Bahnhof* - Oberhausen Hbf - Moers Busbahnhof - Müllheim an der Ruhr Hbf - Essen Hbf - Dortmund ZOB am Hbf - Neheim-Hüsten Bahnhof* - Meschede Busbahnhof* - Bödefeld Sankt-Vitus-Schützenstraße - Siedlinghausen Hochsauerlandstraße - Winterberg Bahnhofstraße - Medebach Center Parcs* - Willingen (Upland) Waldecker Straße*	14/week	Some services are not calling at Utrecht Centraal, Arnhem Centraal, Bocholt Bahnhof, Oberhausen Hbf, Moers Busbahnhof, Mülheim an der Ruhr Hbf, Essen Hbf and Bochum Hbf; Most services terminate at Dortmund ZOB am Hbf
Flixbus	068	Amsterdam Sloterdijk - Utrecht Centraal - Isselburg Autohof* - Duisburg Hbf - Düsseldorf ZOB am Hbf - Köln Flughafen CGN (Terminal 2)* - Frankfurt (Main) Hbf - Würzburg Hbf - Scheinfurt Hbf - Bamberg Bahnhof - Bayreuth Bahnhof - Bayreuth Universität (Mensa)*	2/day	One service a day terminates at Frankfurt (Main) Hbf
Flixbus	075	Rotterdam Centraal - Den Haag (The Hague) Centraal - Amsterdam Sloterdijk - Drachten Vallaat* - Groningen - Leer Bahnhof* - Uplengen Autohof Apen-Remels* - Westerstede ZOB* - Oldenburg Hbf - Bremen Hbf - Hamburg ZOB am Hbf	5/day	One service/day toward Hamburg ZOB am Hbf runs from/to Rotterdam Centraal; Four services/day toward Hamburg ZOB am Hbf run from/to Amsterdam Sloterdijk; Some services are not calling at Oldenburg Hbf and Bremen Hbf; On some services the request stops Drachten Vallaat, Leer Bahnhof, Uplengen Autohof Apen-Remels and Westerstede ZOB are not available
Flixbus	120	Amsterdam Sloterdijk - Nijmegen Tunnelweg - Goch Bahnhof* - Krefeld ZOB am Hbf - Mönchengladbach Hbf - Düsseldorf ZOB am Hbf - Leverkusen Mitte - Bergisch Gladbach Refrath - Siegen Koblenzer Straße - Wetzlar Bahnhof - Gießen Mathematikum- Marburg (Lahn) Hbf (Krummbogen) - Alsfeld Bahnhof* - Erfurt Hbf - Jena Busbahnhof Paradies - Leipzig Hbf	7/week	Some services terminate at Marburg (Lahn) Hbf (Krummbogen); Some services toward Amsterdam Sloterdijk terminate at Düsseldorf ZOB am Hbf; Some services are not calling at Nijmegen, Bergisch Gladbach Refrath and Wetzlar Bahnhof; On some services the request stop Goch Bahnhof is not available
Flixbus	175	Rotterdam Centraal - Den Haag (The Hague) Centraal - Amsterdam Sloterdijk - Groningen - Westerstede ZOB* - Oldenburg Hbf/ZOB - Bremen Hbf - Hannover ZOB	11/week	Some services between Rotterdam Centraal and Amsterdam Sloterdijk; Some services toward Hannover ZOB run from/to Amsterdam Sloterdijk
Flixbus	800	Alkmaar/Schiphol Airport plaza - Amsterdam Sloterdijk - Utrecht Centraal - Den Haag (The Hague) Centraal - Rotterdam Centraal - Breda Centraal - Antwerp Koningin Astridplein - Gent Dampoort - Lille Europe/Paris Charles de Gaulle (Terminal 3) - Paris Bercy Seine - Crétiel Centre Université - Aéroport Orly Sud (P6)	4-9/day	1/day service from Alkmaar terminates at Paris Bercy Seine via Paris Charles de Gaulle (Terminal 3); 1/day service from Schiphol Airport Plaza terminates at Paris Bercy Seine; 1/day service from Amsterdam Sloterdijk terminates at Aéroport Orly Sud (P6); Most services run from/to Amsterdam Sloterdijk; Some services are not calling at Utrecht Centraal, Den Haag (The Hague) Centraal, Rotterdam Centraal, Breda Centraal, Antwerp Koningin Astridplein, Gent Dampoort, Lille Europe and Paris Charles de Gaulle (Terminal 3)
Flixbus	802	Schiphol Airport Plaza - Amsterdam Sloterdijk - Antwerp Koningin Astridplein - Gent Dampoort - Brugge Bargeplein - Lille Europe - Paris Charles de Gaulle (Terminal 3) - Paris Bercy Seine	2-4/day	Some services run to Schiphol Airport Plaza; Most services run between Amsterdam Sloterdijk and Brugge Bargeplein, calling at all stops; Some services run between Gent Dampoort and Paris Bercy Seine via Paris Charles de Gaulle (Terminal 3); Some services are not calling at Antwerp Koningin Astridplein, Gent Dampoort and Paris Charles de Gaulle (Terminal 3)
Flixbus	805	Leeuwarden Busstation - Harlingen - Den Oever Busstation* - Wieringerwerf Motel* - Amsterdam Sloterdijk - Schiphol Airport Plaza - Rotterdam Centraal - Gent Dampoort - Kortrijk Kinepolis XPO - Lille Europe - Lens Gare	4/week	
Flixbus	810	Amsterdam Sloterdijk - Brussels Noord	8-17/day	
Flixbus	813	Amsterdam Sloterdijk - Den Haag (The Hague) Centraal/Delft - Rotterdam Centraal - Rotterdam Zuidplein - Breda Prinsenbeek - Antwerp Koningin Astridplein - Brussels Airport Zaventem - Brussels Noord	10/week	Some services are not calling at Rotterdam Centraal, Rotterdam Zuidplein, Breda Prinsenbeek and Brussels Airport Zaventem
Flixbus	814	Amsterdam Sloterdijk - Rotterdam Centraal - Antwerp Koningin Astridplein - Gent Dampoort - Lille Europe - London Victoria Coach Station	1-2/day	Some services are not calling at Rotterdam Centraal, Antwerp Koningin Astridplein and Gent Dampoort
Flixbus	818	Amsterdam Sloterdijk - Schiphol Airport Plaza - Rotterdam Centraal - Rotterdam Zuidplein - Brussels Airport Zaventem - Brussels Noord - Charleroi Sud	2/day	
Flixbus	819	Amsterdam Sloterdijk - Schiphol Airport Plaza - Rotterdam Centraal - Rotterdam Zuidplein - Brussels Airport Zaventem - Brussels Noord - Brugge Bargeplein	1-2/day	Some services terminate at Brussels Noord
Flixbus	831	Amsterdam Sloterdijk - Eindhoven John F. Kennedylaan - Maastricht - Liège Gare de Guillemins - Luxembourg Gare	5/week	
Flixbus	833	Amsterdam Sloterdijk - Eindhoven John F. Kennedylaan - Roermond Shopping Centre - Maastricht - Aachen Westbahnhof	11/week	
Flixbus	1924	Amsterdam Sloterdijk - Den Haag (The Hague) Centraal - Rotterdam Centraal - Breda Centraal - Eindhoven John F. Kennedylaan - Mönchengladbach Hbf - Düsseldorf ZOB am Hbf - Köln Flughafen CGN (Terminal 2) - Frankfurt (Main) Hbf - Aschaffenburg Hbf - Würzburg Hbf - Erlangen Bahnhof - Regensburg Hbf - Passau Hbf - Arad Autogara Pletl - Lipova Pension Mara - Deva Centrală - Orastie Zona Micro 2 - Sebeş, Sibiu Stada Europa Unita - Făgăraş - Braşoc Bartolomeu- Sinaia - Ploieştia - Bucharest Autogara Militari	2/week	
Flixbus	N20	Amsterdam Sloterdijk - Duisburg Hbf - Düsseldorf ZOB am Hbf - Leverkussen Mitte - Bergisch Gladbach Refrath - Siegen Koblenzer Straße - Gießen Mathematikum - Chemnitz Hbf - Dresden Hbf - Wroclaw Busbahnhof - Kotowice - Kraków	1/day	Night bus
Flixbus	N31	Amsterdam Sloterdijk - Den Haag (The Hague) Centraal - Delft - Rotterdam Centraal - Utrecht Centraal - Amersfoort - Apeldoorn - Deventer Carpoolplaats A1* - Hannover ZOB - Berlin Wannsee - Berlin ZOB	4/week	Night bus
Flixbus	N44	Amsterdam Sloterdijk - Groningen - Leer ZOB* - Uplengen Autohof Apen-Remels* - Oldenburg Hbf/ZOB - Bremen ZOB - Hamburg ZOB am Hbf - Berlin Alt-Tegel - Berlin ZOB - Berlin Zoo - Berlin Alexanderplatz	1/day	Night bus
Flixbus	N61	Amsterdam Sloterdijk - Isselburg Autohof* - Duisburg Hbf - Düsseldorf ZOB am Hbf - Köln Flughafen CGN (Terminal 2) - Frankfurt (Main) Flughafen Terminal 2 - Frankfurt (Main) Hbf - Würzburg Hbf - Erlangen Bahnhof - Nürnberg ZOB - Regensburg Hbf - Deggendorf Bahnhof - Passau Hbf - Vienna International Busterminal	2-5/day	Night bus; Some services terminate at Köln Flughafen CGN (Terminal 2); Some services are not calling at Duisburg Hbf, Frankfurt (Main) Flughafen Terminal 2, Würzburg Hbf, Erlangen Bahnhof and Deggendorf Bahnhof; On most services the request stop Isselburg Autohof is not available
Flixbus	N67	Schiphol Airport Plaza - Amsterdam Sloterdijk - Osnabrüch Hbf - Bad Oeynhausen ZOB - Hannover ZOB - Hildesheim ZOB - Salzgitter Rathaus Lebenstadt - Braunschweig Hbf - Magdeburg ZOB - Halle (Saale) Hbf - Leipzig Hbf - Dresden Hbf - Prague Busbahnhof ÚAN Florenc	2/day	Night bus; 1/day service runs from/to Schiphol Airport Plaza; 1/day service runs from/to Amsterdam Sloterdijk; Some services are not calling at Osnabrück Hbf, Bad Oeynhausen ZOB, Hildesheim ZOB, Salzgitter Rathaus Lebenstadt, Braunschweig Hbf, Magdeburg ZOB and Halle (Saale) Hbf
Flixbus	N75	Amsterdam Sloterdijk - Groningen - Bremen Hbf - Hamburg ZOB am Hbf - Berlin ZOB	1/day	Night bus
Flixbus	N93	Amsterdam Sloterdijk - Schiphol Airport Plaza - Den Haag (The Hague) Centraal - Rotterdam Centraal - Eindhoven John F. Kennedylaan - Heerlen Spoorsingel - Aachen Westbahnhof - Köln Flughafen CGN (Terminal 2) - Bonn Museumsmeile - Koblenz Hbf - Karlsruhe Hbf - Stuttgart Flughafen/Messe - Ulm Eberhard-Finckh Straße - Augsburg P+R Augsburg Nord - München Hacherbrücke/ZOB	0-1/day	Night bus
Flixbus	N94	Amsterdam Sloterdijk - Utrecht Centraal - Nijmegen Tunnelweg - Mönchengladbach Hbf - Mannheim ZOB am Hbf - Heidelberg Hbf - Karlsruhe Hbf - Stuttgart Flughafen/Messe - München Hackerbrücke/ZOB	1/day	Night bus
Flixbus	N116	Amsterdam Sloterdijk - Schiphol Airport Plaza - Rotterdam Centraal - Rotterdam Zuidplein - Eindhoven John F. Kennedylaan - Venlo - Duisburg Hbf - Essen Hbf - Bochum Hbf - Dortmund ZOB am Hbf - Siegen Koblenzer Straße - Frankfurt (Main) Hbf - Frankfurt (Main) Flughafen Terminal 2 - Mainz Hbf - Wiesbaden Hbf	5/week	Night bus
Flixbus	N760	Amsterdam Sloterdijk - Rotterdam Centraal - Antwerp Koningin Astridplein - Louvain-la-Neuve Porte Lemaître - Namur Gare - Langres Parking Péage A31 - Dijon-Ville - Beaunne Avenua Charles de Gaulle - Chalon-sur-Saône Routière - Lyon Perrache - Lyon Aéroport Saint Exupéry	6/week	Night bus; 2/week service between Dijon-Ville and Lyon Aéroport Saint Exupéry; 4/week service between Amsterdam Sloterdijk and Lyon Aéroport Saint Exupéry
Flixbus	N800	Amsterdam Sloterdijk - Schiphol Airport Plaza - Amsterdam Hoogoorddreef/Atlas - Utrecht Centraal - Breda Centraal - Antwerp Koningin Astridplein - Brussels Airport Zaventem - Brussels Noord - Lille Europe - Paris Charles de Gaulle (Terminal 3) - Peris Bercy Seine - Créteil Centre Université - Aéroport Orly Sud (P6)	1-2/day	Night bus; Some services are not calling at Schiphol Airport Plaza, Utrecht Centraal, Breda Centraal, Antwerp Koningin Astridplein, Brussels Airport Zaventem, Brussels Noord, Lille Europe and Paris Charles de Gaulle (Terminal 3)
Flixbus	N802	(Alkmaar - Amsterdam Sloterdijk - Schiphol Airport Plaza - Amsterdam Hoogoorddreef/Atlas - Utrecht Centraal - Antwerp Koningin Astridplein - Gent Dampoort) / (Amsterdam Sloterdijk - Den Haag (The Hague) Centraal - Delft - Rotterdam Centraal - Rotterdam Zuidplein - Brussels Noord - Paris Charles de Gaulle) - Paris Bercy Seine	1-2/day	Night bus
Flixbus	N803	Amsterdam Sloterdijk - Schiphol Airport Plaza - Den Haag (The Hague) Centraal - Rotterdam Centraal - Brussels Airport Zaventem - Brussels Noord - Brussels Zuid - Lille Europe - Paris Charles de Gaulle (Terminal 3) - Paris Bercy Seine	1/dag	Night bus
Flixbus	N814	Amsterdam Sloterdijk - Den Haag (The Hague) Centraal - Rotterdam Centraal - Gent Dampoort - Lille Europe - London Victoria Coach Station	1/day	Night bus
Flixbus	N818	Charleroi Sud - Brussels Noord - Brussels Airport Zaventem - Rotterdam Centraal - Schiphol Airport Plaza - Amsterdam Sloterdijk - Groningen - Bremen hbf - Hamburg ZOB am Hbf	1/day	Night bus
Flixbus	N819	Amsterdam Sloterdijk - Schiphol Airport Plaza - Den Haag (The Hague) Centraal - Rotterdam Centraal - Rotterdam Zuidplein - Antwerp Koningin Astridplein - Brussels Airport Zaventem - Brussels Zuid - Bruggge Bargeplein	1/day	Night bus
Flixbus	N831	Amsterdam Sloterdijk - Eindhoven John F. Kennedylaan - Maastricht - Liège Gare de Guillemins - Bastogne Gare du Sud* - Arlon Parc des Expositions* - Luxembourg Gare - Cormar Gare SNCF - Saint-Louis Euro/Airport Basel Mulhouse Freiburg - Basel SBB - Zürich Bus-Parkplatz Sihlquai	4/week	Night bus
Flixbus	N836	Amsterdam Sloterdijk - Brussels Noord - Luxembourg P+R Bouillion - Metz Gare Routiere - Nancy Quai Sainte-Catherine - Basel SBB - Luzem Bahnhof - Milan Lampugnano	1/day	Night bus
Flixbus	N844	Rotterdam Centraal - Den Haag (The Hague) Centraal - Schiphol Airport Plaza - Amsterdam Sloterdijk - Hamburg ZOB am Hbf - Kolding Rutebilsation - Odense Dannebrogsgabe - Kopenhagen Ingerslevsgade	4/week	Night bus
Flixbus	X31	Amsterdam Sloterdijk - Berlin ZOB	1-2/day	
Flixbus	X68	Amsterdam Sloterdijk - Frankfurt (Main) Hbf - (Darmstadt Hbf - Mannheim ZOB am Hbf - Heidelberg Hbf) / (Nürnberg ZOB - Prague Busbahnhof ÚAN Frolenc)	1-2/day	

* = Requested stop

== Gallery ==
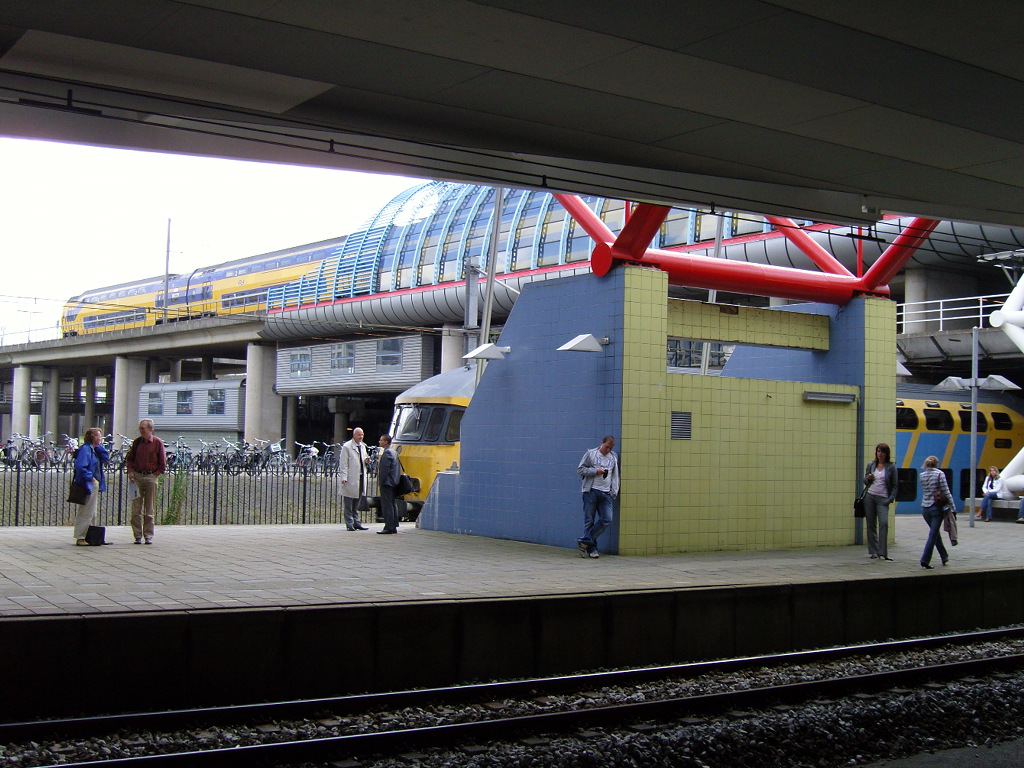
Railways on two levels

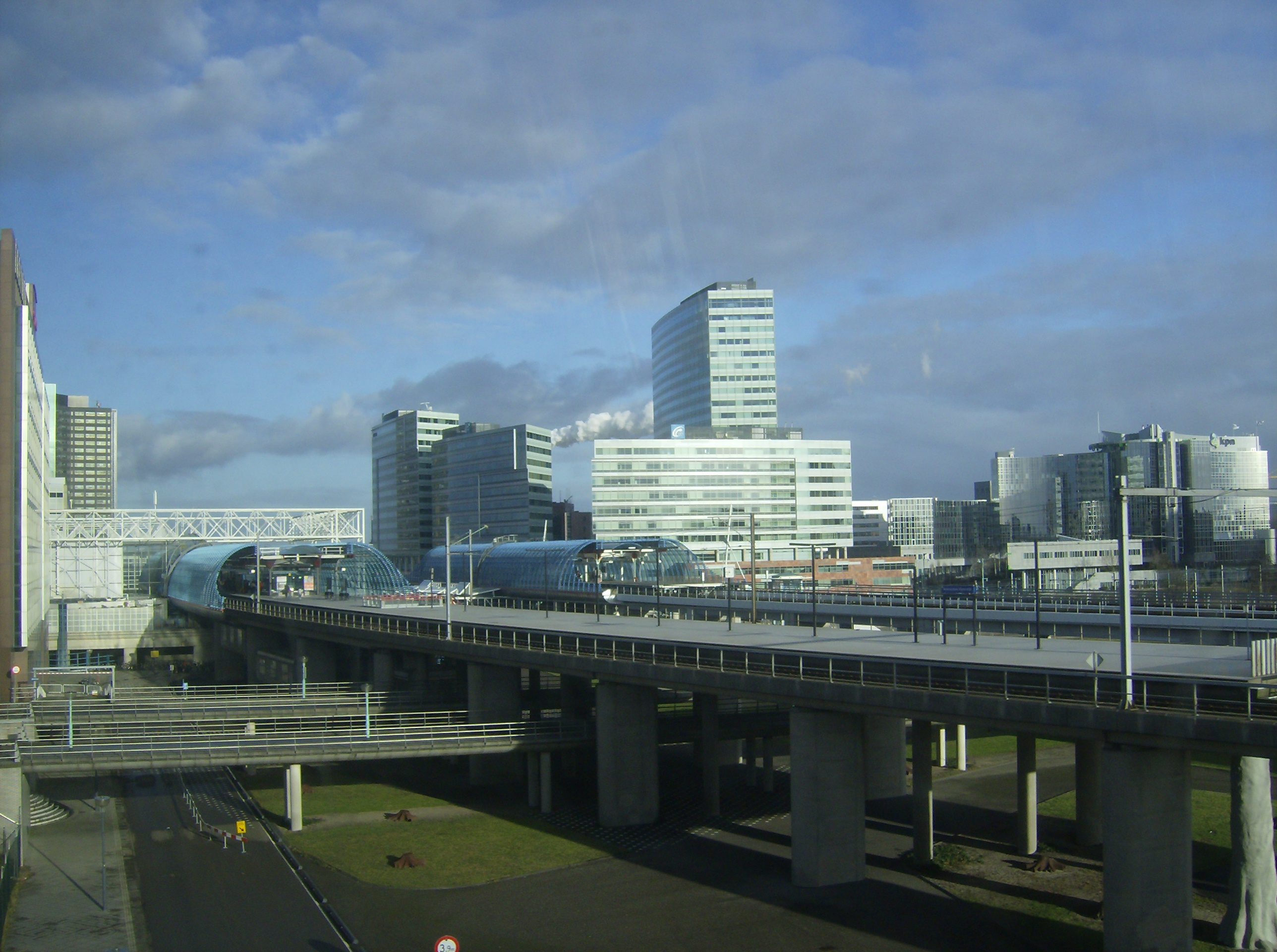
Amsterdam Sloterdijk from the Hemboog

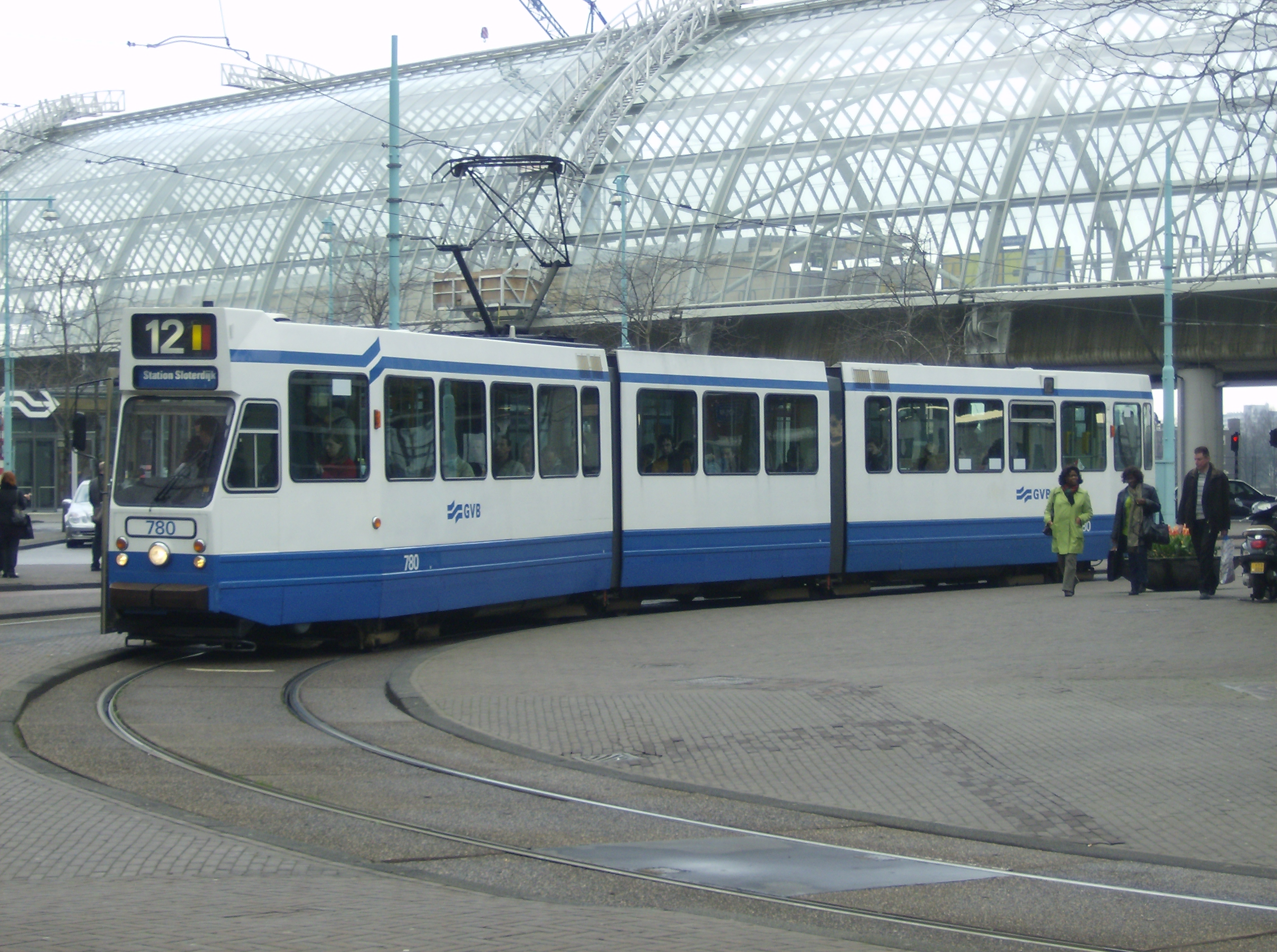
Tram at the former tram stop

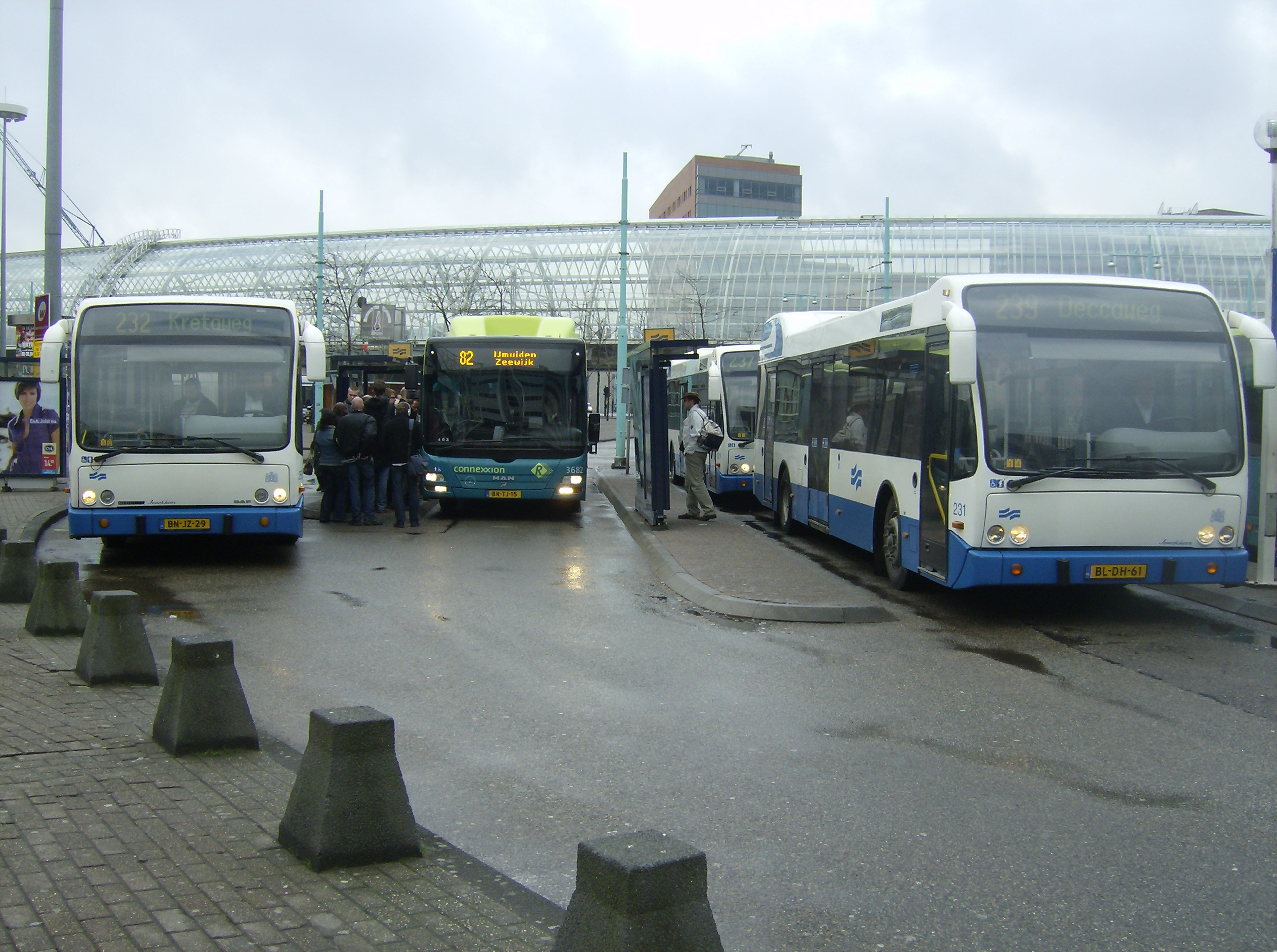
A mix of regional and city buses in the Evening Peak at the former Bus Station

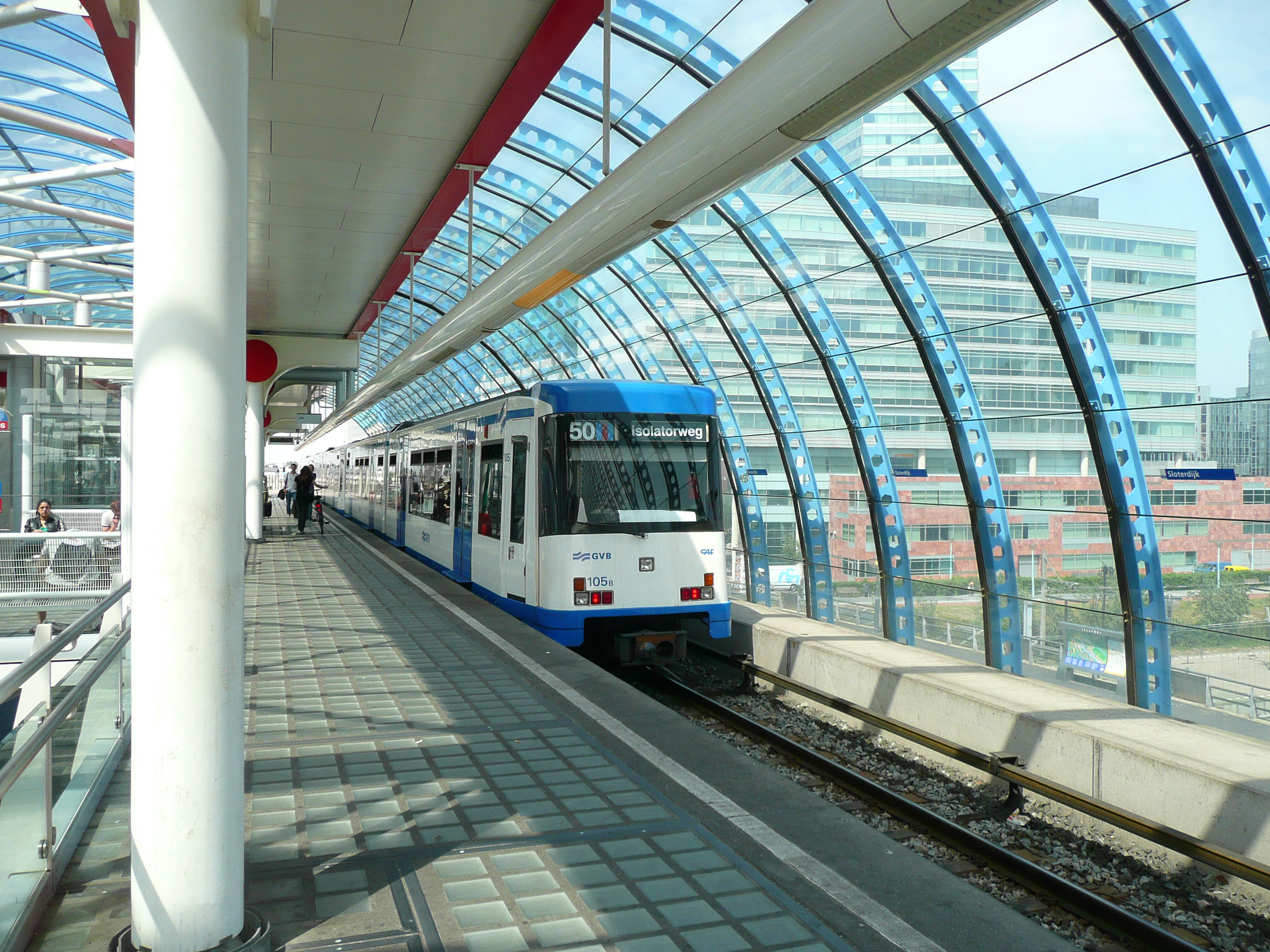
A Metro on line 50 at Sloterdijk

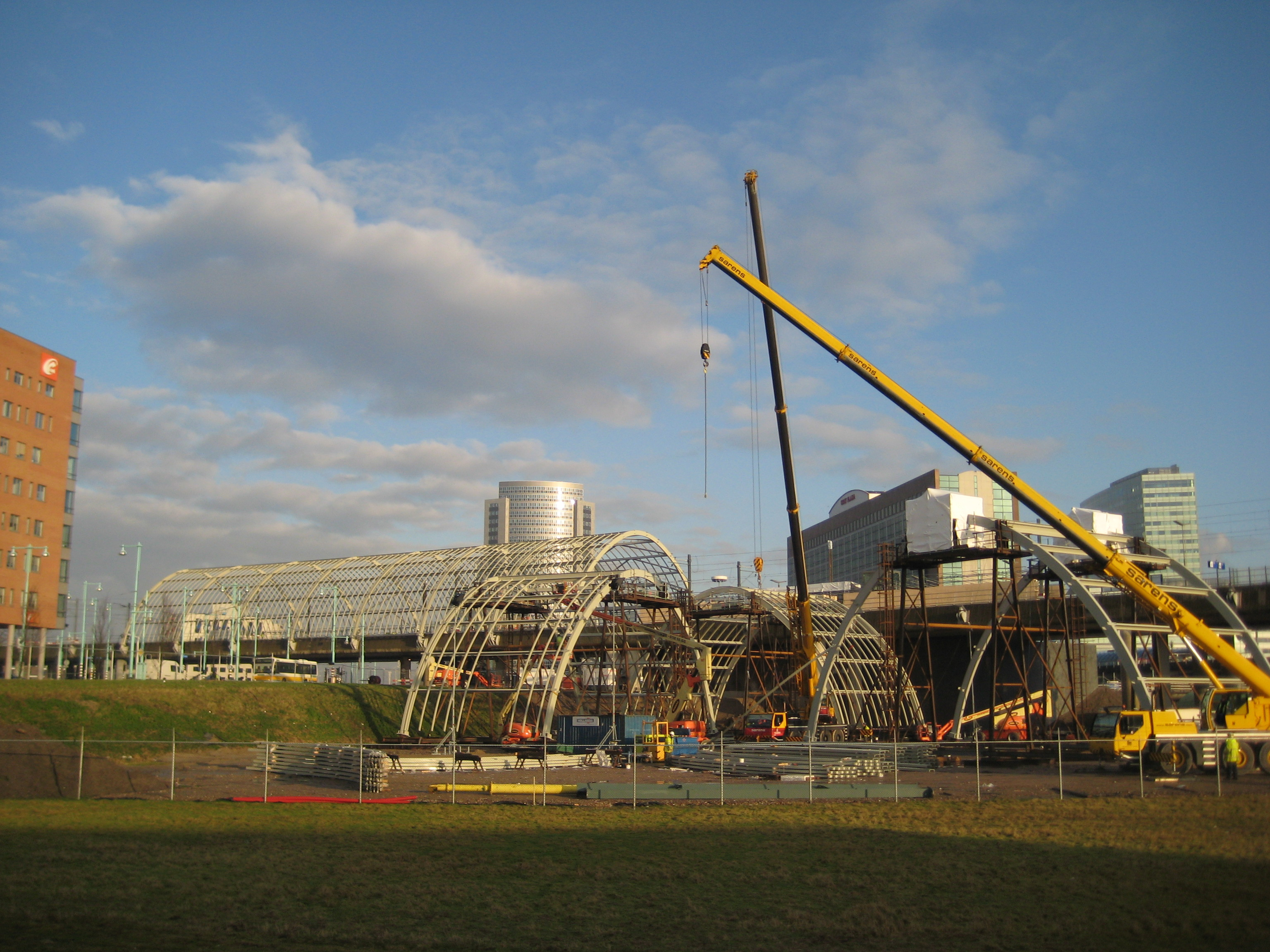
Construction of the platform on the Hemboog chord, December 2008

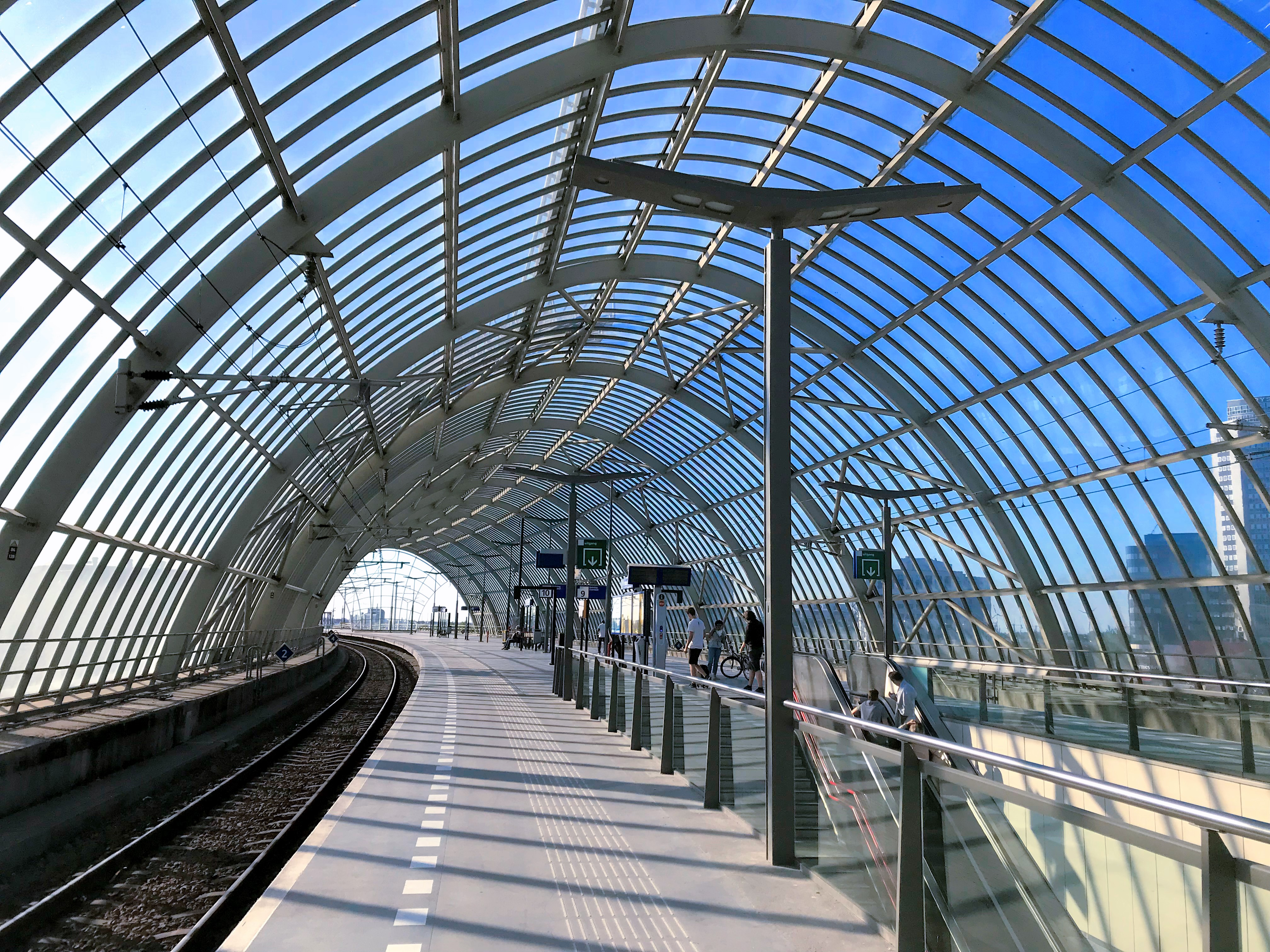
Platform 9 and 10

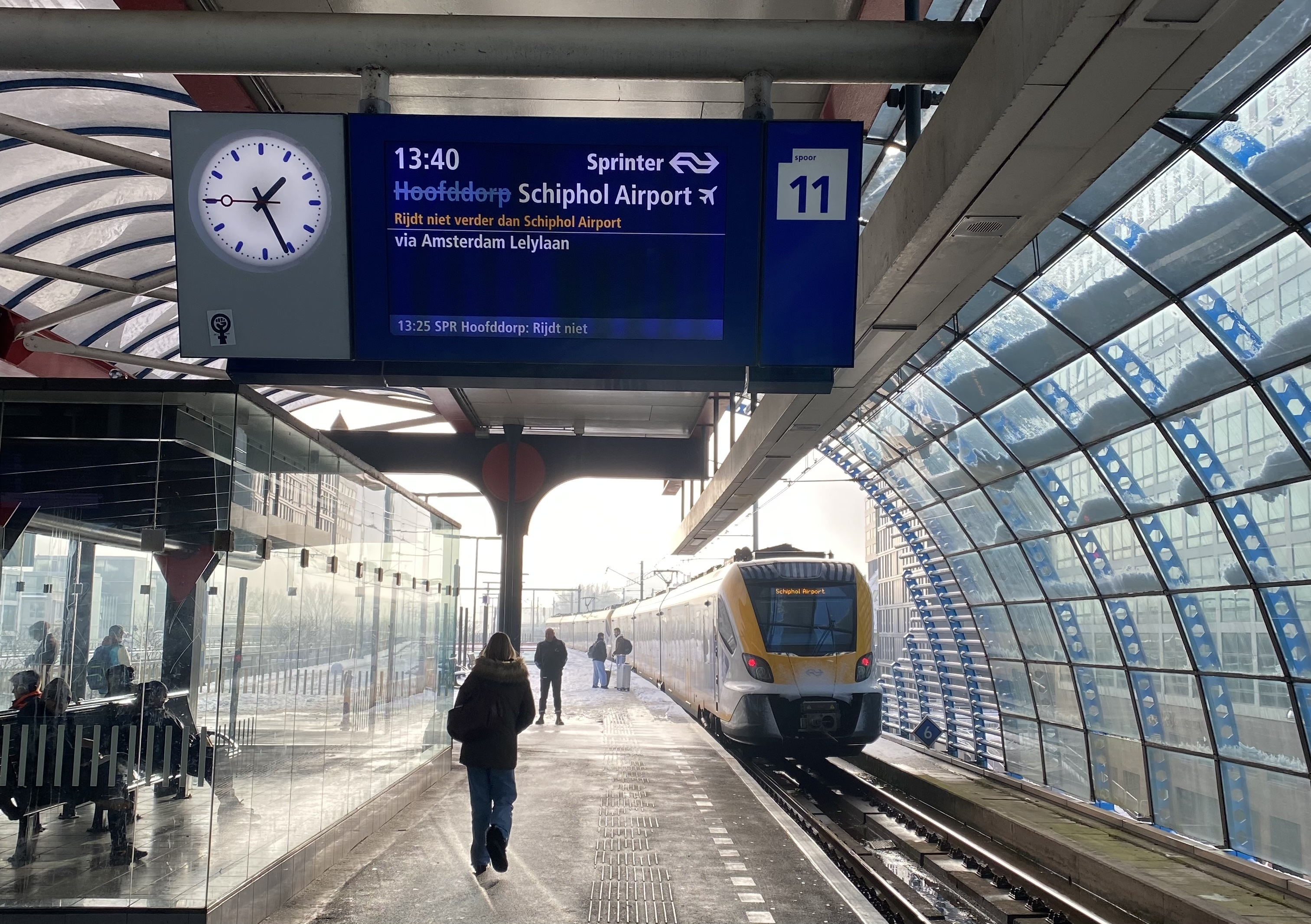
A Sprinter service to Schiphol Airport held at platform 11 due to adverse weather
