= Bovenkarspel-Grootebroek railway station =

Railway station in the Netherlands

Bovenkarspel-Grootebroek
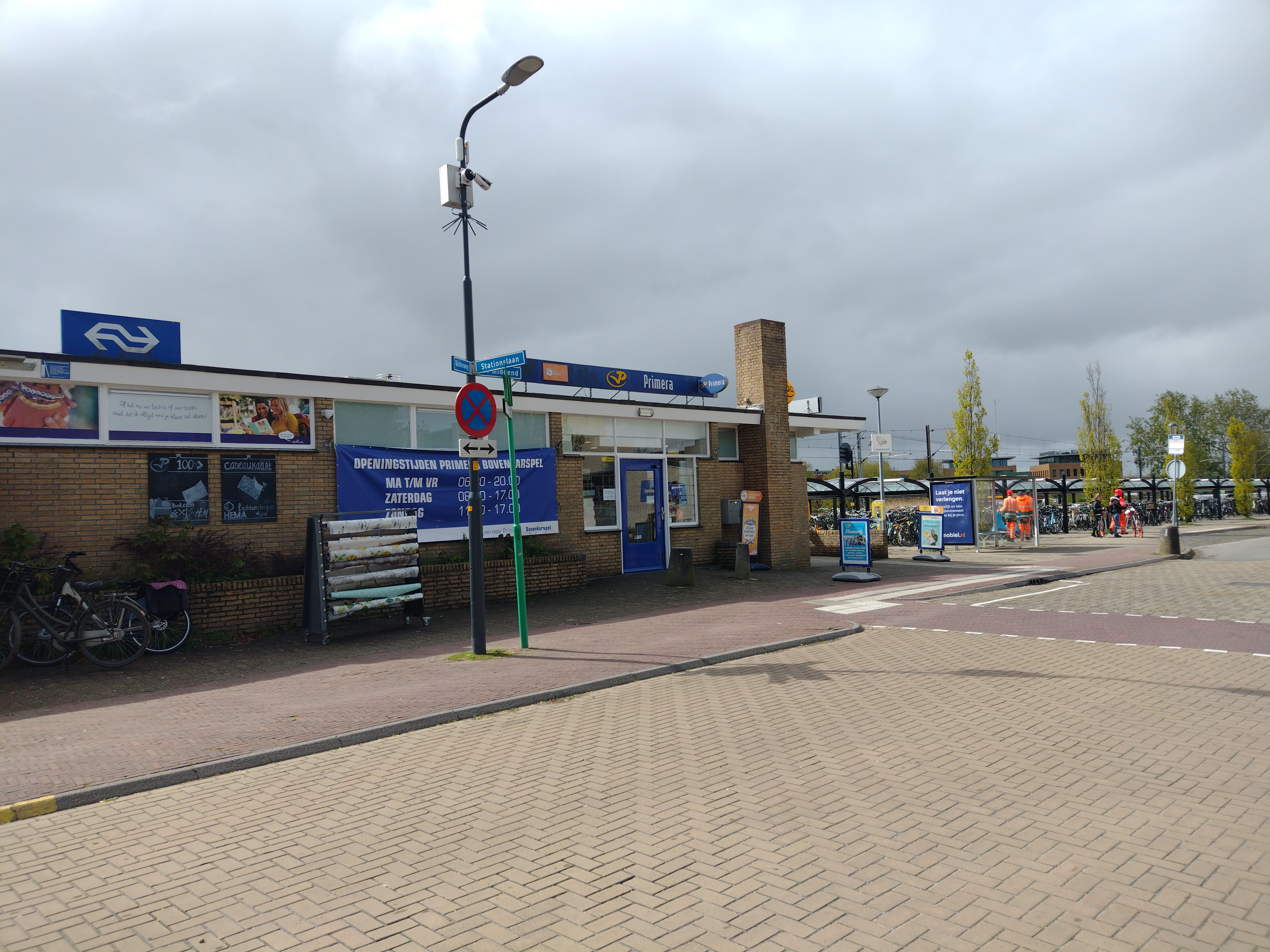

General information
- Location: Netherlands
- Coordinates: 52°41′42″N 5°14′10″E
- Line: Zaandam–Enkhuizen railway

History
- Opened: 6 June 1885, 1965 (current building)

Services
Preceding station	Nederlandse Spoorwegen	Following station
Hoogkarspel towards Maastricht	NS Intercity 2900 After 19:00 and Fri-Sun only	Bovenkarspel Flora towards Enkhuizen
Hoogkarspel towards Amsterdam Centraal	NS Intercity 3700 Mon-Thur Peak Only	Bovenkarspel Flora towards Enkhuizen
Hoogkarspel towards Heerlen	NS Intercity 3900 Mon-Thur until 19:30	Bovenkarspel Flora towards Enkhuizen
Location
- Location within Netherlands

Bovenkarspel-Grootebroek is a railway station in Bovenkarspel, Netherlands. It services a large portion of the population of the municipality of Stede Broec.

== Location ==
The station is centrally located along the border of the towns of Bovenkarspel and Grootebroek, hence the name of the station. The station is situated within the commercial district of the municipality. It is one of the two railway stations in Bovenkarspel, the other being Bovenkarspel-Flora. Located in a commuter town, it services commuters to and from cities such as Enkhuizen, Hoorn, and Amsterdam on the Zaandam-Enkhuizen railway.

== History ==
The original station opened on 6 June 1885 on the Zaandam–Enkhuizen railway. It serviced the town and the neighbouring action building.

In 1965, the old station building was demolished and replaced with the current station. The current station has a functionalist modern look and services the commuting population of the area. It has an island platform which can be accessed through a level crossing.

The station and services are operated by Nederlandse Spoorwegen.

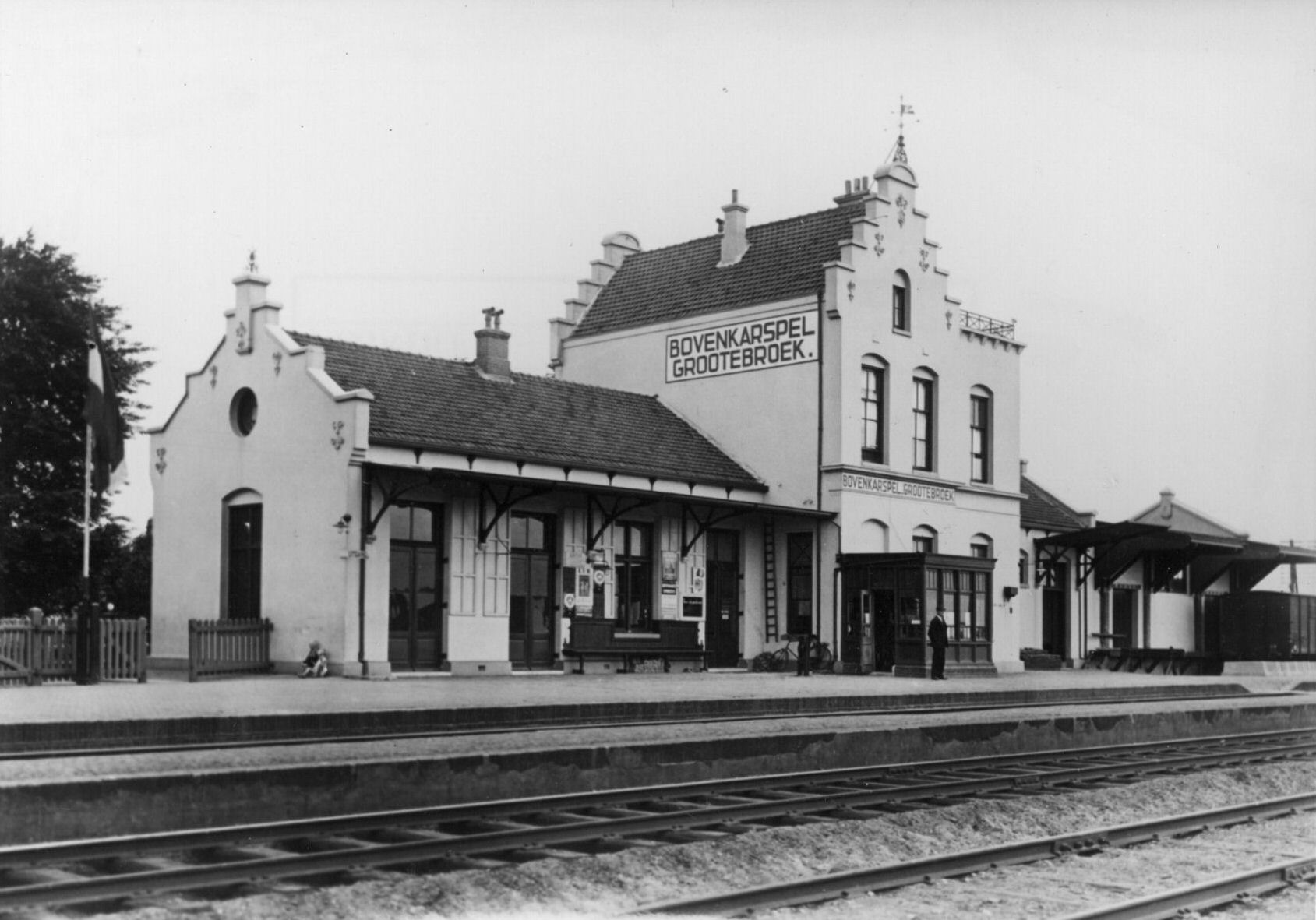
Old station of Bovenkarspel-Grootebroek

== Train services ==
The following services currently call at Bovenkarspel-Grootebroek:

Service	Type	Route (most prominent stations)	Details
2900	Intercity(NS)	Enkhuizen – Bovenkarspel-Grootebroek – Hoorn – Amsterdam Centraal – Utrecht Centraal – 's-Hertogenbosch – Eindhoven Centraal – Weert – Roermond – Sittard – Maastricht	Does not stop at Zaandam.
3900	Intercity (NS)	Enkhuizen – Bovenkarspel-Grootebroek – Hoorn – Amsterdam Centraal – Utrecht Centraal – 's-Hertogenbosch – Eindhoven Centraal – Weert – Roermond – Sittard – Heerlen	Does not stop at Zaandam.
3700	Intercity (NS)	Amsterdam Centraal – Purmerend – Hoorn – Bovenkarspel-Grootebroek – Enkhuizen	Does not stop at Zaandam. Only travels during rush hour, does not travel on Fridays.
12900	Intercity (NS)	Enkhuizen – Bovenkarspel-Grootebroek – Hoorn – Amsterdam Centraal	Does not stop at Zaandam. Only travels on early Saturday mornings, then continues onward as an intercity to Nijmegen from Amsterdam Centraal.

== Bus services ==
Line	Route
Connexxion
138	Enkhuizen NS–Town Centre–Enkhuizen Noord (Flosbeugel)–Bovenkarspel–Grootebroek–Lutjebroek–Hoogkarspel–Venhuizen (- Hem)
412	Bovenkarspel-Grootebroek NS–Venhuizen–Hem–Widenes–Schellinkhout (Nature Reserve)–Schellinkhout–Hoorn NS

== Images ==
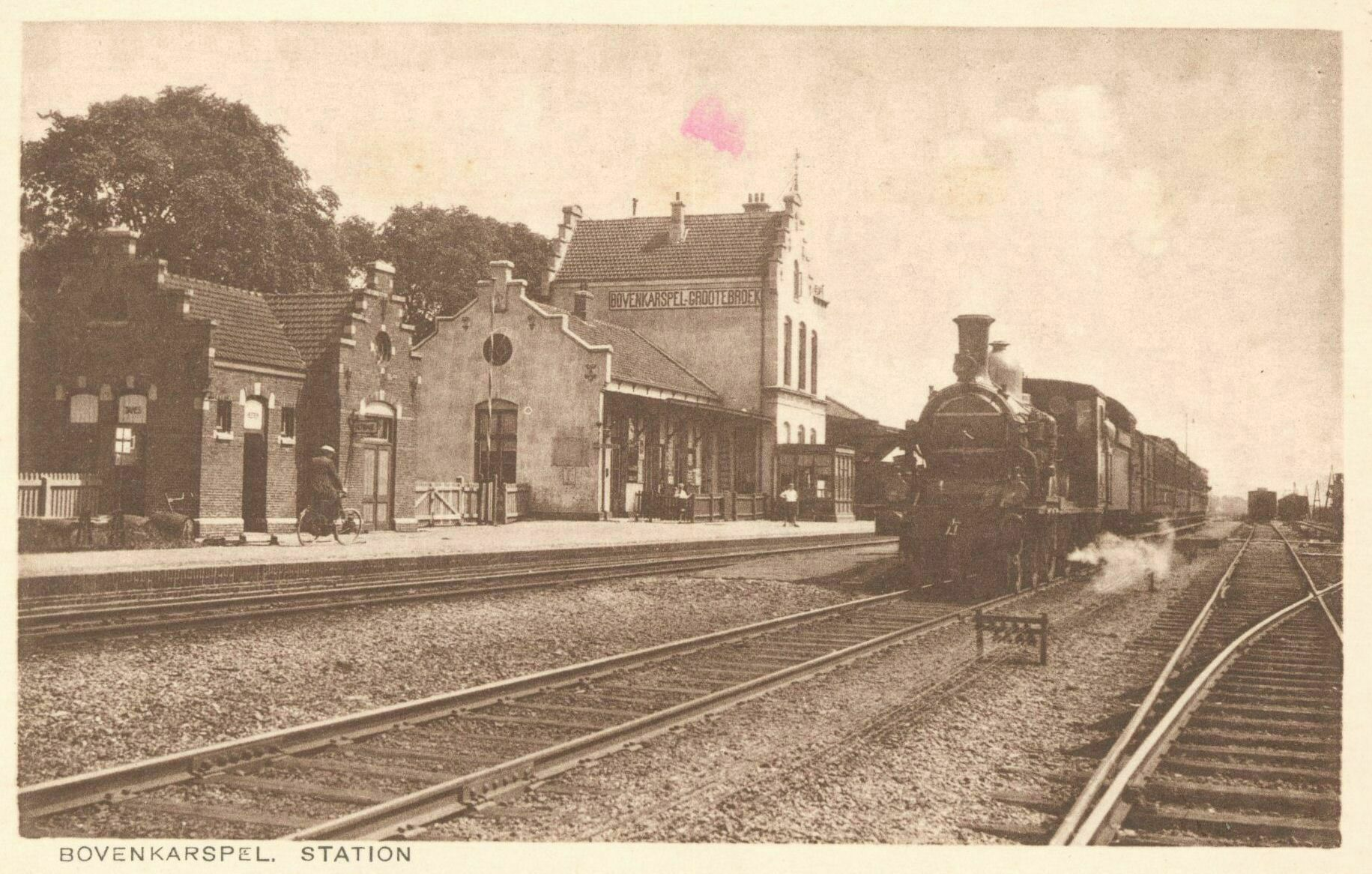
Steam locomotive at the old station

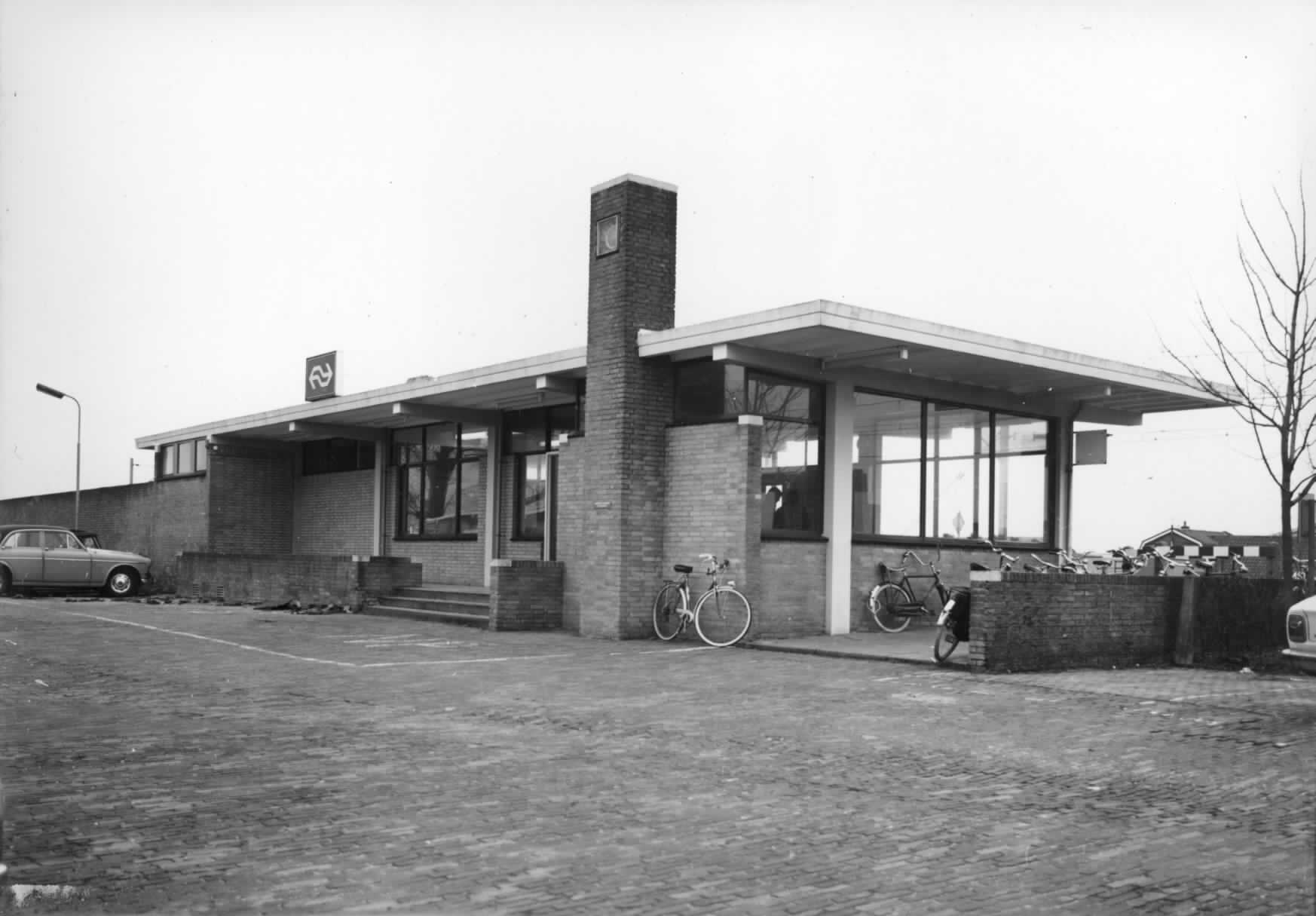
Station in 1975

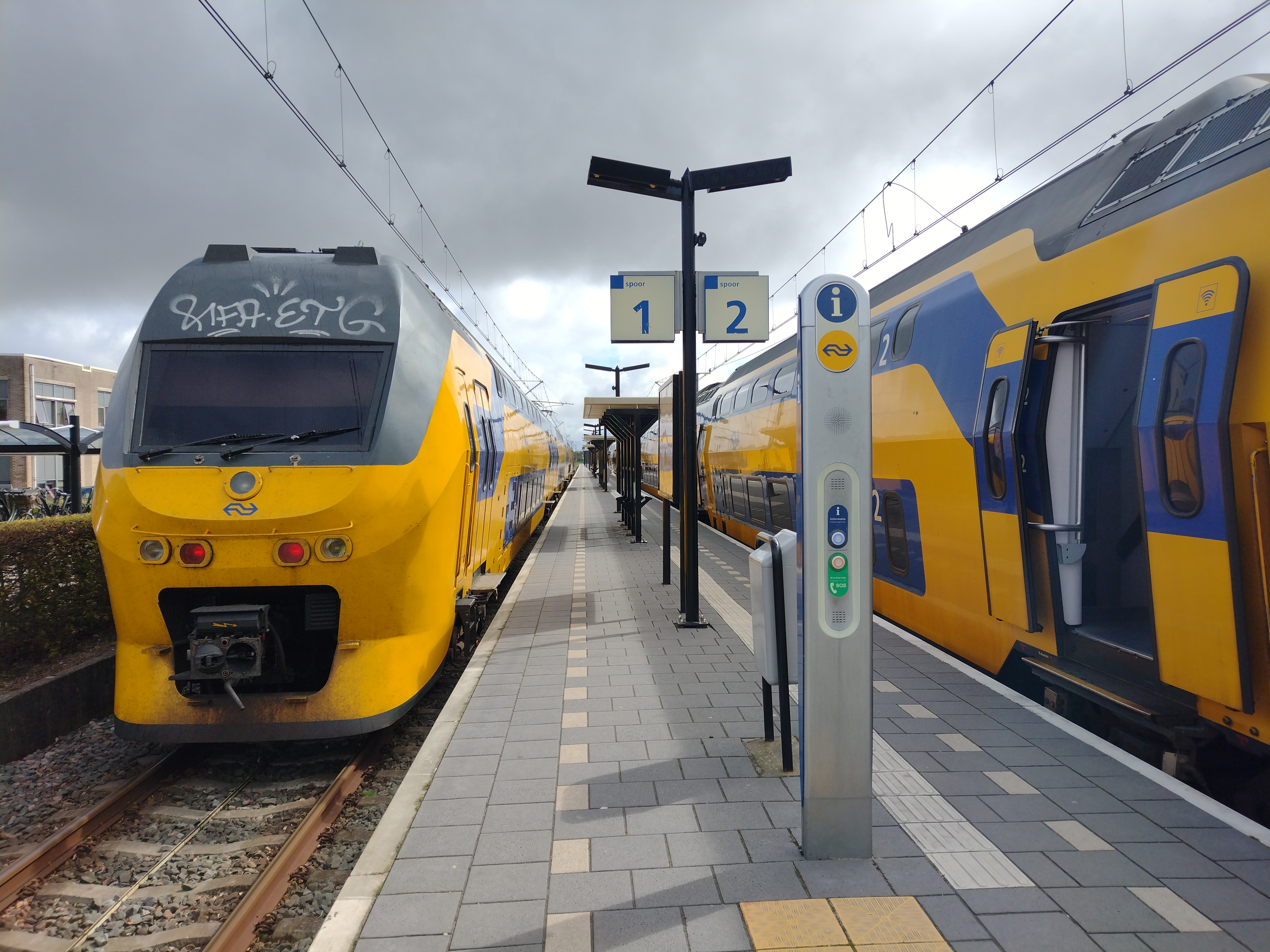
Two VIRM trains at the platform
