= Purmerend Weidevenne railway station =

Railway station in the Netherlands

Purmerend Weidevenne
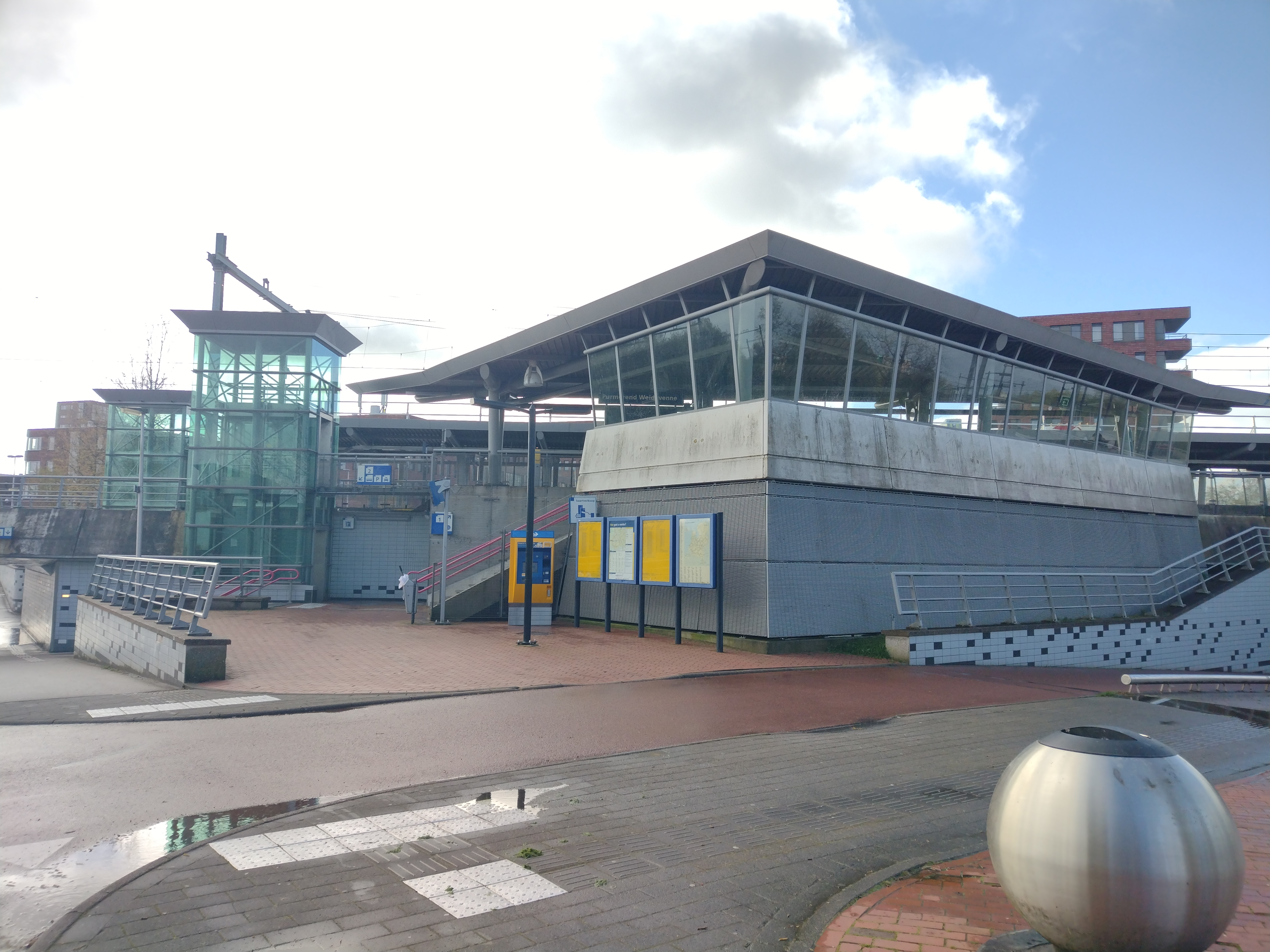
- Weidevenne train station in 2024

General information
- Location: Netherlands
- Coordinates: 52°29′48″N 4°56′12″E
- Line: Zaandam–Enkhuizen railway
- Platforms: 2
- Tracks: 2

History
- Opened: December 2007

Services
Preceding station	Nederlandse Spoorwegen	Following station
Zaandam Kogerveld towards Hoofddorp	NS Sprinter 4100	Purmerend towards Hoorn Kersenboogerd
Location
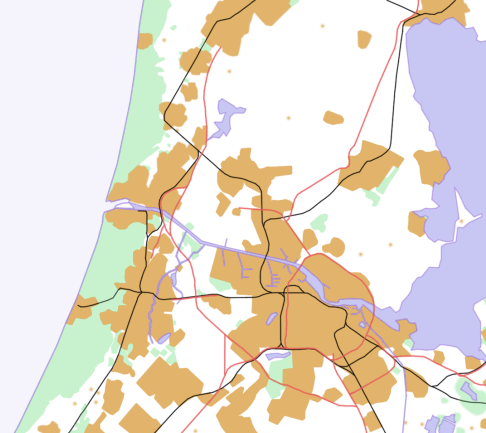
- Location within Northern Randstad Location within Netherlands

Purmerend Weidevenne is a suburban railway station, in the Weidevenne estate in Purmerend, Netherlands. The station opened on 9 December 2007 and is on the Zaandam–Enkhuizen railway. The official opening of the station was on 8 December 2007.

== Train services ==
The following train services currently call at Purmerend Weidevenne:

- 2x per hour local service (sprinter) Hoofddorp - Schiphol - Zaandam - Hoorn Kersenboogerd

In the morning, afternoon and early evening the train starts in Leiden before continuing to Hoofddorp and further.

From December 2008, the direct connection with Amsterdam Centraal was lost, due to the Stoptrain 4500 becoming an Intercity, not stopping between Amsterdam Sloterdijk and Hoorn. Therefore, it is recommended to travel to Zaandam/Amsterdam Sloterdijk and change for central Amsterdam.

== Gallery ==
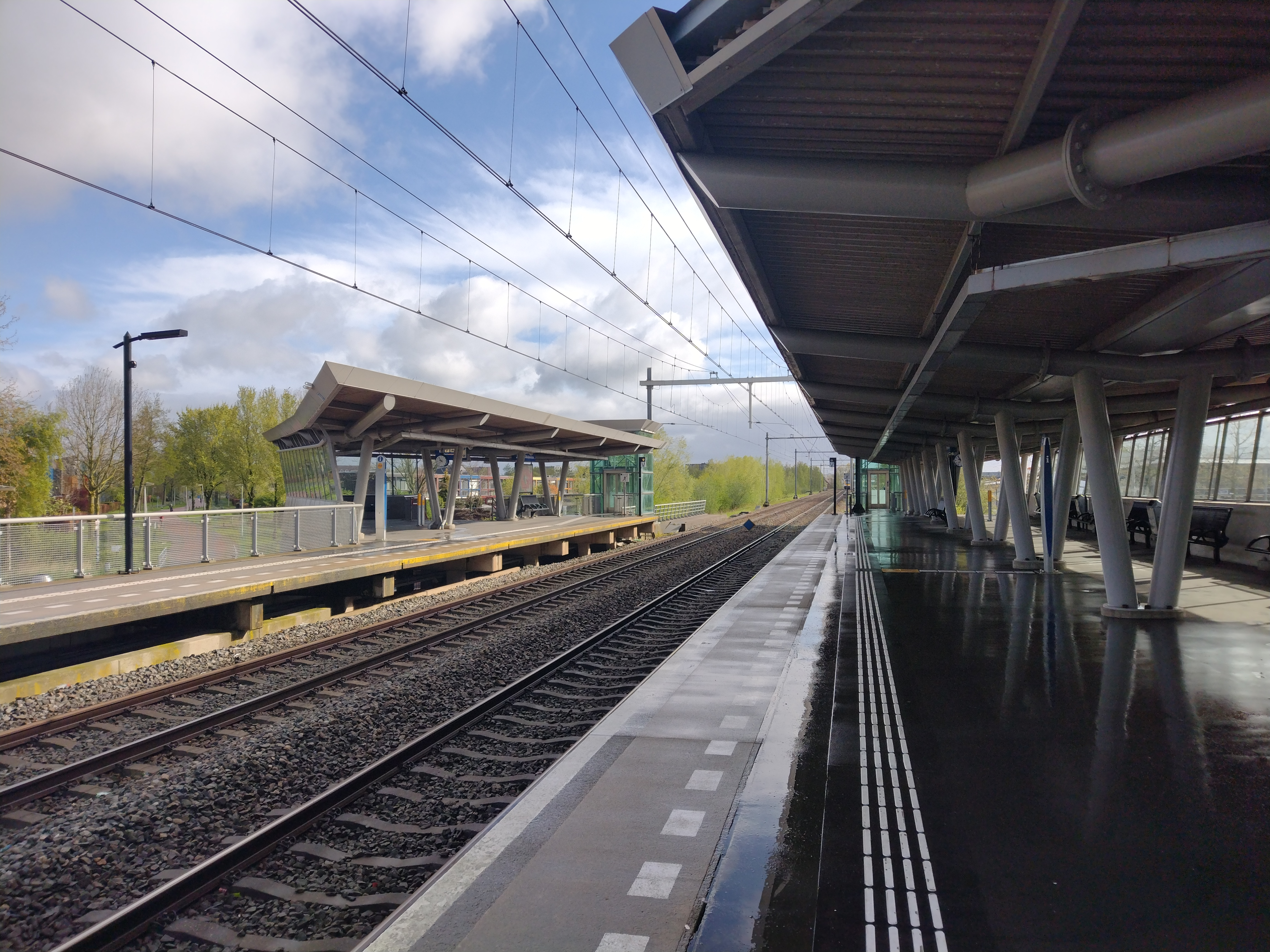
The 2 platforms for the train station

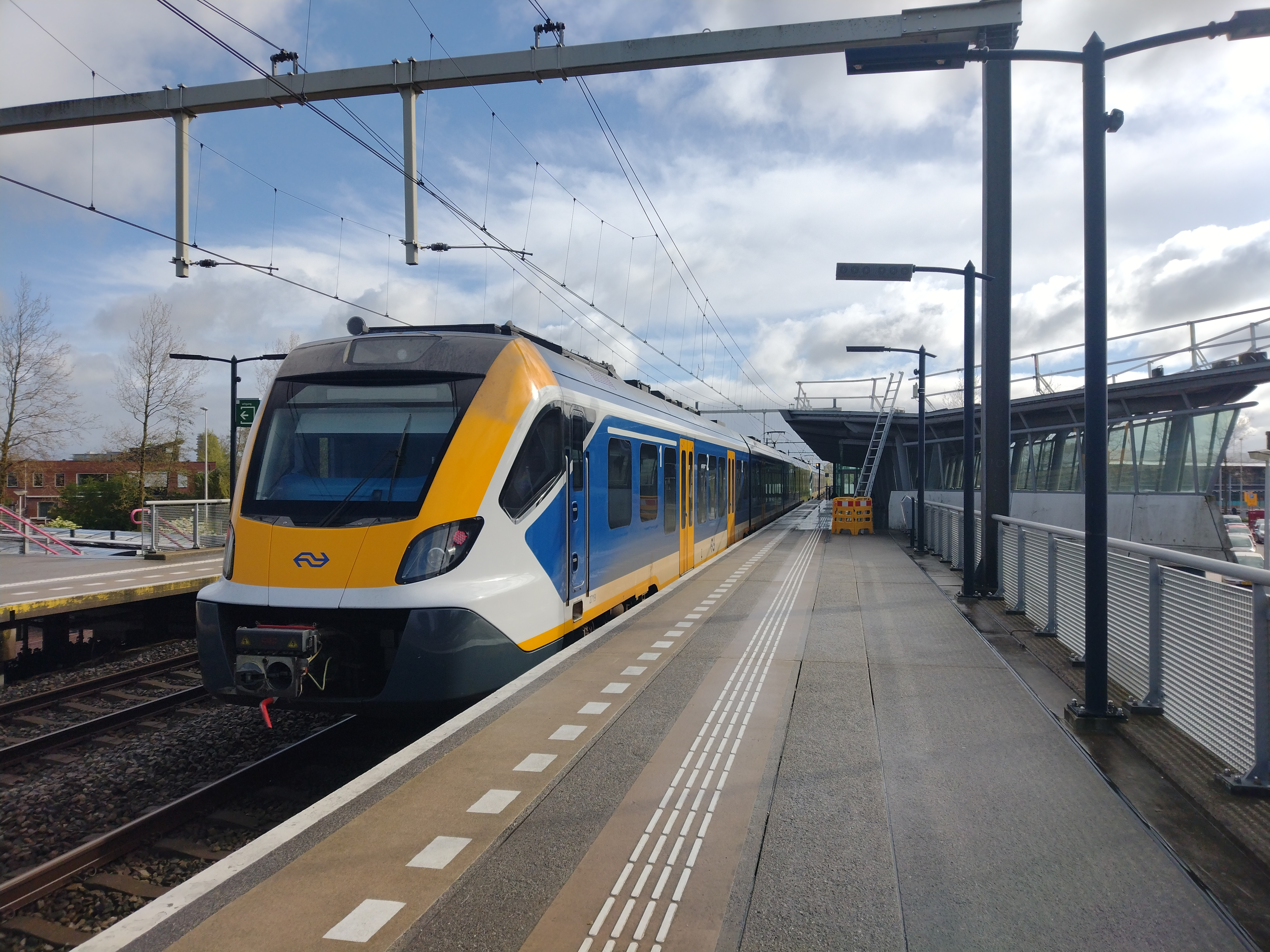
A stopped NS Sprinter bound for Hoorn Kersenboogerd

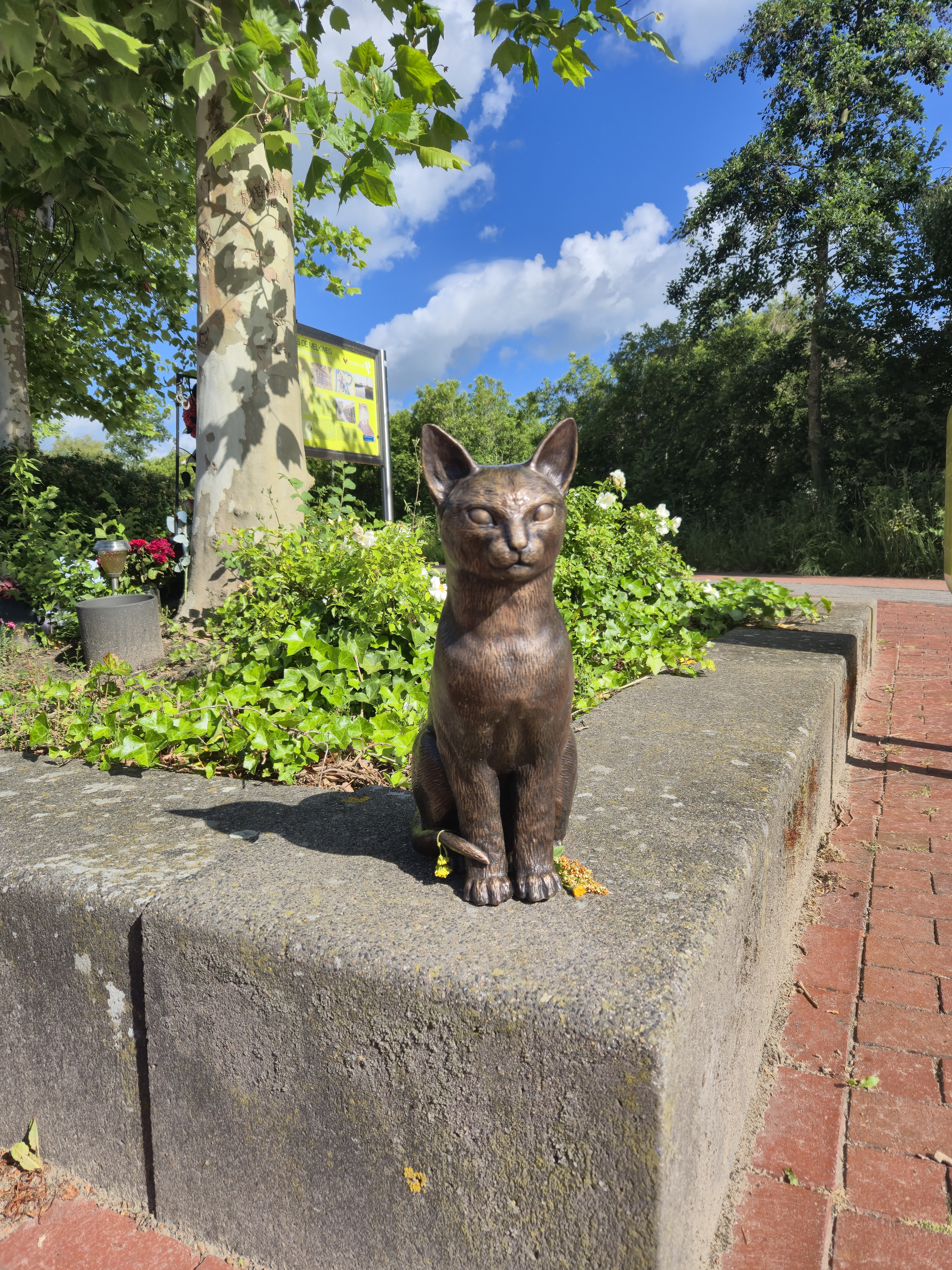
Station cat Bram's bronze statue
