= Hoogkarspel railway station =

Railway station in the Netherlands

Hoogkarspel
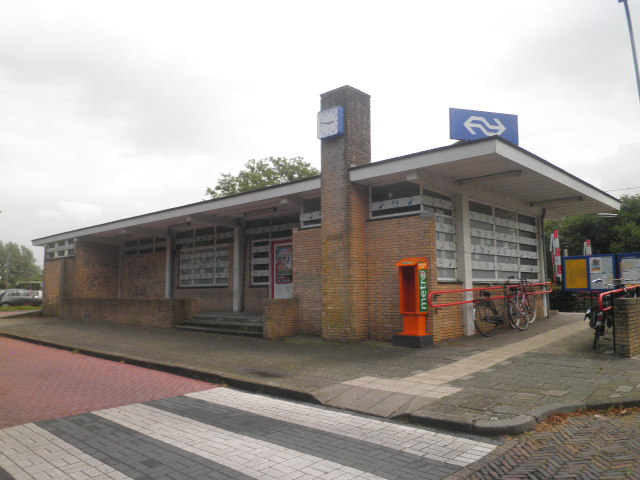

General information
- Location: Netherlands
- Coordinates: 52°41′26″N 5°11′02″E
- Line: Zaandam–Enkhuizen railway

Other information
- Station code: Hks

History
- Opened: 6 June 1885, 1965 (current)

Services
Preceding station	Nederlandse Spoorwegen	Following station
Hoorn Kersenboogerd towards Maastricht	NS Intercity 2900 After 19:00 and Fri-Sun only	Bovenkarspel-Grootebroek towards Enkhuizen
Hoorn Kersenboogerd towards Amsterdam Centraal	NS Intercity 3700 Mon-Thur Peak Only	Bovenkarspel-Grootebroek towards Enkhuizen
Hoorn Kersenboogerd towards Heerlen	NS Intercity 3900 Mon-Thur until 19:30	Bovenkarspel-Grootebroek towards Enkhuizen
Location
- Location within Netherlands

Hoogkarspel is a railway station in Hoogkarspel, Netherlands. The station opened on 6 June 1885 and is located between Hoorn and Enkhuizen. The station is on the Zaandam–Enkhuizen railway. The station and services are operated Nederlandse Spoorwegen. The current station building dates from 1965.

== Train services ==
The following services currently call at Hoogkarspel:

- 2x per hour intercity service Enkhuizen - Hoorn - Amsterdam - Utrecht - 's Hertogenbosch - Eindhoven - Roermond - Heerlen (or Maastricht)
- 2x per hour intercity service Enkhuizen - Hoorn - Amsterdam (peak hours)

== Bus service ==
Line	Route
Connexxion
138	Enkhuizen, Station NS - Town Centre - Enkhuizen Noord (Flosbeugel) - Bovenkarspel - Grootebroek - Lutjebroek - Hoogkarspel - Venhuizen - Hem

All services operate to Hoogkarspel, Julianastraat, which is a short walk from the station along the Julianastraat.
