= Bovenkarspel Flora railway station =

Railway station in the Netherlands

Station Bovenkarspel Flora
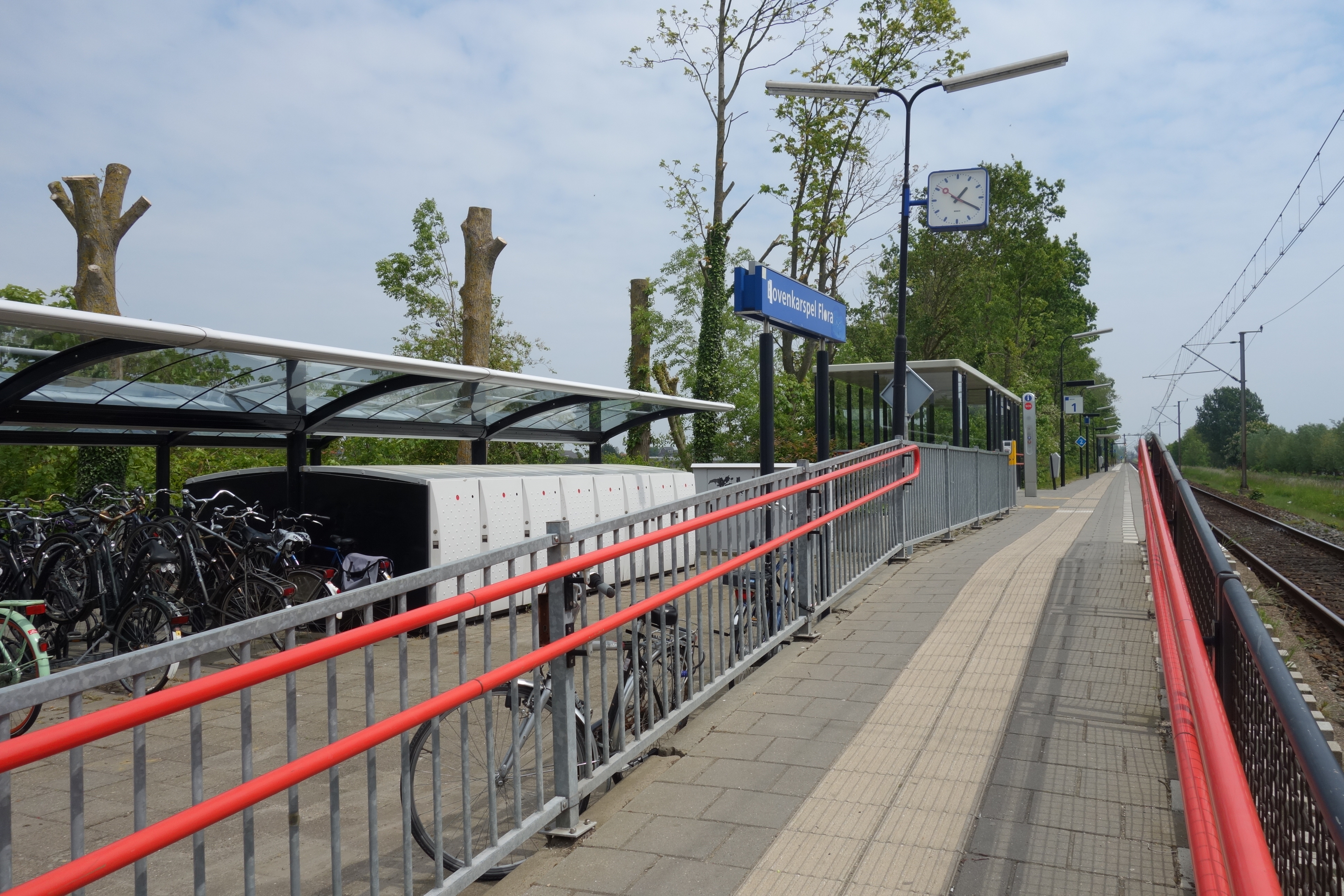

General information
- Location: Netherlands
- Coordinates: 52°41′45″N 5°15′11″E
- Line: Zaandam–Enkhuizen railway

History
- Opened: 1977 (current station)

Services
| Preceding station | Nederlandse Spoorwegen | Following station |
|---|---|---|
| Bovenkarspel-Grootebroek towards Maastricht | NS Intercity 2900 After 19:00 and Fri-Sun only | Enkhuizen Terminus |
| Bovenkarspel-Grootebroek towards Amsterdam Centraal | NS Intercity 3700 Mon-Thur Peak Only | Enkhuizen Terminus |
| Bovenkarspel-Grootebroek towards Heerlen | NS Intercity 3900 Mon-Thur until 19:30 | Enkhuizen Terminus |
Location
- Location within Netherlands

Bovenkarspel Flora is a railway station on the outskirts of Bovenkarspel in the Netherlands. It opened in 1977 and lies on the Zaandam–Enkhuizen railway line, between Hoorn and Enkhuizen. Operated by Nederlandse Spoorwegen (NS), the station was originally intended to serve visitors to the nearby Westfriese Flora garden festival, which is reflected in its name.

== History ==
On June 6, 1885, the Staatsspoorwegen opened a stop called Broekerhaven just east of Bovenkarspel. This stop, like many of its time, featured only a platform without additional facilities. It was closed on May 15, 1938, but saw brief reopenings in 1940 and 1941. After World War II, Nederlandse Spoorwegen introduced a temporary event stop named Floraweg at the same location, which operated exclusively during the annual Westfriese Flora garden festival. In 1976, NS reinstated the stop into the regular timetable, adding a simple shelter. A year later, in 1977, the stop was renamed Bovenkarspel Flora. In the mid-1980s, a small structure was placed for ticket sales, but it was removed a few years later.

== Train services ==
The following services currently call at Bovenkarspel Flora:

- 2 per hour intercity service Enkhuizen–Hoorn–Amsterdam–Hilversum–Amersfoort (–Deventer)
- 2 per hour intercity service Enkhuizen–Hoorn–Amsterdam (peak hours)
