= Zaandam railway station =

Railway station in the Netherlands

Zaandam
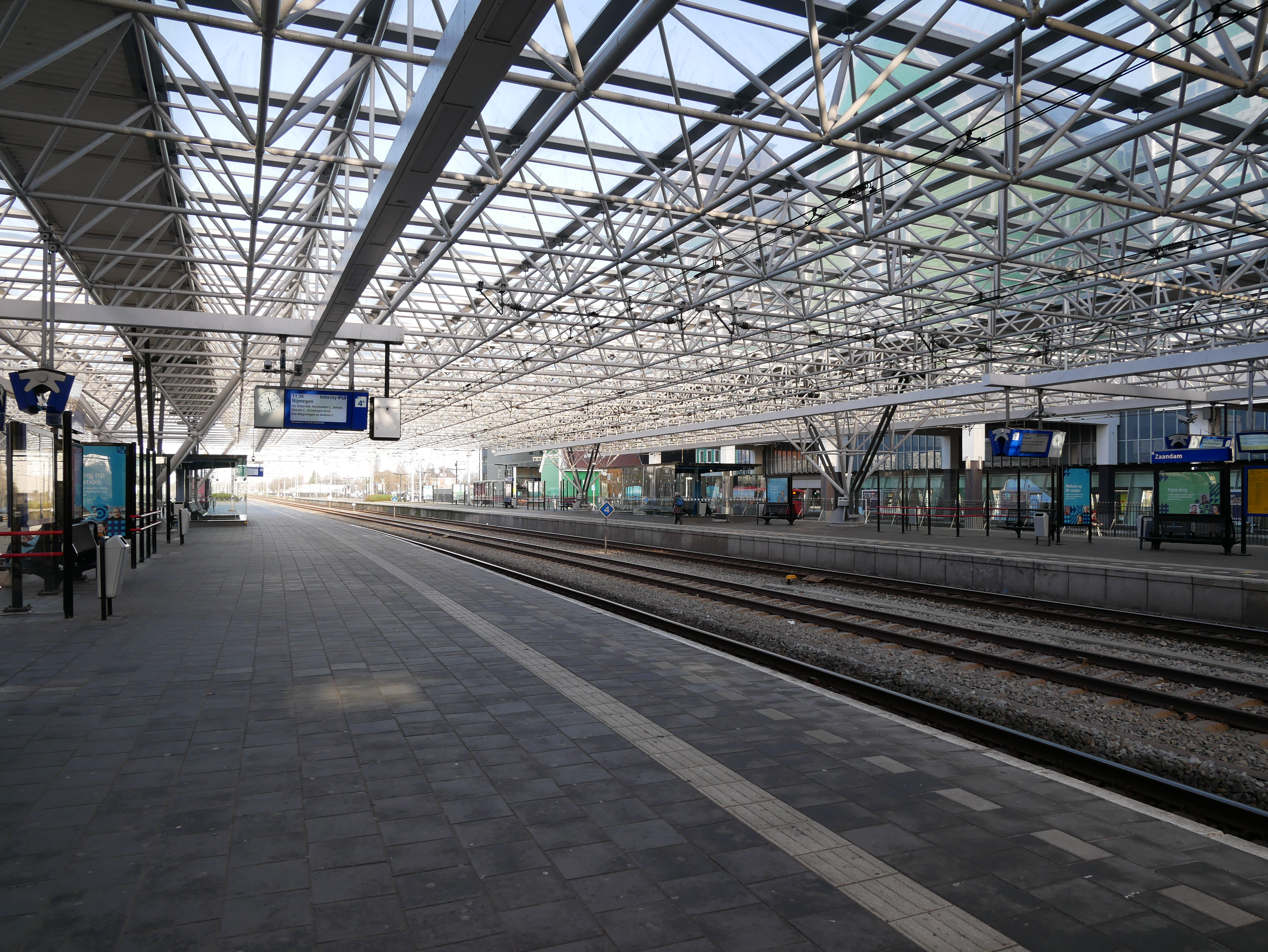
- Zaandam railway station

General information
- Location: Zaandam, North Holland, Netherlands
- Coordinates: 52°26′20″N 4°48′53″E
- Owner: Nederlandse Spoorwegen
- Lines: Den Helder–Amsterdam railway Zaandam–Enkhuizen railway
- Platforms: 4
- Tracks: 7

History
- Opened: 1 November 1869; 156 years ago

Services
Preceding station	Nederlandse Spoorwegen	Following station
Castricum towards Alkmaar	NS Intercity 2700 Mon-Thur until 19:00	Amsterdam Sloterdijk towards Maastricht
Castricum towards Alkmaar	NS Intercity 2700 Fri-Sun until 19:00	Amsterdam Sloterdijk towards Amsterdam Centraal
Castricum towards Den Helder	NS Intercity 3000	Amsterdam Sloterdijk towards Nijmegen
Koog aan de Zaan towards Uitgeest	NS Sprinter 4000	Amsterdam Sloterdijk towards Rotterdam Centraal
Zaandam Kogerveld towards Hoorn Kersenboogerd	NS Sprinter 4100	Amsterdam Sloterdijk towards Hoofddorp
Koog aan de Zaan towards Uitgeest	NS Sprinter 7400 Peak hours only	Amsterdam Sloterdijk towards Driebergen-Zeist
Location
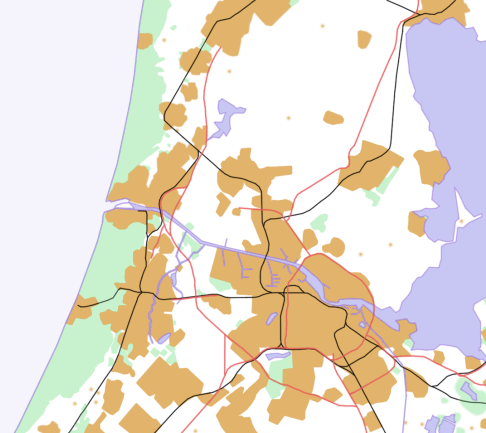
- Location within Northern Randstad Location within Netherlands

Zaandam is the main railway station of Zaandam, near Amsterdam, Netherlands. It is at the junction of the Den Helder–Amsterdam railway and the Zaandam–Enkhuizen railway.

== History ==
Zaandam's first station debuted on November 1, 1869. This station belonged to the SS Hoogezand category. This structure had a sizable middle section that included a ticket office and access to the platforms. The two lower parts of the structure were located at this middle section. There was a large clock on the facade, and a separate building stood next to the station.

In 1983 the Hemtunnel opened, this closing the Hembrug. The station was completely rebuilt, with the distinctive red roof. The station has 2 island platforms at ground level. In 1996 a south entrance was also opened. There were also a few small shops and a tunnel to a shopping centre in the town centre.

In 2007 the shops and tunnel were demolished. The restaurant closed, however the florist remains open.

At the end of 2007 a Kiosk shop was opened, where snacks and hot drinks can be purchased. In 2008 the station received a ticket hall for national and international tickets.

The bus station moved about 500 metres to the west of the main entrance after it closed in 2007, but town routes 9 and 10 continue to stop at a platform outside the station. On the site of the former bus station, where a bus station had stood, construction of a new City Hall is currently underway.

In December 2008, plans for opening an 'AH to Go' were terminated.

Since April 2018, the station has been extensively refurbished. End of 2019 is the anticipated completion date for the refurbishment.

== Train services ==
The following train services call at Zaandam:

- 2x per hour intercity service Schagen - Amsterdam - Utrecht - Eindhoven - Maastricht
- 2x per hour intercity service Den Helder - Amsterdam - Utrecht - Nijmegen
- 2x per hour local service (sprinter) Hoofddorp - Schiphol Airport - Zaandam - Hoorn Kersenboogerd
- 2x per hour local service (sprinter) Uitgeest - Zaandam - Amsterdam - Woerden - Rotterdam (all day, every day)
- 2x per hour local service (sprinter) Uitgeest - Zaandam - Amsterdam - Utrecht - Rhenen (only on weekdays until 8:00PM)

== Bus services ==
Bus Service	Route	Notes
Connexxion
59	Zaandam Station - Beverwijk Station	
63	Zaandam 't Kalf - Zaandam Station - Koog a/d Zaan Westerkoog - Westzaan Noord - Assendelft - Krommenie Station	
64	Zaandam Kogerveld - Zaandam Station - Koog a/d Zaan Westerkoog - Zaandijk Rooswijk	
65	Zaandam Station - Busstation De Vlinder	
69	Zaandam Station - Centrum - Koog a/d Zaan - Zaandijk - Wormerveer - Krommenie Station	
89	Zaandam Station - Koog a/d Zaan - Zaanse Schans - Wormerveer - Wormer - Wormerveer Noorderveld	
392	Zaandam Station - Centrum - Oostzaan - Amsterdam A v. Waertweg - Station Noord	
394	Zaandam Station - Centrum - Zaandam Peldersveld - Bus station De Vlinder - Amsterdam CS	
N61	Zaandam Station - Koog a/d Zaan - Zaandijk - Wormerveer - Krommenie	Niteliner
N62	Zaandam Station - Centrum - Zaandam Kogerveld - Zaandam 't Kalf	Niteliner
N63	Zaandam Station - Koog a/d Zaan Westerkoog - Westzaan Noord - Assendelft	Niteliner
N92	Amsterdam Leidseplein - Amsterdam CS - Buikslotermeerplein - Landsmeer - Oostzaan - Zaandam Station	Niteliner
N94	Amsterdam Leidseplein - Amsterdam CS - Noord - Zaandam Station - Koog a/d Zaan - Krommenie	Niteliner
