= Zandvoort aan Zee railway station =

Railway station in the Netherlands

Zandvoort aan Zee
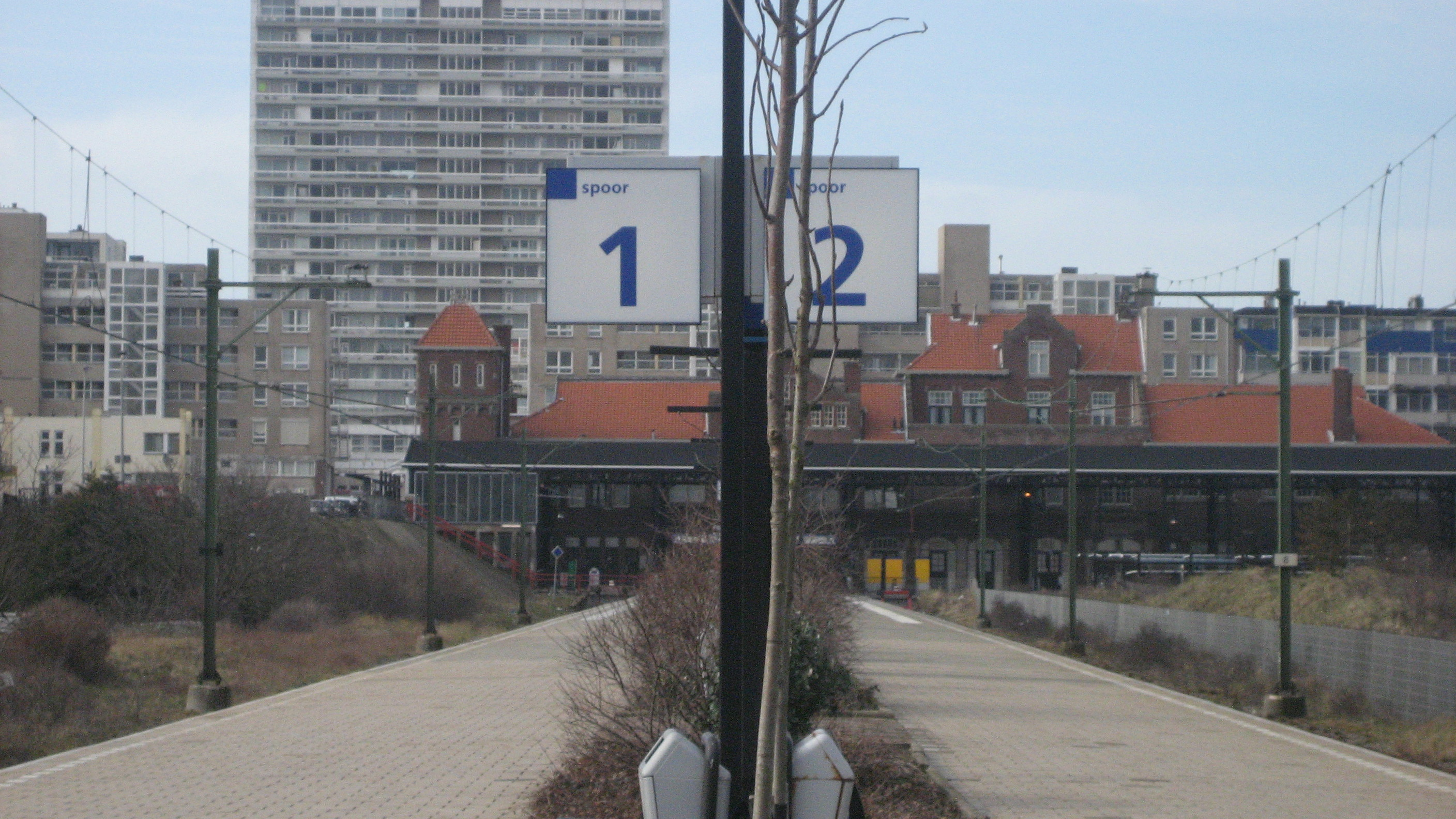
- Zandvoort aan Zee railway station

General information
- Location: Netherlands
- Coordinates: 52°22′33″N 4°31′53″E
- Line: Haarlem–Zandvoort railway
- Platforms: 2

History
- Opened: 3 June 1881

Services
Preceding station	Nederlandse Spoorwegen	Following station
Terminus	NS Sprinter 5400	Overveen towards Amsterdam Centraal
Terminus	NS Sprinter 15400	Overveen towards Haarlem
Location
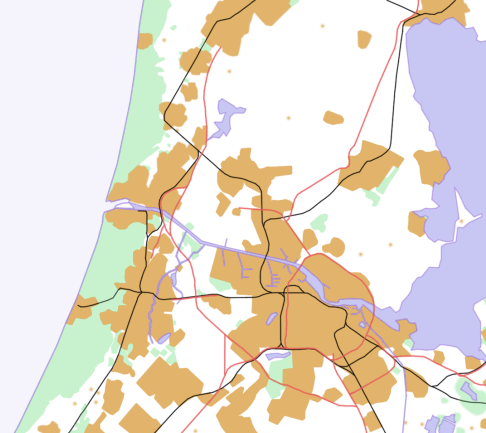
- Location within Northern Randstad Location within Netherlands

Zandvoort aan Zee is a terminal train station in the town of Zandvoort, Netherlands. The station opened on 3 June 1881, and is within walking distance of the beach. The station is on the Haarlem–Zandvoort railway. The station has two platforms and services are operated by Nederlandse Spoorwegen. Until 1995 trains from Maastricht and Heerlen terminated at this station.

== Train services ==
The following services call at Zandvoort aan Zee:

=== National rail ===
Train	Operator(s)	From	Via	To	Freq.	Service
Sprinter 5400	NS	Amsterdam Centraal	Amsterdam Sloterdijk - Halfweg-Zwanenburg- Haarlem Spaarnwoude - Haarlem - Overveen	Zandvoort aan Zee	2/hour	
Sprinter 15400	NS	Haarlem	Overveen	Zandvoort aan Zee	2/hour	Only in service during the summer season

=== Dutch Grand Prix ===
During the Dutch Grand Prix, NS runs extra services between Amsterdam Centraal and Zandvoort, with service frequencies as low as every 5 minutes at peak times. These services are named the "Max Express", a reference to Dutch Formula 1 driver Max Verstappen.

== Bus services ==
Operator	Line	Route	Service
Connexxion	81	Haarlem NS - Bloemendaal - Zandvoort aan Zee NS	
Connexxion	84	Haarlem NS - Bloemendaal - Zandvoort aan Zee NS	Only in service between the 9th of March and the 29th of September and only on busy days, at events in Bloemendaal and Zandvoort and when temperatures are 25 °C and above.
