= Weidevenne =

District of Purmerend, Netherlands

- District
- Location of Weidevenne within the city of Purmerend
- Interactive map of Weidevenne
- Coordinates: 52°29.83′N 4°56.33′E
- Country: Netherlands
- Province: North Holland
- Municipality: Purmerend

Population (2007)
  - Total: 14,451

Weidevenne is a district of Purmerend in the Netherlands, west of the Noordhollandsch Kanaal (North Holland Canal) across from the De Gors district. Its 14,451 inhabitants (as of 1-1-2007) mainly live in terraced houses. The population of Purmerend is expected to grow to 90,000, mainly due to the continuing expansion of Weidevenne. In November 2007 the district celebrated its tenth anniversary.

== Amenities ==
At the centre of the district is a shopping center with supermarkets and various specialty shops selling a variety of goods e.g. household articles and toys. An outpatient clinic, providing medical and dental care as well as speech therapy and physical therapy, and Weidekerkhuis, an ecumenical meetinghouse, are also situated in the district center. In December 2007 the Weidevenne railway station opened, where trains from Hoorn stop en route to Zaandam and Amsterdam.
