= Hoorn Kersenboogerd railway station =

Railway station in the Netherlands

Station Hoorn Kersenboogerd
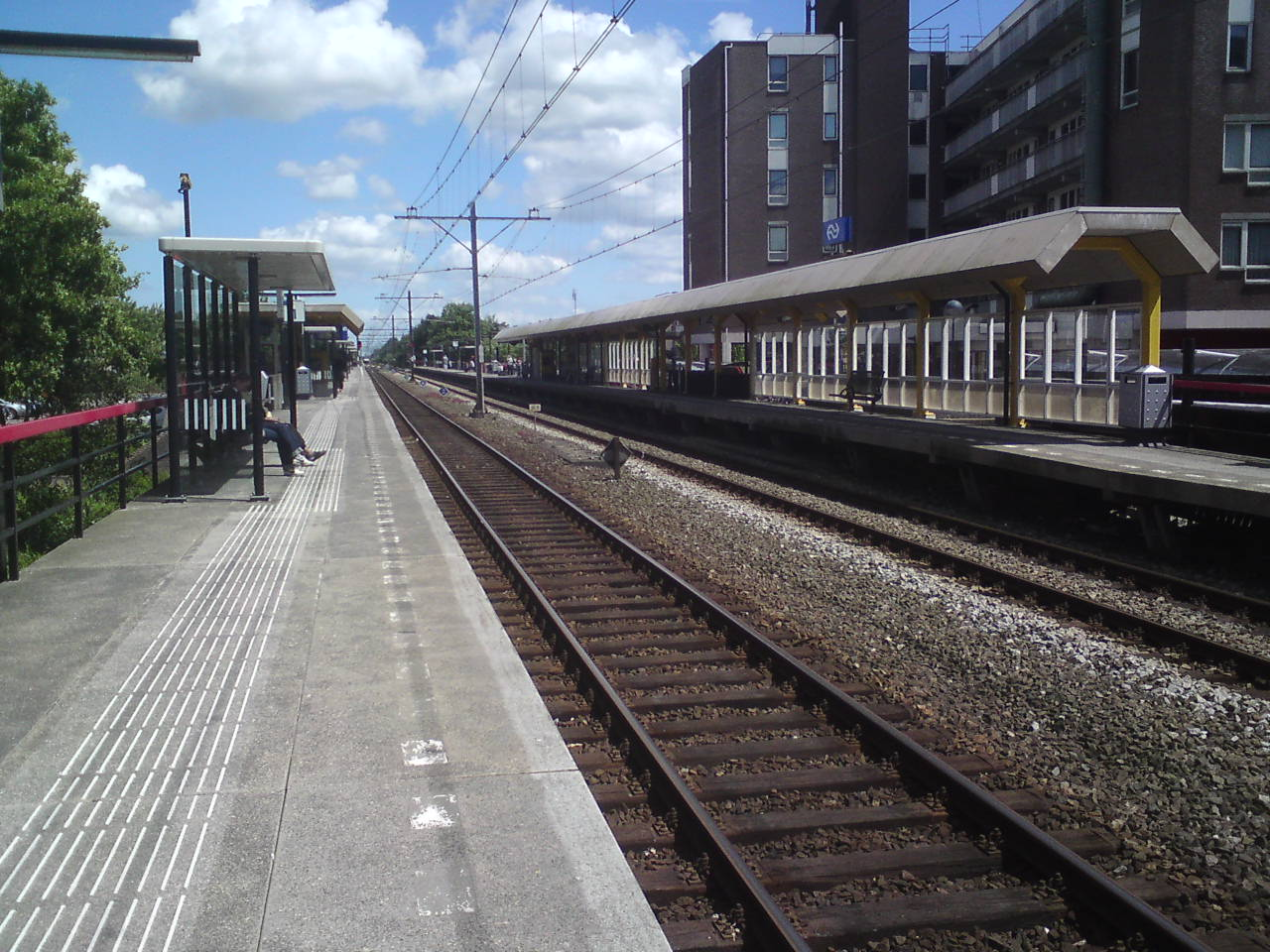

General information
- Location: Netherlands
- Coordinates: 52°39′12″N 5°5′6″E
- Line: Zaandam–Enkhuizen railway

Services
Preceding station	Nederlandse Spoorwegen	Following station
Hoorn towards Maastricht	NS Intercity 2900 After 19:00 and Fri-Sun only	Hoogkarspel towards Enkhuizen
Hoorn towards Amsterdam Centraal	NS Intercity 3700 Mon-Thur Peak Only	Hoogkarspel towards Enkhuizen
Hoorn towards Heerlen	NS Intercity 3900 Mon-Thur until 19:00	Hoogkarspel towards Enkhuizen
Hoorn towards Hoofddorp	NS Sprinter 4100	Terminus
Location
- Location within Netherlands

Hoorn Kersenboogerd (Dutch pronunciation: [ˌɦoːr(ə)ŋˌkɛrsə(m)ˈboːɣərt]) is a suburban railway station, in the Kersenboogerd district in Hoorn, Netherlands. The station opened on 29 May 1983, and is on the Zaandam–Enkhuizen railway. About 1 km east of the station is a siding where the "stoptrein" (all-station service) to and from to Hoofddorp can be turned around. From this point the line to Enkhuizen becomes single track. The station is located in the east of Hoorn, and was originally referred to in the plans as Hoorn Oost.

== Train services ==
The following services currently call at Hoorn Kersenboogerd:

- 2x per hour intercity service Enkhuizen - Hoorn – Amsterdam Centraal – Utrecht Centraal – 's-Hertogenbosch – Eindhoven – Heerlen / Roermond – Maastricht
- 2x per hour intercity service Enkhuizen - Hoorn - Amsterdam (peak hours)
- 2x per hour local service (sprinter) Leiden Centraal - Schiphol Airport - Zaandam - Hoorn Kersenboogerd

== Bus services ==
Line	Route
Connexxion
13	Hoorn NS - Hoorn South - Kersenboogerd South - Station Kersenboogerd - Blokker - Zwaag - Dijkgraaf (Bangert en Oosterpolder)
14	Kersenboogerd East - Hoorn North - Kersenboogerd Central - Station Kersenboogerd - Kersenboogerd South - Hoorn NS
