= Enkhuizen railway station =

Railway station in the Netherlands

Enkhuizen
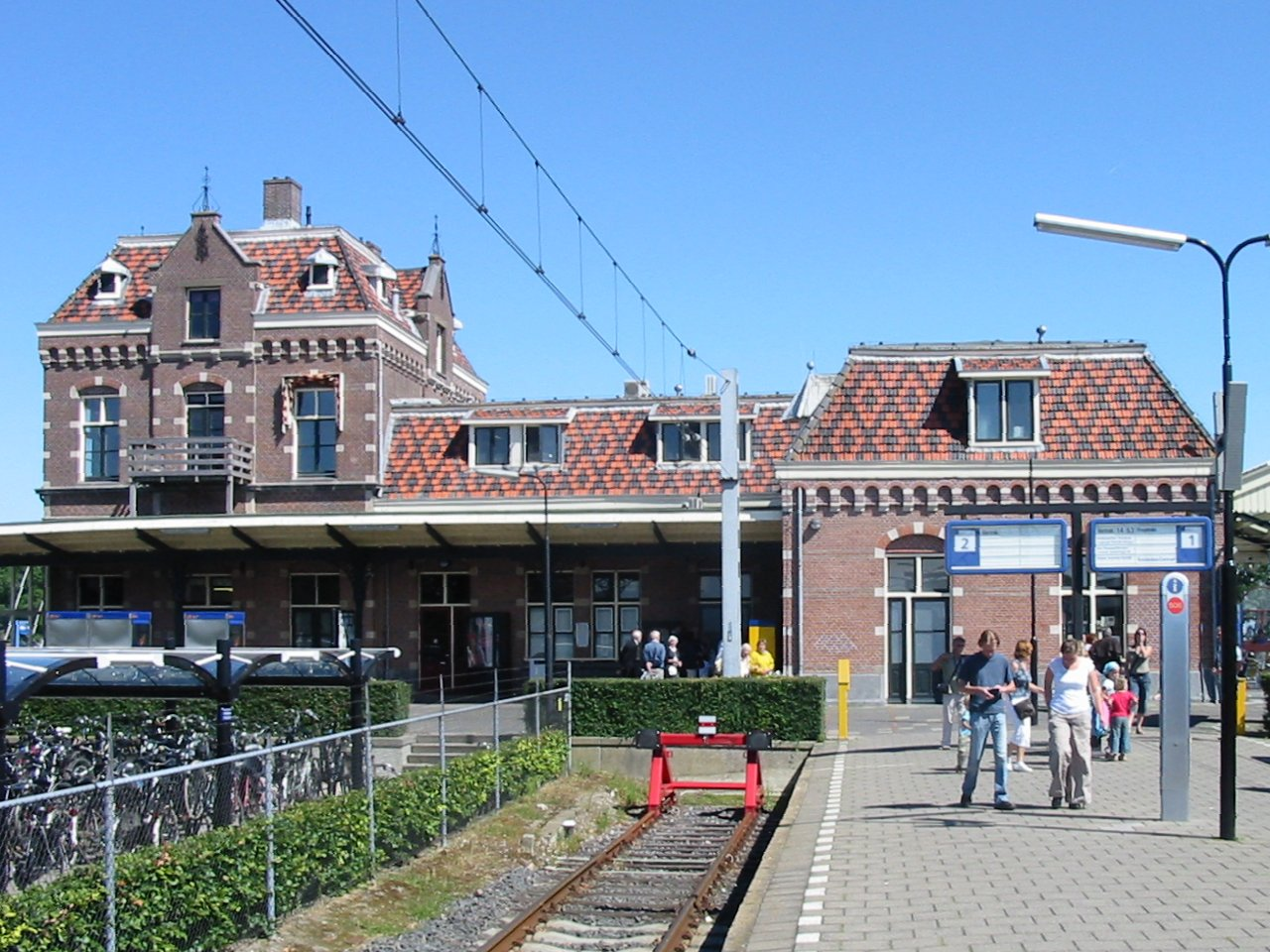
- Enkhuizen railway station

General information
- Location: Enkhuizen, Netherlands
- Coordinates: 52°41′58″N 5°17′16″E
- Owner: Nederlandse Spoorwegen
- Line: Zaandam–Enkhuizen railway
- Platforms: 2
- Tracks: 2

History
- Opened: 6 June 1885
- Electrified: 1974

Services
Preceding station	Nederlandse Spoorwegen	Following station
Bovenkarspel Flora towards Maastricht	NS Intercity 2900 After 19:00 and Fri-Sun only	Terminus
Bovenkarspel Flora towards Amsterdam Centraal	NS Intercity 3700 Mon-Thur Peak Only	Terminus
Bovenkarspel Flora towards Heerlen	NS Intercity 3900 Mon-Thur until 19:30	Terminus
Location
- Location within Netherlands

Enkhuizen is a terminus railway station in Enkhuizen, Netherlands. The station opened on 6 June 1885 and is located at the end of the Zaandam–Enkhuizen railway. The station and services are operated by Nederlandse Spoorwegen. The station has a nearby ferry departure point with a ferry to Stavoren. There is also a ferry to and from Medemblik, allowing one to travel the so-called "historical triangle" using the Steamtrain Hoorn Medemblik from Hoorn to Medemblik, the boat to Enkhuizen and the train back to Hoorn from here (or the other way around). Both ferry services operate only during the summer.

== Train services ==
The following services currently call at Enkhuizen:

- 2x per hour intercity service Enkhuizen–Hoorn–Amsterdam–Hilversum–Amersfoort (–Deventer)
- 2x per hour intercity service Enkhuizen–Hoorn–Amsterdam (peak hours)

== Bus service ==
Line	Route
Connexxion
138	Enkhuizen NS–Town Centre–Enkhuizen Noord (Flosbeugel)–Bovenkarspel–Grootebroek
650	Wevershoof–Andijk–Bovenkarspel-Grootebroek–Enkhuizen–Lelystad NS
