= Zaandam–Enkhuizen railway =

Railway line in the Netherlands

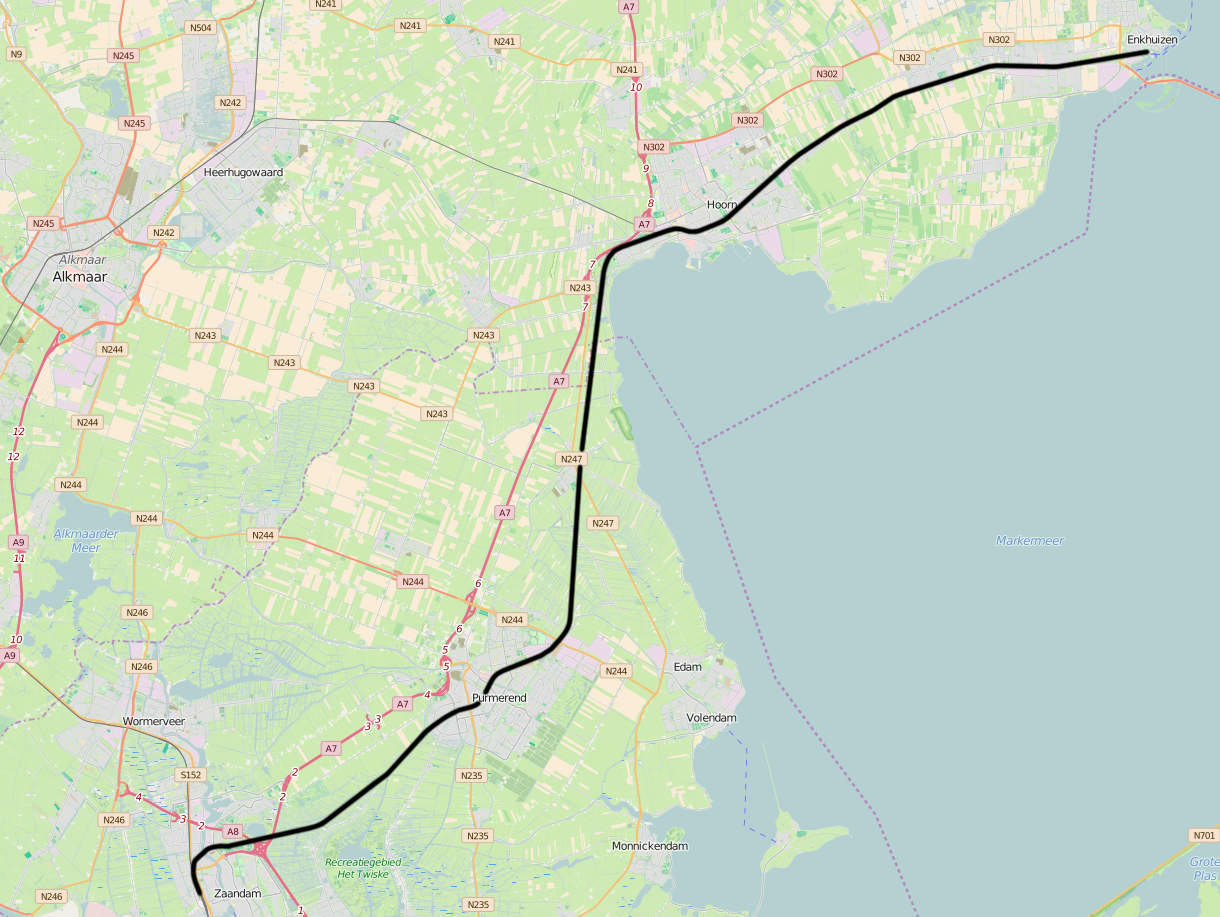
- Zaandam–Enkhuizen railway map

Overview
- Status: Operational
- Locale: Netherlands
- Termini: Zaandam railway station; Enkhuizen railway station

Service
- Operator(s): Nederlandse Spoorwegen

History
- Opened: 1884-1885

Technical
- Line length: 50 km (31 mi)
- Number of tracks: Zaandam–Hoorn: double track Hoorn–Enkhuizen: single track
- Track gauge: 1,435 mm (4 ft 8 1/2 in) standard gauge
- Electrification: 1.5 kV DC

The Zaandam–Enkhuizen railway is a railway line in the Netherlands running from Zaandam to Enkhuizen, passing through Purmerend and Hoorn. The line was opened between 1884 and 1885 by the Hollandsche IJzeren Spoorweg-Maatschappij.

== Stations ==
On the Zaandam-Enkhuizen railway, the principal interchange stations are:

- Zaandam: to Amsterdam and Alkmaar
- Hoorn: to Alkmaar
