= Flower bulb cultivation in the Netherlands =

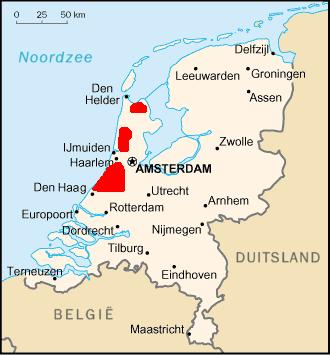
Some bulb cultivation areas

Flower bulb cultivation is an economic activity in the provinces of North Holland, South Holland and Flevoland. The colourful flower fields that have come to symbolise Holland can be seen in these areas around April.

== South Holland ==
- The Bollenstreek (lit. 'Bulb Region') extends from Leiden to Haarlem. It straddles southern North Holland and northern South Holland. This area, which includes Keukenhof flower garden, is the best known flower region.
- There are a few flower fields in the area south of Leiden (Wassenaar and Voorschoten)
- There are a few flower fields on the South Holland islands of Voorne-Putten and Goeree-Overflakkee. These fields are found in the sandy clay ground behind the dunes.

== North Holland ==
- Flower bulb cultivation takes place in Kennemerland in North Holland. The area extends roughly from the Haarlem area (including villages to the south and west of Haarlem) to Petten (northwest of Alkmaar). Wealthy merchants from Haarlem and Amsterdam introduced the cultivation of flower bulbs on a small scale basis in the sandy soil located close to the dunes in the 16th century. After the Tulip Mania crash of 1637, floriculture strongly declined. Unlike in the Duin- en Bollenstreek to the south, Kennemerland was not—despite the broad dune area south of Castricum—extensively cultivated for this purpose. In the 19th century the area had been earmarked for preservation of the Amsterdam water supply (Amsterdamse Waterleidingduinen) and as a location for the national steel company (Koninklijke Hoogovens).
- A region with bulb cultivation is the area around Breezand in the north of North Holland. This area also did not develop as extensively as the Duin- en Bollenstreek to the south. The soil was not as ideal and some of the bulb farmers left to work in the more developed area in the south.
- Each year in January, the National Tulip Day is being organized on the Dam Square in Amsterdam.

== Flevoland ==
Some of the largest bulb fields can be found in the Noordoostpolder. The Tulipsfestival (Dutch: Het Tulpenfestival) is an annual event, that celebrates the flowering of the colorful tulips.

== Towns and villages ==
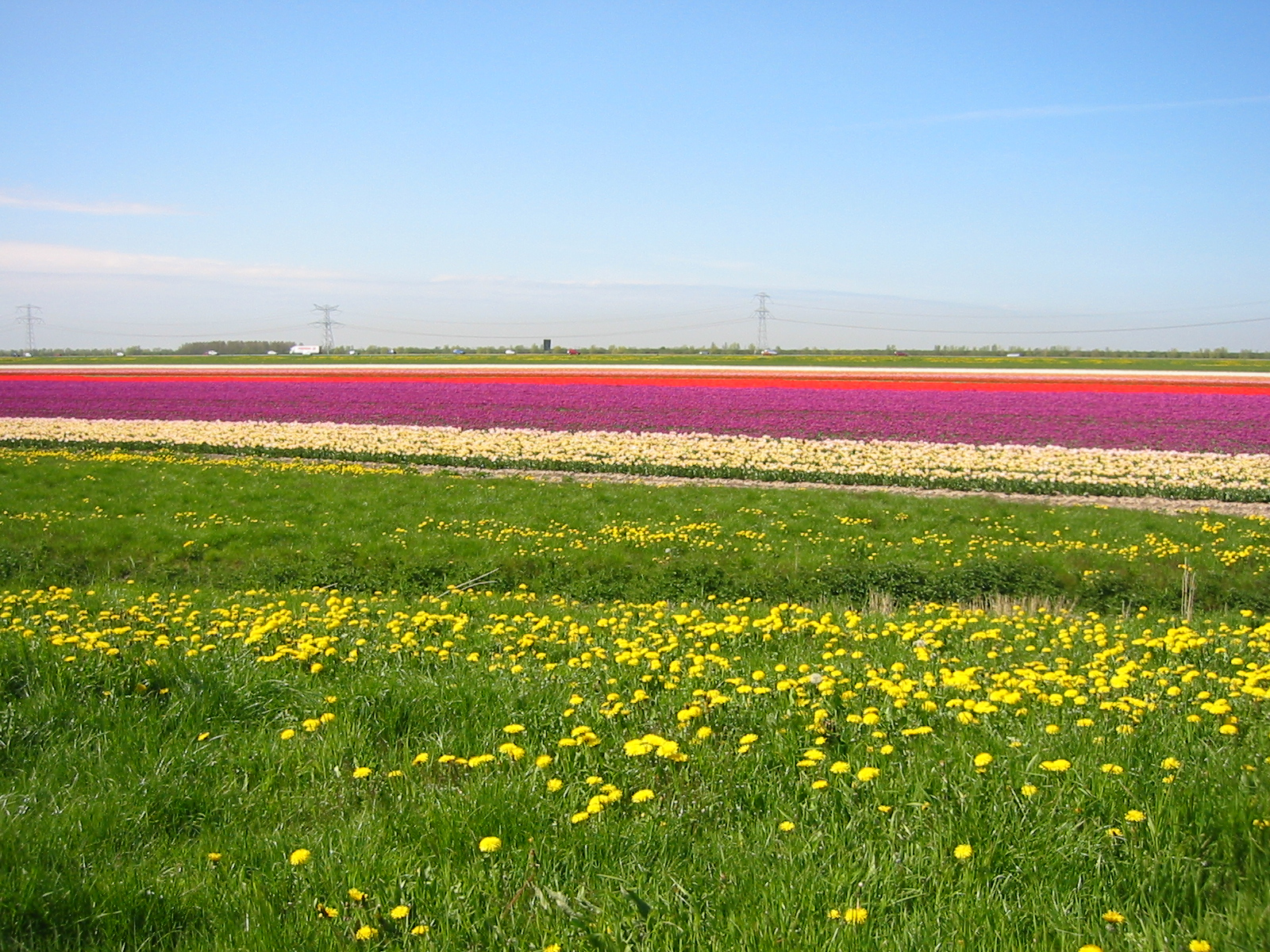
Flower fields in Holland

1926 Newsreel about the flower fields (in Dutch).

Towns and villages in the various parts of the Bulb Region:

- Aerdenhout
- Avenhorn
- Bant
- Bennebroek
- Bergen
- Beverwijk
- Bloemendaal
- Breezand
- Castricum
- Creil
- De Engel
- De Goorn
- De Kaag
- De Zilk
- Dronten
- Egmond
- Espel
- Groet
- Heemstede
- Heemskerk
- Haarlem
- Hillegom
- IJmuiden
- Julianadorp
- Katwijk
- Keukenhof
- Langevelderslag
- Lisse
- Lisserbroek
- Luttelgeest
- Noordwijk
- Noordwijkerhout
- Obdam
- Oegstgeest
- Overveen
- Piet Gijsenbrug
- Roosendaal
- Ruigenhoek
- Rutten
- Schermerhorn
- Sassenheim
- Schoorl
- Spierdijk
- Swifterbant
- Teylingen
- Tollebeek
- Uitgeest
- Ursem
- Velsen
- Velserbroek
- Vogelenzang
- Voorhout
- Voorschoten
- Warmond
- Wassenaar
- Wijk aan Zee
- Zandvoort
