= Wester-Koggenland =

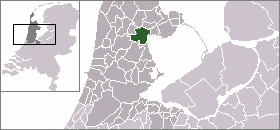
- Coordinates: 52°37′N 4°57′E
- Country: Kingdom of the Netherlands
- Constituent country: Netherlands
- Province: North Holland
- Municipality: Koggenland

Area
  - Total: 62.59 km^{2} (24.17 sq mi)
  - Land: 59.99 km^{2} (23.16 sq mi)
  - Water: 2.60 km^{2} (1.00 sq mi)

Population (2005)
  - Total: 13,757
  - Density: 229/km^{2} (590/sq mi)
- Time zone: UTC+1 (CET)
  - Summer (DST): UTC+2 (CEST)
- Website: www.wester-koggenland.nl

Wester-Koggenland (Dutch pronunciation: [ˌʋɛstər ˈkɔɣə(n)lɑnt]) is a former municipality of the Netherlands, located in the province of North Holland and the region of West-Frisia. The municipality ceased to exist on 1 January 2007 when it merged with Obdam to form the new municipality of Koggenland.

== Population centres ==
The area of the former municipality of Wester-Koggenland consists of the following cities, towns, villages and/or districts: Avenhorn, Berkhout, De Goorn, Oudendijk, Rustenburg, Scharwoude, Spierdijk, Ursem, Wogmeer (partly), Zuidermeer.

== Local government ==
Before the merger, the last municipal council of Wester-Koggenland consisted of 15 seats, which were divided as follows:

- CDA - 5 seats
- Gemeentebelangen - 4 seats
- VVD - 3 seats
- PvdA - 2 seats
- Fractie Mollet - 1 seat
