= Rustenburg (disambiguation) =

Rustenburg may refer to:

- Rustenburg town, Rustenburg Local Municipality, South Africa
- Rustenburg School for Girls, a school in Cape Town, South Africa
- Rustenburg (The Hague), a former estate in The Hague in the Netherlands on the site of which the Peace Palace, the seat of international law, was constructed
- Rustenburg (Amersfoort), a neighbourhood of Amersfoort in the Netherlands
- Rustenburg (North Holland), a village in the municipality of Koggenland in the Netherlands
