= The Zuiderzeedijk at Schardam =

Painting by Matthias Withoos

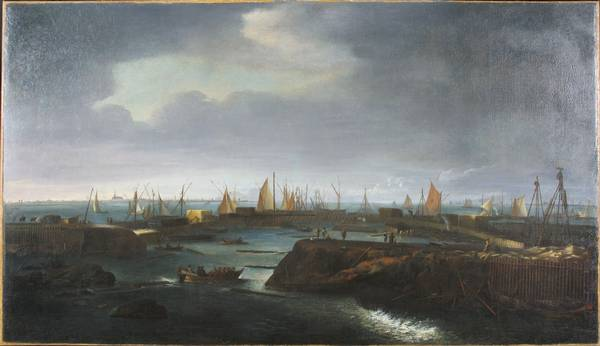
- The Zuiderzeedijk at Schardam (repair work after the 1675 All Saints Day Flood)
- Artist: Matthias Withoos
- Year: 1675-1676
- Location: Westfries Museum, Hoorn

The Zuiderzeedijk at Schardam is a painting by Matthias Withoos, marking a breach in the dike near the village of Schardam in the Province of North Holland. It shows repair work being carried out to the breach between Schardam and Scharwoude - it is thought to be the only painting of that period to show such repairs.

The painting has been owned for 340 years by the Van Foreest family and since 28 March 2015 has been on display at the Westfries Museum, in Hoorn.
