= Koggenland =

- Municipality
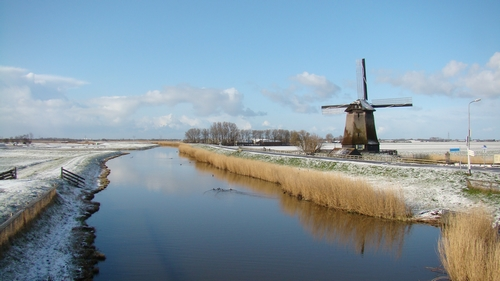
- Wind mill in Koggenland

- Flag Coat of arms

- Location in North Holland
- Coordinates: 52°38′N 4°57′E
- Country: Netherlands
- Province: North Holland
- Established: 1 January 2007

Government
  - Body: Municipal council
  - Mayor: Rob Posthumus (VVD)

Area
  - Total: 84.08 km^{2} (32.46 sq mi)
  - Land: 80.32 km^{2} (31.01 sq mi)
  - Water: 3.76 km^{2} (1.45 sq mi)
- Elevation: −3 m (−9.8 ft)

Population (January 2021)
  - Total: 22,940
  - Density: 286/km^{2} (740/sq mi)
- Time zone: UTC+1 (CET)
  - Summer (DST): UTC+2 (CEST)
- Postcode: Parts of 1600 and 1700 range
- Area code: 0226, 0229, 072
- Website: www.koggenland.nl

Koggenland (West Frisian: Koggelân) is a municipality in North Holland province and the region of West-Frisia of the Netherlands. It came into existence on 1 January 2007 upon the merger of the two former municipalities of Obdam and Wester-Koggenland.

The name of the municipality refers to the historic Kogge from the middle-ages. A kogge or cogge was a jurisdiction area of several villages or bannen (mostly around 4 or 5).

== Population centres ==
Villages:

- Avenhorn
- Berkhout
- Bobeldijk
- De Goorn
- Grosthuizen
- Hensbroek
- Obdam
- Oostmijzen
- Oudendijk
- Rustenburg
- Scharwoude
- Spierdijk
- Ursem
- Wogmeer
- Zuid-Spierdijk
- Zuidermeer

Hamlets:

- Baarsdorpermeer
- Berkmeer
- De Hulk
- Kathoek
- Noord-Spierdijk
- Noorddijk
- Noordermeer
- Oosteinde
- Obdammerdijk

== Topography ==
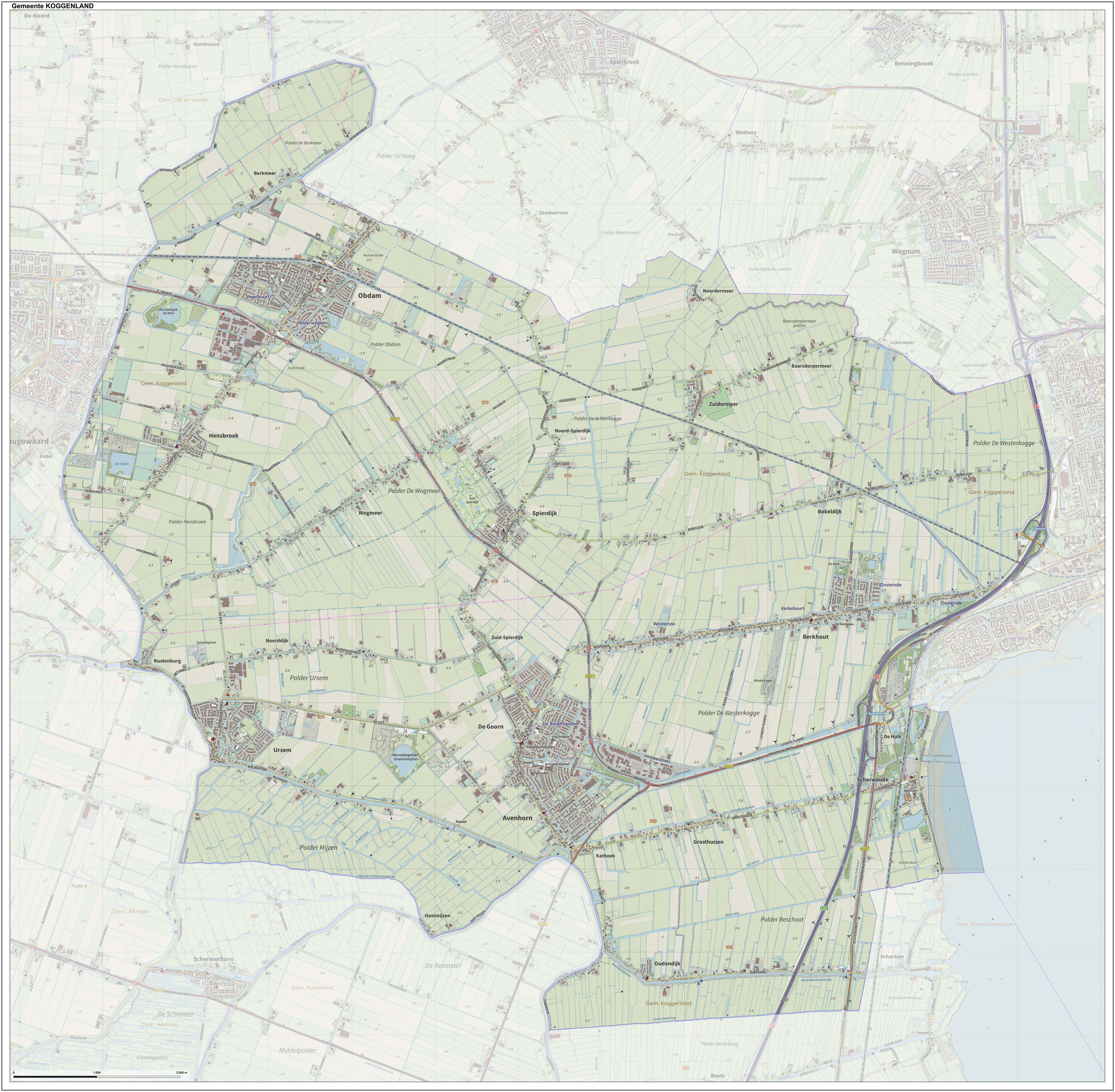

Dutch topographic map of the municipality of Koggenland, July 2015

== Notable people ==
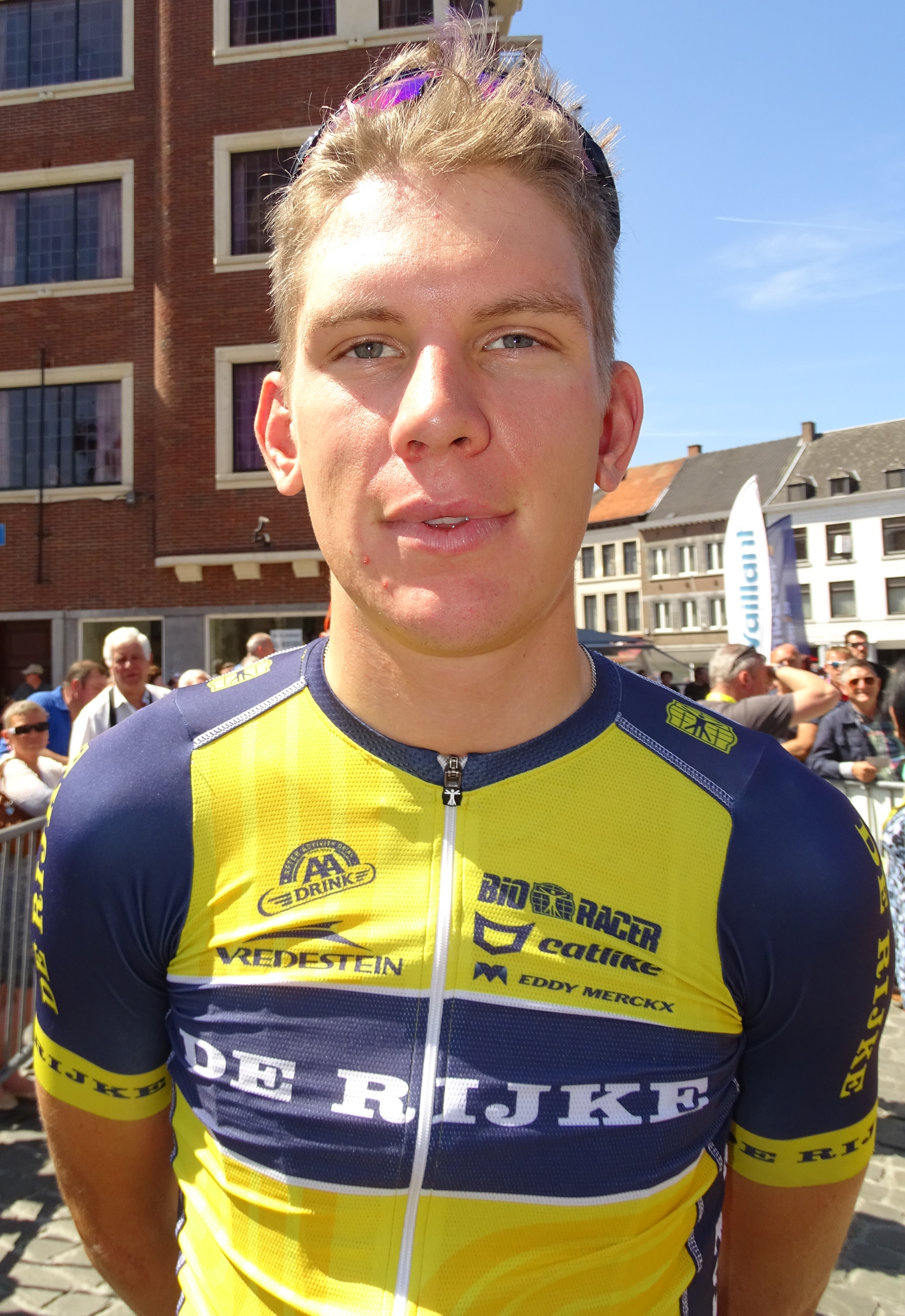
Jetse Bol, 2015

- Bernard Claesen Speirdyke (1663, prob. in Spierdijk – 1670) a 17th-century Dutch buccaneer
- Jacob Clay (1882 in Berkhout – 1955) a Dutch physicist who studied cosmic rays
- Henk Jonker (1912 in Berkhout – 2002) a Dutch photographer, most active in World War II
- Sander Lantinga (born 1976 in Biddinghuizen) a radio & TV program maker, a radio-DJ and streaker

=== Sport ===
- Ron Vlaar (born 1985 in Hensbroek) a Dutch footballer with over 300 club caps
- Jetse Bol (born 1989 in Avenhorn) a professional Dutch road bicycle racer

== Gallery ==
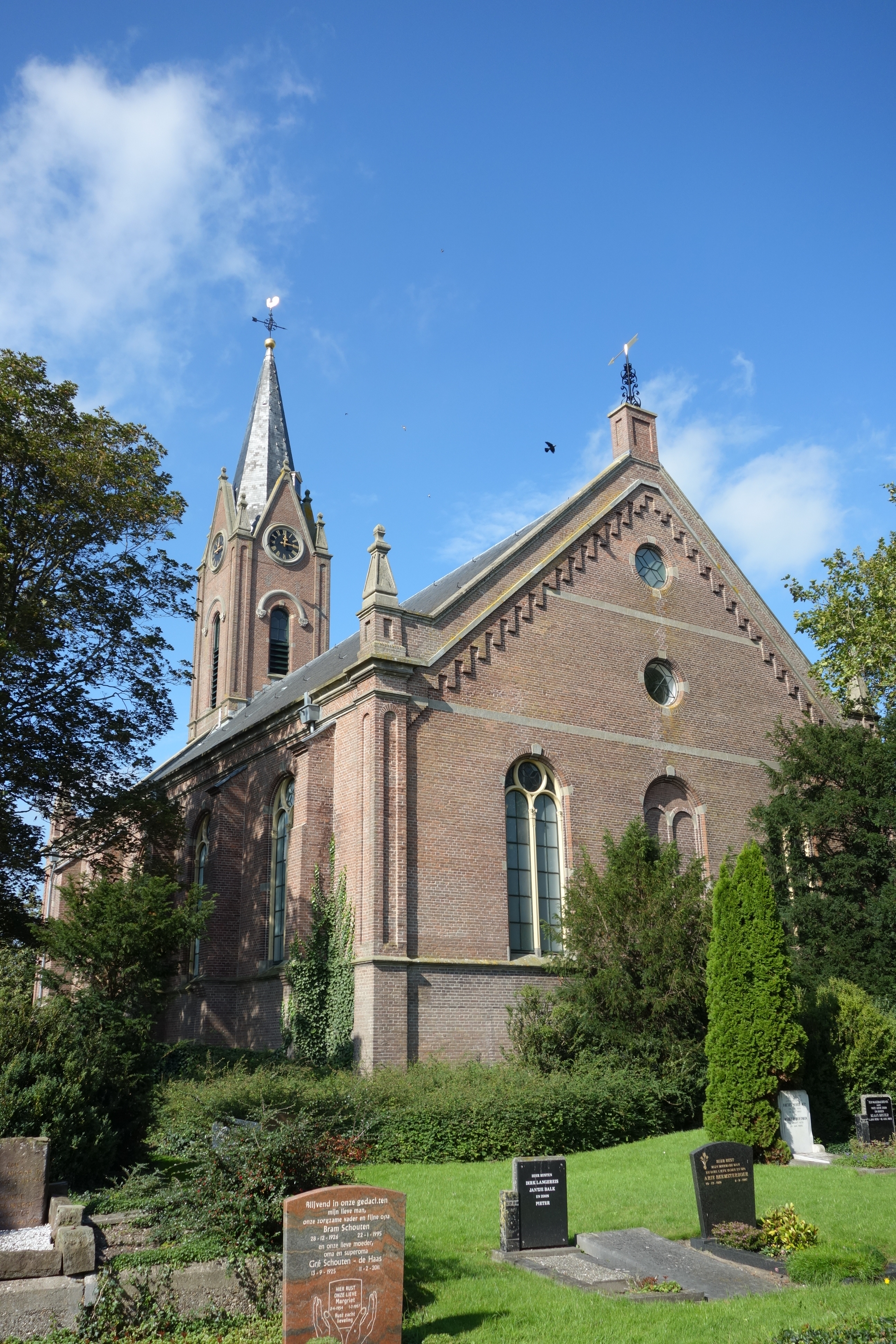
Nederlands Hervormde Kerk, Berkhout (viewed from the back)

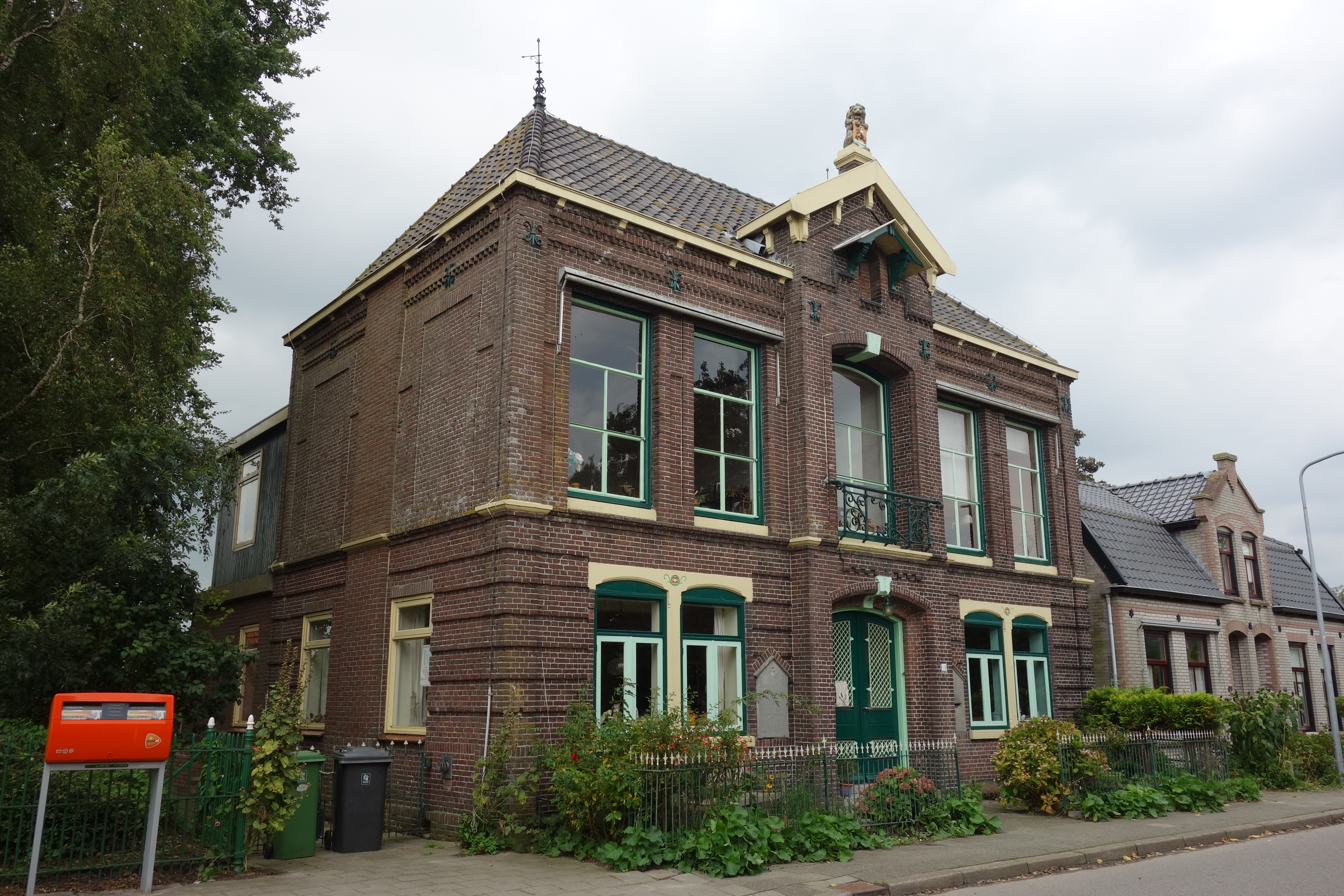
Voormalig Raadhuis, Grosthuizen

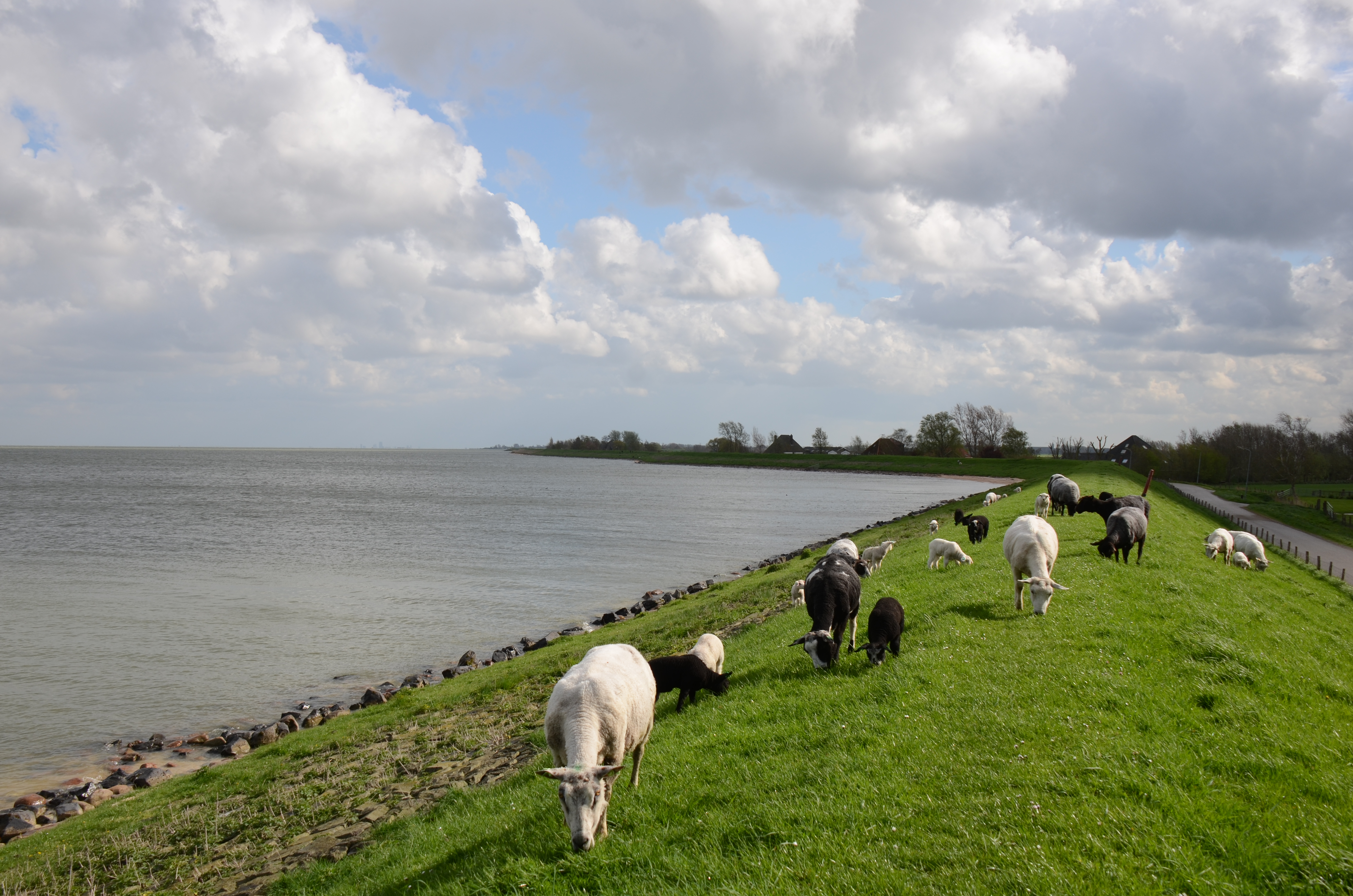
Markermeer dike near Scharwoude

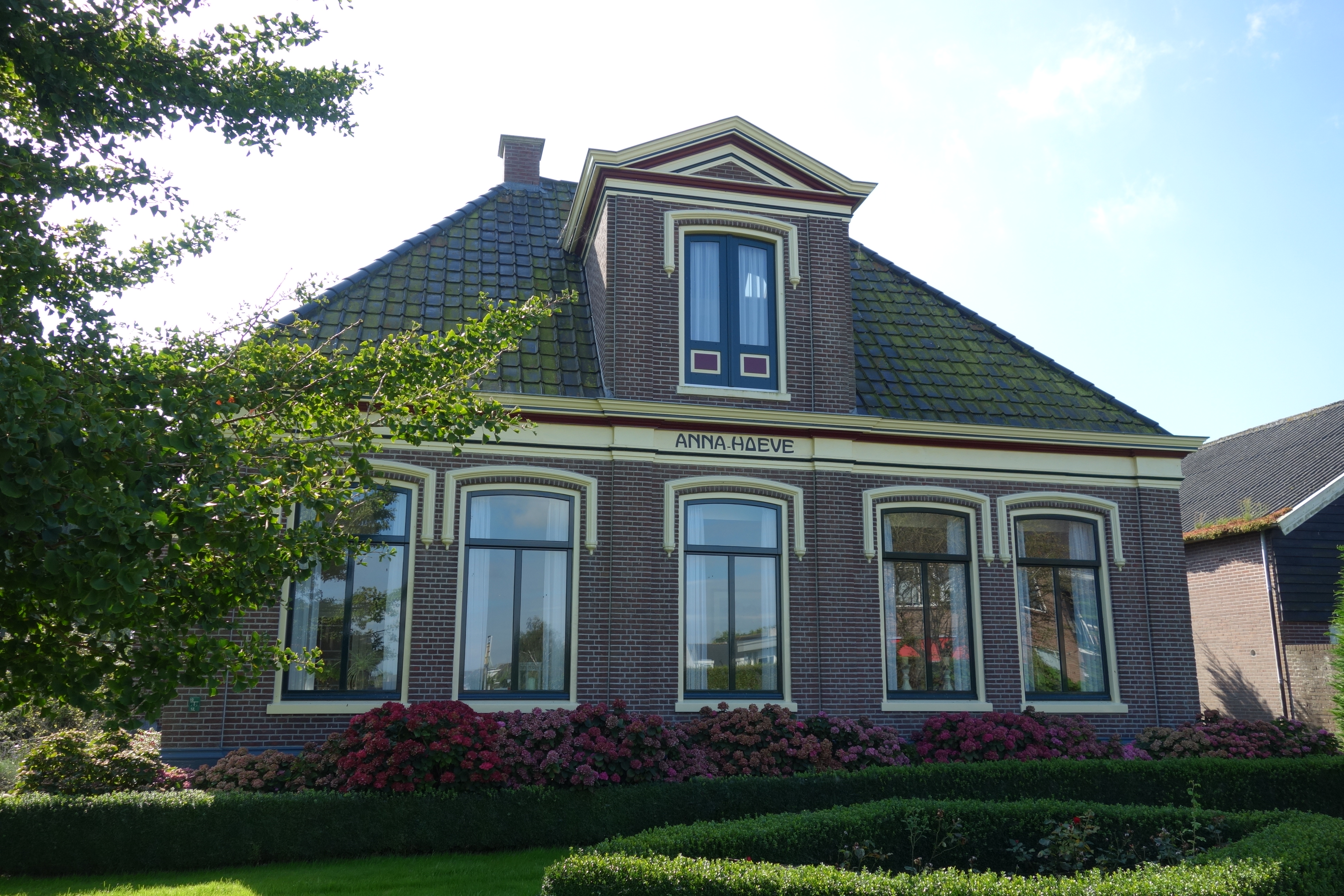
Anna Hoeve, Berkhout
