= Grosthuizen =

- Village
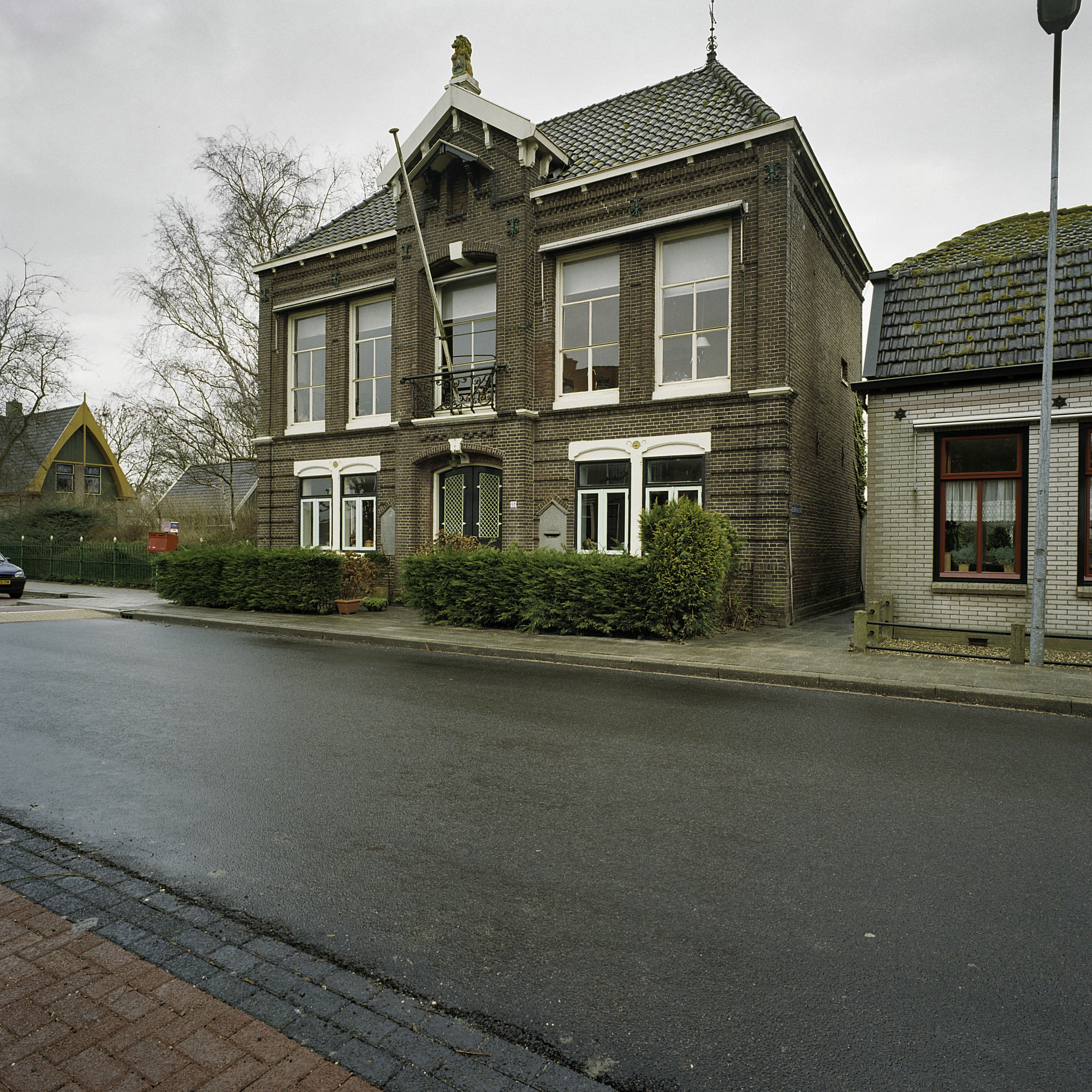
- Former town hall

- Coat of arms

- Location in the Netherlands Location in the province of North Holland in the Netherlands
- Coordinates: 52°37′N 4°59′E
- Country: Netherlands
- Province: North Holland
- Municipality: Koggenland

Area
  - Total: 4.14 km^{2} (1.60 sq mi)
- Elevation: −2.2 m (−7.2 ft)

Population (2025)
  - Total: 415
  - Density: 100/km^{2} (260/sq mi)
- Time zone: UTC+1 (CET)
  - Summer (DST): UTC+2 (CEST)
- Postal code: 1633
- Dialing code: 0229
- Website: https://www.grosthuizen.nl

Grosthuizen is a village in the Dutch province of North Holland. It is a part of the municipality of Koggenland, and lies about 7 km southwest of Hoorn.

The village was first mentioned in the 12th century 1420 Asthusa, and means "big (eastern) settlement". Grost (big) was added to distinguish from Oosthuizen. Later Ast (east) was dropped from the name. Grosthuizen developed as a peat excavation settlement in the 13th century. In 1874, a church was built, but demolished in 1965. Only a belfry remains.

Grosthuizen was home to 307 people in 1840. It was a separate municipality between 1817 and 1854, when it was merged with Avenhorn. In 2007, it became part of the municipality of Koggenland.
