= Manuel Ribeiro Pardal =

17th-century Portuguese privateer

Manuel Ribeiro Pardal (died 1671), also known as Manuel Rivero Pardal or Pardel, was a 17th-century Portuguese privateer in Spanish service during the late 1660s and early 1670s.

== Biography ==
Pardal was originally hired by the Spanish to attack English bases in the Caribbean following Captain Henry Morgan's raid on Puerto Bello in 1668. Although it was anticipated that he would take on Morgan himself, Pardal instead attacked the turtle-hunting settlement on Little Cayman in 1669. Flying under false colors with a fleet of five ships, Pardal's 200-man force landed on the beach, burned homes and turtle sloops and captured the Jamaican ship Hopewell. Before leaving for Cuba, Pardal reportedly took two sloops and several prisoners with him.

While in Cuba, he encountered Dutch pirate Bernard Speirdyke and later captured his ship. Upon Pardal's return to Cartagena, Colombia, in 1671, a festival was held in his honor, and he was appointed "Admiral of the Corsairs" by the governor. During that same year, he sailed with his flagship, the San Pedro, and a captured a French frigate, seizing another sloop and attacking remote villages on the northern Jamaican coastline. According to popular lore, he wrote a poem issuing a challenge to Captain Henry Morgan, which was written on sailcloth and hung on a tree at Point Negril:

"I come to seek General Morgan with two shippes of twenty guns and, having seen this, I crave he would come out upon ye coast to seeke mee, that hee might see ye valour of ye Spanish."

The authorities in Jamaica became alarmed, to the extent that Governor Thomas Modyford authorized Captain Morgan to defend Port Royal against Pardal. However, Morgan instead used that an excuse to assemble a fleet to launch his now-famous raid on Panama, despite the peace agreement between England and Spain following the signing of the Treaty of Madrid.

Pardal was eventually killed, and his flagship San Pedro y Fama captured, off the north coast of Cuba, in battle against Captain John Morris, a lieutenant of Captain Morgan.
