= Obdam =

- Village
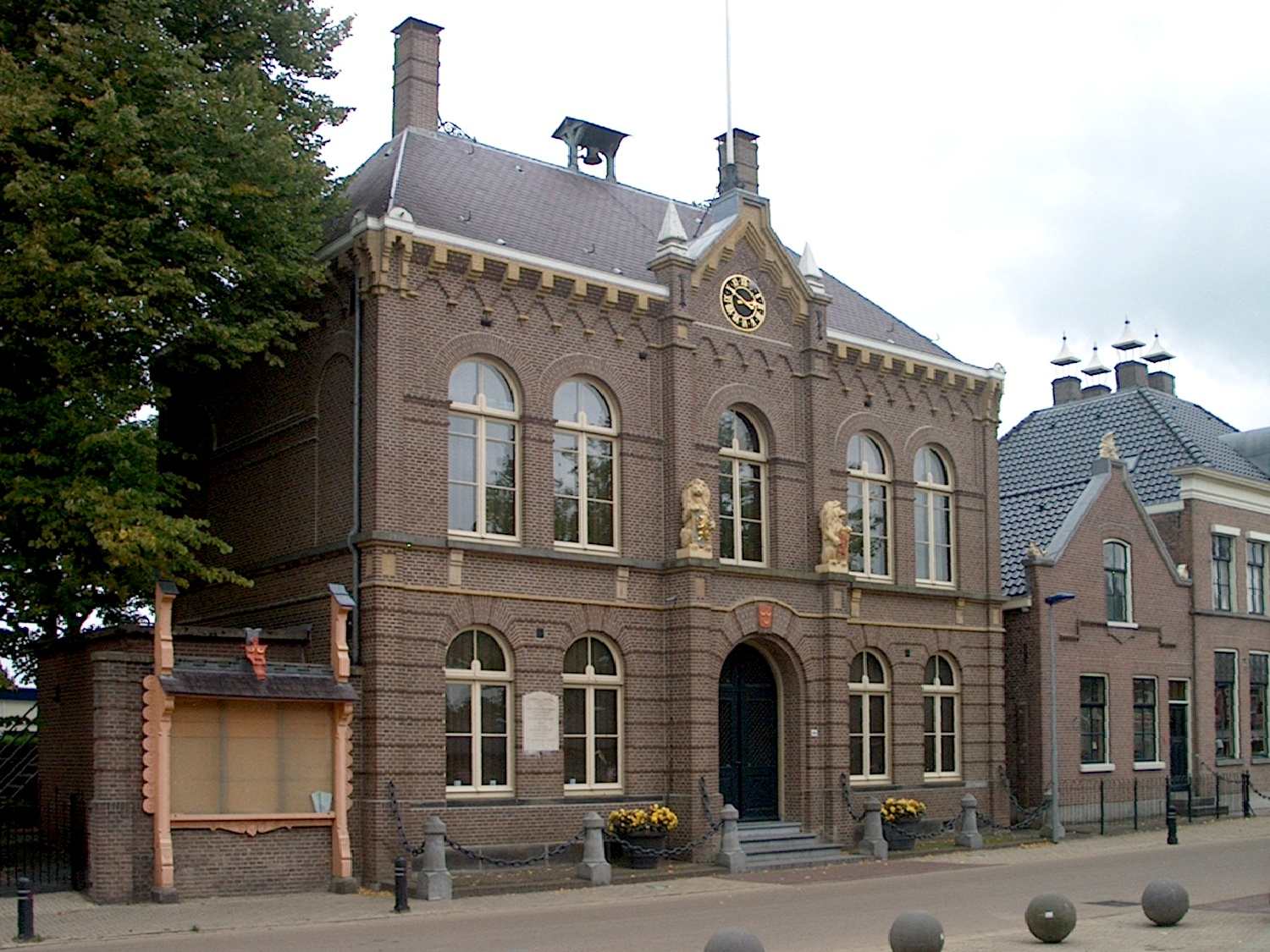
- Former town hall

- Coat of arms

- Location in the Netherlands Location in the province of North Holland in the Netherlands
- Coordinates: 52°40′28″N 4°54′14″E
- Country: Kingdom of the Netherlands
- Constituent country: Netherlands
- Province: North Holland
- Municipality: Koggenland

Area
  - Village: 11.25 km^{2} (4.34 sq mi)

Population (2025)
  - Village: 5,980
  - Density: 532/km^{2} (1,380/sq mi)
  - Urban: 5,590
  - Rural: 390
- Time zone: UTC+1 (CET)
  - Summer (DST): UTC+2 (CEST)
- Postal code: 1713
- Dialing code: 0226
- Website: www.obdam.nl

Obdam (Dutch pronunciation: [ɔbˈdɑm]) is a village and former municipality in the Netherlands, in the province of North Holland and the region of West-Frisia. The municipality ceased to exist on 1 January 2007 when it merged with Wester-Koggenland to form the new municipality of Koggenland.

== Population centres ==
The area of the former municipality contains the following small towns and villages: Berkmeer, Hensbroek, Obdam and Wogmeer (partly).

== Train services ==
Obden has a railway station. It has regular direct services to Hoorn and, by changing trains there, services to Amsterdam.

== Chronology ==
- 1503 - The van Duvenvoorde family become the Lords of the town.
- 1610 - Birth of Jacob, Baron van Wassenaer, Lord of Obdam; Son of Jacob van Duvenvoorde van Wassenaer.
- 1620 - Jacob van Duvenvoorde starts using the van Wassenaer family name and becomes Jacob van Duvenvoorde van Wassenaer.
- 1665 - Jacob, Baron van Wassenaer, Lord Of Obdam dies during a sea battle with the English while the captain of a Dutch vessel.
- 1979 - Founding of the new municipality, including the towns of Hensbroek and Wogmeer.
- 2007 - Obdam municipality merges into the new municipality of Koggenland.
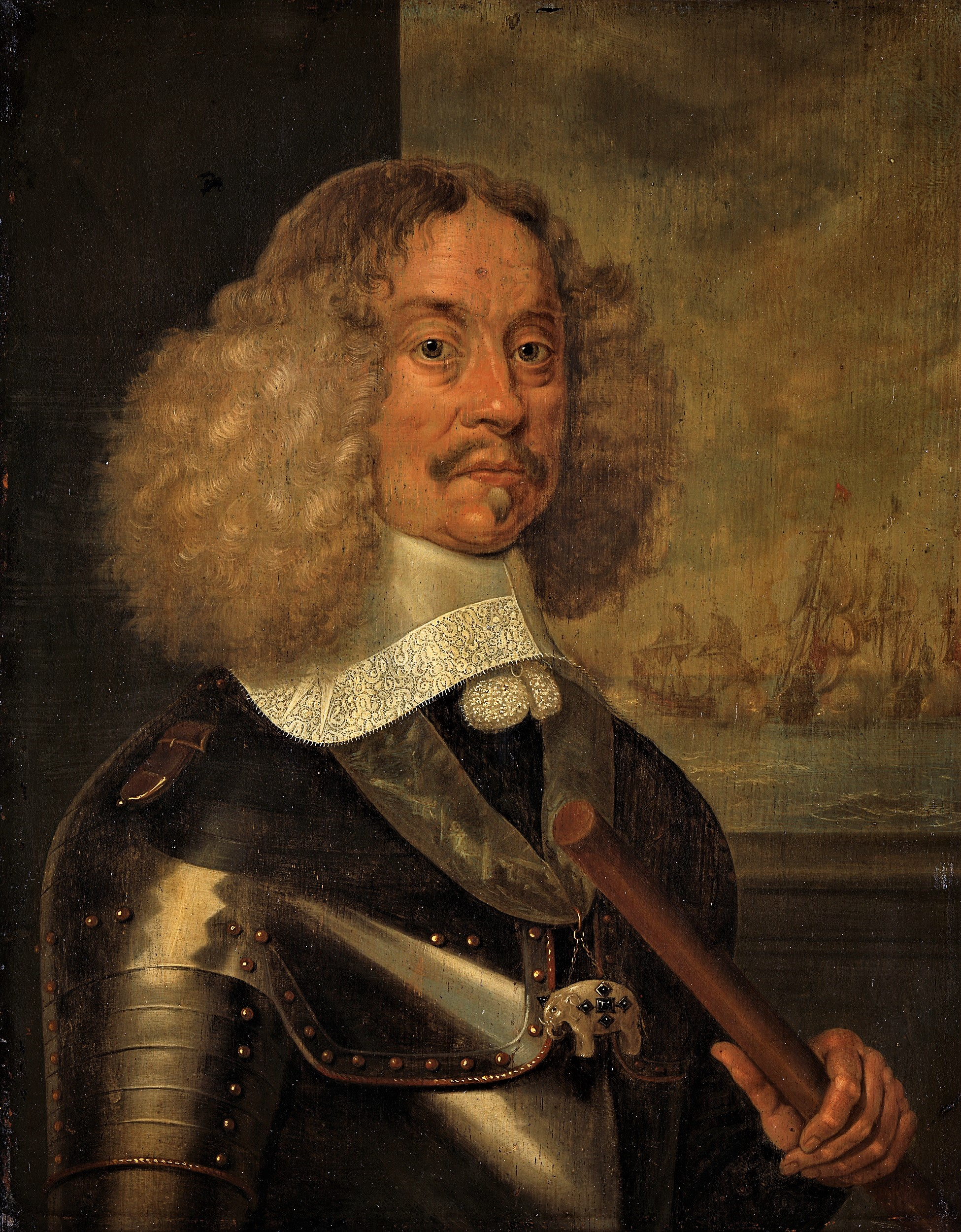
Jacob, Baron van Wassenaer, Lord of Obdam by Abraham Evertsz. van Westerveld

== Local government ==
Before the merger, the last municipal council of Obdam, elected in 2002, consisted of 13 seats, which were divided as follows:

- CDA - 5 seats
- Gemeente Partij Obdam - 4 seats
- PvdA - 2 seats
- VVD - 2 seats
