= Oudendijk, North Holland =

Oudendijk
- Village
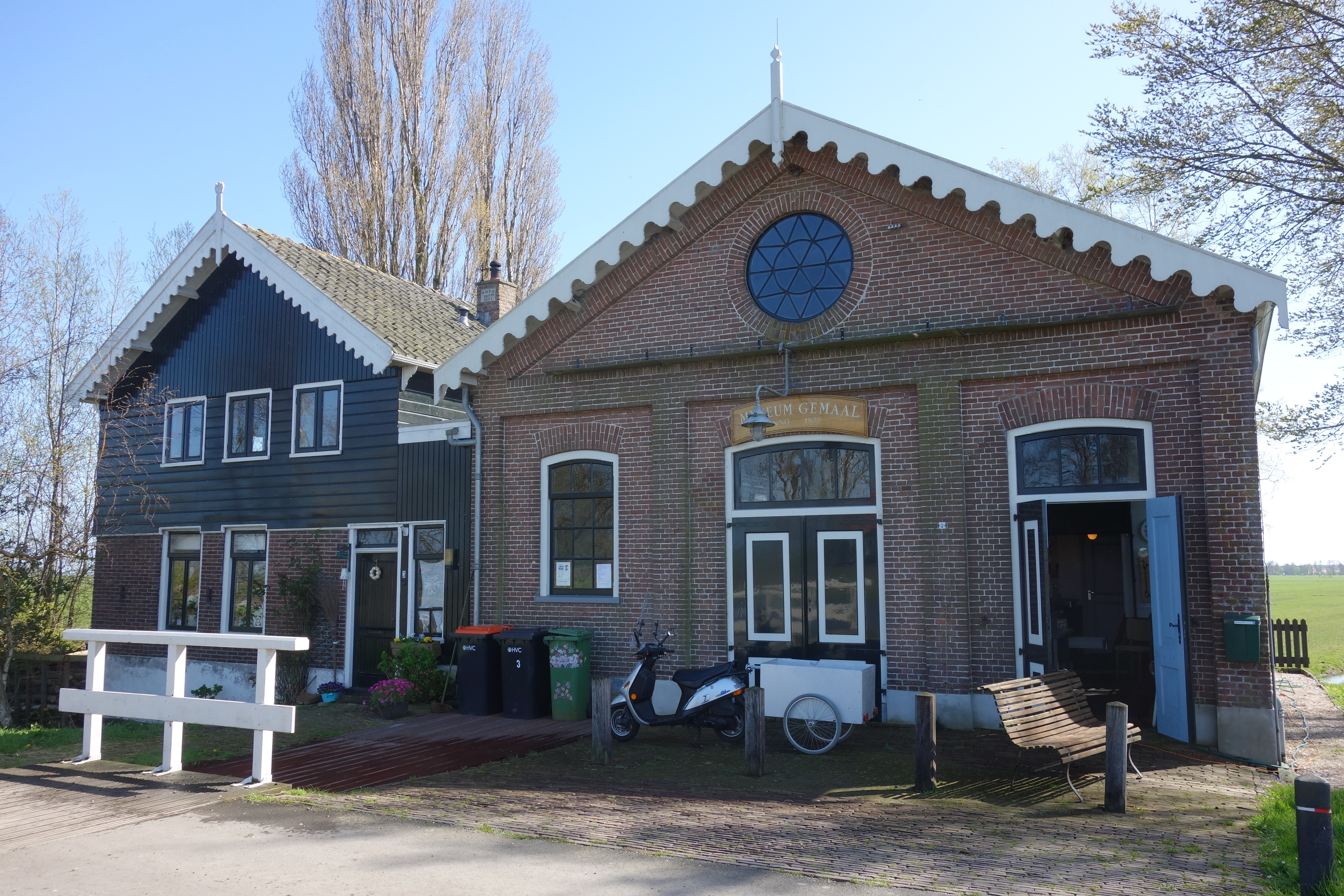
- Diesel pumping station Beetskoog

- Location in the Netherlands Location in the province of North Holland in the Netherlands
- Coordinates: 52°36′N 4°58′E
- Country: Netherlands
- Province: North Holland
- Municipality: Koggenland

Area
  - Total: 6.29 km^{2} (2.43 sq mi)
- Elevation: −1.5 m (−4.9 ft)

Population (2025)
  - Total: 430
  - Density: 68/km^{2} (180/sq mi)
- Time zone: UTC+1 (CET)
  - Summer (DST): UTC+2 (CEST)
- Postal code: 1631
- Dialing code: 0229

Oudendijk is a village in the Dutch province of North Holland. It is a part of the municipality of Koggenland, and lies about 9 km (5.6 mi) southwest of Hoorn.

== History ==
The village was first mentioned in 1423 or 1424 as "binnen den Ban van Oudendyc", and means "old dike". Oudendijk developed along the dike in the 12th century. During the 13th century, the peat around to the north was excavated.

The Dutch Reformed church is a single aisled church with ridge turret which was built in 1649 to replace a 15th century church.

Oudendijk was home to 346 people in 1840. It was a separate municipality between 1817 and 1979, when the new municipality of Wester-Koggenland was created. In 2007, it became part of the municipality of Koggenland.

== Gallery ==
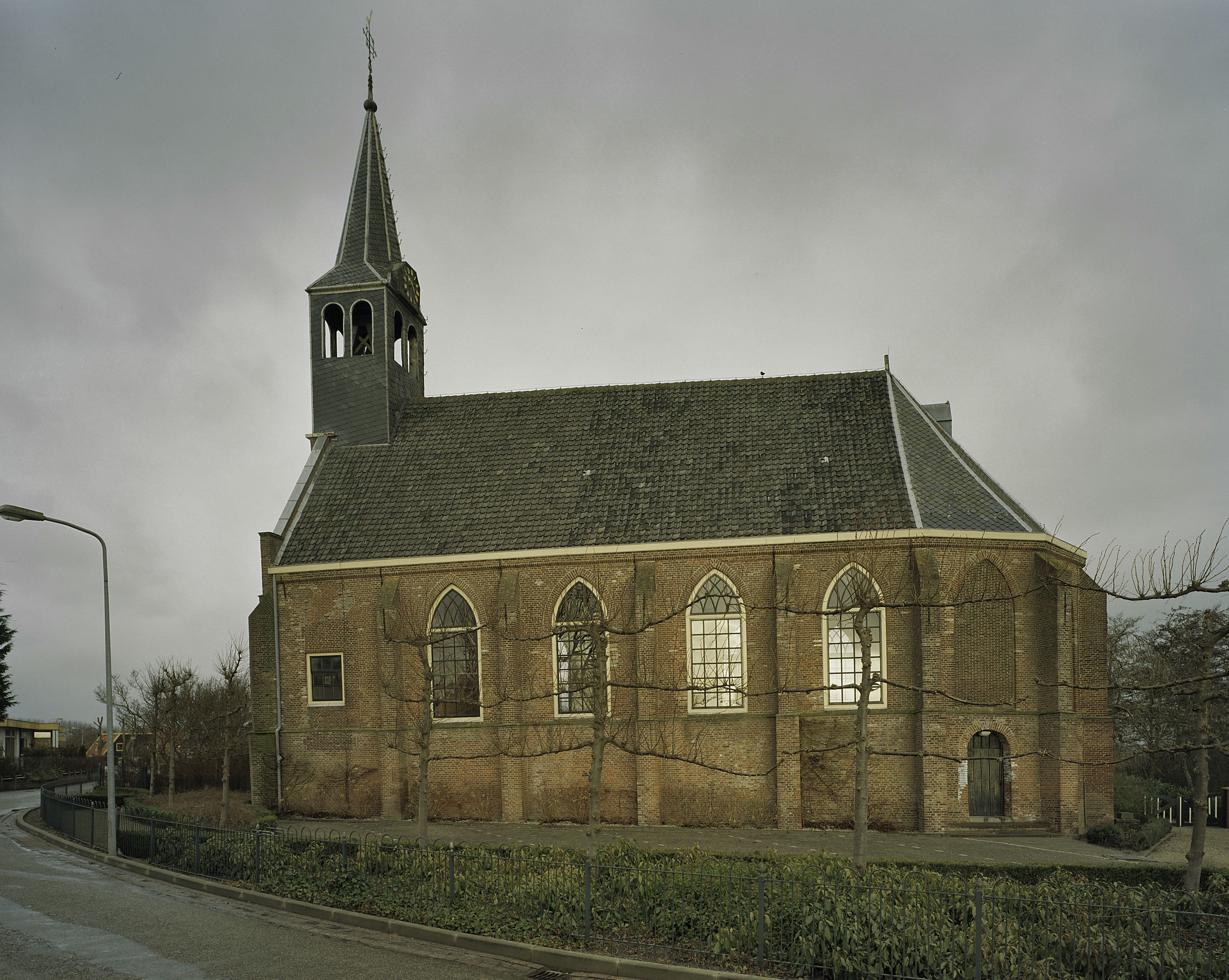
Dutch Reformed church
