= Hensbroek =

- Village
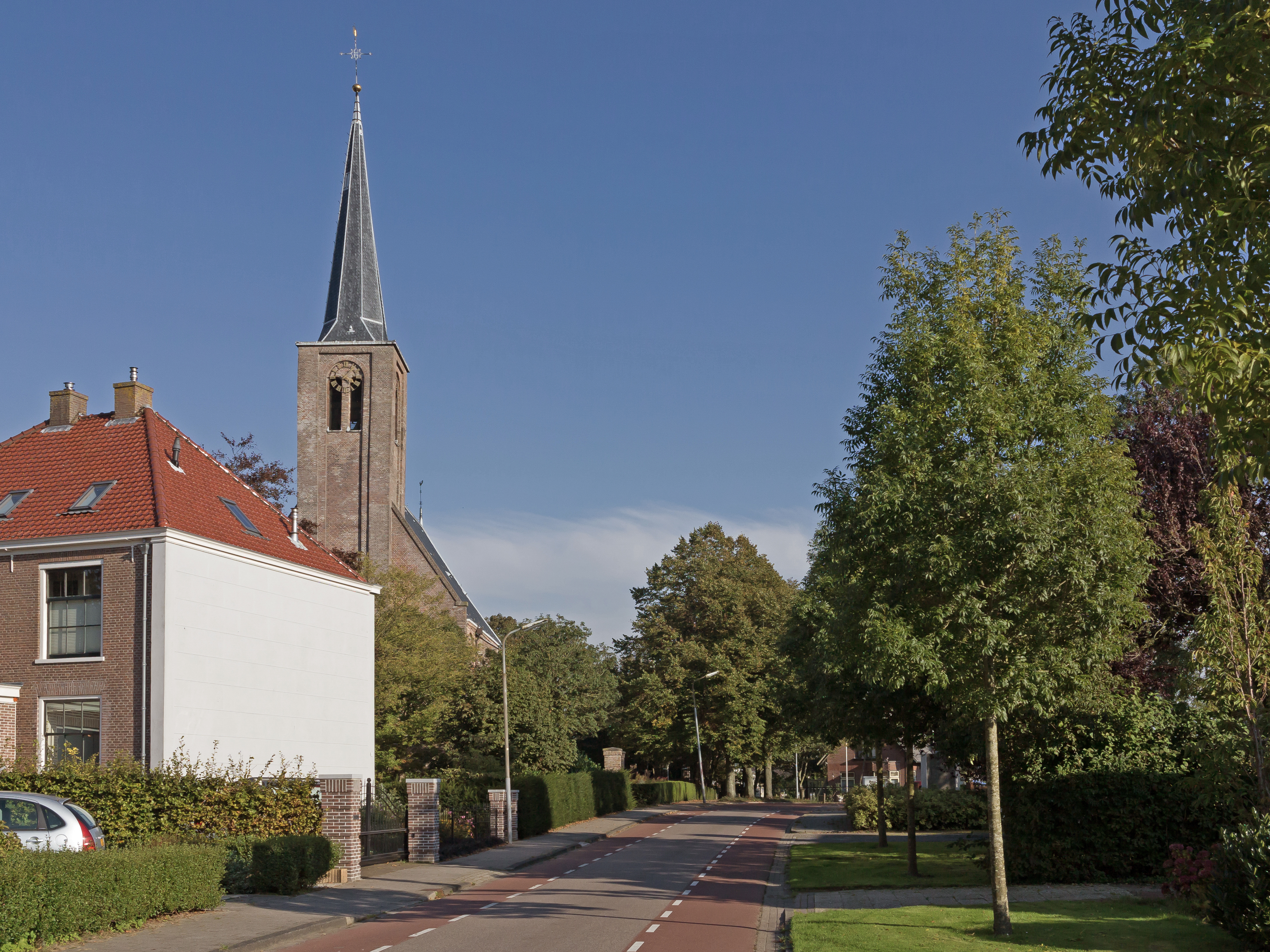
- Village view with church tower

- Coat of arms

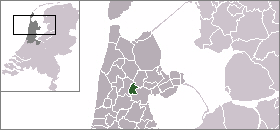

- The village centre (dark green) and the statistical district (light green) of Hensbroek in the municipality of Obdam.

- Location in the Netherlands Location in the province of North Holland in the Netherlands
- Coordinates: 52°39′N 4°53′E
- Country: Netherlands
- Province: North Holland
- Municipality: Koggenland

Area
  - Total: 5.55 km^{2} (2.14 sq mi)
- Elevation: −0.7 m (−2.3 ft)

Population (2025)
  - Total: 1,365
  - Density: 246/km^{2} (637/sq mi)
- Time zone: UTC+1 (CET)
  - Summer (DST): UTC+2 (CEST)
- Postal code: 1711
- Dialing code: 0226

Hensbroek is a village in the Dutch province of North Holland. It is a part of the municipality of Koggenland, and lies about 4 km east of Heerhugowaard.

== Overview ==
The village was first mentioned around 1312 as Hensbroec, and means "swampy land belonging to Hen (person)". Hensbroek developed in the Late Middle Ages after a peat excavation settlement to the west had been abandoned. The village burnt down in 1648.

The Dutch Reformed church is a single aisled church with needle spire which was built between 1657 and 1658, because the medieval church had burnt down in 1579. The polder mill was built in 1866. In 1908, it was decommissioned after a pumping station was installed, but returned to service in 1934 when the pumping station became defective, and stayed on duty until 1948 when a new Diesel powered pumping station was operational. The wind mill is still frequently in service on a voluntary basis.

Hensbroek was home to 324 people in 1840. It was a separate municipality between 1817 and 1979, when it was merged with Obdam. In 2007, it became part of the municipality of Koggenland.

The municipal coat of arms^{(nl)} (introduced 1817) is canting, representing a folk etymology of the name amounting to an interpretation of "hen's breeches". The actual etymology of the broek element is "brook", not "breeches", but its interpretation as "breeches" has a precedent in classical heraldry in the coat of arms of Abbenbroek as shown in the Beyeren Armorial (c. 1405, fol. 39v).

== Gallery ==
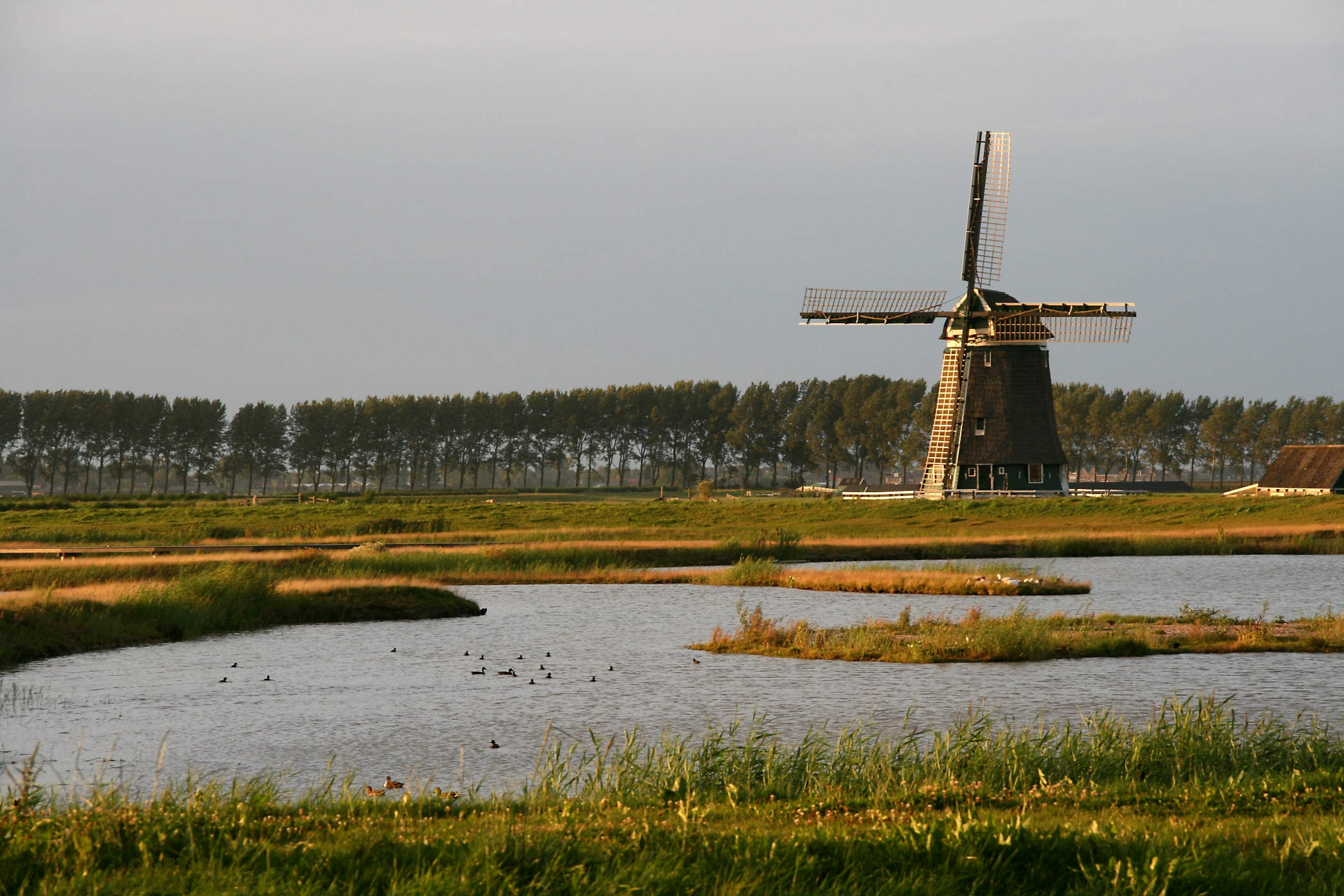
Wind mill Nieuw Leven
