= Bernard Claesen Speirdyke =

Bernard Speirdyke
- Born: Netherlands
- Died: 1670 near Manzanillo, Cuba
- Piratical career
- Nickname: Barnard Speirdyke; Bart Speirdyke
- Type: Buccaneer
- Allegiance: Netherlands
- Years active: 1663-1670
- Rank: Captain
- Base of operations: Port Royal
- Commands: Mary and Jane

Bernard Claesen Speirdyke, also called Barnard or Bart Speirdyke, (fl. 1663–1670) was a 17th-century Dutch buccaneer. His Dutch name Bernard Claesen Spierdijk suggests he may have come from the village of Spierdijk, North Holland.

Commander of the 18-gun Mary and Jane, he was a longtime privateer active in Cuba throughout the 1660s and, on his first voyage, successfully attacked and looted the town of San Tomas while sailing along the coast of Venezuela. In early 1670, he set out from Port Royal with letters from Governor Thomas Modyford to the Governor of Cuba "signifying peace between the two nations". As a further show of goodwill, several Spanish prisoners being held in Jamaica were also returned.

However, the Governor of Bayamo was suspicious of his intentions and had an officer search his ship three times looking for evidence of privateering. Having brought a full cargo of European luxury goods, which were in short supply among the local townspeople, Speirdyke soon sold his entire stock. Despite this breach of Spanish law, the governor chose to turn a blind eye.

Setting sail for his return to Jamaica, it was shortly after leaving the harbor that they were hailed by an English ship and asked where they hailed from. When Speirdyke answered Jamaica, the captain revealed himself as Manuel Ribeiro Pardal, a former Portuguese privateer turned pirate hunter, and called upon the elderly Dutchman to defend himself. Pardal opened fire and the two ships began a battle lasting until the evening when it became to dark to see. Speirdyke was outnumbered 18 to 70, however he continued to fight on.

At dawn, he sailed towards Pardal's ship which he and his men boarded. The Dutchmen were said to have fought bravely and during the savage hand-to-hand fighting that followed resulted in one-third of Pardal's crew being killed or wounded. The numbers of the Portuguese eventually overwhelmed Speirdyke and his men. By the time the Dutch surrendered, the Mary and Jane was on fire in two places and five men had been killed, including Speirdyke. Sending nine of the survivors back with a message to Modyford of his commission and his intentions of retaliation for the raid of Portobello two years before, he took the remaining four with him as prisoners to Cartagena.
