= Obdam railway station =

Railway station in Obdam, Netherlands

Obdam
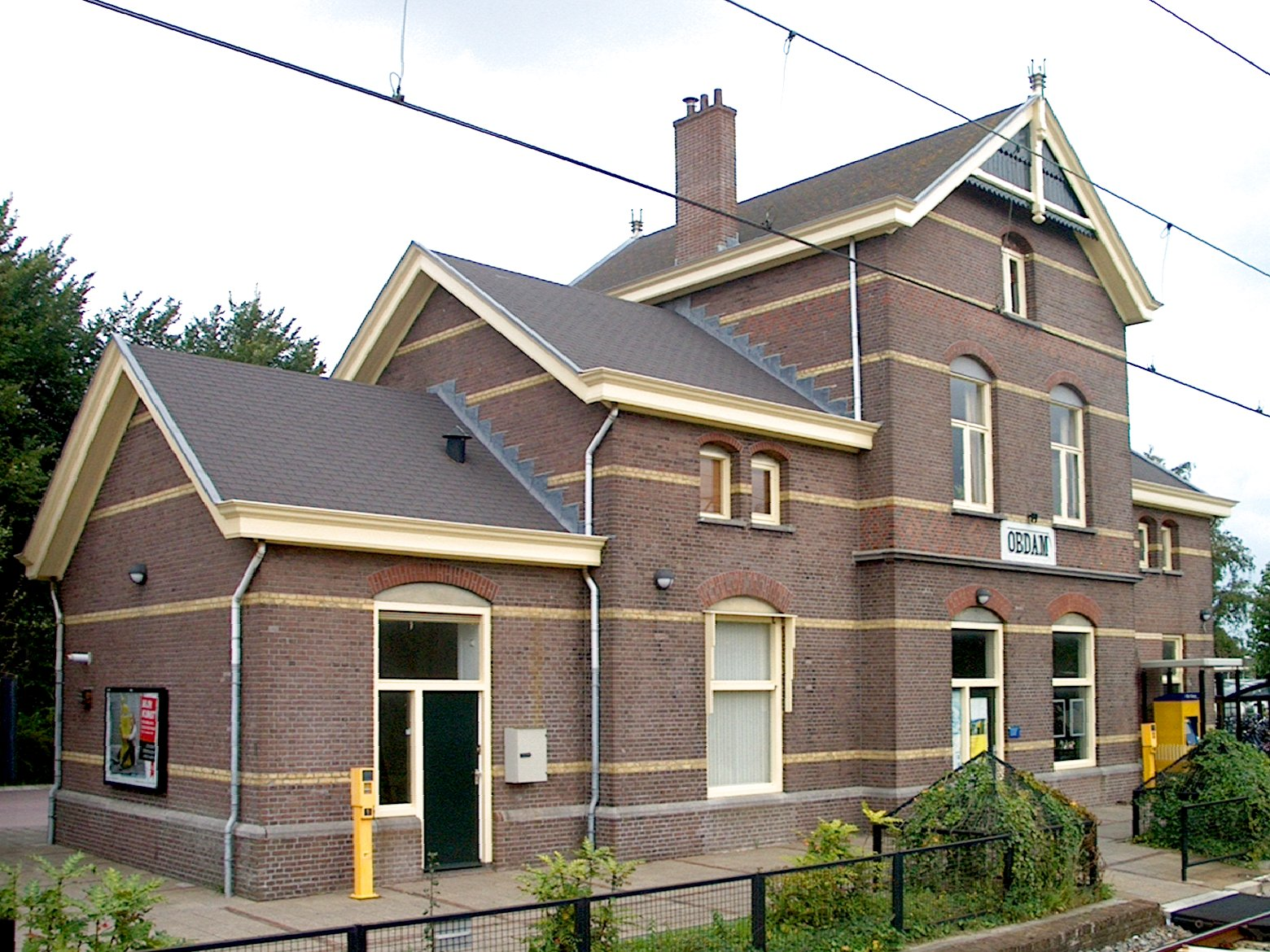

General information
- Location: Obdam, Netherlands
- Coordinates: 52°40′41″N 4°54′30″E
- Line: Heerhugowaard–Hoorn railway
- Platforms: 1 (island platform)
- Tracks: 2

History
- Opened: 1 October 1898; 128 years ago

Services
Preceding station	Nederlandse Spoorwegen	Following station
Hoorn Terminus	NS Sprinter 4800	Heerhugowaard towards Amsterdam Centraal
Location
- Location within Netherlands

Obdam (Dutch pronunciation: [ɔbˈdɑm]) is a railway station in Obdam, Netherlands. It opened in 1898 on the Heerhugowaard–Hoorn railway and is served by Nederlandse Spoorwegen (NS) Sprinter services. There are two tracks at the station, creating a passing loop on the otherwise single-track railway.

== Train services ==
The following services currently call at Obdam:

- 2x per hour local service (sprinter) Hoorn - Alkmaar - Uitgeest - Haarlem - Amsterdam

== Bus services ==
Line	Route
Connexxion
131	Obdam NS - Spanbroek - Opmeer - Hoogwoud
