= Bobeldijk =

- Village
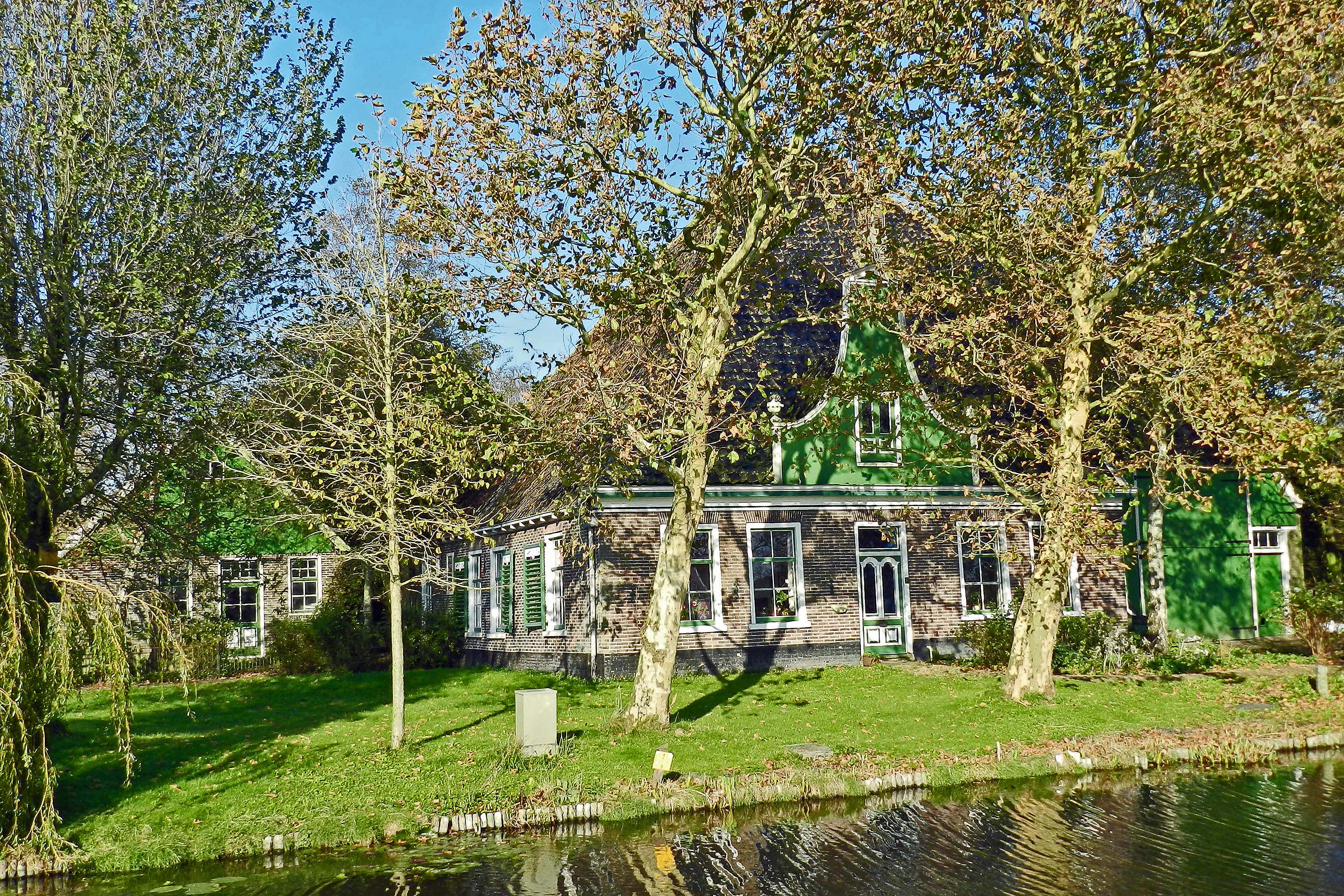
- Farm in Bobeldijk

- Location in the Netherlands Location in the province of North Holland in the Netherlands
- Coordinates: 52°39′13″N 5°0′16″E
- Country: Netherlands
- Province: North Holland
- Municipality: Koggenland

Area
  - Total: 12.71 km^{2} (4.91 sq mi)
- Elevation: −0.8 m (−2.6 ft)

Population (2025)
  - Total: 475
  - Density: 37.4/km^{2} (96.8/sq mi)
- Time zone: UTC+1 (CET)
  - Summer (DST): UTC+2 (CEST)
- Postal code: 1674
- Dialing code: 0227

Bobeldijk is a village in the Dutch province of North Holland. It is a part of the municipality of Koggenland, and lies about 5 km west of Hoorn.

The village was first mentioned in 1450 as "den Boebeldijck", and means "dike with spike rushes (Eleocharis)". Bobeldijk has place name signs. The village was home to 165 people in 1840.
