= Berkmeer =

- Hamlet
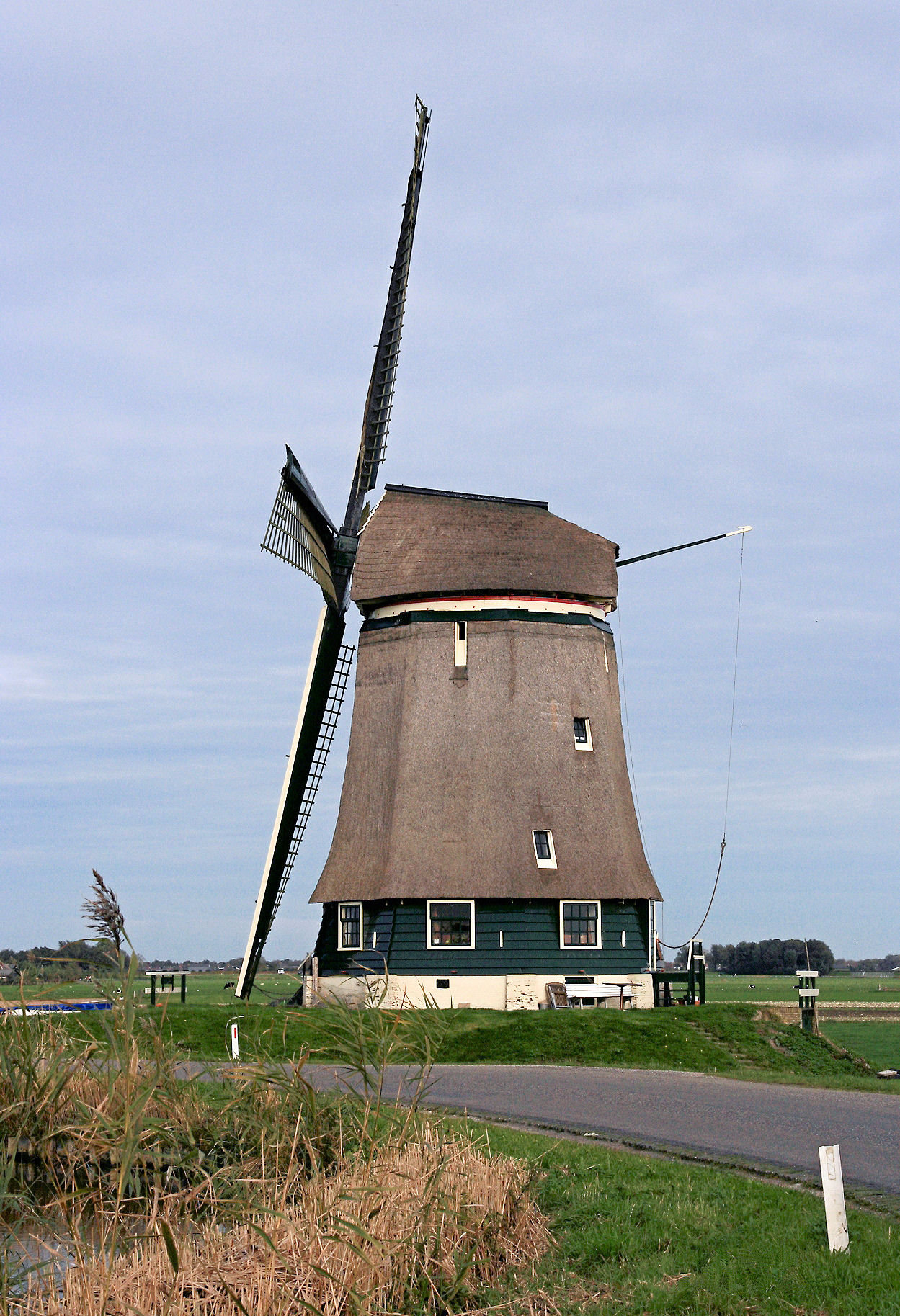
- Wind mill Berkmeermolen

- Location in the Netherlands Location in the province of North Holland in the Netherlands
- Coordinates: 52°41′N 4°54′E
- Country: Netherlands
- Province: North Holland
- Municipality: Koggenland

Area
  - Total: 2.97 km^{2} (1.15 sq mi)
- Elevation: −1.8 m (−5.9 ft)

Population (2021)
  - Total: 110
  - Density: 37/km^{2} (96/sq mi)
- Time zone: UTC+1 (CET)
  - Summer (DST): UTC+2 (CEST)
- Postal code: 1713
- Dialing code: 0226

Berkmeer is a hamlet in the Dutch province of North Holland. It is a part of the municipality of Koggenland, and lies about 5 km east of Heerhugowaard.

The hamlet was first mentioned around 1631 as De Berck meer, and refers to the lake which was poldered in 1636. The name means "birch lake". Berkmeer does not have place name signs. On 28 January 1256, William II of Holland fell through the ice at Berkmeer and was killed by the locals. Berkmeer was home to 141 people in 1840.

The polder mill Berkmeermolen was built around 1608. In 1877, a pumping station was installed next to the wind mill and it was decommissioned in 1925. In 1941, it returned to active service and operated until 1990. The wind mill nowadays functions on a voluntary basis.
