= Rustenburg, North Holland =

Rustenburg
- Village
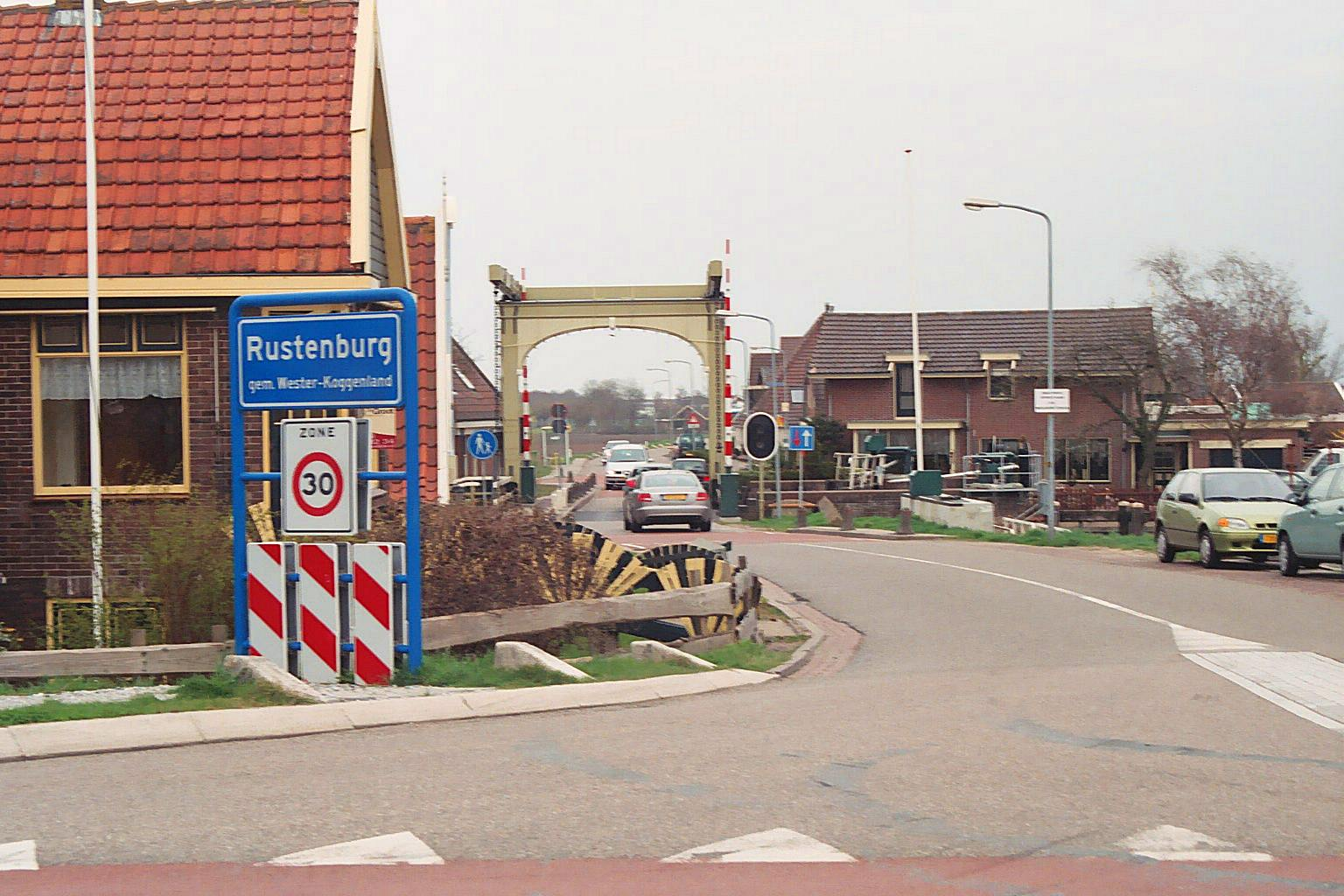

- Location in the Netherlands Location in the province of North Holland in the Netherlands
- Coordinates: 52°38′N 4°53′E
- Country: Netherlands
- Province: North Holland
- Municipality: Koggenland

Area
  - Total: 0.08 km^{2} (0.031 sq mi)
- Elevation: −2.7 m (−8.9 ft)

Population (2025)
  - Total: 155
  - Density: 1,900/km^{2} (5,000/sq mi)
- Time zone: UTC+1 (CET)
  - Summer (DST): UTC+2 (CEST)
- Postal code: 1645
- Dialing code: 072

Rustenburg is a village in the Dutch province of North Holland. It is a part of the municipality of Koggenland, and lies close to Ursem, about 5 km southeast of Heerhugowaard.

The village was first mentioned in 1573 as Rustenburch, and means "quiet castle". It may have been a name of an inn. Rustenburg was home to 167 people in 1840. There are three wind mills in Rustenburg.

== Gallery ==
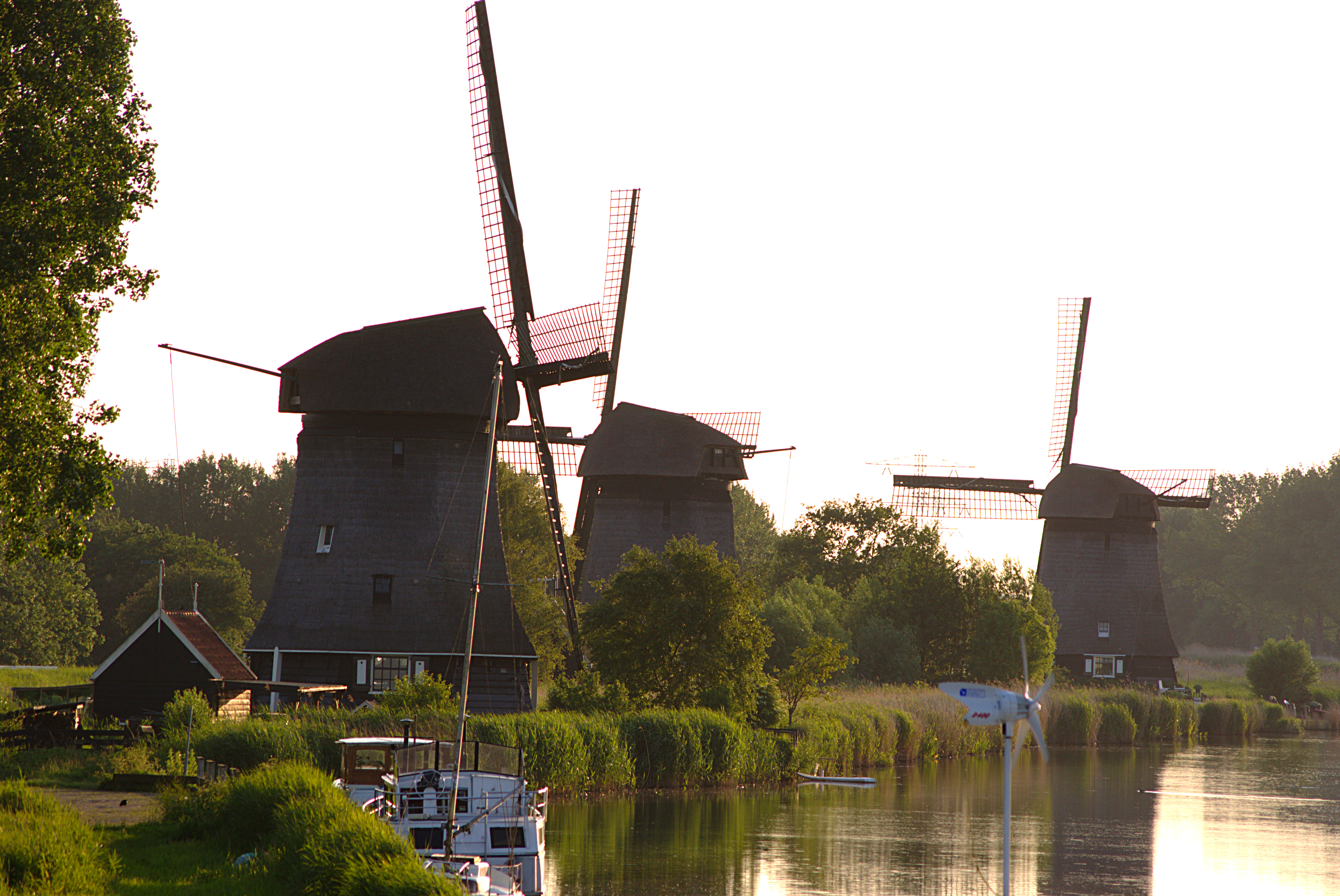
Wind mills
