= Scharwoude, Koggenland =

Scharwoude
- Village
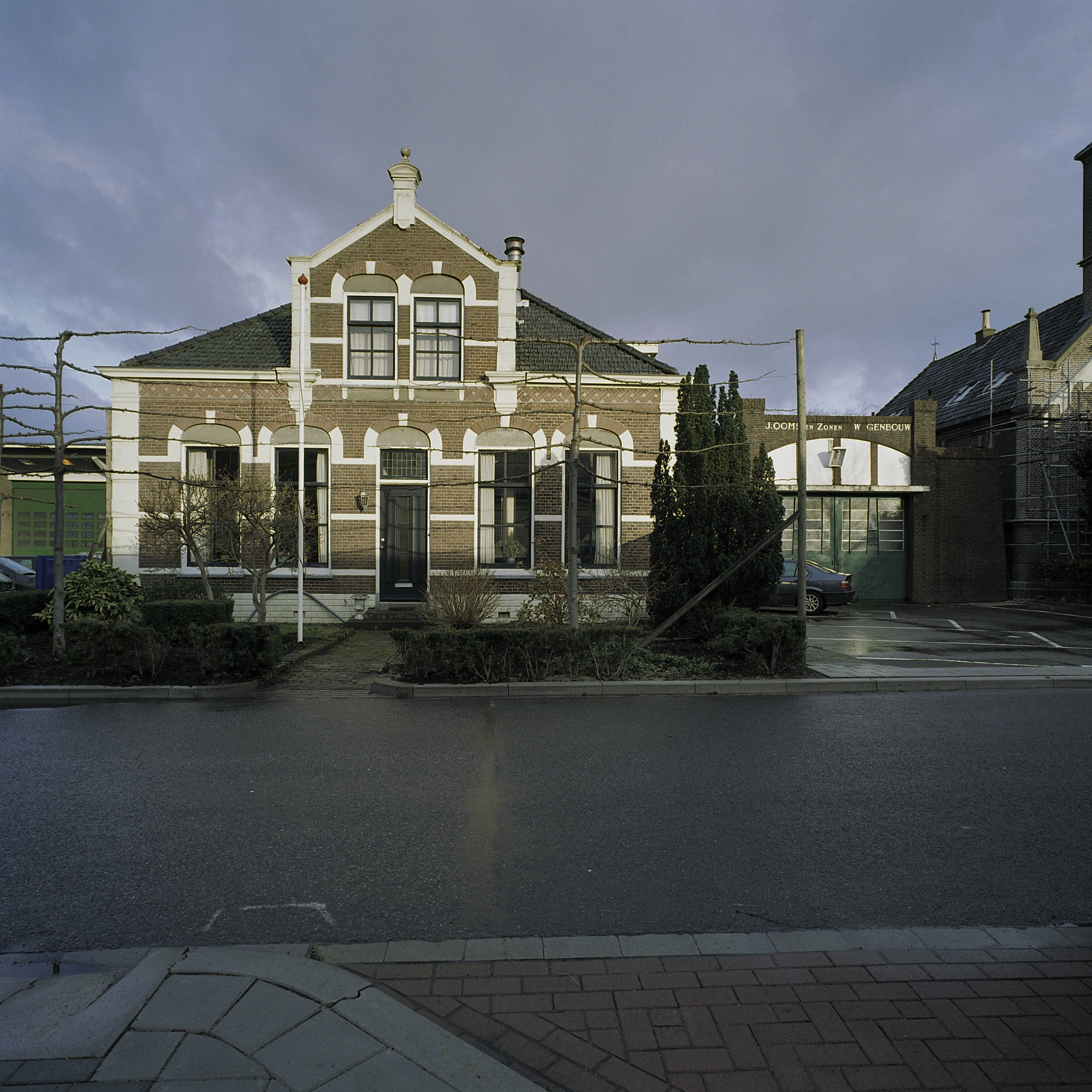
- School with teacher's house

- Location in the Netherlands Location in the province of North Holland in the Netherlands
- Coordinates: 52°37′N 5°1′E
- Country: Netherlands
- Province: North Holland
- Municipality: Koggenland

Area
  - Village: 1.60 km^{2} (0.62 sq mi)
- Elevation: −2.0 m (−6.6 ft)

Population (2025)
  - Village: 540
  - Density: 340/km^{2} (870/sq mi)
  - Urban: 460
  - Rural: 80
- Time zone: UTC+1 (CET)
  - Summer (DST): UTC+2 (CEST)
- Postal code: 1634
- Dialing code: 0229

Scharwoude is a village in the Dutch province of North Holland. It is a part of the municipality of Koggenland, and lies about 5 km southwest of Hoorn.

The village was first mentioned around 1312 as Scaderwoude. The etymology is unclear. Scharwoude often experienced floods due to its proximity to the former Zuiderzee. It was flooded in 1375. The current shape of the dike and the village date from 1854. The former church dates from 1892. It was decommissioned in 1986, and is now a residential home.

== Gallery ==
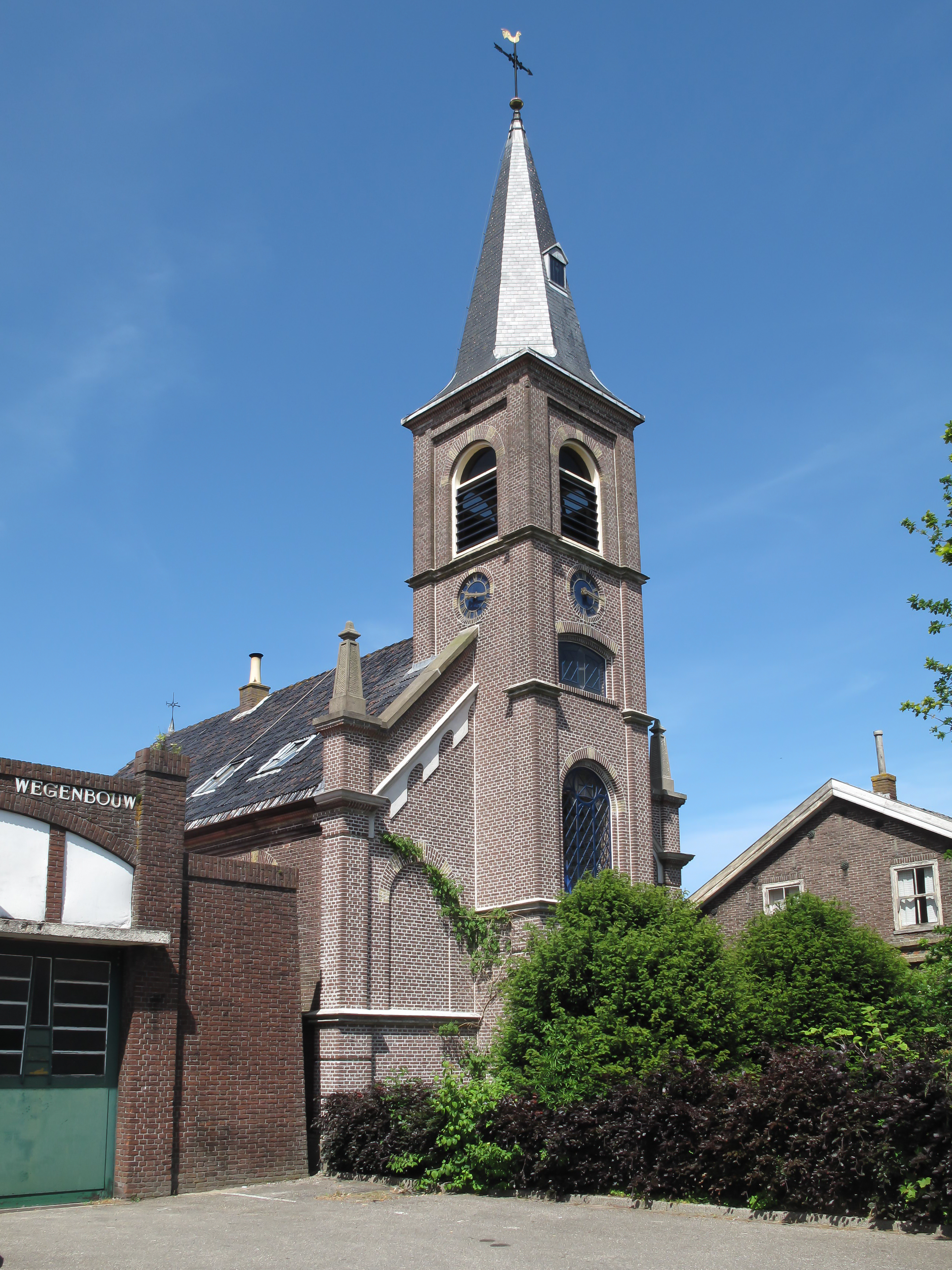
Scharwoude, church

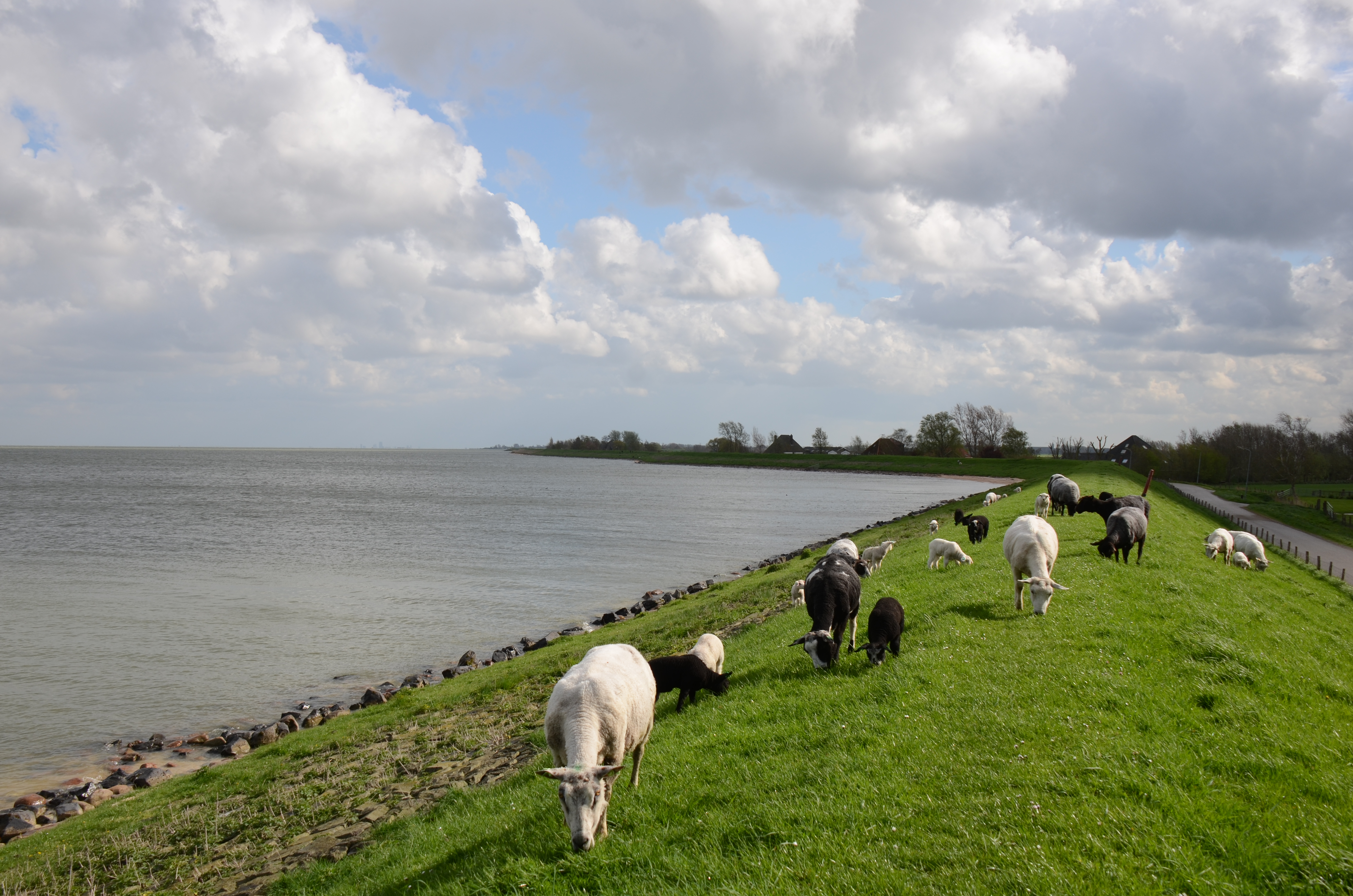
Dike with sheep
