= Avenhorn =

- Village
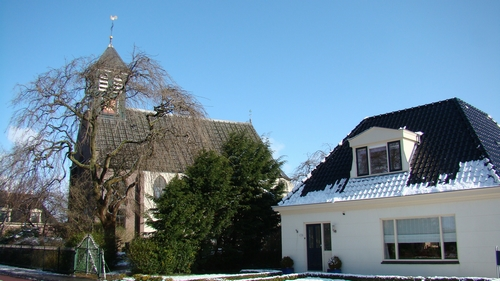

- Coat of arms

- Location in the Netherlands Location in the province of North Holland in the Netherlands
- Coordinates: 52°37′N 4°57′E
- Country: Netherlands
- Province: North Holland
- Municipality: Koggenland

Area
  - Village: 4.73 km^{2} (1.83 sq mi)
- Elevation: −2.1 m (−6.9 ft)

Population (2025)
  - Village: 3,045
  - Density: 644/km^{2} (1,670/sq mi)
  - Urban: 2,945
  - Rural: 100
- Time zone: UTC+1 (CET)
  - Summer (DST): UTC+2 (CEST)
- Postal code: 1633
- Dialing code: 0229

Avenhorn is a village in the Dutch province of North Holland. It is a part of the municipality of Koggenland, and lies about 9 km west of Hoorn.

== History ==
The village was first mentioned around 1312 as Lutekedrecht. The current name means "corner (of a dike) of Ave (person)". Avenhorn developed in the 13th century as a peat excavation settlement.

The Dutch Reformed church is a single aisled church from 1642. In 1914, a ridge turret was added to the church.

Avenhorn was home to 364 people in 1840. In 1884, a railway station was opened on the Zaandam to Enkhuizen railway line. It closed in 1940. In 1979, the former municipality of Avenhorn merged into the new municipality of Wester-Koggenland. In 2007, it became part of the municipality of Koggenland.

== Gallery ==
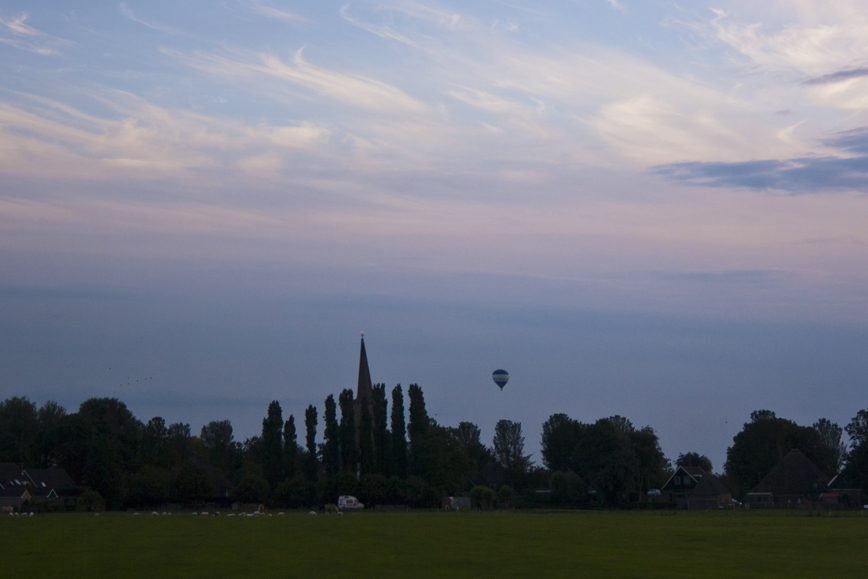
View on Avenhorn

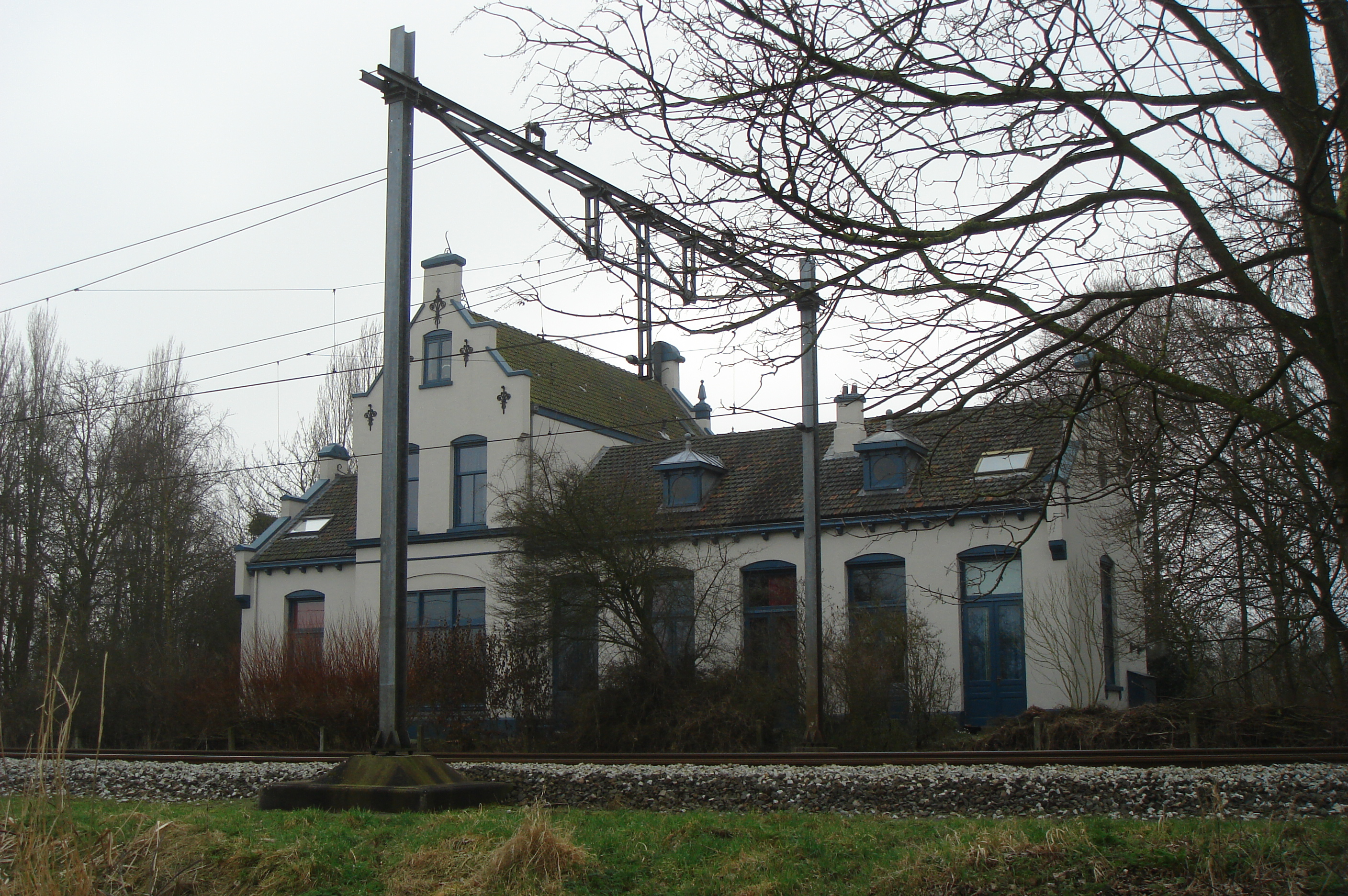
Avenhorn railway station
