= Ursem =

- Village
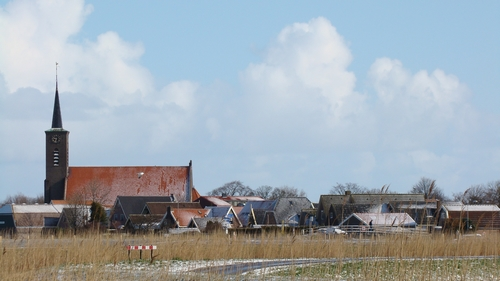

- Coat of arms

- Location in the Netherlands Location in the province of North Holland in the Netherlands
- Coordinates: 52°38′N 4°54′E
- Country: Netherlands
- Province: North Holland
- Municipality: Koggenland; Alkmaar

Area
  - Total: 13.98 km^{2} (5.40 sq mi)
- Elevation: −2.7 m (−8.9 ft)

Population (2025)
  - Total: 2,830
  - Density: 202/km^{2} (524/sq mi)
- Time zone: UTC+1 (CET)
  - Summer (DST): UTC+2 (CEST)
- Postal code: 1645 & 1646
- Dialing code: 072

Ursem is a village in the Dutch province of North Holland. It is a part of the municipality of Koggenland, and lies about 7 kilometres (4.3 mi) east of Alkmaar and 30 kilometres (19 mi) north of Amsterdam and 10 kilometres (6.2 mi) west from Hoorn. A part of the village is located in the municipality of Alkmaar.

== History ==
The village was first mentioned in the first half of the 11th century as Urisheim, and means "settlement of Uri (person)". Ursem developed in the 11th century as a peat excavation settlement. It used to be concentrated around the church, but moved southwards towards the dike.

The Dutch Reformed church is an aisleless church with wooden ridge turret. It was built between 1846 and 1847 to replace a 1659 church. The Catholic St Bavo church is a three aisled church with a lean tower and was built between 1920 and 1921 to replace its 1856 predecessor.

Ursem was home to 268 people in 1840. Ursem was a separate municipality until 1979, when the new municipality of Wester-Koggenland was created.

== Gallery ==
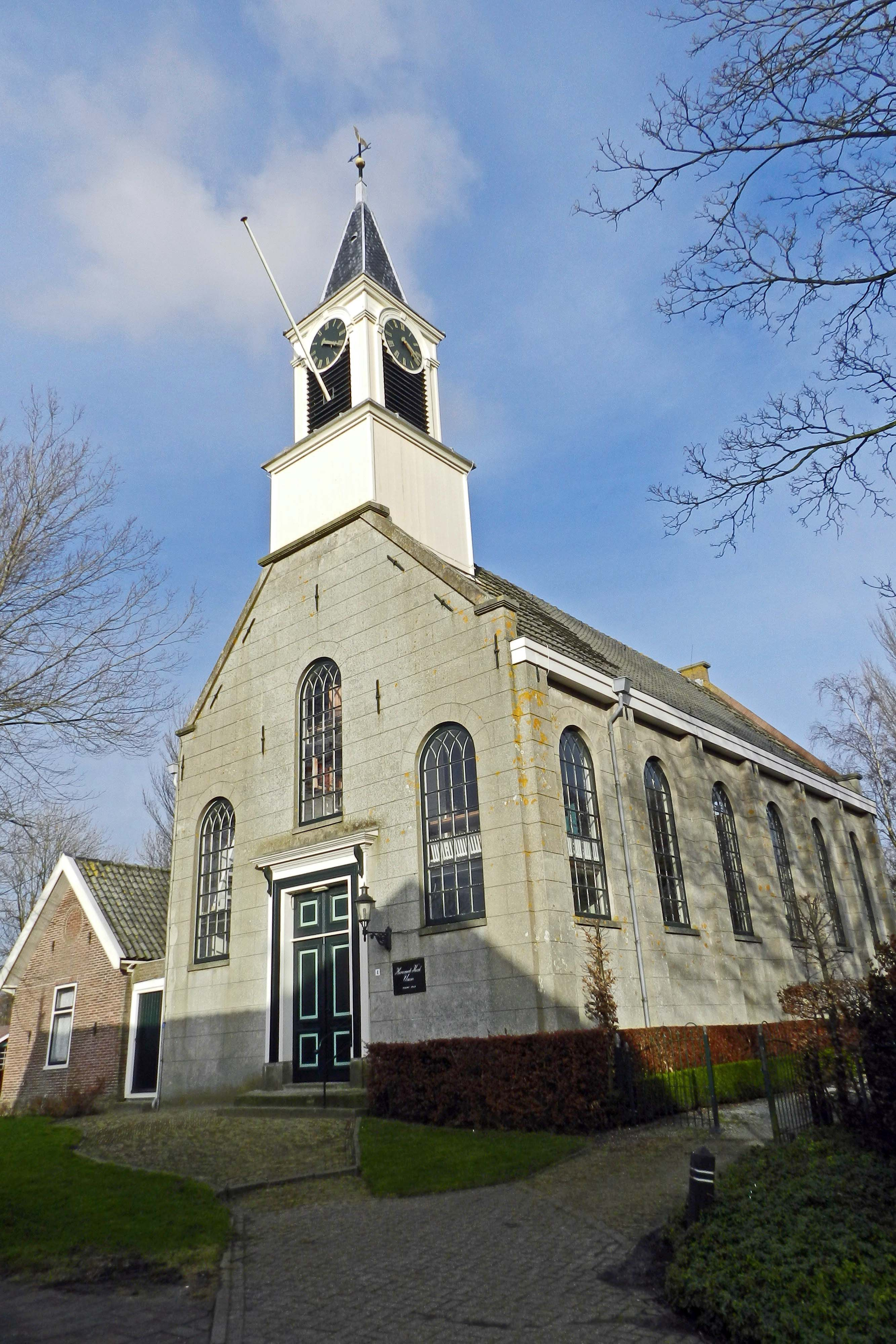
Dutch Reformed Church

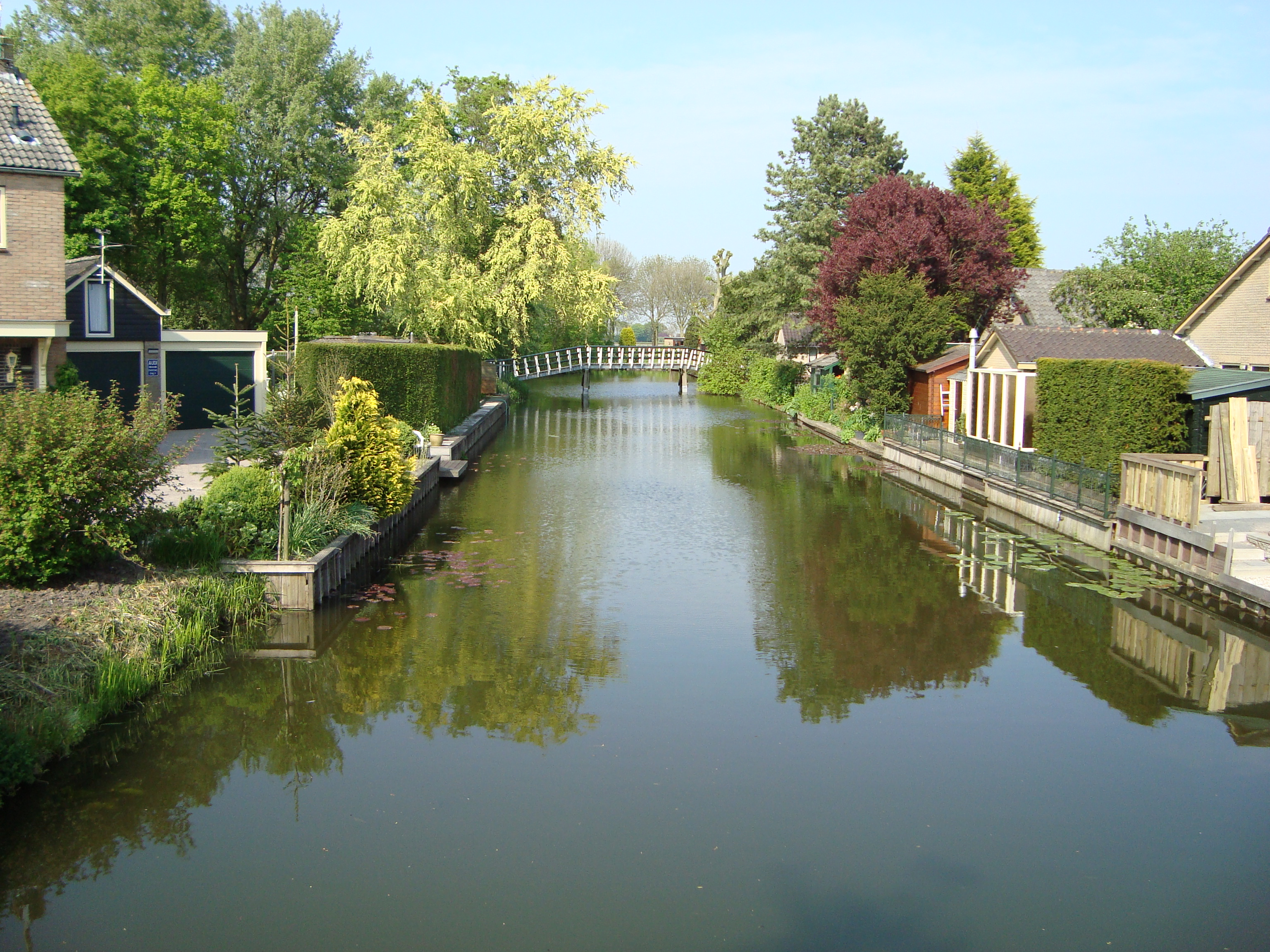
Canal view

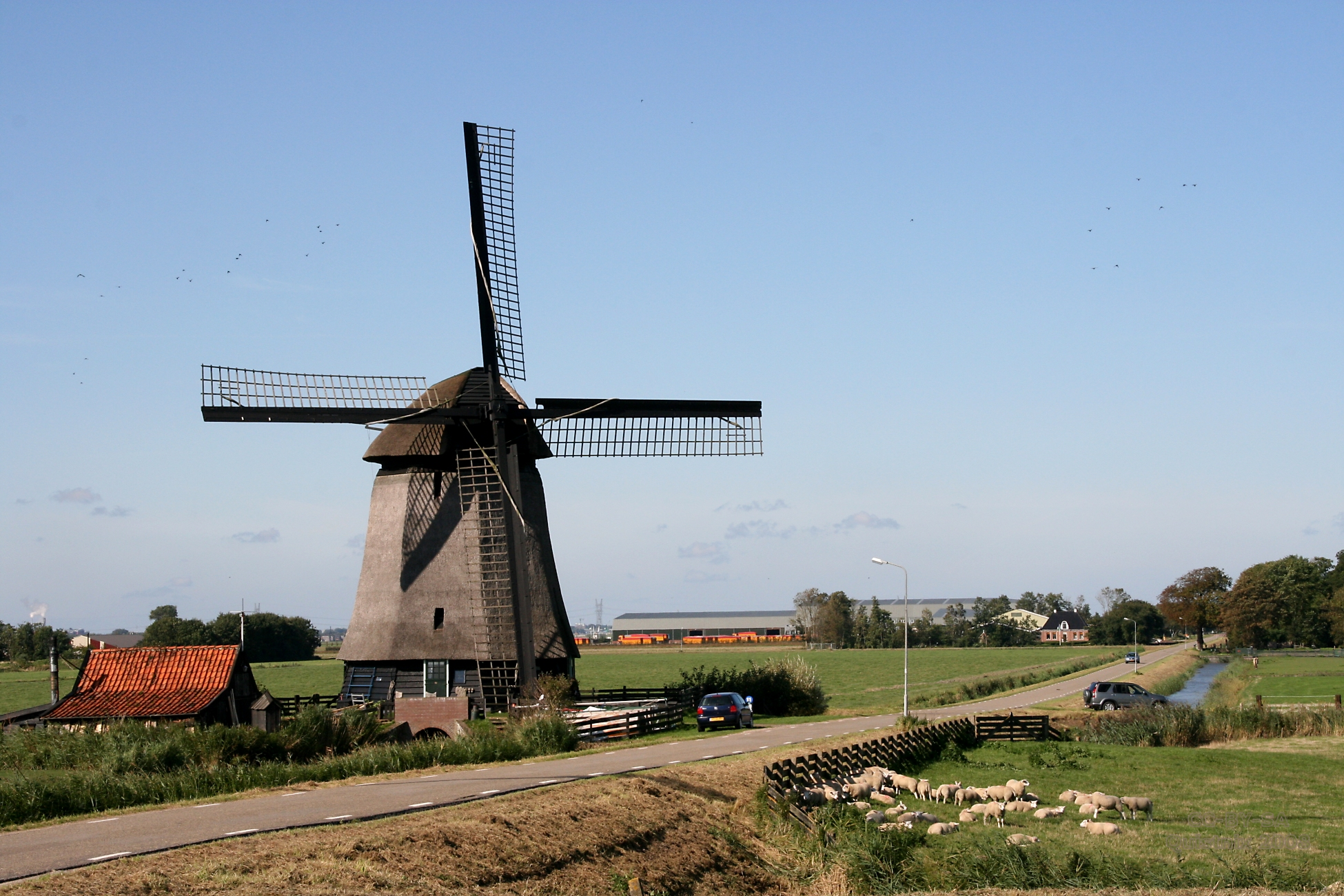
Windmill Ondermolen O

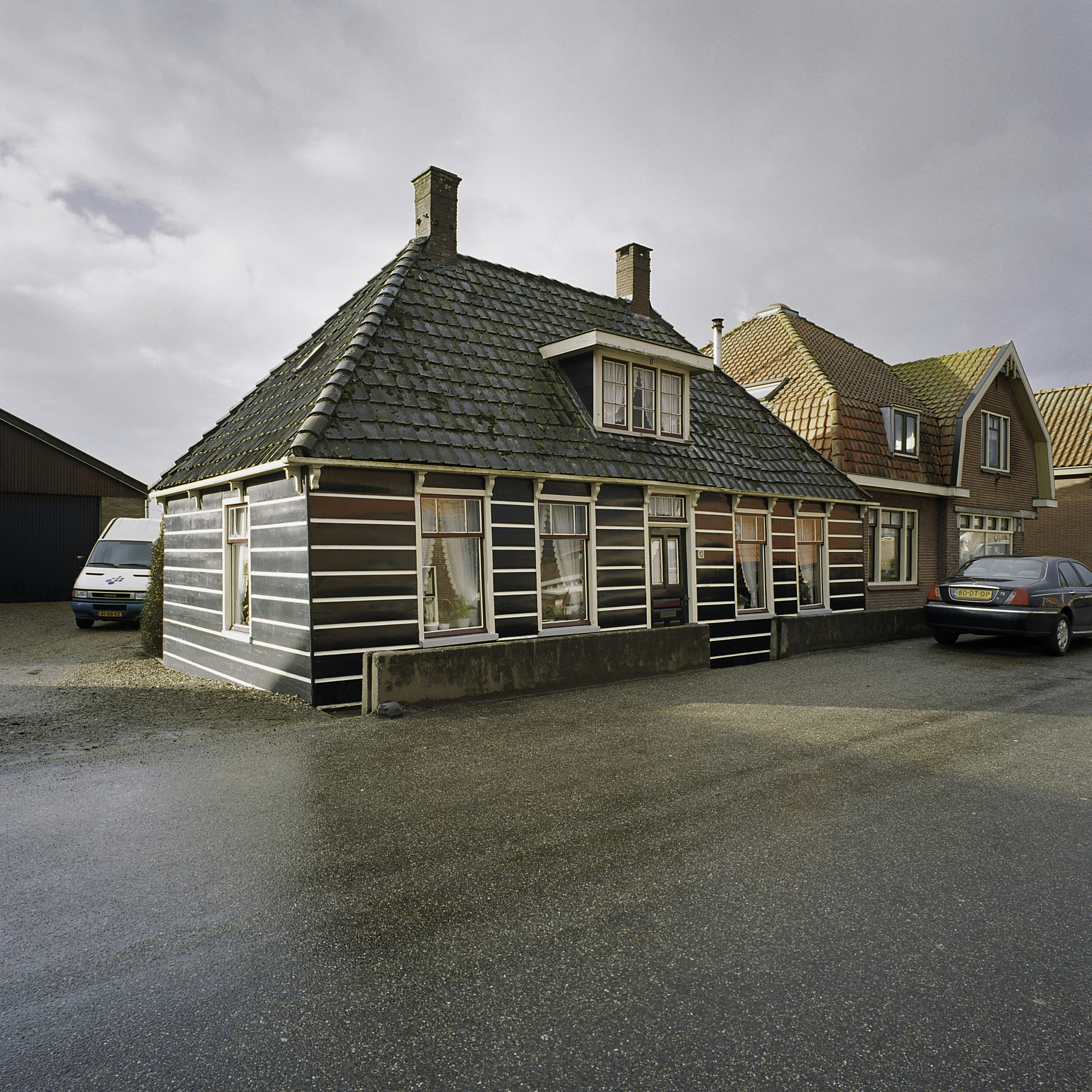
Wooden dike house
