= De Goorn =

- Village
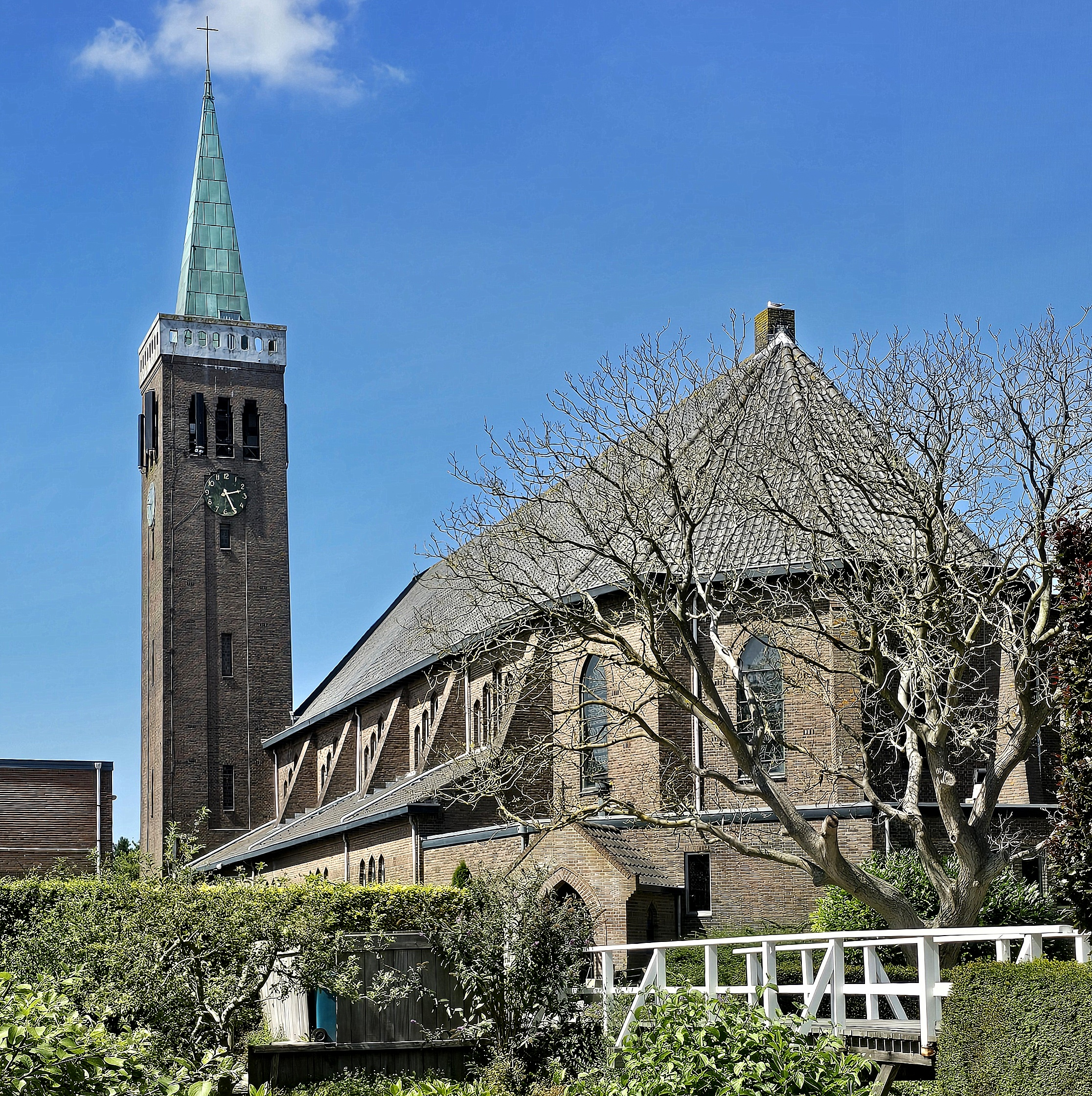

- Location in the Netherlands Location in the province of North Holland in the Netherlands
- Coordinates: 52°37′49″N 4°56′40″E
- Country: Netherlands
- Province: North Holland
- Municipality: Koggenland

Area
  - Village: 3.52 km^{2} (1.36 sq mi)
- Elevation: −2.3 m (−7.5 ft)

Population (2025)
  - Village: 3,845
  - Density: 1,090/km^{2} (2,830/sq mi)
  - Urban: 3,720
  - Rural: 125
- Time zone: UTC+1 (CET)
  - Summer (DST): UTC+2 (CEST)
- Postal code: 1648
- Dialing code: 0229

De Goorn is a village in the Dutch province of North Holland. It is a part of the municipality of Koggenland, and lies about 9 km west of Hoorn.

The village was first mentioned around 1312 as "den Gore", and means "swampy forest ground". De Goorn was home to 98 people in 1840. In 1930, the Catholic Our Lady of the Holy Rosary Church was built by Joseph Cuypers and his son Pierre jr.

== Gallery ==
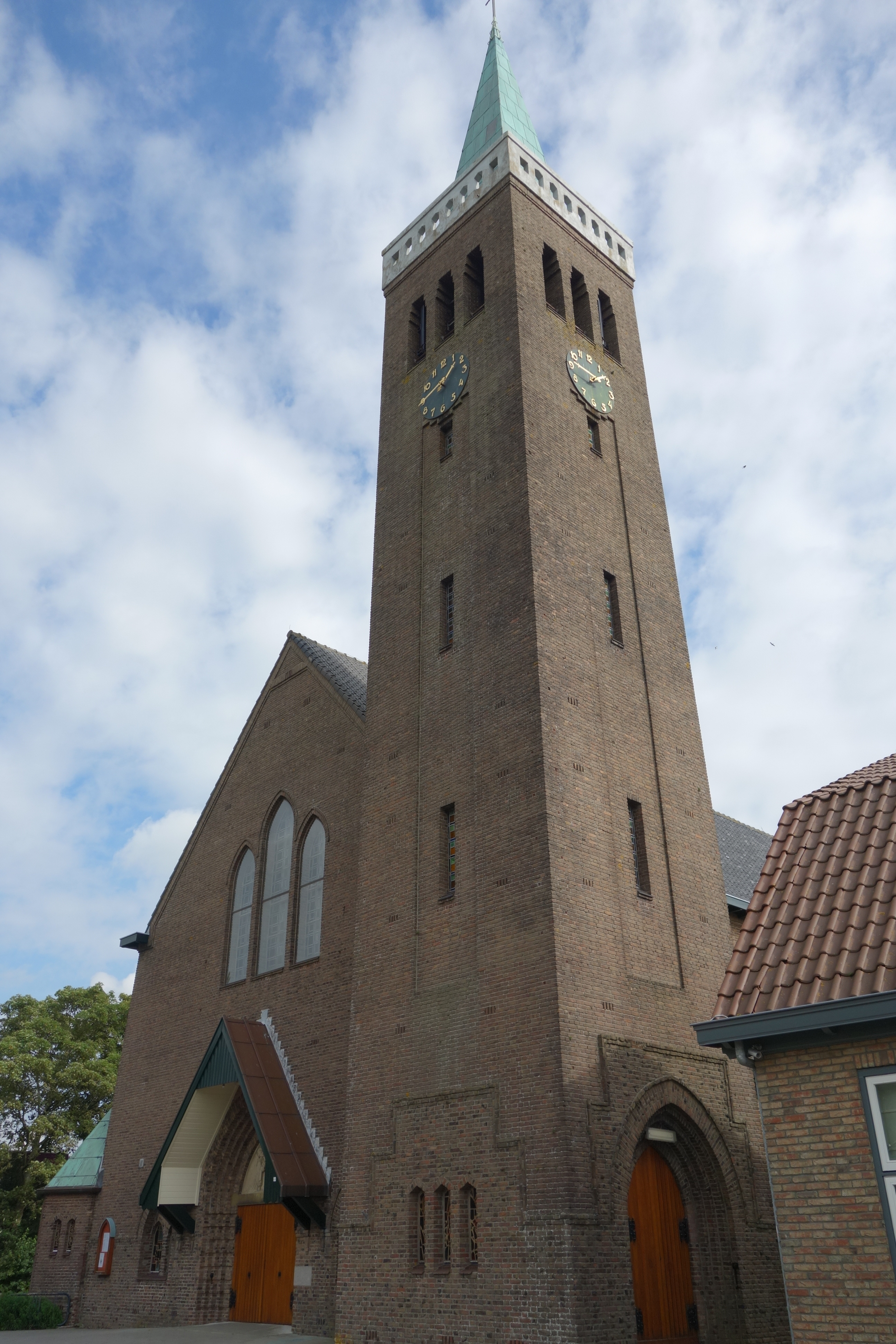
Our Lady of the Holy Rosary Church

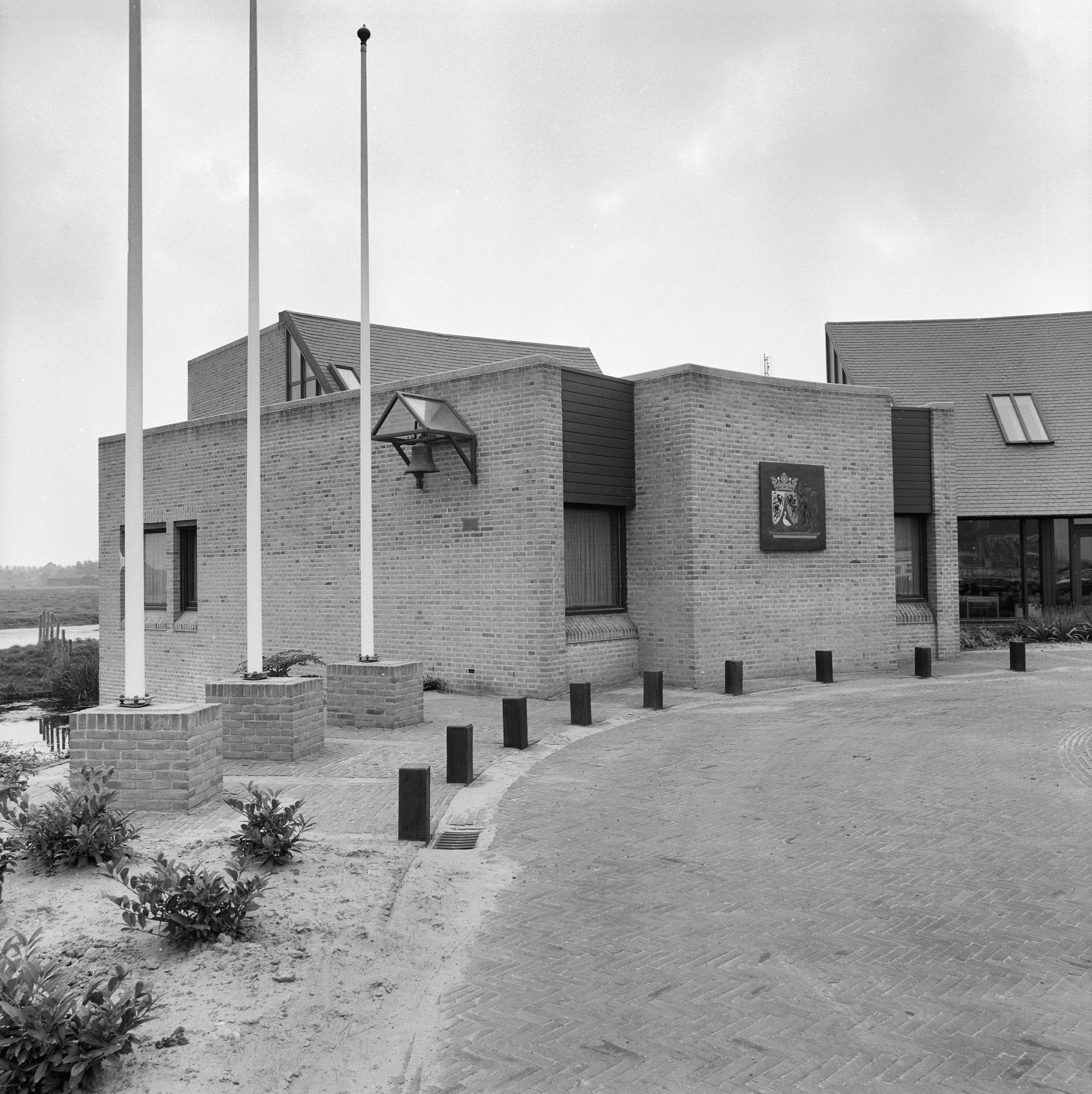
Former town hall
