= Spierdijk =

- Village
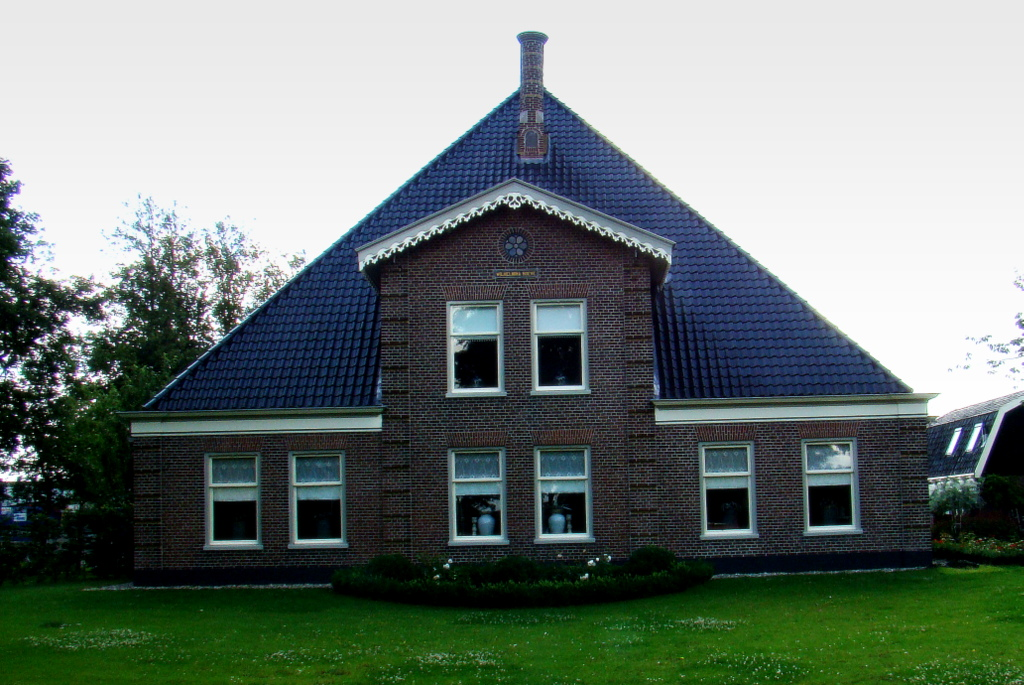
- Farm in Spierdijk

- Location in the Netherlands Location in the province of North Holland in the Netherlands
- Coordinates: 52°39′N 4°57′E
- Country: Netherlands
- Province: North Holland
- Municipality: Koggenland

Area
  - Total: 4.51 km^{2} (1.74 sq mi)
- Elevation: −1.8 m (−5.9 ft)

Population (2025)
  - Total: 1,370
  - Density: 304/km^{2} (787/sq mi)
- Time zone: UTC+1 (CET)
  - Summer (DST): UTC+2 (CEST)
- Postal code: 1641
- Dialing code: 0229

Spierdijk is a village in the Dutch province of North Holland. It is a part of the municipality of Koggenland, and lies about 13 kilometres (8.1 mi) east of Alkmaar.

The village was first mentioned in 1365 as Spierdijck, and is a combination a long reed stick and dike. Spierdijk developed on the edge of the Wogmeer as a peat excavation village.

The Catholic St Georgius Church is a three aisled cruciform church with needle spire which was built between 1849 and 1850.

== Gallery ==
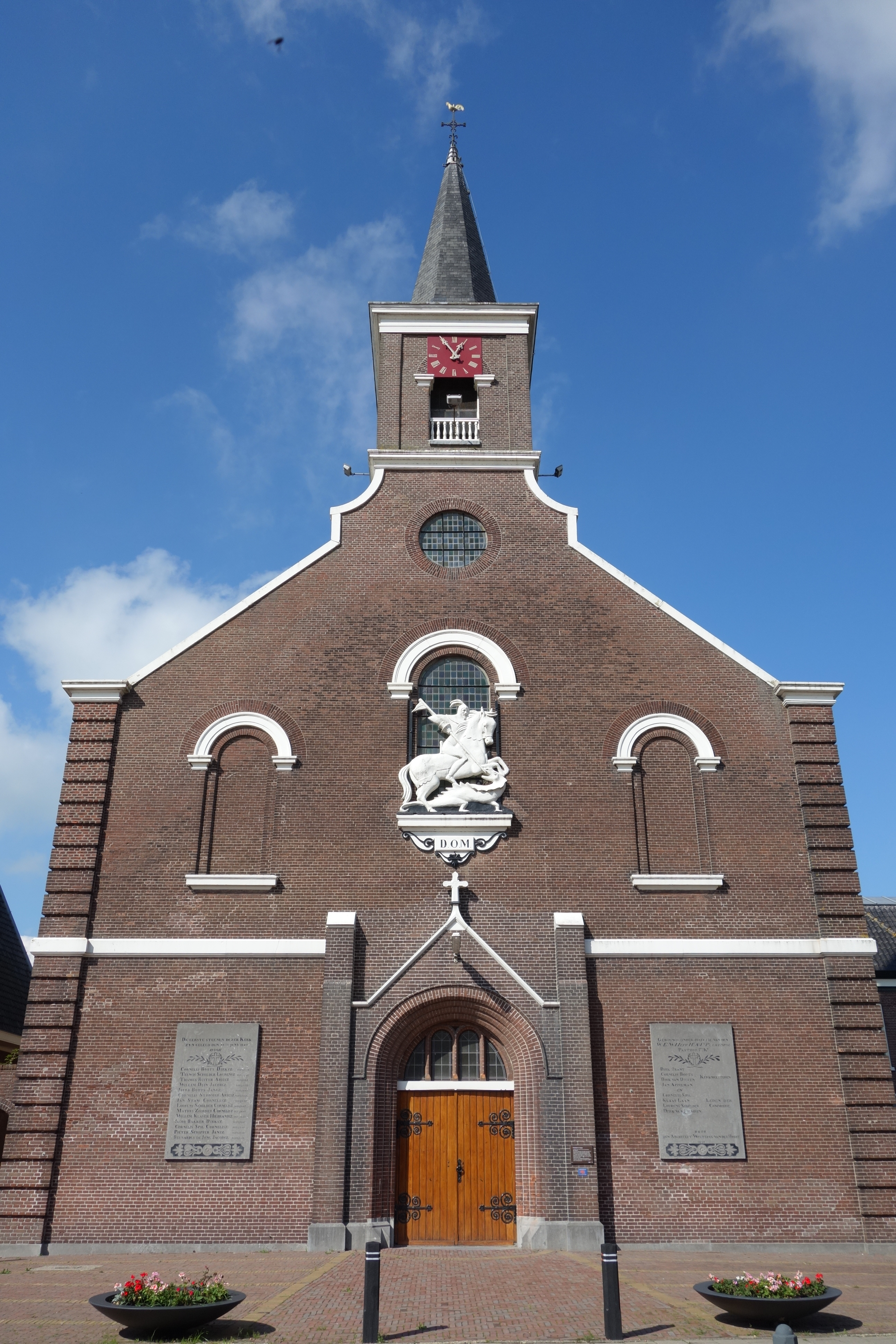
St Georgius Church
