= Haarlem railway station =

Railway station in Haarlem, Netherlands

Haarlem
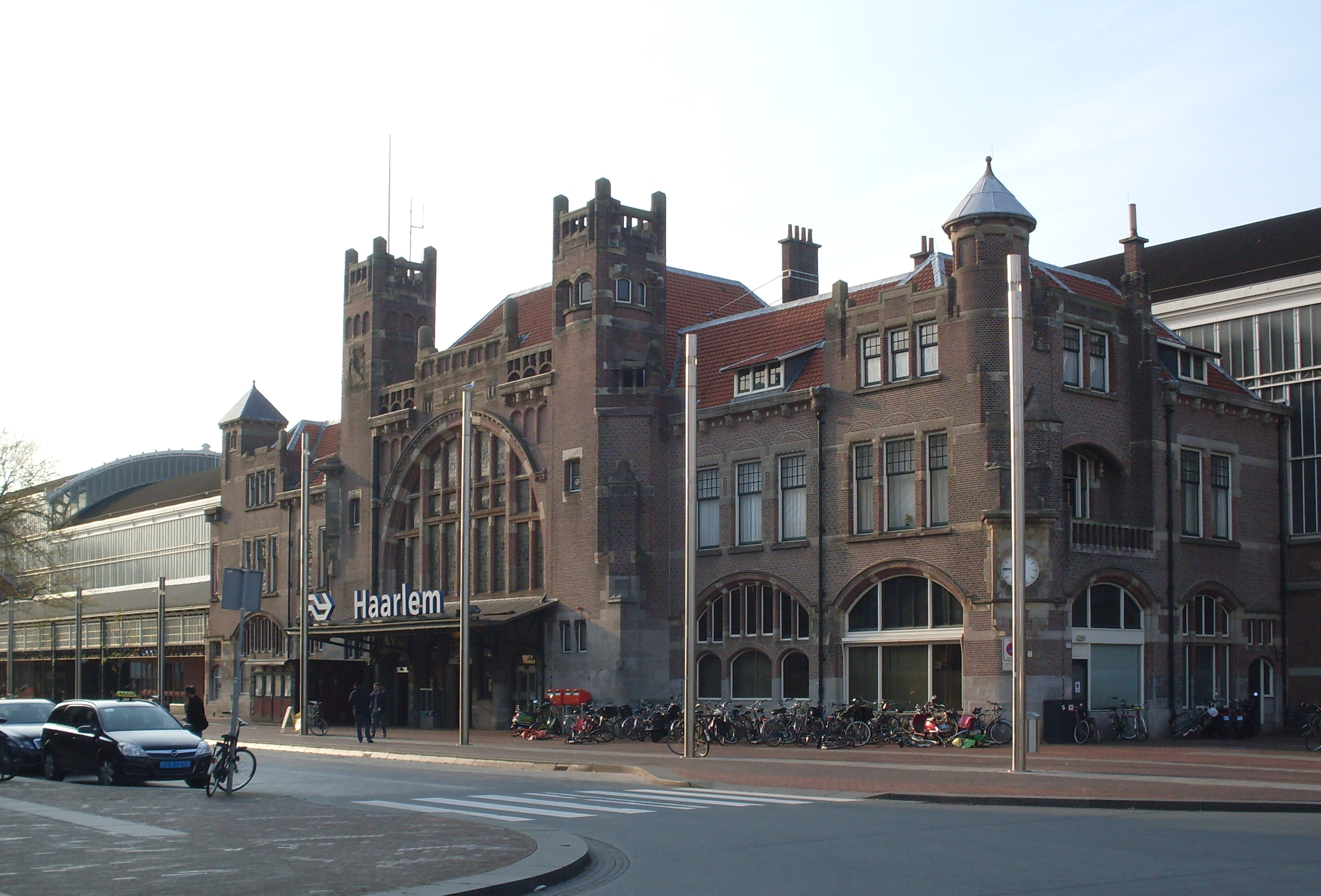
- Main entrance, built in the 1900s

General information
- Location: Haarlem, North Holland; Netherlands
- Coordinates: 52°23′16″N 4°38′20″E
- Operator: Nederlandse Spoorwegen
- Lines: Amsterdam–Rotterdam railway Haarlem–Uitgeest railway Haarlem–Zandvoort railway
- Platforms: 6

Other information
- Station code: Hlm

History
- Opened: 20 September 1839
Services
Preceding station	Nederlandse Spoorwegen	Following station
Heemstede-Aerdenhout towards Den Haag Centraal	NS Intercity 2100	Amsterdam Sloterdijk towards Amsterdam Centraal
Heemstede-Aerdenhout towards Vlissingen	NS Intercity 2200	Amsterdam Sloterdijk towards Amsterdam Centraal
Heemstede-Aerdenhout towards Vlissingen	NS Intercity 2300 Mon-Fri until 20:00	Amsterdam Sloterdijk towards Amsterdam Centraal
Terminus	NS Nachtnet 21460 Fri, Sat night only	Amsterdam Centraal Terminus
Bloemendaal towards Hoorn	NS Sprinter 4800	Haarlem Spaarnwoude towards Amsterdam Centraal
Overveen towards Zandvoort	NS Sprinter 5400	Haarlem Spaarnwoude towards Amsterdam Centraal
Heemstede-Aerdenhout towards Den Haag Centraal	NS Sprinter 6300	Terminus
Location
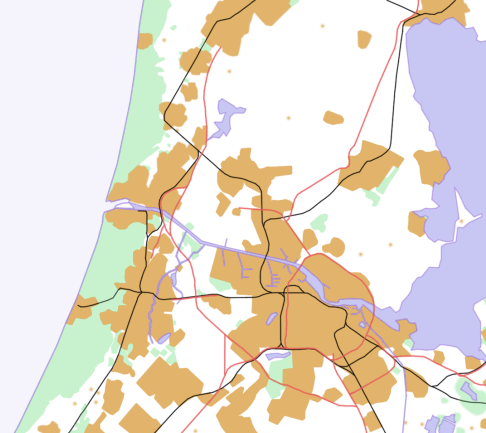
- Location within Northern Randstad Location within Netherlands

Haarlem railway station is located in Haarlem in North Holland, Netherlands. The station opened at September 20, 1839, on the Amsterdam–Rotterdam railway, the first railway line in the Netherlands. The station building itself is a rijksmonument.

== History ==
The original, wooden station was built on the Oude Weg, just outside the Amsterdamse Poort in 1839 to accommodate the passengers of the first railway in the Netherlands between Haarlem and Amsterdam. This had a broad gauge rail width of the Dutch broad gauge 1,945 mm (6 ft 4 9/16 in). The station was built outside the city, on the current location of the Centrale Werkplaats (maintenance depot) of the Hollandsche IJzeren Spoorweg-Maatschappij.

At great expense, the track gauge was reduced in 1866 to 1,435 mm (4 ft 8 1/2 in) in order to conform to George Stephenson's standard gauge. The train engine "De Snelheid" was the twin of the "Arend", which along with the carriages, were designed by Stephenson's apprentice, the English rail engineer Thomas Longridge Gooch of R.B. Longridge & Co. There were 4 trains per day to Amsterdam, scheduled at 9:00, 14:00, 16:00, and 18:00. The prices of the tickets for 1st (closed carriage), 2nd, and 3rd class (charabanc) were 1.20, 80c, and 40c (guilders).

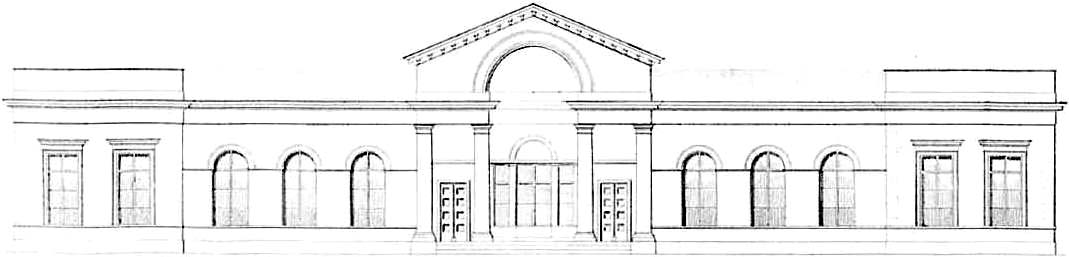
1842 neo-classical station by F.W. Conrad.

Within a few years the new railway turned out to be a great success, and in 1842 a permanent station was built on the current location. It was designed by Frederick Willem Conrad in a semi-Greek neo-classicistic style. The front of the building was open to the street.

=== Mouthaan ===
In 1867, the station was re-designed by P.J. Mouthaan. An extra floor was put on the building and the front of the building was enclosed.

=== Current station ===
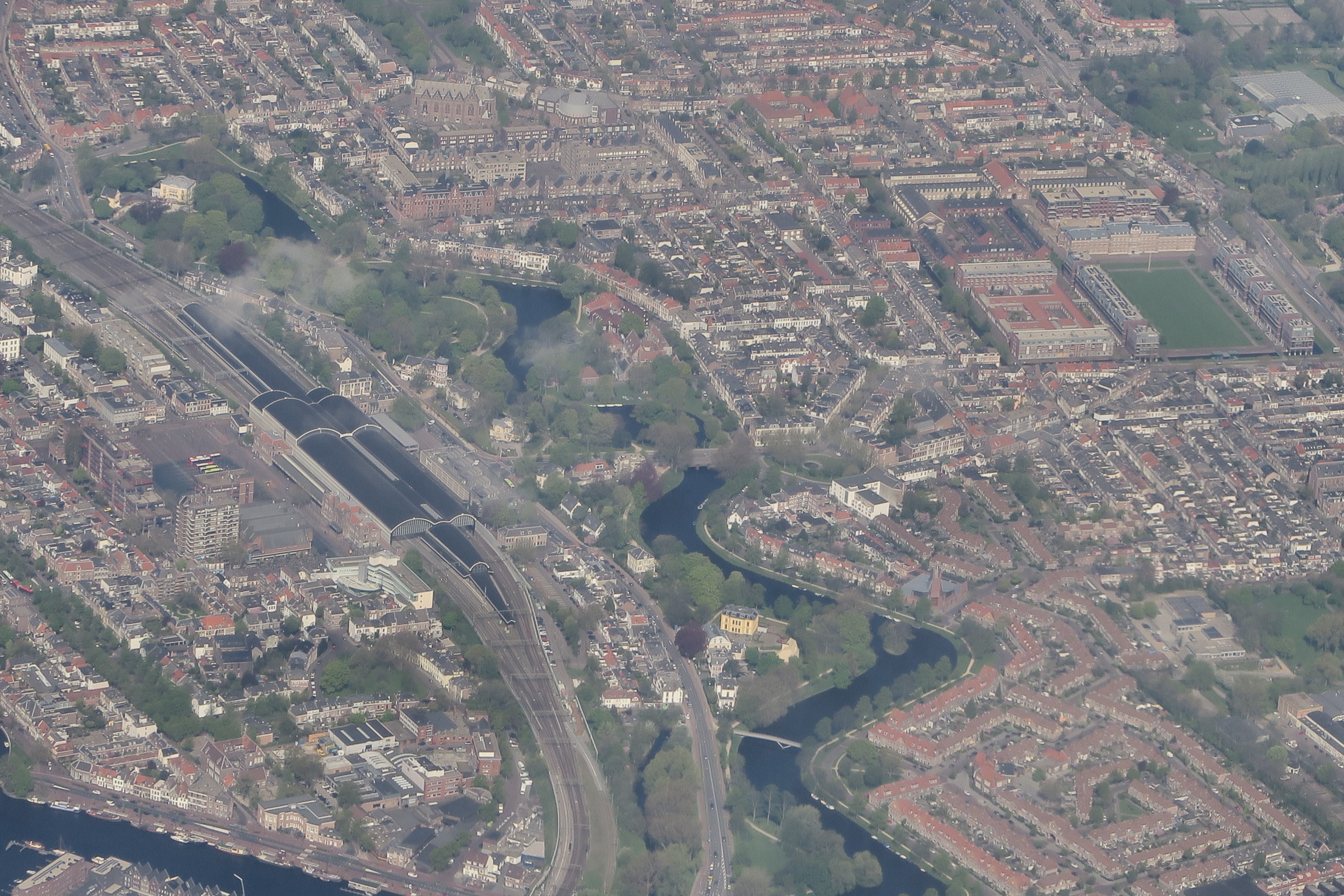
The station from the air

The current building was built between 1906 and 1908. The design is by the railway station specialist Dirk Margadant (1849-1915). The tracks were elevated, to avoid conflict with the traffic in the city. It is the only train station in the Netherlands that is built in Art Nouveau style.

== Train services ==
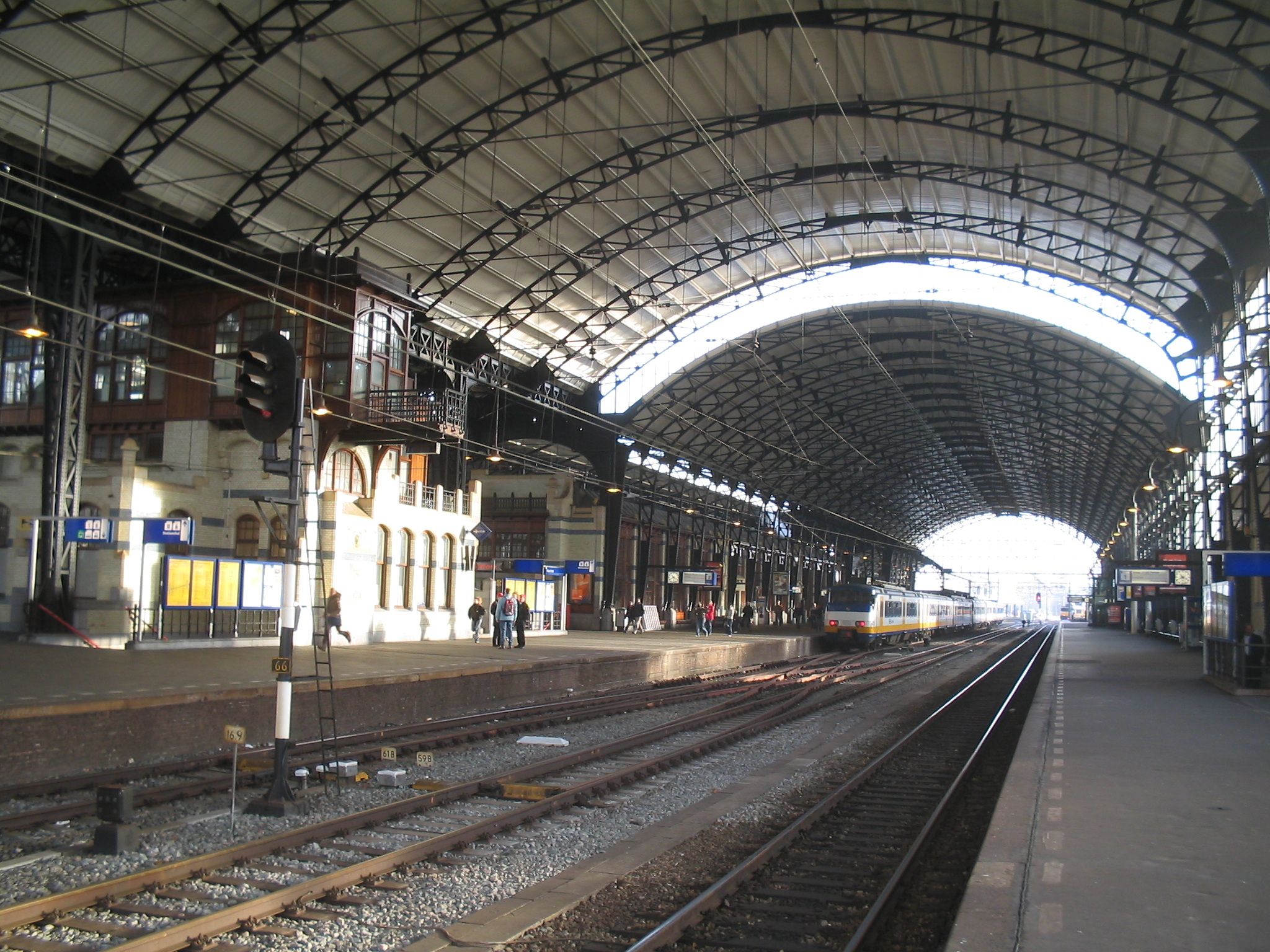
Inside Haarlem station today.

As of 9 December 2018, the following services call at Haarlem:

=== International rail ===
Train	Operator(s)	From	Via	To	Freq.	Service
Alpen Express 1300	Railexpert	Den Haag HS	Leiden Centraal - Haarlem - Amsterdam Centraal - Utrecht Centraal - 's Hertogenbosch - Eindhoven - Venlo - Kufstein - Wörgl hbf - Westendorf - Kirchberg in Tirol - Kitzbühel - St. Johann in Tirol - Fieberbrunn - Saalfelden - Zell am See - Schwarzach-St. Veit - St. Johann im Pongau	Bischofshofen	1/week	Only in service from December up to March and only running on Fridays.
Alpen Express 1300	Railexpert	Den Haag HS	Leiden Centraal - Haarlem - Amsterdam Centraal - Utrecht Centraal - 's Hertogenbosch - Eindhoven - Venlo - Kufstein - Wörgl hbf - Jenbach - Innsbruck hbf - Ötztal - Imst-Pitztal - Landeck-Zams - St. Anton am Arlberg - Langen am Arlberg	Bludenz	1/week	Only in service from December up to March and only running on Fridays.

=== National rail ===
Train	Operator(s)	From	Via	To	Freq.	Service
InterCity 2100	NS	Amsterdam Centraal	Amsterdam Sloterdijk - Haarlem - Heemstede-Aerdenhout - Leiden Centraal	Den Haag Centraal	2/hour	Does not run after 10.00 pm; Also calling at Heemstede-Aerdenhout
InterCity 2200	NS	Amsterdam Centraal	Amsterdam Sloterdijk - Haarlem - Heemstede-Aerdenhout - Leiden Centraal- Den Haag Laan van NOI - Den Haag HS - Delft - Schiedam Centrum - Rotterdam Centraal - Rotterdam Blaak - Dordrecht - Roosendaal - Bergen op Zoom - Rilland-Bath - Krabbendijk - Kruiningen-Yerseke - Kapelle-Biezelinge - Goes - Arnemuiden - Middelburg - Vlissingen Souburg	Vlissingen	2/hour	Also calling at Heemstede-Aerdenhout, Den Haag Laan van NOI, Schiedam Centrum, Rotterdam Blaak, Rilland-Bath, Krabbendijk, Kruiningen-Yerseke, Kapelle-Biezelinge, Arnemuiden and Vlissingen Souburg
InterCity 3400	NS	Haarlem	Beverwijk - Castricum - Heiloo	Alkmaar	2/hour	Peak hours and peak direction only (morning Alkmaar→ Haarlem, evening Haarlem→ Alkmaar); Also calling at Heiloo
Sprinter 4800	NS	Amsterdam Centraal	Amsterdam Sloterdijk - Halfweg-Zwanenburg - Haarlem Spaanwoude - Haarlem - Bloemendaal - Santpoort Zuid- Santpoort Noord - Driehuis - Beverwijk - Heemskerk - Uitgeest - Castricum - Heiloo - Alkmaar - Alkmaar Noord- Heerhugowaard- Obdam	Hoorn	2/hour	Runs only 1x per hour between Alkmaar and Hoorn after 8.00 pm
Sprinter 5400	NS	Amsterdam Centraal	Amsterdam Sloterdijk - Halweg-Zwanenburg - Haarlem Spaarnwoude - Haarlem - Overveen	Zandvoort aan Zee	2/hour	
Sprinter 6300	NS	Den Haag Centraal	Den Haag Laan van NOI - Den Haag Mariahoeve - Voorschoten - De Vink - Leiden Centraal - Voorhout - Hillegom - Heemstede-Aerdenhout	Haarlem	2/hour	After 8.00 pm and in weekends the service towards Den Haag Centraal terminates at Leiden Centraal
Sprinter 15400	NS	Haarlem	Overveen	Zandvoort aan Zee	2/hour	Only in service during the summer season

== Bus services ==
Operator	Line	Route	Service
Connexxion	2	Haarlem Spaarwoude - Zuiderpolder - Potgieterbuurt - Centrum - Haarlem Station - Sinnevelt - Delftwijk - Deltplein	
Connexxion	3	Haarlem Schalkwijk - Haarlem Station - Haarlem Delftplein - Velserbroek - Driehuis - IJmuiden	
Connexxion	8	Haarlem Station → Hogeschool INHOLLAND → Overveen → Haarlem Station	Some services terminate at Overveen Adriaan Stoopplein
Connexxion	14	Hillegom - Vogelenzang - Bennebroek - Heemstede de Glip - Heemstede Station - Haarlem Station - Haarlem Delftplein - Spaarndam - Haarlemmerliede	During peak hours, there are extra services between Haarlem Station and Haarlem Delftplein (2/hour)
Connexxion	15	Spaarnwoude - Waarderpolder - Haarlem Station	
Arriva	50	Leiden - Oegstgeest - Warmond - Sassenheid - Lisse - Hillgom - Bennebroek - Heemstede - Haarlem Station	
Connexxion	73	Haarlem Schalkwijk - Haarlem Station - Haarlem Delftplein - Velserbroek - Beverwijk - Heemskerk - Uitgeest	
Connexxion	81	Haarlem Station - Bloemendaal aan Zee - Zandvoort	
Connexxion	84	Haarlem Station - Bloemendaal aan Zee - Zandvoort	Only in service between the 9th of March and the 29th of September and only on busy days, at events in Bloemendaal and Zandvoort and when temperatures are 25 °C of above.
Connexxion	255	Haarlem Station - Amsterdam Zuidoost	Only in service during peak hours
Connexxion	300	Haarlem Station - Vijfhuizen - Hoofddorp - De Hoek - Schiphol-Centrum - Schiphol-Noord - Amstelveen - Ouderkerk aan de Amstel - Amsterdam Zuidoost	Busses under the brand R-net
Connexxion	340	Haarlem Station - Heemstede - Cruquius - Hoofddorp - Rozenburg - Aalsmeer - Uithoorn - Mijdrecht	Busses under the brand R-net
Connexxion	346	Haarlem Station - Amsterdam VUmc - Amsterdam Station Zuid	Busses under the brand R-net
Connexxion	356	Haarlem Station - Badhoevedorp - Schiphol-Noord - Amstelveen - Ouderkerk aan de Amstel - Amsterdam Zuidoost	Busses under the brand R-net
Connexxion	385	Haarlem Station - Santpoort - Driehuis - IJmuiden (- IJmuiden aan Zee)	Services to IJmuiden aan Zee only during summer; Busses under the brand R-net
Connexxion	507	Haarlem Station - Cruquius Paswerk	In the morning: one service toward Cruquius Paswerk; In the afternoon: one service toward Haarlem Station; Busses under the brand R-net
Connexxion	N30	IJmuiden - Driehuis - Santpoort-Noord - Haarlem Station - Vijfhuizen - Hoofddorp - De Hoek - Schiphol-Centrum - Schiphol-Noord - Amstelveen - Ouderkerk aan de Amstel - Amsterdam-Zuidoost	Nightbusses under the brand R-net
Connexxion	N80	Amsterdam Centrum → Halfweg → Haarlem Station → Velserbroek → Driehuis → IJmuiden	Nightbusses under the brand R-net

== Gallery ==
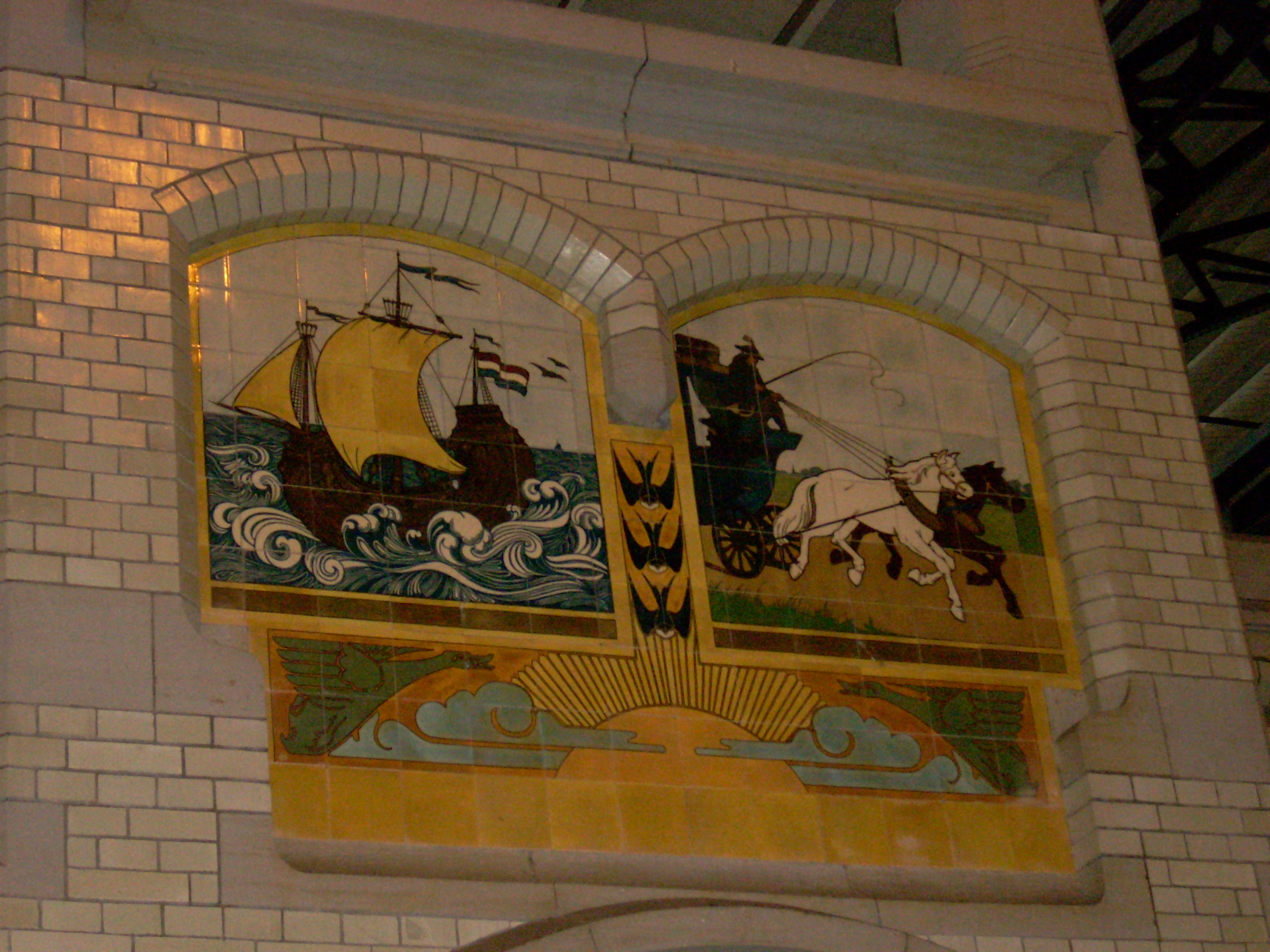
1900s decoration depicting the history of the Amsterdam-Haarlem train route from the trekschuit to carriageway along the haarlemmertrekvaart.

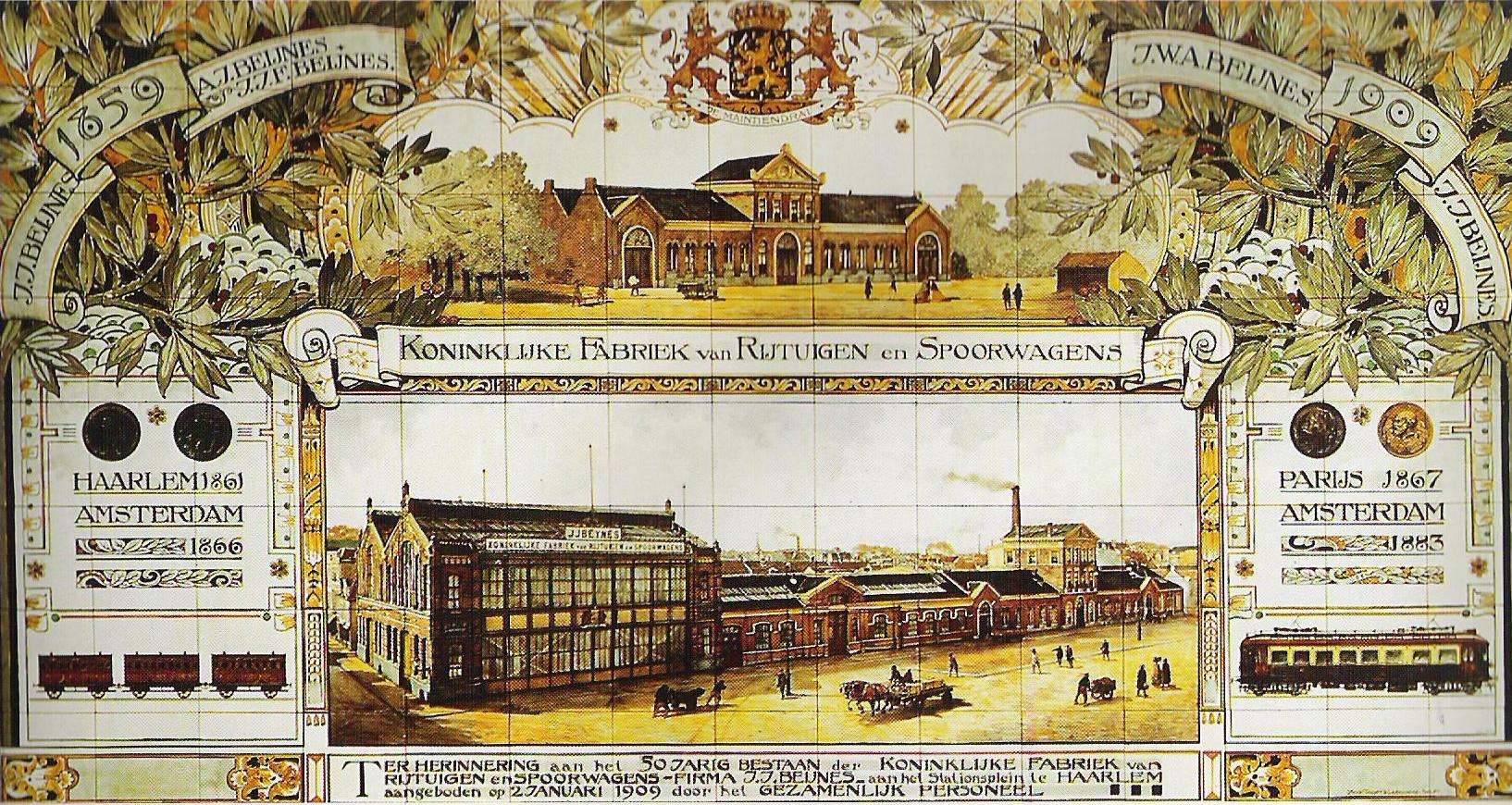
In this commemorative tile tablet for Beijnes, now in the Spoorwegmuseum, the old Beijnes factory across from the Haarlem station can be seen, that was built in the same style as the station itself in 1867. The Beijnes hall and workshop was situated across from the station, and is where the train locomotives were serviced and where the train and tram carriages were made.

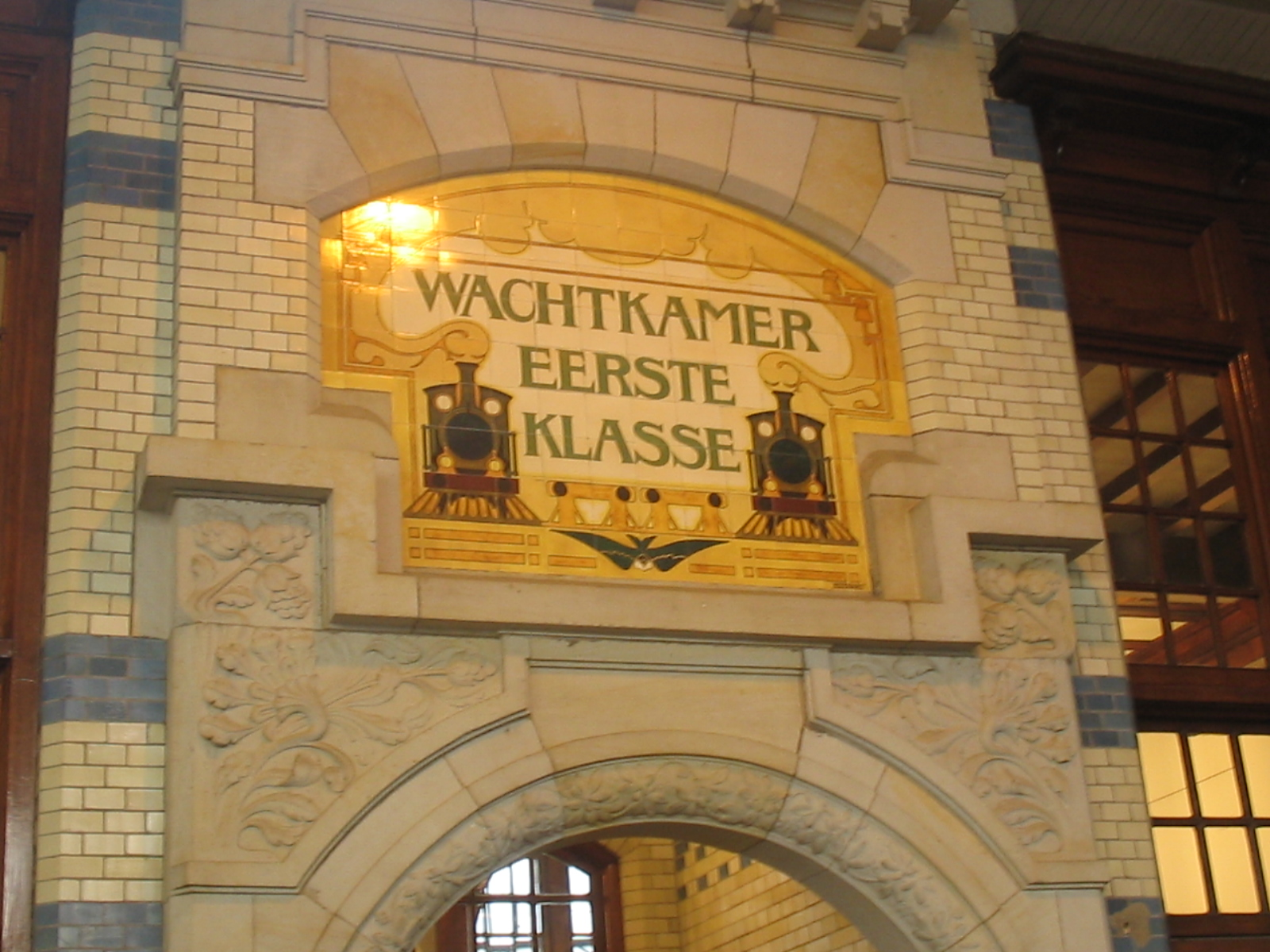
Waiting room first class; the cow-catchers depicted on the train engines are historically inaccurate and were never found on Dutch train engines.

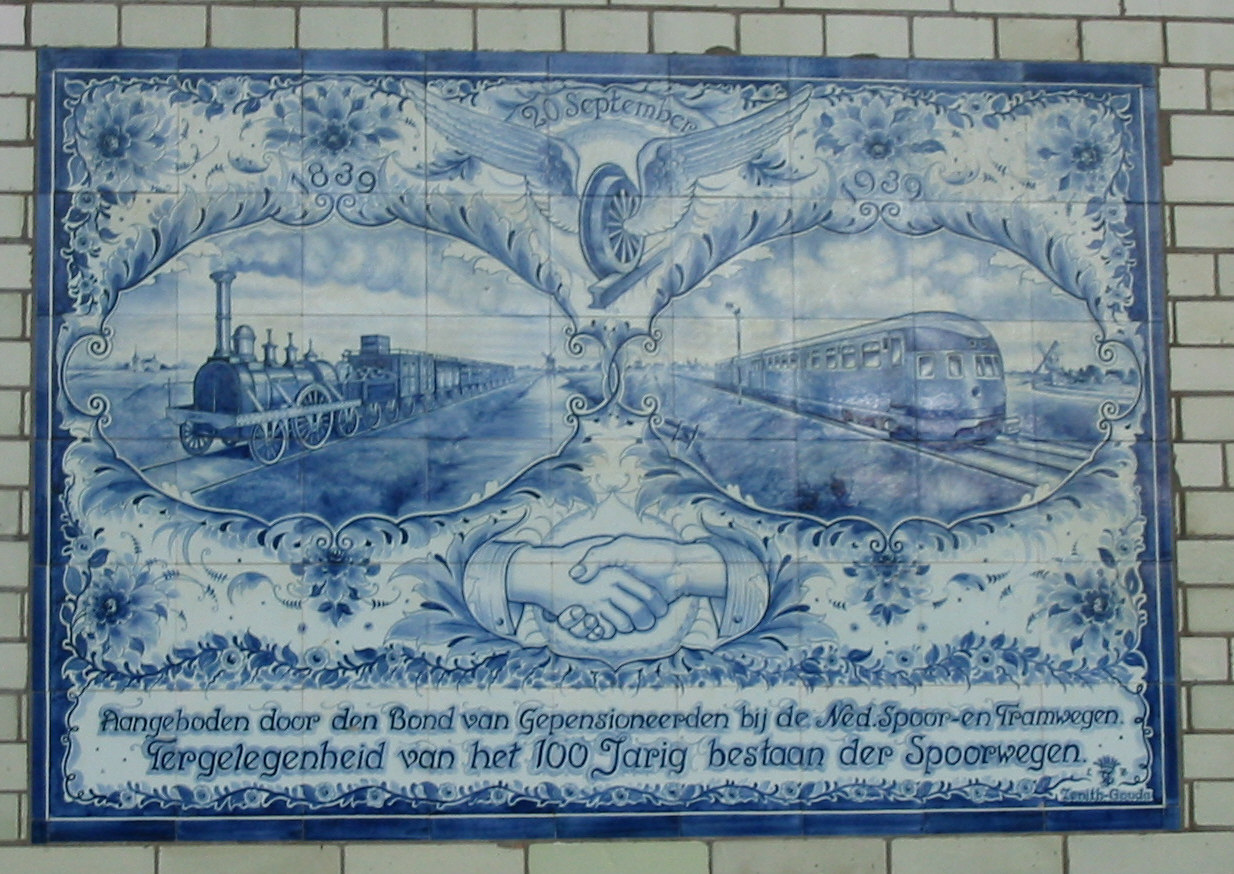
1939 tile memorial plaque celebrating 100 years of railway history shows accurate early engine on the left.

== In popular culture ==
The scenes in the 2004 film Ocean's Twelve that are meant to portray Amsterdam Centraal station were actually shot on platform 3a at Haarlem station.
