= Beverwijk railway station =

Railway station in the Netherlands

Beverwijk
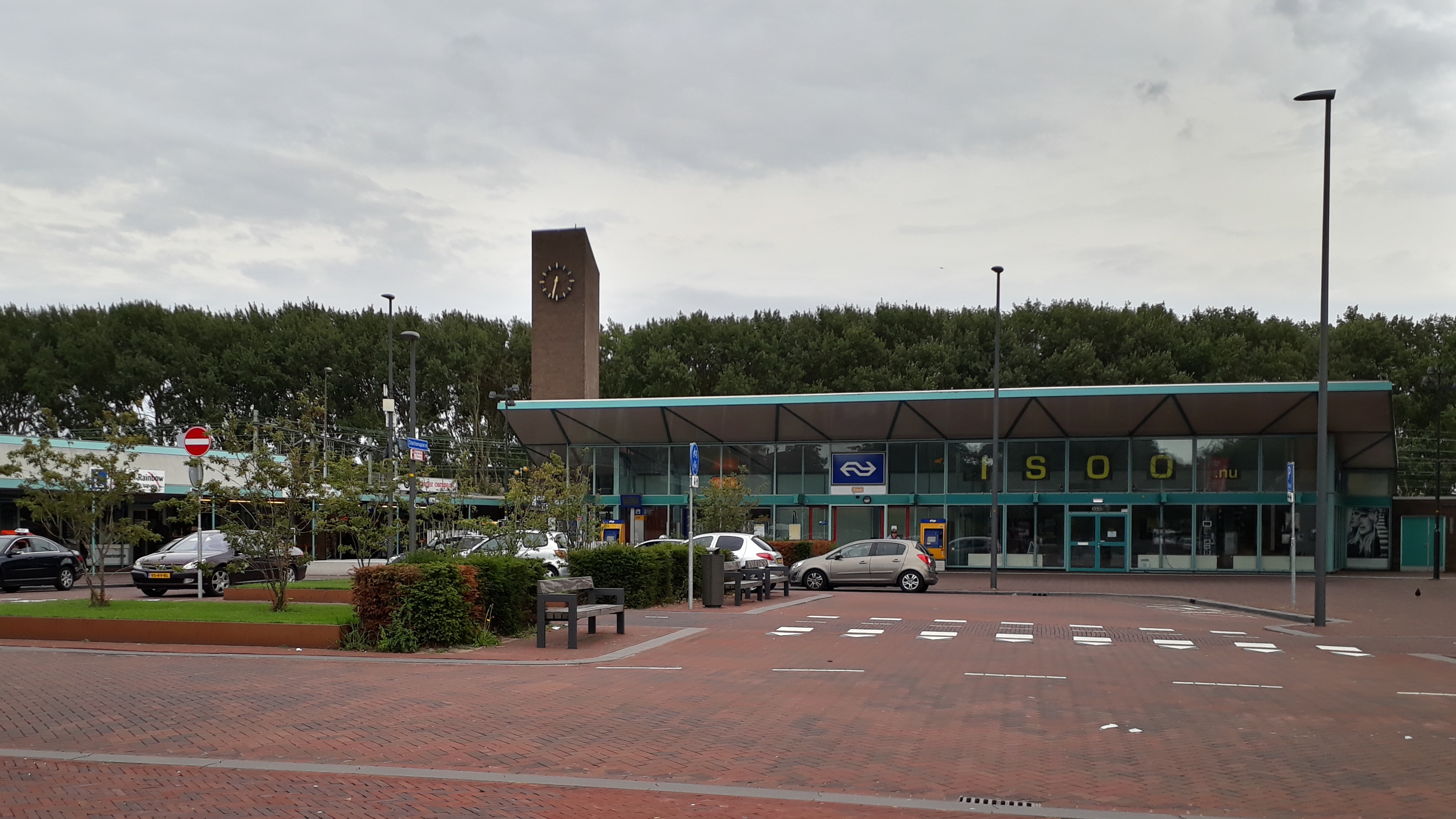
- The station in 2017

General information
- Location: Netherlands
- Coordinates: 52°28′42″N 4°39′22″E
- Line: Haarlem–Uitgeest railway

History
- Opened: 1 May 1867

Services
Preceding station	Nederlandse Spoorwegen	Following station
Heemskerk towards Hoorn	NS Sprinter 4800	Driehuis towards Amsterdam Centraal
Location
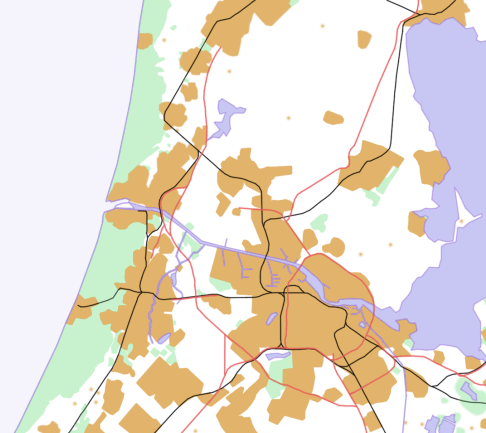
- Location within Northern Randstad Location within Netherlands

Beverwijk railway station is located in Beverwijk, the Netherlands. The station opened on 1 May 1867 and is on the Haarlem–Uitgeest railway.

== Train services ==
As of 12 December 2021, the following services call at Beverwijk:

=== National rail ===
Train	Operator(s)	From	Via	To	Freq.	Service
Sprinter 4800	NS	Amsterdam Centraal	Amsterdam Sloterdijk - Halfweg-Zwanenburg - Haarlem Spaanwoude - Haarlem - Bloemendaal - Santpoort Zuid - Santpoort Noord - Driehuis - Beverwijk - Heemskerk - Uitgeest - Castricum - Heiloo - Alkmaar - Alkmaar Noord - Heerhugowaard - Obdam	Hoorn	2/hour	Runs only 1x per hour between Alkmaar and Hoorn after 8.00 pm

== Bus services ==
Operator	Line	Route	Service
Connexxion	59	Beverwijk NS - Assendelft - Nauerna - Westzaan - Zaandam NS	
Connexxion	71	Uitgeest NS - Assum - Heemskerk - Beverwijk NS	Follows almost the same route as line 73, but follows an alternative route between Beverwijk NS and Heemskerk, Jan Ligthartstraat
Connexxion	72	Heemskerk Ruysdaelstraat - Beverwijk NS	
Connexxion	73	Uitgeest NS - Assum - Heemskerk - Beverwijk NS - Velsen-Noord - Velserbroek - Haarlem NS - Haarlem Schalkwijk	
Connexxion	74	Heemskerk Meerstaete - Beverwijk NS - Velsen-Noord - Velsen-Zuid - IJmuiden Zeewijk (Dennekoplaan)	
Connexxion	75	Beverwijk NS - Plantage - Wijk aan Zee	
Connexxion	76	Beverwijk NS - Beverwijk Bazaar	Only on Saturdays and Sundays
Connexxion	78	Beverwijk NS - Wijk aan Zee	
Connexxion	79	Beverwijk NS - Heemskerk - Castricum NS - Castricum Soomerwegh	
