= Halfweg-Zwanenburg railway station =

Railway station in the Netherlands

Halfweg-Zwanenburg
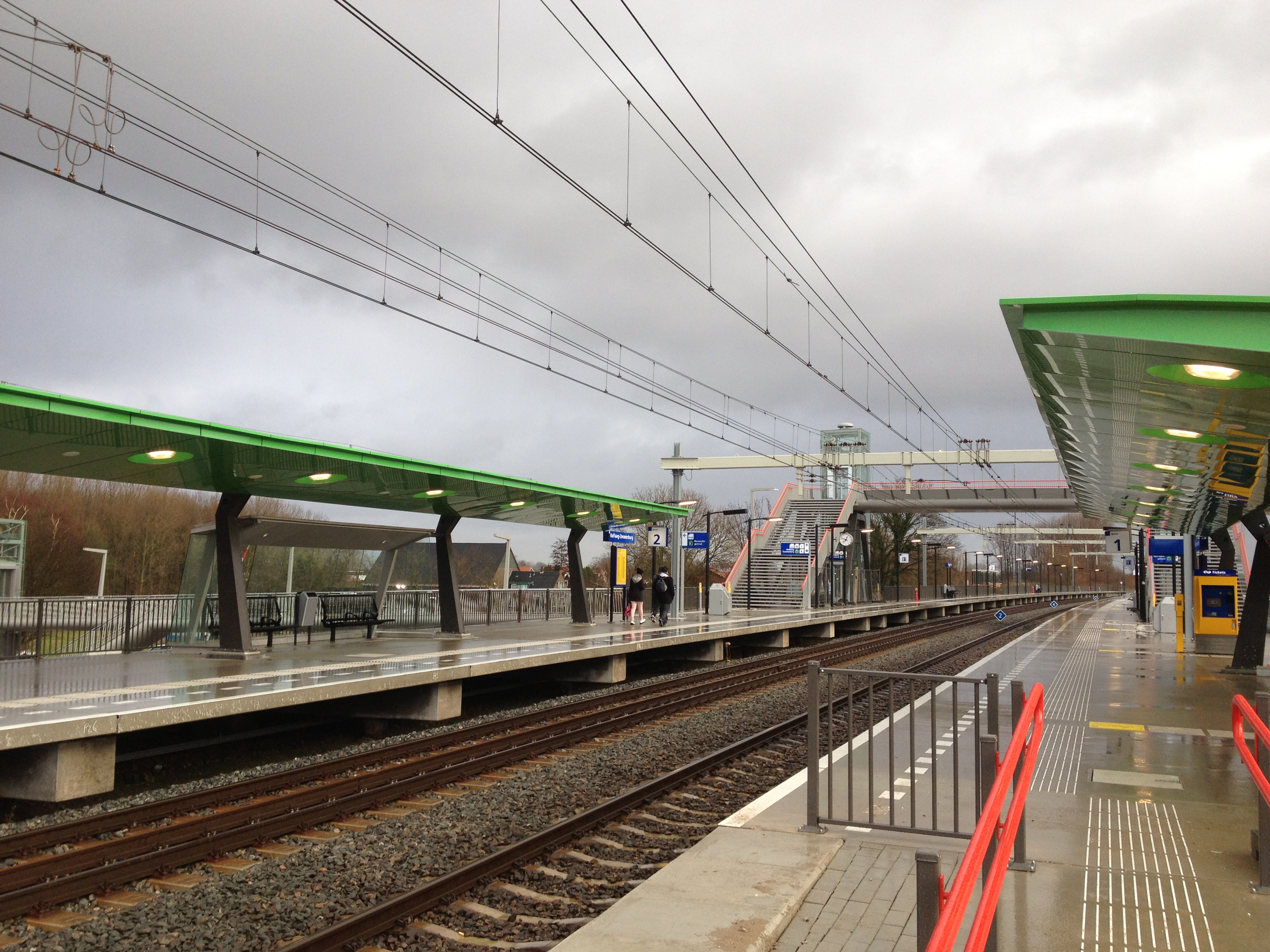

General information
- Location: Netherlands
- Coordinates: 52°23′05″N 4°45′06″E

History
- Opened: 9 December 2012

Services
| Preceding station | Nederlandse Spoorwegen | Following station |
|---|---|---|
| Haarlem Spaarnwoude towards Hoorn | NS Sprinter 4800 | Amsterdam Sloterdijk towards Amsterdam Centraal |
| Haarlem Spaarnwoude towards Zandvoort | NS Sprinter 5400 | Amsterdam Sloterdijk towards Amsterdam Centraal |
Location
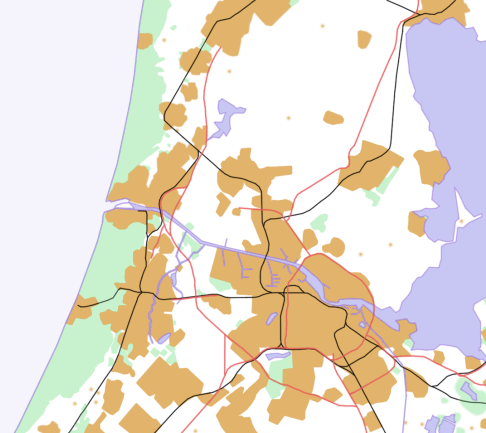
- Location within Northern Randstad Location within Netherlands

Halfweg-Zwanenburg (Dutch: Station Halfweg-Zwanenburg, pronounced [staːˈɕɔn ˌɦɑl(ə)fʋɛxˈsʋaːnə(m)bʏr(ə)x]) is a railway station in west Halfweg and near Zwanenburg, Netherlands. It was opened on 9 December 2012 on the Amsterdam–Rotterdam railway

== History ==
There was a station in Halfweg between 20 September 1839 and 2 October 1927; the new station lies roughly where the original station did. The station was opened in December 2012. The station lies on the Oude Lijn (Amsterdam – Rotterdam), between Amsterdam Sloterdijk and Haarlem Spaarnwoude. The station primarily services Halfweg and Zwanenburg, but also Haarlemmerliede and other surrounding small settlements.

There was a tree planted beside the platform on 30 April 2013 in honour of King Willem-Alexander.

== Train services ==
As of 9 December 2018, the following train services call at this station:

=== National rail ===
| Train | Operator(s) | From | Via | To | Freq. | Service |
|---|---|---|---|---|---|---|
| Sprinter 4800 | NS | Amsterdam Centraal | Amsterdam Sloterdijk – Halfweg-Zwanenburg – Haarlem Spaanwoude – Haarlem – Bloemendaal – Santpoort Zuid – Santpoort Noord – Driehuis – Beverwijk – Heemskerk – Uitgeest – Castricum – Heiloo – Alkmaar – Alkmaar Noord – Heerhugowaard – Obdam | Hoorn | 2/hour | Runs only 1x per hour between Alkmaar and Hoorn after 8.00 pm |
| Sprinter 5400 | NS | Amsterdam Centraal | Amsterdam Sloterdijk – Halweg-Zwanenburg – Haarlem Spaarnwoude – Haarlem – Overveen | Zandvoort aan Zee | 2/hour | |

== Bus services ==
| Operator | Line | Route | Service |
|---|---|---|---|
| Connexxion | 80 | Amsterdam Centrum – Halfweg-Zwanenburg NS – Haarlem – Heemstede – Aerdenhout | |
| Connexxion | 161 | Hoofddorp – Lijnden – Boesingheliede – Halfweg-Zwanenburg NS – Zwanenburg | |
| Connexxion | 680 | Zwanenburg – Halfweg-Zwanenburg NS – Haarlem – Heemstede – Aerdenhout | 4/day (weekdays only) toward Aerdenhout, of which the first ride terminates at Heemstede-Aerdenhout NS; 2/day (weekdays only) toward Zwanenburg |
| Connexxion | N80 | Amsterdam Centrum → Halfweg-Zwanenburg NS → Haarlem Spaarnwoude → Haarlem Station → Velserbroek → Driehuis → IJmuiden | Nightbus under the brand R-Net |
