= Driehuis railway station =

Railway station in Driehuis, Netherlands

Driehuis
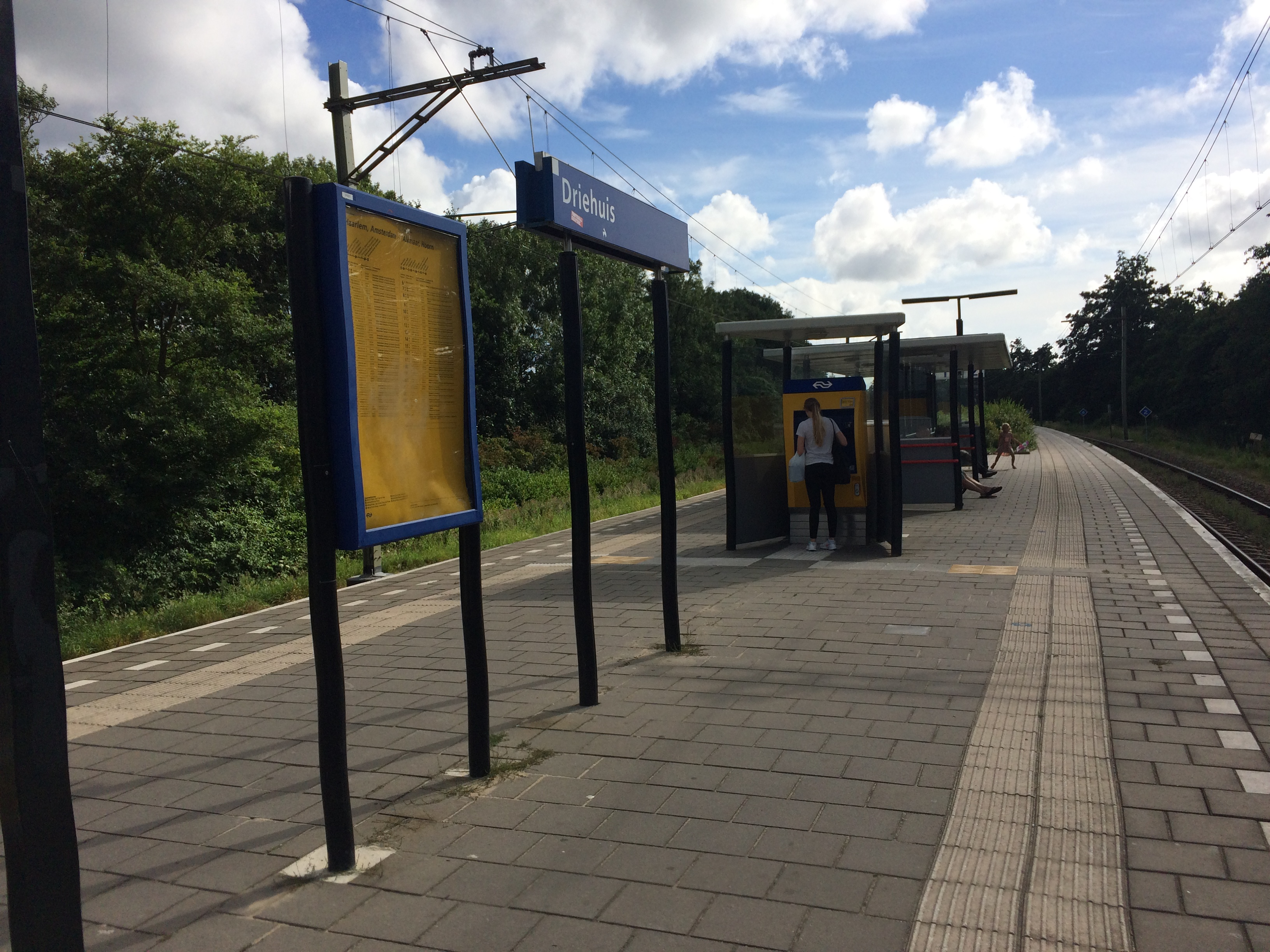

General information
- Location: Driehuis, Netherlands
- Coordinates: 52°26′34″N 4°38′21″E
- Line: Haarlem–Uitgeest railway
- Platforms: 1 (island platform)
- Tracks: 2

History
- Opened: 29 September 1957; 69 years ago

Services
Preceding station	Nederlandse Spoorwegen	Following station
Beverwijk towards Hoorn	NS Sprinter 4800	Santpoort Noord towards Amsterdam Centraal
Location
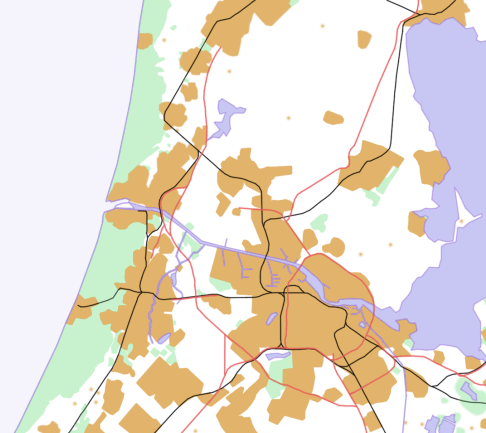
- Location within Northern Randstad Location within Netherlands

Driehuis is a railway station in Driehuis, Netherlands. It opened in 1957 on the Haarlem–Uitgeest railway. The station has one island platform and is served by Nederlandse Spoorwegen (NS) Sprinter services. Until 1983 it was called Driehuis Zuid (Driehuis South).

== Train services ==
As of 9 December 2018, the following services call at Driehuis:

=== National rail ===
Train	Operator(s)	From	Via	To	Freq.	Service
Sprinter 4800	NS	Amsterdam Centraal	Amsterdam Sloterdijk - Halfweg-Zwanenburg - Haarlem Spaanwoude - Haarlem - Bloemendaal - Santpoort Zuid - Santpoort Noord - Driehuis - Beverwijk - Heemskerk - Uitgeest - Castricum - Heiloo - Alkmaar - Alkmaar Noord - Heerhugowaard - Obdam	Hoorn	2/hour	Runs only 1x per hour between Alkmaar and Hoorn after 8.00 pm

== Bus services ==
The nearest busstation to Driehuis railway station is Driehuis v.d. Vondellaan.

Operator	Line	Route	Service
Connexxion	3	Haarlem Schalkwijk - Haarlem NS - Haarlem Delftplein - Velserbroek - Driehuis v.d. Vondellaan - IJmuiden	
Connexxion	N30	IJmuiden Dennekoplaan - Driehuis v.d. Vondellaan - Santpoort-Noord - Haarlem Delftplein - Haarlem NS - Haarlem Schalkwijk - Vijfhuizen - Hoofddorp NS - De Hoek - Schiphol Airport - Schiphol-Noord - Amstelveen - Ouderkerk a/d Amstel - Amsterdam Bijlmer ArenA	Nightbus under the brand R-net
