= Haarlem Spaarnwoude railway station =

Railway station in the Netherlands

Haarlem Spaarnwoude
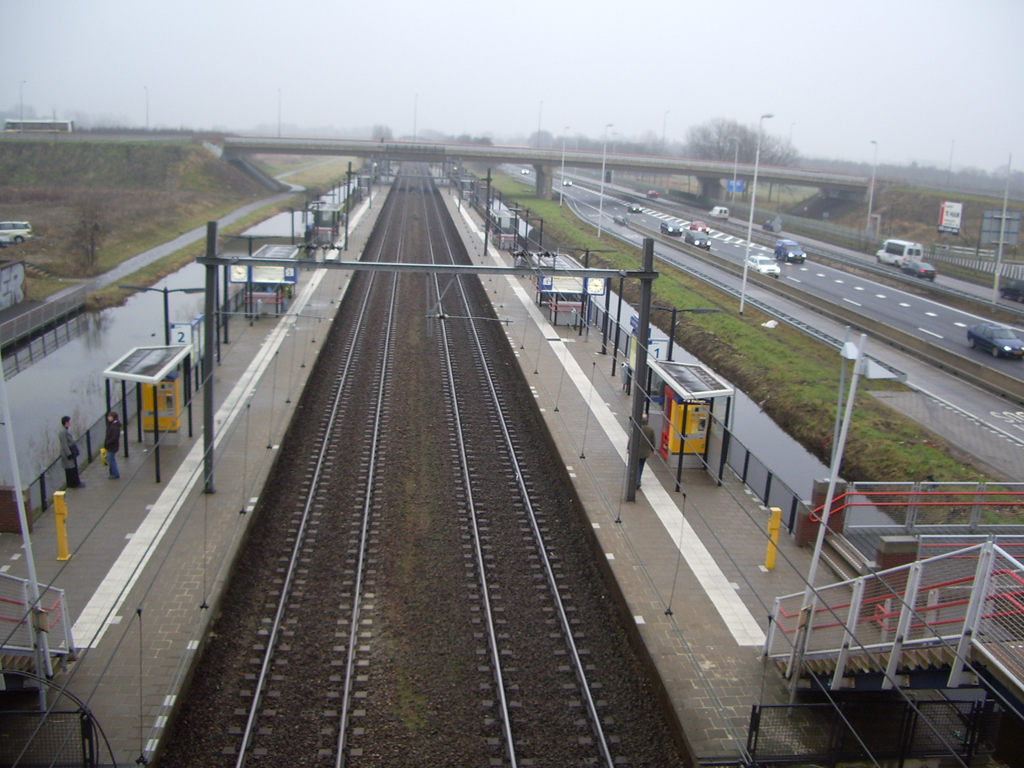

General information
- Location: Haarlem, Netherlands
- Coordinates: 52°22′58″N 4°40′16″E
- Line: Amsterdam–Rotterdam railway
- Platforms: 2

Other information
- Station code: Hlms

History
- Opened: 24 May 1998

Services
Preceding station	Nederlandse Spoorwegen	Following station
Haarlem towards Zandvoort	NS Sprinter 5400	Halfweg-Zwanenburg towards Amsterdam Centraal
Haarlem towards Hoorn	NS Sprinter 4800	Halfweg-Zwanenburg towards Amsterdam Centraal
Location
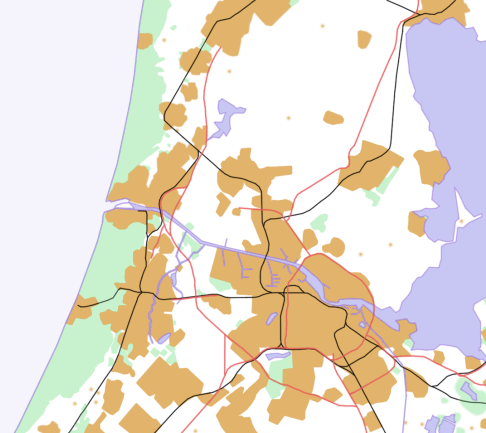
- Location within Northern Randstad Location within Netherlands

Haarlem Spaarnwoude is a railway station in Haarlem, Netherlands. It is located east of the Haarlem city centre and south of Spaarnwoude, on the Amsterdam–Rotterdam railway. The N200 road (from Amsterdam to Haarlem) runs parallel to the railway on the south side. The station opened on 24 May 1998. On the north side of the station is an IKEA store.

== Train services ==
As of 9 December 2018, the following train services call at this station:

=== National rail ===
Train	Operator(s)	From	Via	To	Freq.	Service
Sprinter 4800	NS	Amsterdam Centraal	Amsterdam Sloterdijk - Halfweg-Zwanenburg - Haarlem Spaanwoude - Haarlem - Bloemendaal - Santpoort Zuid - Santpoort Noord - Driehuis - Beverwijk - Heemskerk - Uitgeest - Castricum - Heiloo - Alkmaar - Alkmaar Noord - Heerhugowaard - Obdam	Hoorn	2/hour	Runs only 1x per hour between Alkmaar and Hoorn after 8.00 pm
Sprinter 5400	NS	Amsterdam Centraal	Amsterdam Sloterdijk - Halweg-Zwanenburg - Haarlem Spaarnwoude - Haarlem - Overveen	Zandvoort aan Zee	2/hour	

== Bus services ==
Operator	Line	Route	Service
Connexxion	2	Haarlem Spaarnwoude - Zuiderpolder - Potgieterbuurt - Centrum - Haarlem Station - Bomenbuurt - Sinnevelt - Delftwijk - Delftplein	
Connexxion	15	Haarlem Spaarnwoude - Waarderpolder - Haarlem Station	
Connexxion	80	Amsterdam Centrum - Halfweg - Haarlem Spaarnwoude - Heemstede - Aerdenhout	
Connexxion	680	Zwanenburg - Halfweg - Haarlem Spaarnwoude - Heemstede - Aerdenhout	4/day (weekdays only) toward Aerdenhout, of which the first ride terminates at Heemstede-Aerdenhout NS; 2/day (weekdays only) toward Zwanenburg
Connexxion	N80	Amsterdam Centrum → Halfweg → Haarlem Spaarnwoude → Haarlem Station → Velserbroek → Driehuis → IJmuiden	Nightbus under the brand R-net

== Tracks and platforms ==
The station is on a line with two tracks, and has no additional tracks and no railroad switches. Track 1 in on the south, for the direction Amsterdam, and track 2 on the north, for the direction Haarlem. Each track has its own platform. From the north side there is an entrance to the north platform through a footbridge over a ditch; from the bus stop on the north side of the N200 there is an entrance to the south platform through a footbridge over another ditch. There is a footbridge over the railway and the N200. It has three stairways: to each platform and at the south side of the N200. These entrances and footbridges are at the west end of the platforms. The platforms extend eastwards to under the Kegge Viaduct.
