= Santpoort Noord railway station =

Railway station in the Netherlands

Santpoort Noord
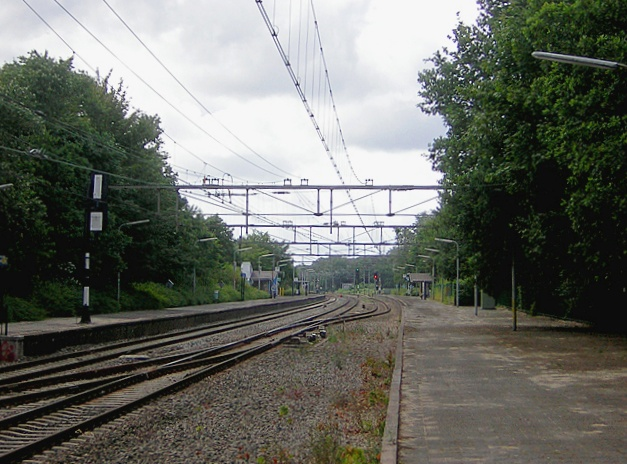

General information
- Location: Netherlands
- Coordinates: 52°26′34″N 4°38′21″E
- Line: Haarlem–Uitgeest railway

Services
Preceding station	Nederlandse Spoorwegen	Following station
Driehuis towards Hoorn	NS Sprinter 4800	Santpoort Zuid towards Amsterdam Centraal
Location
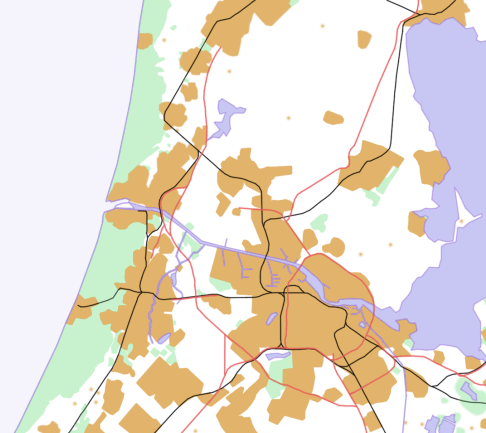
- Location within Northern Randstad Location within Netherlands

Santpoort Noord railway station is located in Santpoort-Noord, the Netherlands. The station opened 27 September 1957 on the Haarlem–Uitgeest railway. The station has 2 platforms. The station was situated at the junction with the railway to IJmuiden, which closed on 25 September 1983. That line re-opened between 1996 and 1999, when Lovers Rail operated a service between Amsterdam and IJmuiden.

== Train services ==
As of 9 December 2018, the following services call at Santpoort Noord:

=== National Rail ===
Train	Operator(s)	From	Via	To	Freq.	Service
Sprinter 4800	NS	Amsterdam Centraal	Amsterdam Sloterdijk - Halfweg-Zwanenburg - Haarlem Spaanwoude - Haarlem - Bloemendaal - Santpoort Zuid - Santpoort Noord - Driehuis - Beverwijk - Heemskerk - Uitgeest - Castricum - Heiloo - Alkmaar - Alkmaar Noord - Heerhugowaard - Obdam	Hoorn	2/hour	Runs only 1x per hour between Alkmaar and Hoorn after 8.00 pm

== Bus services ==
Operator	Line	Route	Service
Connexxion	481	Haarlem Vijver - Overveen NS - Bloemendaal NS - Santpoort-Zuid NS - Santpoort-Noord NS - Haarlem Delftplein/Spaarne Gasth.	
