= Santpoort Zuid railway station =

Railway station in the Netherlands

Santpoort Zuid
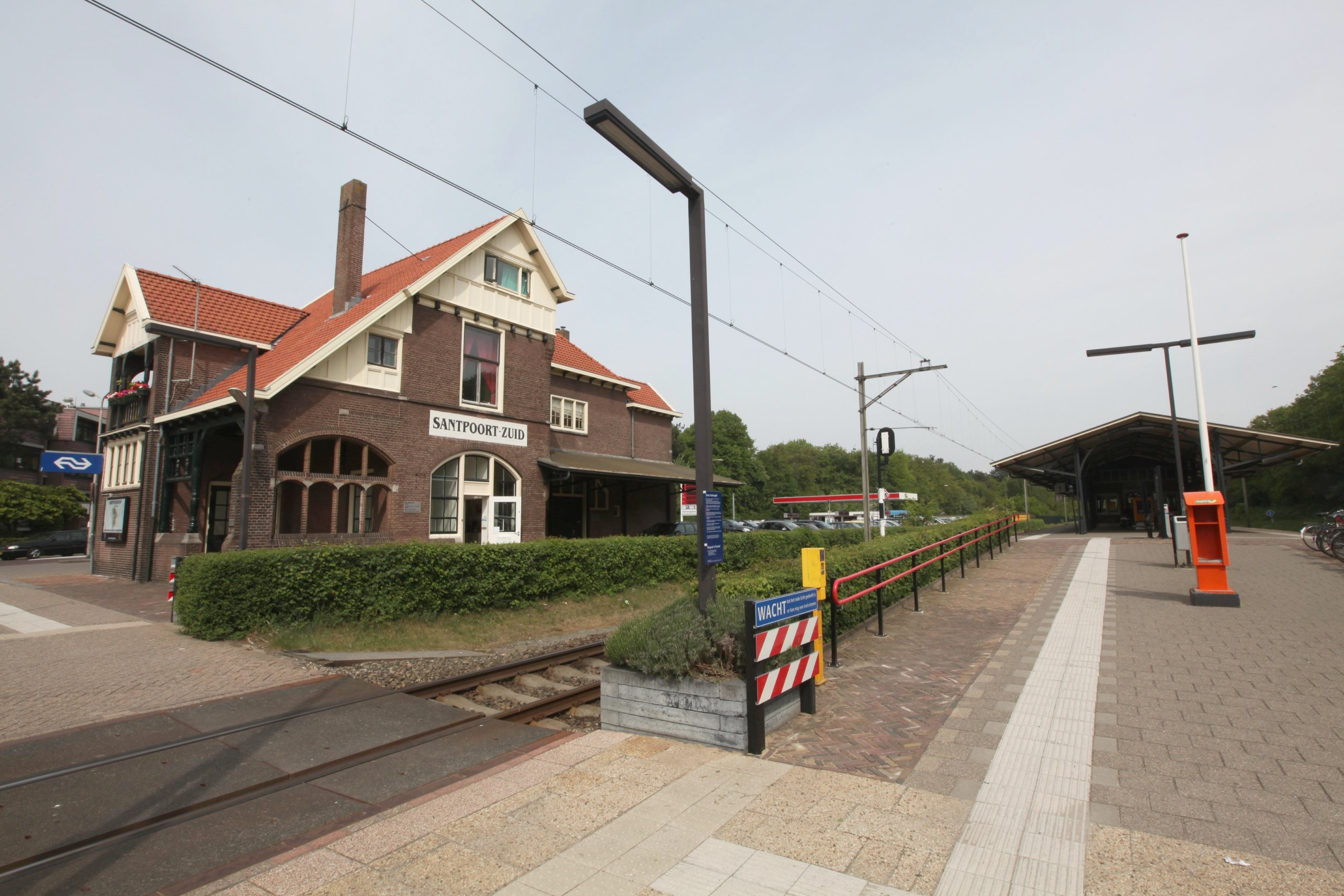

General information
- Location: Netherlands
- Coordinates: 52°25′10″N 4°37′54″E
- Line: Haarlem–Uitgeest railway

Services
Preceding station	Nederlandse Spoorwegen	Following station
Santpoort Noord towards Hoorn	NS Sprinter 4800	Bloemendaal towards Amsterdam Centraal
Location
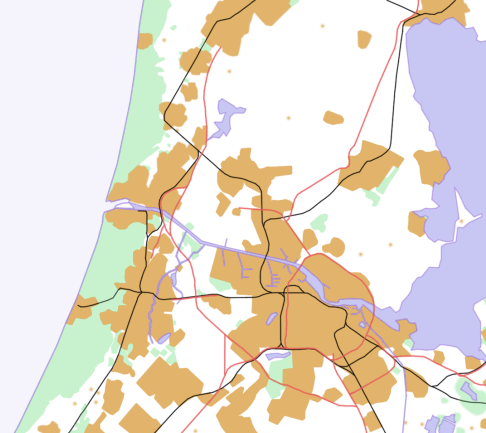
- Location within Northern Randstad Location within Netherlands

Santpoort Zuid railway station is located in Santpoort-Zuid, the Netherlands. The station opened 1 May 1867 on the Haarlem–Uitgeest railway. The station has 2 platforms.

== Train services ==
As of 9 December 2018, the following services call at Sandpoort Zuid:

=== National Rail ===
Train	Operator(s)	From	Via	To	Freq.	Service
Sprinter 4800	NS	Amsterdam Centraal	Amsterdam Sloterdijk - Halfweg-Zwanenburg - Haarlem Spaanwoude - Haarlem - Bloemendaal - Santpoort Zuid - Santpoort Noord - Driehuis - Beverwijk - Heemskerk - Uitgeest - Castricum - Heiloo - Alkmaar - Alkmaar Noord - Heerhugowaard - Obdam	Hoorn	2/hour	Runs only 1x per hour between Alkmaar and Hoorn after 8.00 pm

== Bus services ==
Operator	Line	Route	Service
Connexxion	481	Haarlem Vijver - Overveen NS - Bloemendaal NS - Santpoort-Zuid NS - Santpoort-Noord NS - Haarlem Delftplein/Spaarne Gasth.	
