= Driehuis =

- Village
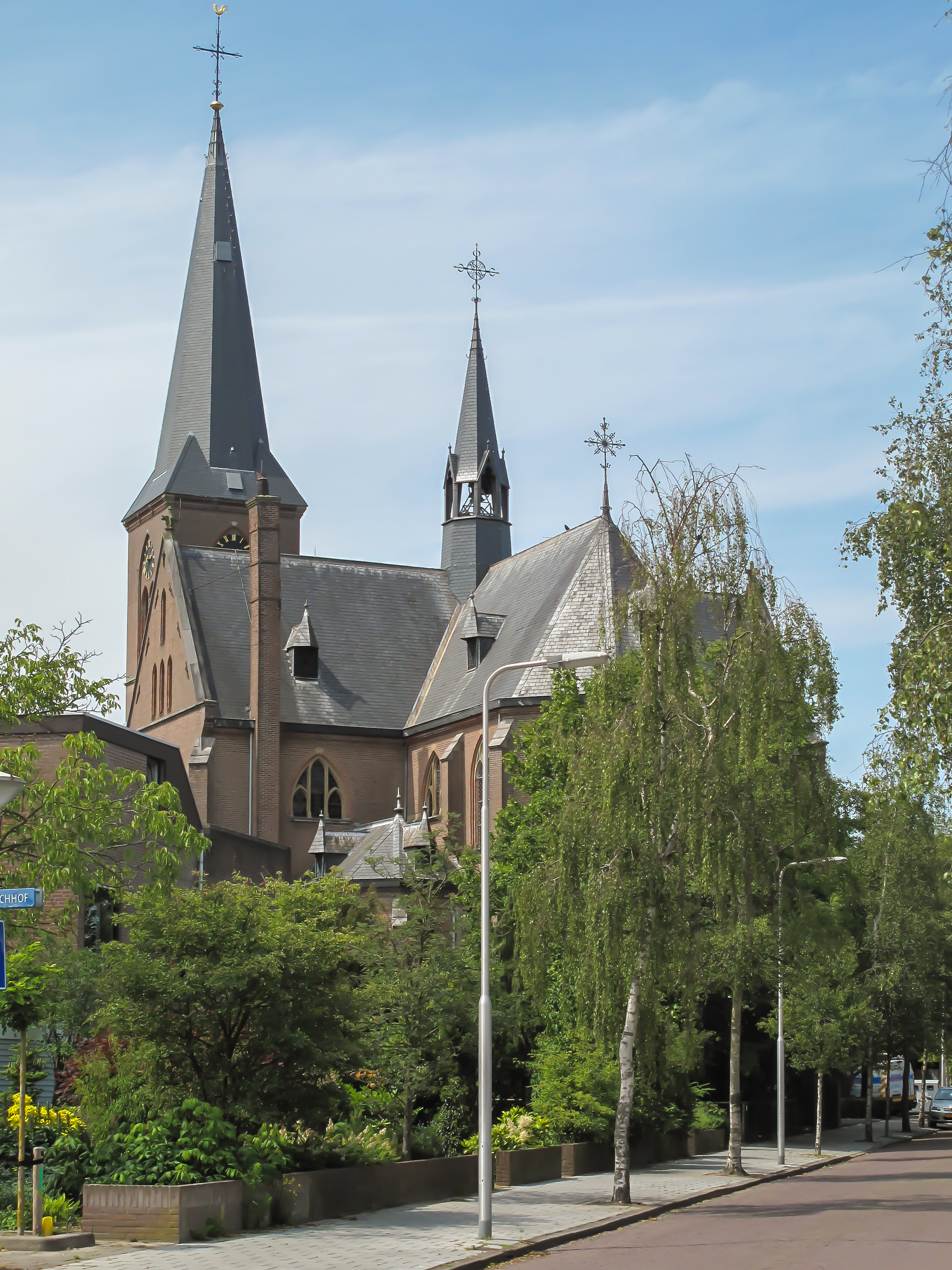
- Sint Engelmunds Church in Driehuis

- Location in the Netherlands Location in the province of North Holland in the Netherlands
- Coordinates: 52°26′50″N 4°38′12″E
- Country: Netherlands
- Province: North Holland
- Municipality: Velsen

Area
  - Total: 0.67 km^{2} (0.26 sq mi)
- Elevation: 4.2 m (14 ft)

Population (2021)
  - Total: 1,080
  - Density: 1,600/km^{2} (4,200/sq mi)
- Time zone: UTC+1 (CET)
  - Summer (DST): UTC+2 (CEST)
- Postal code: 1985
- Dialing code: 0255

Driehuis is a village in the Dutch province of North Holland; part of the municipality of Velsen, it lies about 8 km north of Haarlem and 15 km west-northwest of Amsterdam.

== History ==
It was first mentioned in 1680 as Drie Huysen, and means "three houses". Driehuizen developed in the 19th century at an intersection of roads. It is mainly a commuter's town.

The Catholic St Engelmundus Church is a three aisled basilica-like church constructed between 1893 and 1894 in Gothic Revival style. Estate Schoonenberg was originally the 18th century gardener's house of the old estate. The old estate was demolished in 1829 and the gardener's house was extended in chalet style in 1859 and 1869. The park was layout around 1800.

The village is home to the Westerveld Cemetery, a Dutch national heritage site.

== Transportation ==
In 1957, Driehuis railway station opened on the Haarlem to Uitgeest railway line.

== Natives from Driehuis ==
- Pim Fortuyn (1948–2002), author, professor and politician, assassinated during Dutch general election of 2002.
- Stella de Heij (1968), former field hockey player.

The ashes of Anthony Fokker were brought in 1940 to Westerveld Cemetery in Driehuis, where they were buried in the family grave. Christine Buisman, the phytopathologist who discovered the cause of Dutch elm disease, is also buried in the cemetery.

== Gallery ==
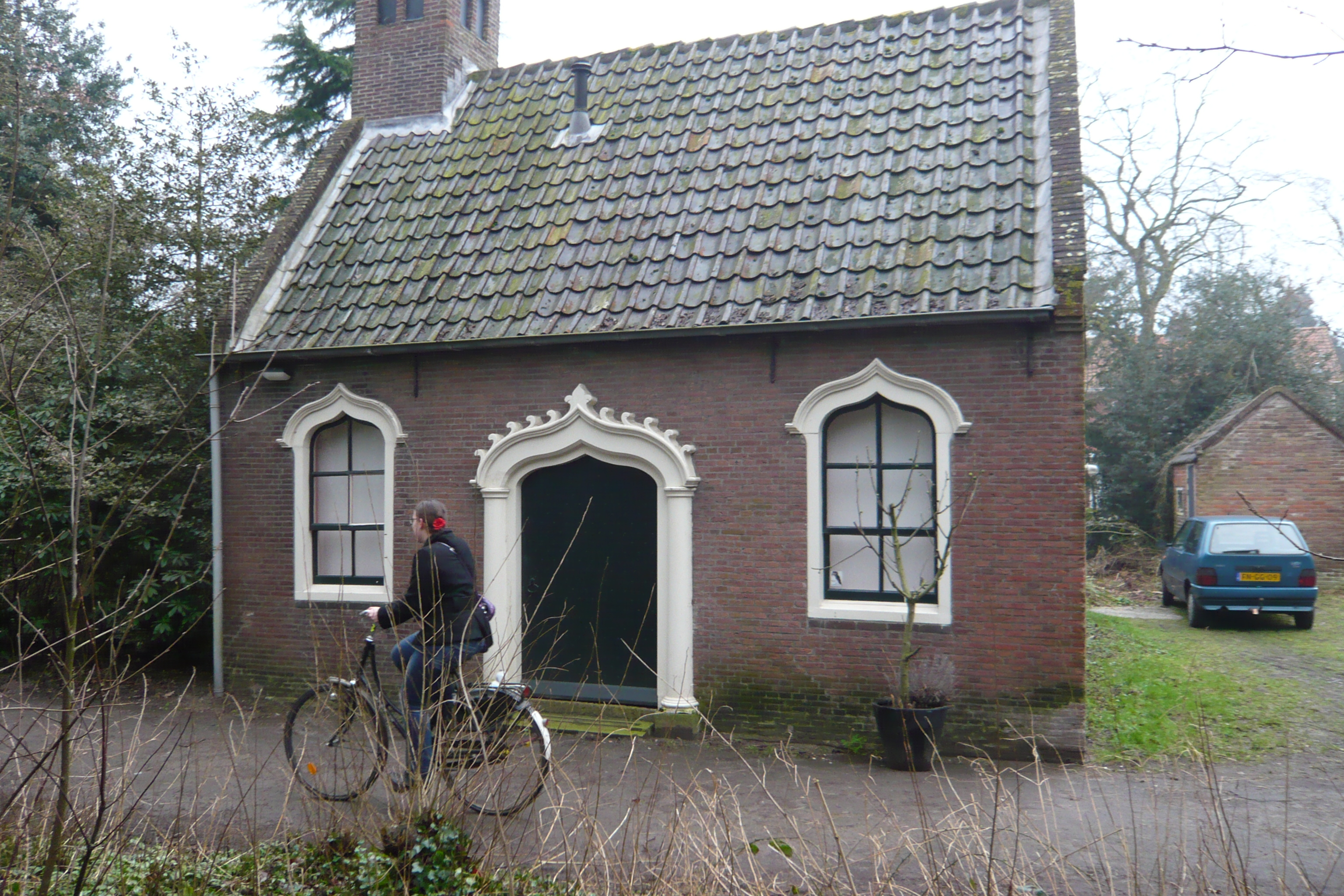
Gardener's house of Beeckestijn

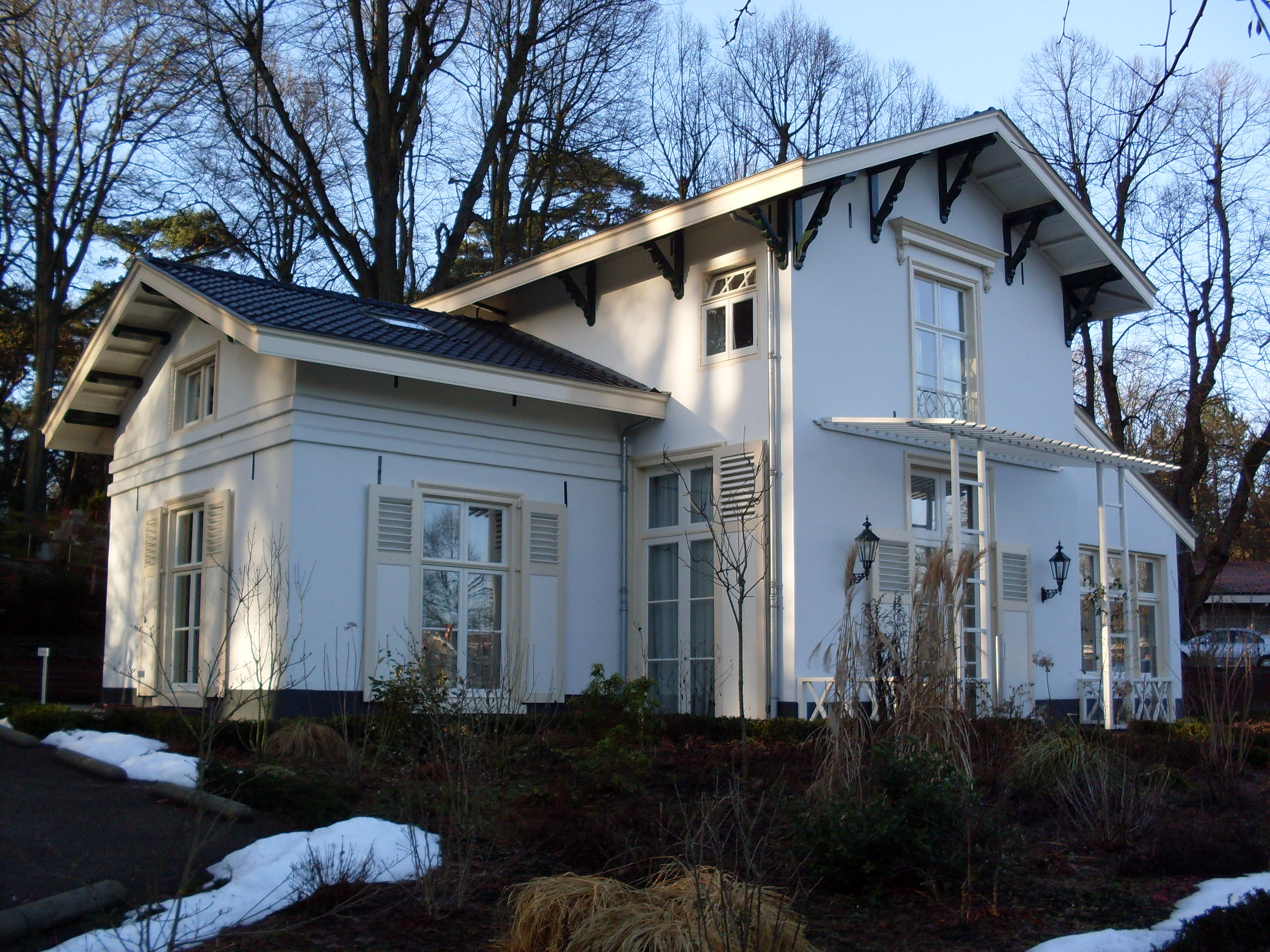
Villa Westerveld
