= Overveen railway station =

Railway station in Overveen, Netherlands

Overveen

General information
- Location: Overveen, Netherlands
- Coordinates: 52°23′27″N 4°36′28″E
- Line: Haarlem–Zandvoort railway
- Platforms: 1 (island platform)
- Tracks: 2

Other information
- Station code: Ovn

History
- Opened: 3 June 1881; 145 years ago

Services
Preceding station	Nederlandse Spoorwegen	Following station
Zandvoort Terminus	NS Sprinter 5400	Haarlem towards Amsterdam Centraal
Zandvoort Terminus	NS Sprinter 15400	Haarlem Terminus
Location
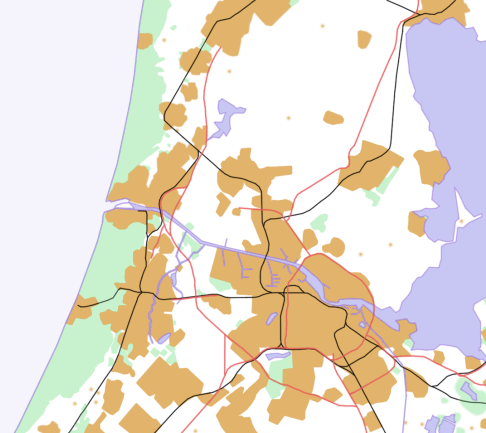
- Location within Northern Randstad Location within Netherlands

Overveen is a railway station in the village of Overveen, Netherlands. The station opened in 1881 on the Haarlem–Zandvoort railway. It has one island platform.

== History ==
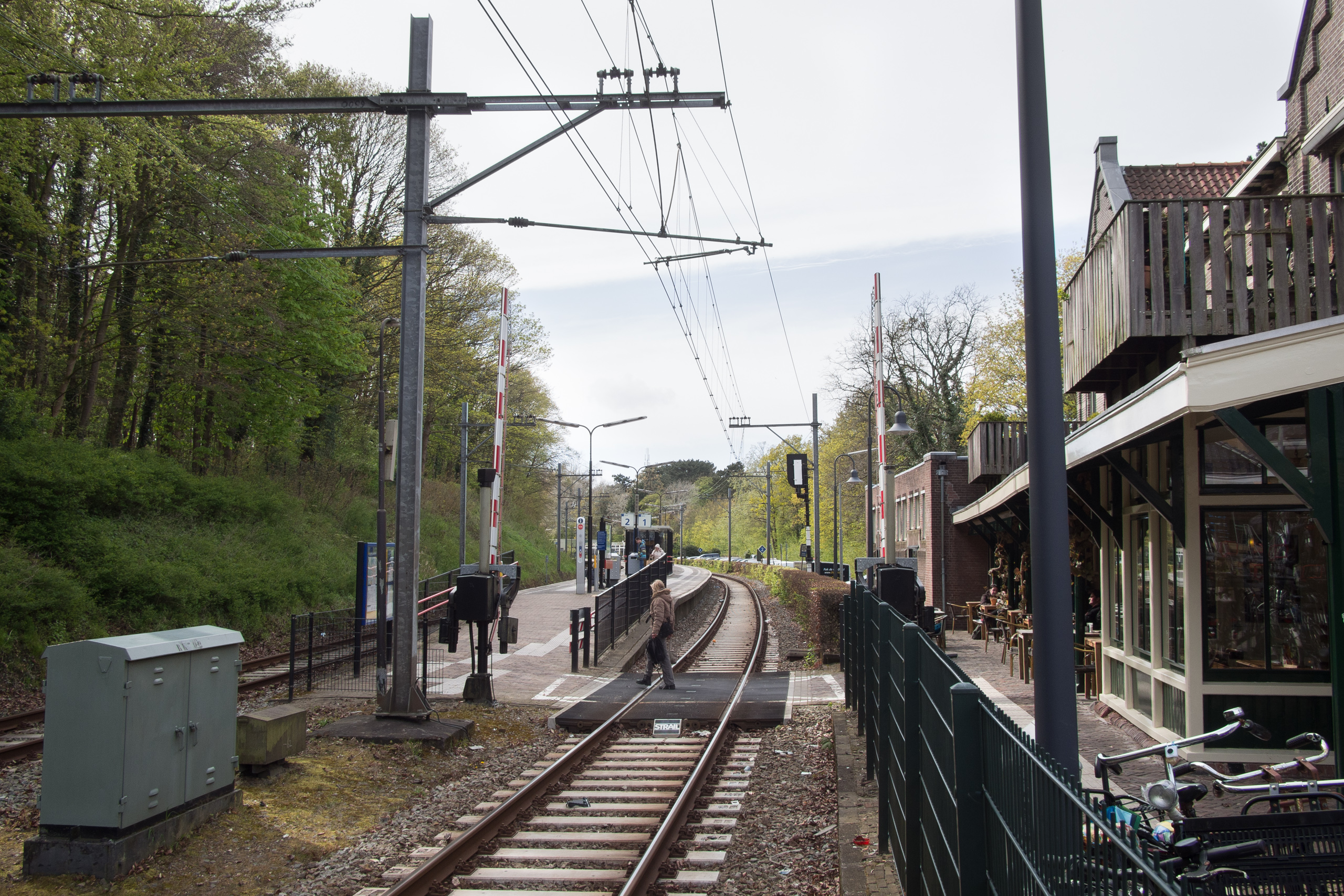
View of the tracks and platform

The station opened on 3 June 1881. It is located along the Tetterodeweg, just below Belvédère, a buitenplaats in the Brouwerskolkpark. Until 1 January 1900 the station name was Overveen-Bloemendaal, as Overveen lies in the municipality of Bloemendaal.

== Tourism ==
The station is located just near Zuid-Kennemerland National Park.

== Train services ==
As of 9 December 2018, the following services call at Overveen:

=== National rail ===
Train	Operator(s)	From	Via	To	Freq.	Service
Sprinter 5400	NS	Amsterdam Centraal	Amsterdam Sloterdijk - Halweg-Zwanenburg - Haarlem Spaarnwoude - Haarlem - Overveen	Zandvoort aan Zee	2/hour	
Sprinter 15400	NS	Haarlem	Overveen	Zandvoort aan Zee	2/hour	Only in service during the summer season

== Bus services ==
Operator	Line	Route	Service
Connexxion	481	Haarlem Delftplein - Santpoort - Bloemendaal NS - Overveen NS - Haarlem Ramplaankwartier	
