= Uitgeest railway station =

Railway station in the Netherlands

Uitgeest
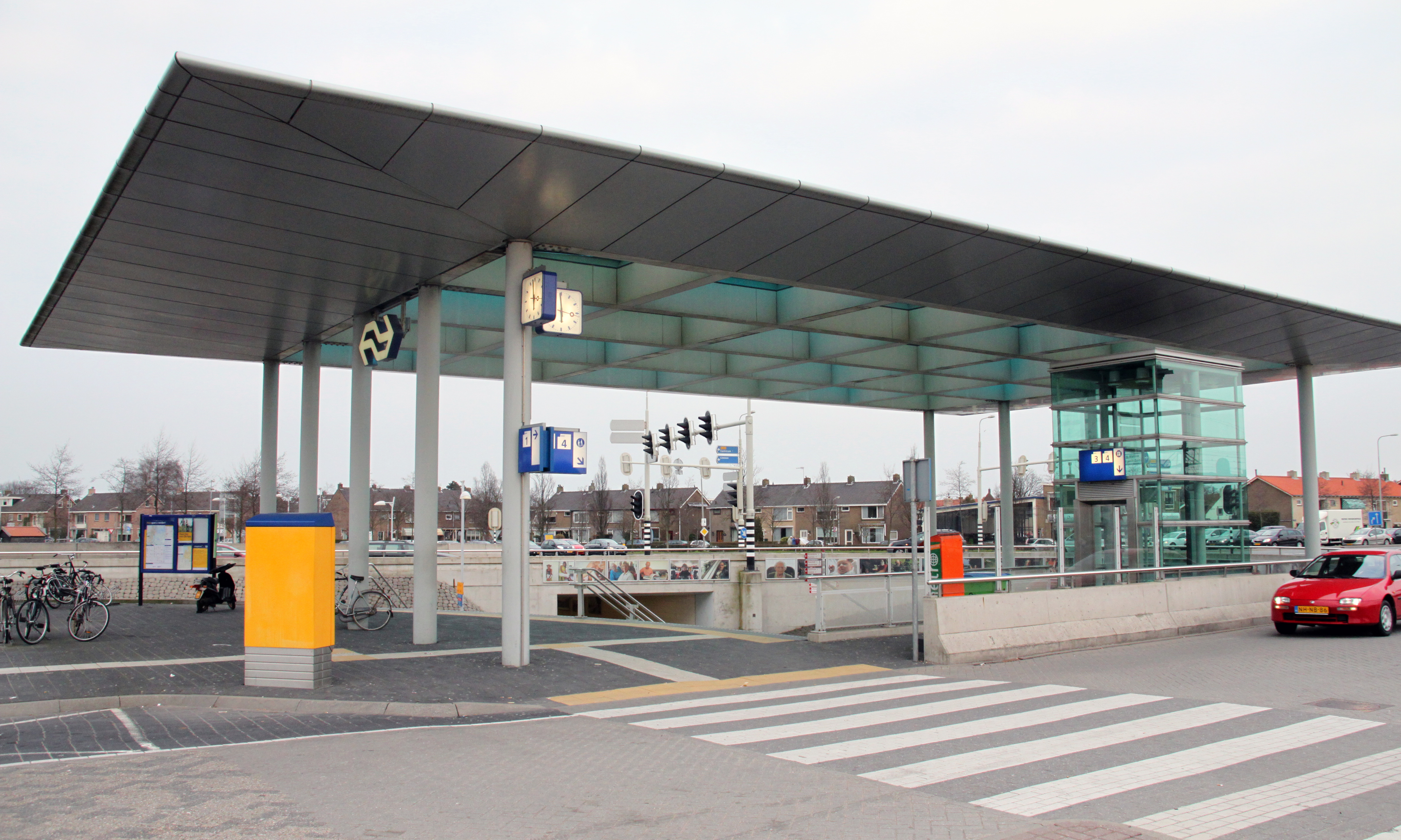
- The station's entrance building

General information
- Location: Netherlands
- Coordinates: 52°31′19″N 4°42′10″E
- Lines: Den Helder–Amsterdam railway Haarlem–Uitgeest railway

Services
Preceding station	Nederlandse Spoorwegen	Following station
Terminus	NS Sprinter 4000	Krommenie-Assendelft towards Rotterdam Centraal
Castricum towards Hoorn	NS Sprinter 4800	Heemskerk towards Amsterdam Centraal
Terminus	NS Sprinter 7400 Peak hours only	Krommenie-Assendelft towards Driebergen-Zeist
Location
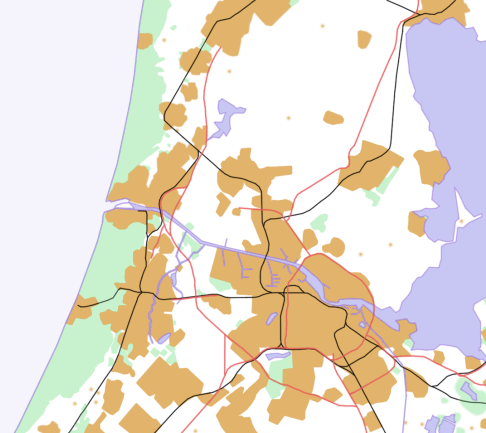
- Location within Northern Randstad Location within Netherlands

Uitgeest railway station is located in Uitgeest, the Netherlands. The station was opened on 1 May 1867 at the junction of the Den Helder–Amsterdam and the Haarlem–Uitgeest railways. A new station building was opened in 2006. The station has 3 platforms.

== Train services ==
As of 11 December 2016, the following services call at Uitgeest:

- 2x per hour local service (sprinter) Uitgeest - Zaandam - Amsterdam - Woerden - Rotterdam (all day, every day)
- 2x per hour local service (sprinter) Uitgeest - Zaandam - Amsterdam - Utrecht - Rhenen (only on weekdays until 8:00PM)
- 2x per hour local service (sprinter) Hoorn - Alkmaar - Uitgeest - Haarlem - Amsterdam (all day, every day)

== Bus services ==
Operator	Line	Route
Connexxion	71	Uitgeest - Assum - Heemskerk - Beverwijk
Connexxion	163	Uitgeest - Akersloot - Boekel - Alkmaar
Connexxion	N69	Amsterdam - Krommenie/Assendelft - Uitgeest - Limmen - Heiloo - Alkmaar

== Gallery ==
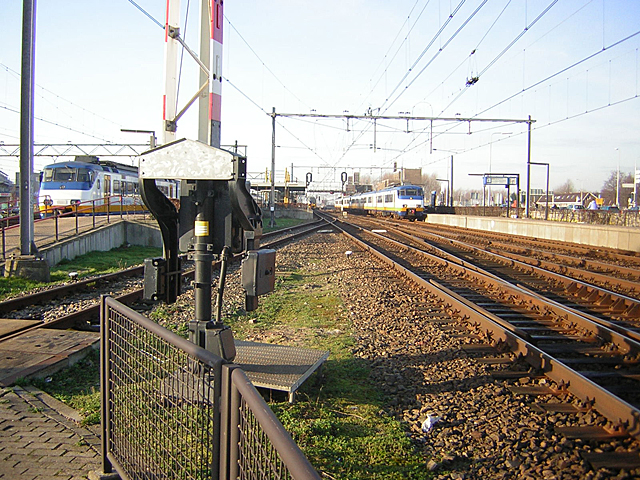
Uitgeest station in 2005

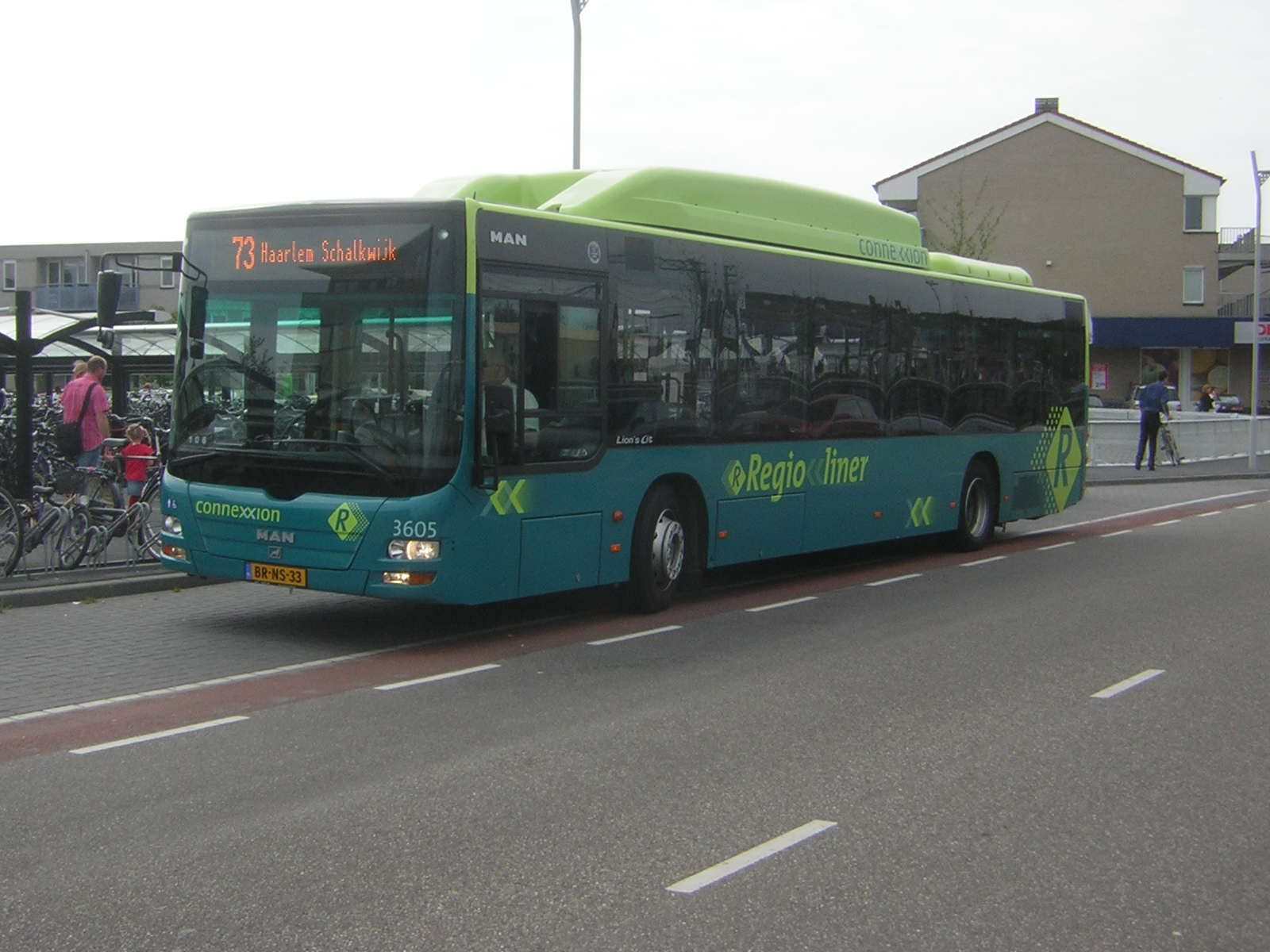
A "Man Lion City" gas-fuelled bus at Uitgeest station
