= Castricum railway station =

Railway station in the Netherlands

Castricum
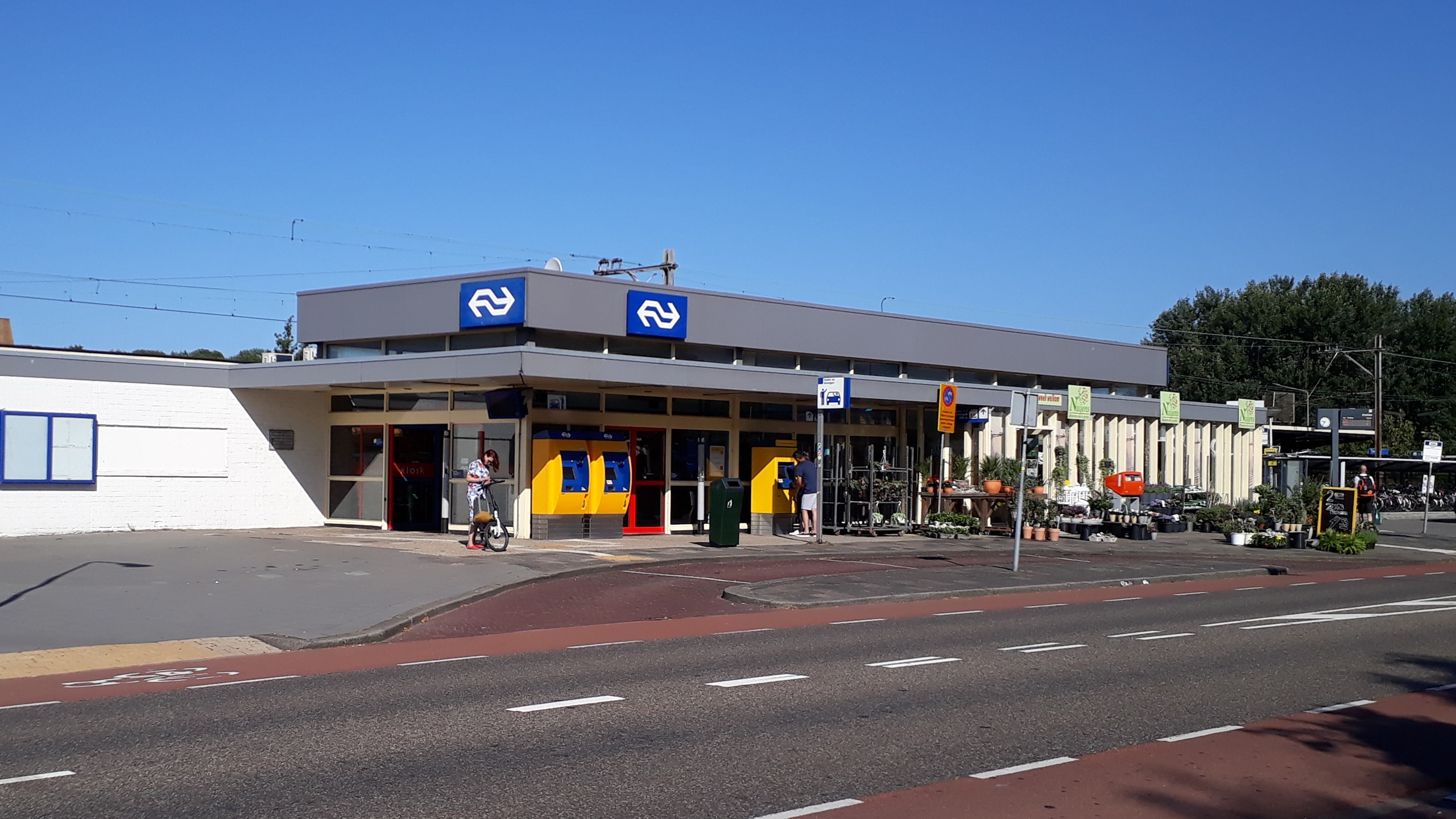

General information
- Location: Netherlands
- Coordinates: 52°32′44″N 4°39′32″E
- Line: Den Helder–Amsterdam railway

History
- Opened: 1 May 1867; 159 years ago

Services
Preceding station	Nederlandse Spoorwegen	Following station
Alkmaar Terminus	NS Intercity 2700 Mon-Thur until 19:00	Zaandam towards Maastricht
Alkmaar Terminus	NS Intercity 2700 Fri-Sun until 19:00	Zaandam towards Amsterdam Centraal
Heiloo towards Den Helder	NS Intercity 3000	Zaandam towards Nijmegen
Heiloo towards Hoorn	NS Sprinter 4800	Uitgeest towards Amsterdam Centraal
Location
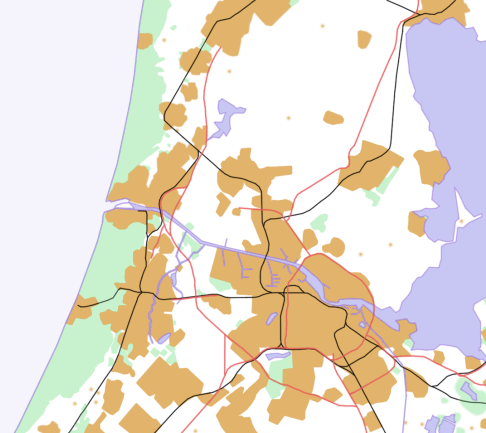
- Location within Northern Randstad Location within Netherlands

Castricum railway station is located in Castricum, the Netherlands.

== History ==
The station opened on 1 May 1867 as part of the Den Helder–Amsterdam railway. It was designed by Karel Hendrik van Brederode. The station was renovated in 1912, 1969 and in 2021. In the 2021 renovation the design focused on the relation with nearby Huis van Hilde and the tourism to the dune area.

== Train services ==
As of 1 January 2024, the following services call at Castricum:

- 2× per hour intercity service (Den Helder -) Alkmaar - Amsterdam - Utrecht - Eindhoven - Maastricht
- 2× per hour intercity service Den Helder - Amsterdam - Utrecht - Nijmegen
- 2× per hour local service (sprinter) Hoorn - Alkmaar - Uitgeest - Haarlem - Amsterdam

== Bus services ==
These services stop outside the station.

Operator	Line	Route
Connexxion	79	Castricum - Heemskerk - Beverwijk
Connexxion	164	Castricum - Bakkum - Egmond-Binnen - Egmond aan den Hoef - Egmond aan Zee
Connexxion	167	Alkmaar - Heiloo - Limmen - Castricum
