= Alkmaar railway station =

Station in the Netherlands

Alkmaar
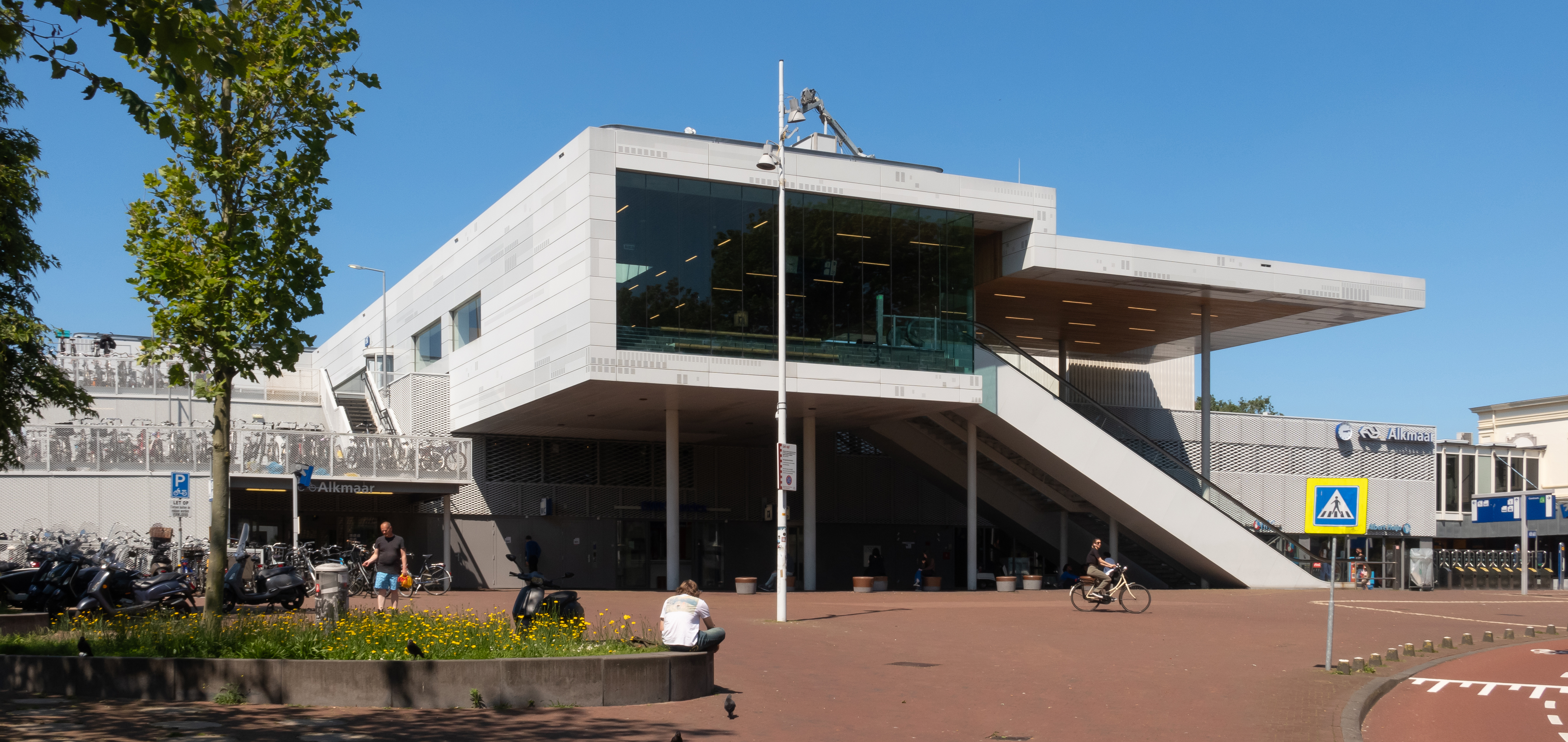

General information
- Location: Netherlands
- Coordinates: 52°38′16″N 4°44′26″E
- Line: Den Helder–Amsterdam railway

History
- Opened: 20 December 1865; 160 years ago

Services
Preceding station	Nederlandse Spoorwegen	Following station
Alkmaar Noord towards Den Helder	NS Intercity 2700 Peak hours only	Castricum towards Maastricht
Terminus	NS Intercity 2700 Mon-Thur until 19:00	Castricum towards Maastricht
Terminus	NS Intercity 2700 Fri-Sun until 19:00	Castricum towards Amsterdam Centraal
Alkmaar Noord towards Den Helder	NS Intercity 3000	Heiloo towards Nijmegen
Alkmaar Noord towards Hoorn	NS Sprinter 4800	Heiloo towards Amsterdam Centraal
Location
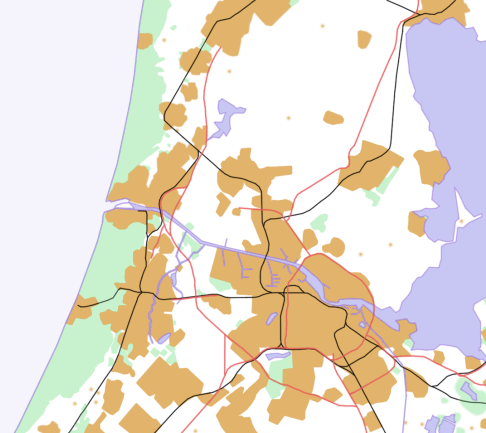
- Location within Northern Randstad Location within Netherlands

Alkmaar railway station serves the town of Alkmaar, Netherlands. It is located approximately 40 km (25 mi) northwest of Amsterdam. The station opened on 20 December 1865 and is located on the Den Helder–Amsterdam railway. The train services are operated by Nederlandse Spoorwegen and it is an Intercity station, where all trains stop.

== History ==
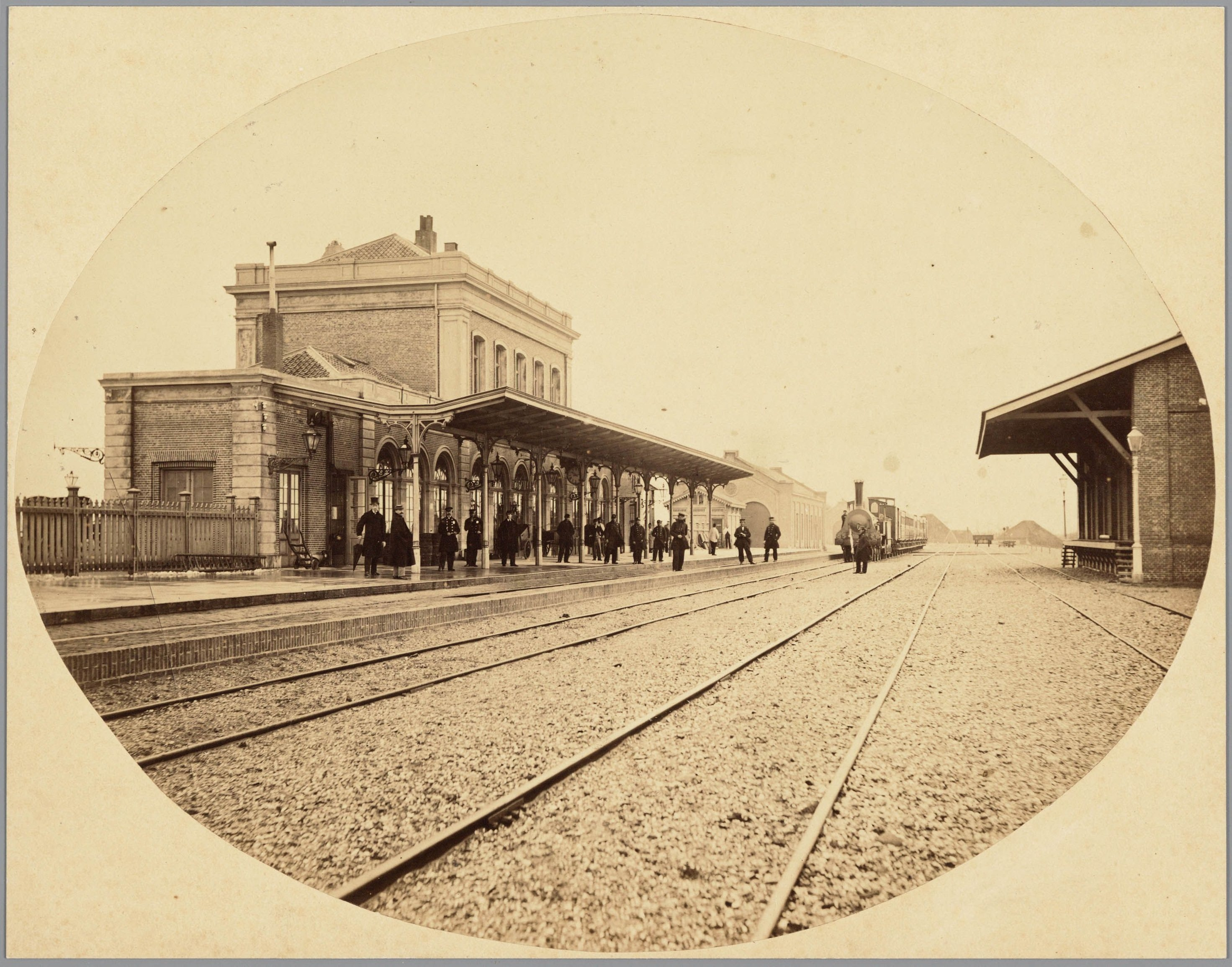
View of the station circa 1866

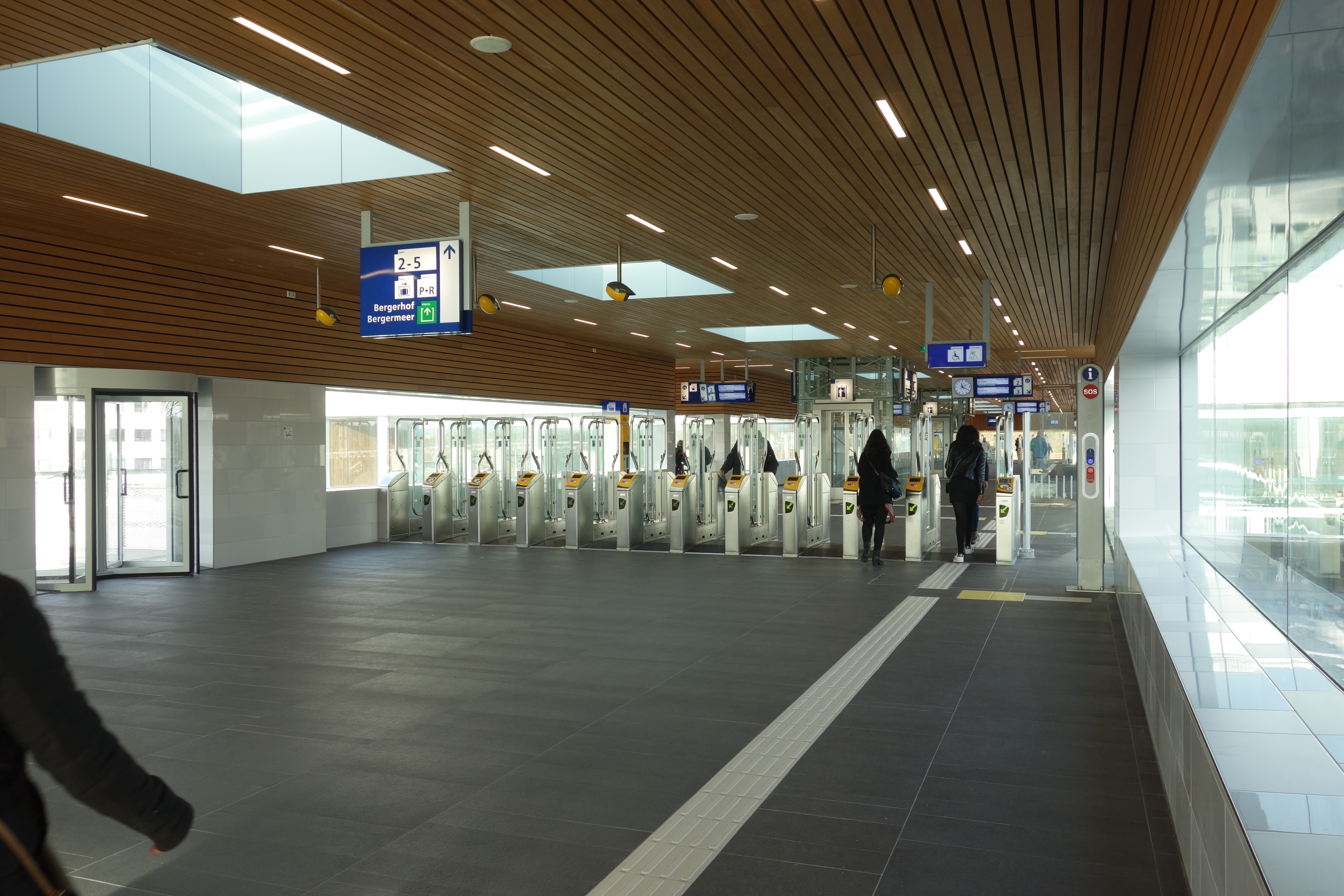
The entrance hall of the modernised station in 2015

Alkmaar Station opened on 20 December 1865 when the railway opened between Alkmaar and Den Helder. This was the second railway opened by the Hollandsche IJzeren Spoorweg-Maatschappij after the Amsterdam–Rotterdam railway. The line through Alkmaar was on the Staatslijn K railway, built by the Dutch state between 1865 and 1878.

The station building is a standard station building of the State Railways of the 1860s and was designed by Karel Hendrik van Brederode. The three other remaining station buildings of this style are in Harlingen, Leeuwarden and Winschoten. The station building of Alkmaar was expanded in 1879 and in 1908, by which time the entire building had two floors. A small extension was made on the south side of the station, making it asymmetrical. Following the middle part of the building was expanded forwards. In 1929, the north side of the station building was extended. In the 1960s, the station entrance was altered, the hall of the station gained a glass front.

The railway line from Amsterdam to Alkmaar was electrified in 1931. The line to Den Helder was electrified in 1958 and the line to Hoorn in 1974. Behind the platforms are 7 sidings, where trains are stabled between peak hours and at night.

Between 2014 and 2016, the north side of the station area was altered significantly. A new bridge has been built over the tracks which will connect the Bergerhof area and the station better. The tunnel under the platforms was closed as a result.

== Train services ==
The station is served by the following services:

- 2x per hour Intercity services (Schagen -) Alkmaar - Amsterdam - Utrecht - Eindhoven - Maastricht (not after 20:00 or on Sundays, operates to Schagen during peak hours)
- 2x per hour Intercity services Den Helder - Amsterdam - Utrecht - Arnhem - Nijmegen
- 2x per hour Intercity services Alkmaar - Haarlem (only on weekdays peak hours in the peak direction)
- 2x per hour Local services (Sprinter) Hoorn - Alkmaar - Uitgeest - Haarlem - Amsterdam

A night Sprinter service operates on the route between Amsterdam – Uitgeest – Alkmaar – Den Helder.

== Bus services ==
There is a bus station at the front of the station where the following bus services regularly depart from. All bus services are operated by Connexxion, except 350 which is operated by Qbuzz.

An overview of all bus lines as of May 4th 2025:

Line	Route	Via	Notes
Connexxion
2	Alkmaar Station - Vroonermeer-Noord	Huiswaard, 't Rak, Daalmeer	
4	Alkmaar Station - Daalmeer Rietschoot	Zeswielen, Station Noord, Vroonermeer	
5	Alkmaar Station - Daalmeer		Ring in one direction, opposite of line 6
6	Alkmaar Station - Daalmeer		Ring in one direction, opposite of line 5
8	Alkmaar Station - Overdie	NWZG, Oud-Overdie	
9	Alkmaar Station - Overdie	NWZG	
10	Alkmaar Station - Sint Pancras Kerkplein	Oudorp	
123	Alkmaar Station - Alkmaar Station	Schermer, Stompetoren, Schermerhorn, Grootscherner, Graft, De Rijp, West-Graftdijk	Ring running in both directions
129	Alkmaar Station - Purmerend Tramplein	Schermer, Stompetoren, Schermerhorn, Noordbeemster, Middenbeemster, Zuidoostbeemster	
151	Alkmaar Station - Sint Maartenszee Goudvis	Schoorl, Groet, Camperduin, Petten	
157	Alkmaar Station - Schagen Station	Schoorldam, Warmenhuizen, Tuitjenhorn, Dirkshorn	
160	Alkmaar Station - Heerhugowaard Centrumwaard		
162	Alkmaar Station - Heerhugowaard Icaruslaan		
163	Alkmaar Station - Uitgeest Station	NWZG, Akersloot	
165	Alkmaar Station - Egmond aan Zee Busstation	Egmond aan den Hoef	
166	Alkmaar Station - Bergen Plein		
167	Alkmaar Station - Castricum Station	NWZG, Heiloo, Limmen	
169	Alkmaar Station - Oudkarspel Haagwinde	Broek op Langedijk, Zuid- en Noord-Scharwoude	
251	Alkmaar Station - Petten EHC	Sint Maartensvlotbrug, Sint Maartenszee	Express service
260	Alkmaar Station - Heerhugowaard Stadshart		Express service
269	Alkmaar Station - Oudkarspel Haagwinde		Express service
606	Alkmaar Station - Bergen Europese School		School line
N50	Alkmaar Station → Den Oever Busstation	Broek op Langedijk, Zuid- en Noord-Scharwoude, Heerhugowaard, Nieuwe Niedorp, Middenmeer, Wieringerwerf	Night bus, only runs on saturday night
N60	Alkmaar Station - Heerhugowaard Centrumwaard		Night bus, only runs on saturday night
Qbuzz
350	Alkmaar Station - Leeuwarden Station	Heerhugowaard, Den Oever, Afsluitdijk	Qliner
