= Hoorn railway station =

Railway station in Hoorn, Netherlands

Hoorn
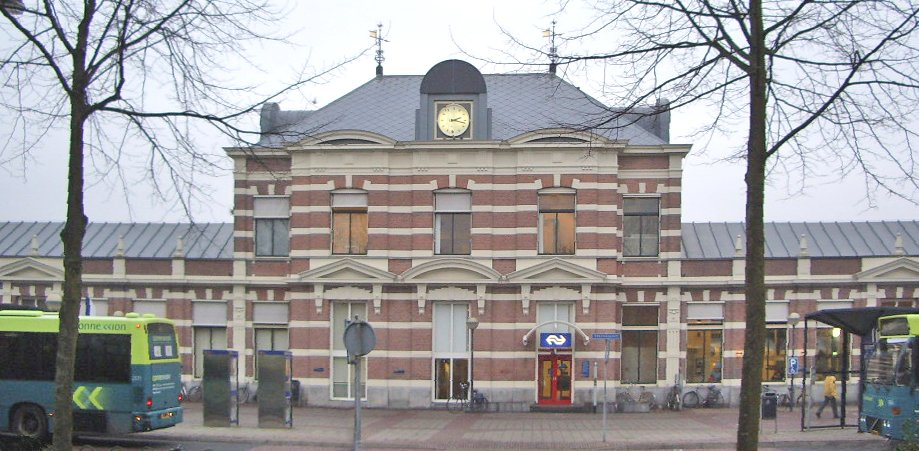

General information
- Location: Hoorn, Netherlands
- Coordinates: 52°38′42″N 5°03′17″E
- Lines: Zaandam–Enkhuizen railway Heerhugowaard–Hoorn railway

History
- Opened: 20 May 1884; 142 years ago

Services
Preceding station	Nederlandse Spoorwegen	Following station
Amsterdam Sloterdijk towards Maastricht	NS Intercity 2900 After 19:00 and Fri-Sun only	Hoorn Kersenboogerd towards Enkhuizen
Purmerend towards Amsterdam Centraal	NS Intercity 3700 Mon-Thur Peak Only	Hoorn Kersenboogerd towards Enkhuizen
Amsterdam Sloterdijk towards Heerlen	NS Intercity 3900 Mon-Thur before 19:00	Hoorn Kersenboogerd towards Enkhuizen
Purmerend Overwhere towards Hoofddorp	NS Sprinter 4100	Hoorn Kersenboogerd Terminus
Obdam towards Amsterdam Centraal	NS Sprinter 4800	Terminus
Location
- Location within Netherlands

Hoorn (Dutch: [ˈɦoːr(ə)n]) is the main railway station of the town of Hoorn, Netherlands. It is on the Zaandam–Enkhuizen railway and Heerhugowaard–Hoorn railway.

== Overview ==
The station opened on 20 May 1884 as part of the Zaandam–Hoorn railway line. On 6 June 1885 the line was extended to Enkhuizen. Other lines that opened were the Hoorn - Medemblik line in 1887, and the Hoorn - Heerhugowaard line in October 1898. The station has a ticket hall, a florist, a music shop and a restaurant.

In 1985 another station opened in Hoorn, to the east, Hoorn Kersenboogerd. Now behind the station is the steam railway from Hoorn - Medemblik, the Steamtrain Hoorn Medemblik. From 8 May 2009 the Stoptrein 3300 was cut between Hoorn and Hoorn Kersenboogerd, but returned in December 2009

== Train services ==
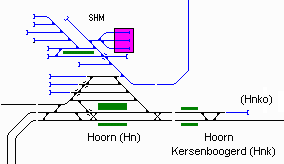
Layout of Hoorn station

The following services currently call at Hoorn:

- 2x per hour intercity service Enkhuizen - Hoorn - Amsterdam - Hilversum - Amersfoort (-Deventer)
- 2x per hour intercity service Enkhuizen - Hoorn - Amsterdam (peak hours)
- 2x per hour local service (sprinter) Hoofddorp - Schiphol - Zaandam - Hoorn Kersenboogerd
- 2x per hour local service (sprinter) Hoorn - Alkmaar - Uitgeest - Haarlem - Amsterdam

== Bus services ==
Buses depart from the bus station outside the station. Services are operated by Connexxion, with the exception of 314 and 317, which are operated by EBS (subsidiary of Egged).

Line	Route
Connexxion
11	Station - Centre - Risdam - Risdam-Noord - Nibbixwoud - Midwoud - Abbekerk)
12	Station - Risdam-Zuid - Wognum - Spanbroek - Opmeer - Hoogwoud)
13	Station - Centre - Risdam - Zwaag - Oosterblokker - Blokker - Kersenboogerd)
14	Station - Hoorn South-east - Kerseboogerd Station - Kersenboogerd East)
128	Station - Grote Noord - Berkhout - Avenhorn - Noordbeemster)
131	Station - Nieuwe Steen - Westfrisia Industrial Estate - Wevershoof)
132	Station - Nieuwe Steen - Zwaag - Zwaagdijk-Oost - Wevershoof - Andijk)
134	Station - Abbekerk - Lambertschaag - Middenmeer - Wieringerwerf)
135	Station - Abbekerk - Middenmeer - Wieringerwerf - Den Oever - Den Helder)
139	Station - Centrum - Risdam - Risdam-Noord - Abbekerk - Opperdoes - Medemblik)
239	Station - Abbekerk - Opperdoes - Medemblik)
412	Station - Centrum - Nieuwe Steen - Schellinkhout - Wijdenes - Hem - Venhuizen - Hoogkarspel - Lutjebroek - Grootebroek)
415	Station - Centrum - Risdam - Zwaagdijk-West - Hauwert - Oostwoud - Twisk - Medemblik - Onderdijk - Wevershoof)
EBS
314	Station - Grote Waal - Scharwoude - Oosthuizen - Edam - Amsterdam)
317	Station - Grote Waal - Scharwoude - Oosthuizen - Edam - Amsterdam) peak hours only, limited stop
