= Amsterdam–Schiphol railway =

Railway line in the Netherlands

Amsterdam-Schiphol railway Westtak Ringspoorbaan
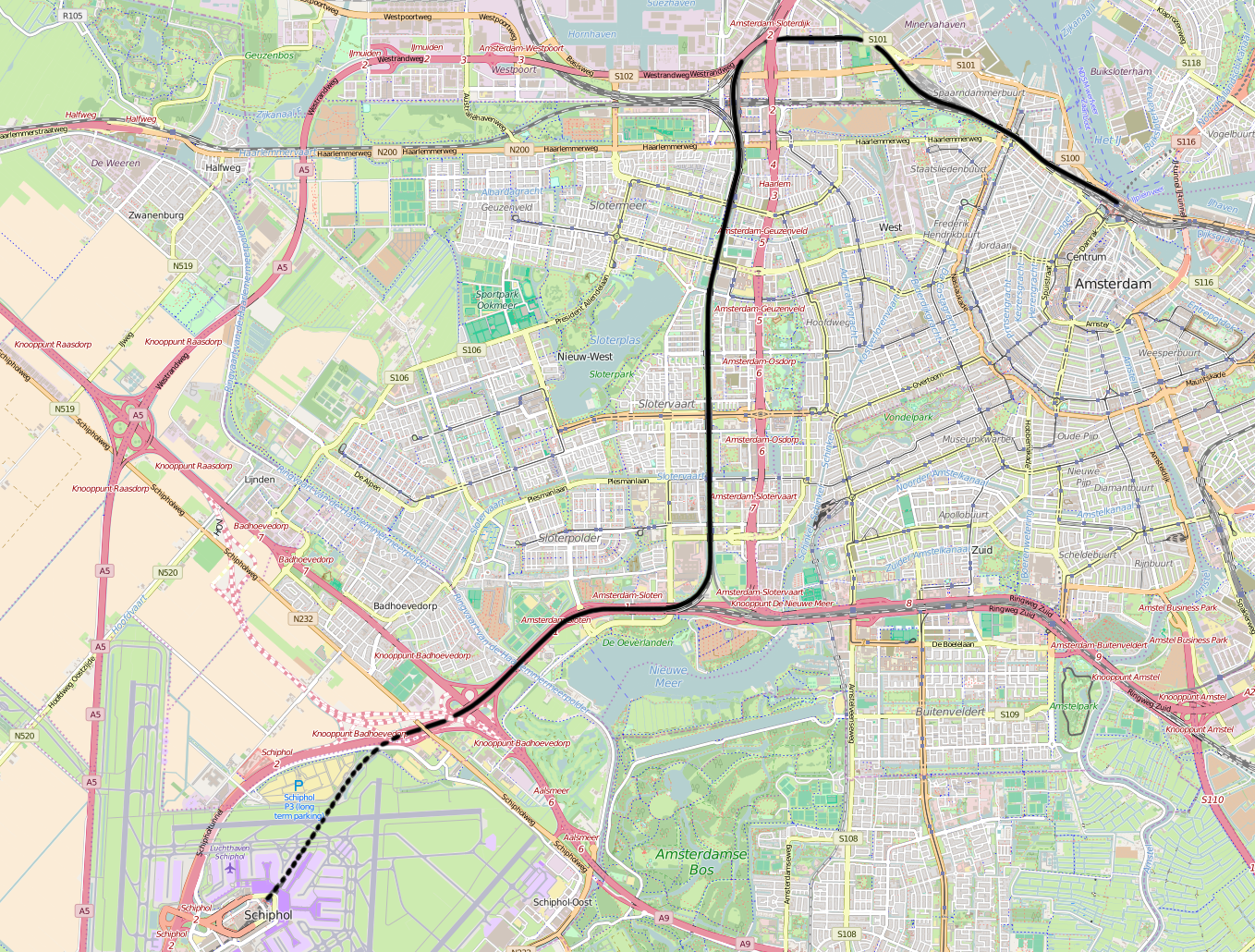
- Map of the Amsterdam–Schiphol railway

Overview
- Status: Operational
- Owner: ProRail
- Locale: Netherlands
- Termini: Amsterdam Centraal; Schiphol
- Stations: 4

Service
- Operator: Nederlandse Spoorwegen

History
- Opened: 1 June 1986

Technical
- Line length: 17.1 km (10.6 mi)
- Number of tracks: Double track
- Track gauge: 1,435 mm (4 ft 8 1/2 in) standard gauge
- Electrification: 1.5 kV DC
- Operating speed: 130 km/h (81 mph)

The Amsterdam–Schiphol railway (also known as the Westtak Ringspoorbaan) is an important 17 kilometre long railway line in the Netherlands that connects Amsterdam with Amsterdam Airport Schiphol, and allows trains to continue to Leiden, The Hague, and Rotterdam.

== History ==
The railway was opened by the Nederlandse Spoorwegen on 1 June 1986. The line prompted the opening of three new stations Amsterdam Sloterdijk, Amsterdam De Vlugtlaan and Amsterdam Lelylaan.

A fourth station, Amsterdam Aletta Jacobslaan, was planned but it was never opened; today, the Metro station Henk Sneevlietweg is situated on the proposed site.

In 1997 the Metro line 50 opened, running parallel with the line between Isolatorweg (between Amsterdam Centraal and Sloterdijk) and Henk Sneevlietweg (south of Amsterdam Lelylaan).

De Vlugtlaan station was closed in 2000 as part of the project to open the Hemboog which would link Schiphol with North Holland.

== Route ==
The Amsterdam-Schiphol line leaves Amsterdam Centraal in a westerly direction. It passes Zaanstraat depot 2 km (1.2 mi) from Amsterdam Centraal, where the Oude Lijn towards Haarlem diverges. Shortly afterwards the freight-only branch line to Westhaven also diverges. 4 km (2.5 mi) out of Amsterdam Centraal, the metro line starts at Isolatorweg, running parallel to the Schiphol railway for 5 km (3.1 mi). The railway and metro both turn toward the south before reaching the bi-level Amsterdam Sloterdijk station. Here, the platforms on the line to Schiphol and the metro platforms are above the bottom lines for Haarlem and Zaandam. South of the station, the Hemboog with the line from Zaandam joins, passing through the former Amsterdam De Vlugtlaan station, which is now served only by the metro. 1.5 km (0.93 mi) after Amsterdam Lelylaan station, the metro line branches off to the east towards Amsterdam Zuid, while the line towards Schiphol branches off to the west, where it joins the Weesp–Leiden railway (also known as the original Schiphollijn) coming from Amsterdam Zuid. For 3 km (1.9 mi) the line runs in the median of the A4 motorway, before diving into the tunnel to Schiphol Airport railway station, located under the airport terminal. From Schiphol the line continues as the Schiphollijn to Leiden.

== Services ==
The Amsterdam–Schiphol railway is used by the following passenger services:

- International services (Amsterdam – Brussels – Paris – London; Amsterdam – Brussels – Paris)
- Intercity Direct high speed services (Amsterdam – Rotterdam – Breda; Amsterdam – Rotterdam)
- Intercity services (Amsterdam – Dordrecht – Vlissingen; Lelystad – Den Haag Centraal; Groningen – Den Haag Centraal)
- Local services (Hoorn – Hoofddorp; Utrecht – Den Haag Centraal; Amersfoort Vathorst – Hoofddorp)

== Types ==
A wide variety of trains can be found regularly on the Amsterdam–Schiphol railway:

- British Rail Class 374 on the Amsterdam – London Eurostar service
- Thalys PBA or Thalys PBKA on the Amsterdam – Paris Thalys service
- NS Class 186 on the Amsterdam – Breda and Amsterdam – Rotterdam Intercity Direct services
- NS DD-IRM on the Amsterdam – Vlissingen and Amsterdam – Den Haag Centraal services
- NS Sprinter on the Hoorn – Hoofddorp service between Amsterdam Sloterdijk and Schiphol Airport
- NID/DDZ on the Amsterdam – Vlissingen; Amsterdam – Den Haag Centraal; Hoorn – Hoofddorp services
- SLT on the Hoofdorp – Hoorn and Amersfoort Vathorst – Hoofddorp services
