= Amsterdam Aletta Jacobslaan railway station =

Planned railway station in Amsterdam

Amsterdam Aletta Jacobslaan

General information
- Location: Netherlands
- Coordinates: 52°20′49″N 4°50′04″E
- Line: Amsterdam–Schiphol railway
Location
- Location within Netherlands

Amsterdam Aletta Jacobslaan was a planned railway station in Amsterdam, Netherlands. The station was to be built on the Amsterdam–Schiphol railway on the site of the current Henk Sneevlietweg—a station on the Amsterdam Metro.

== See also ==
- Henk Sneevlietweg railway station
- Amsterdam–Schiphol railway
- Rail transport in the Netherlands
