= Postjesweg metro station =

Metro station in Amsterdam, Netherlands

Coordinates: 52°21′52″N 4°50′02″E

Postjesweg
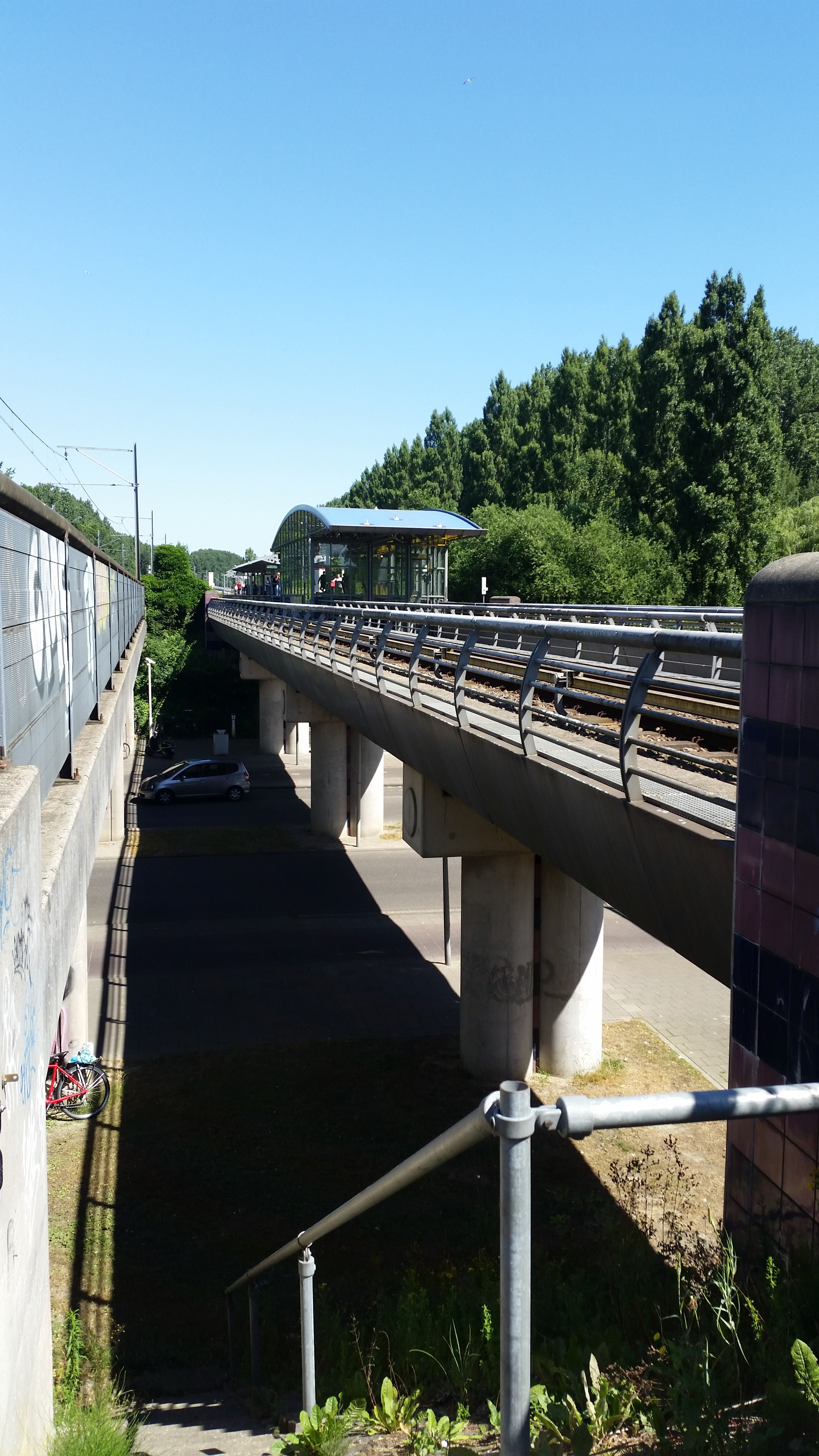
- Postjesweg metro station

General information
- Operator: Gemeente Vervoerbedrijf
- Platforms: 1 island platform
- Tracks: 2

Other information
- Station code: PJW

History
- Opened: 28 May 1997; 29 years ago

Services
Preceding station	Amsterdam Metro	Following station
Station Lelylaan towards Gein	Line 50	Jan van Galenstraat towards Isolatorweg
Station Lelylaan towards Centraal Station	Line 51	Jan van Galenstraat towards Isolatorweg
Location
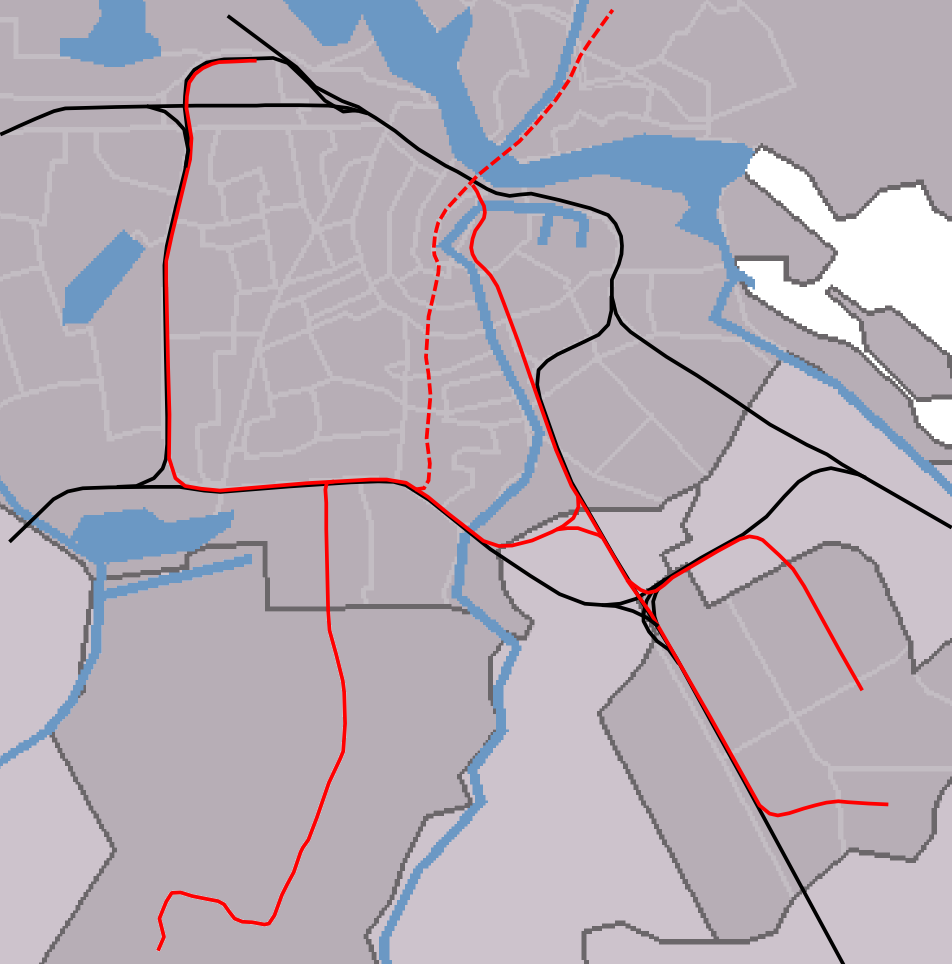
- Location within metro van Amsterdam

Postjesweg is a metro station in Amsterdam Nieuw-West and is served by GVB metro line 50 and 51. There is also a bus stop of line 18 at the north side of the main entrance.

== Bus Services ==
This service is operated by GVB

- 18 Slotervaart - Mercatorplein - Bos en Lommer - Haarlemmerplein - Centraal Station
