= Jan van Galenstraat metro station =

Metro station in Amsterdam

Jan van Galenstraat
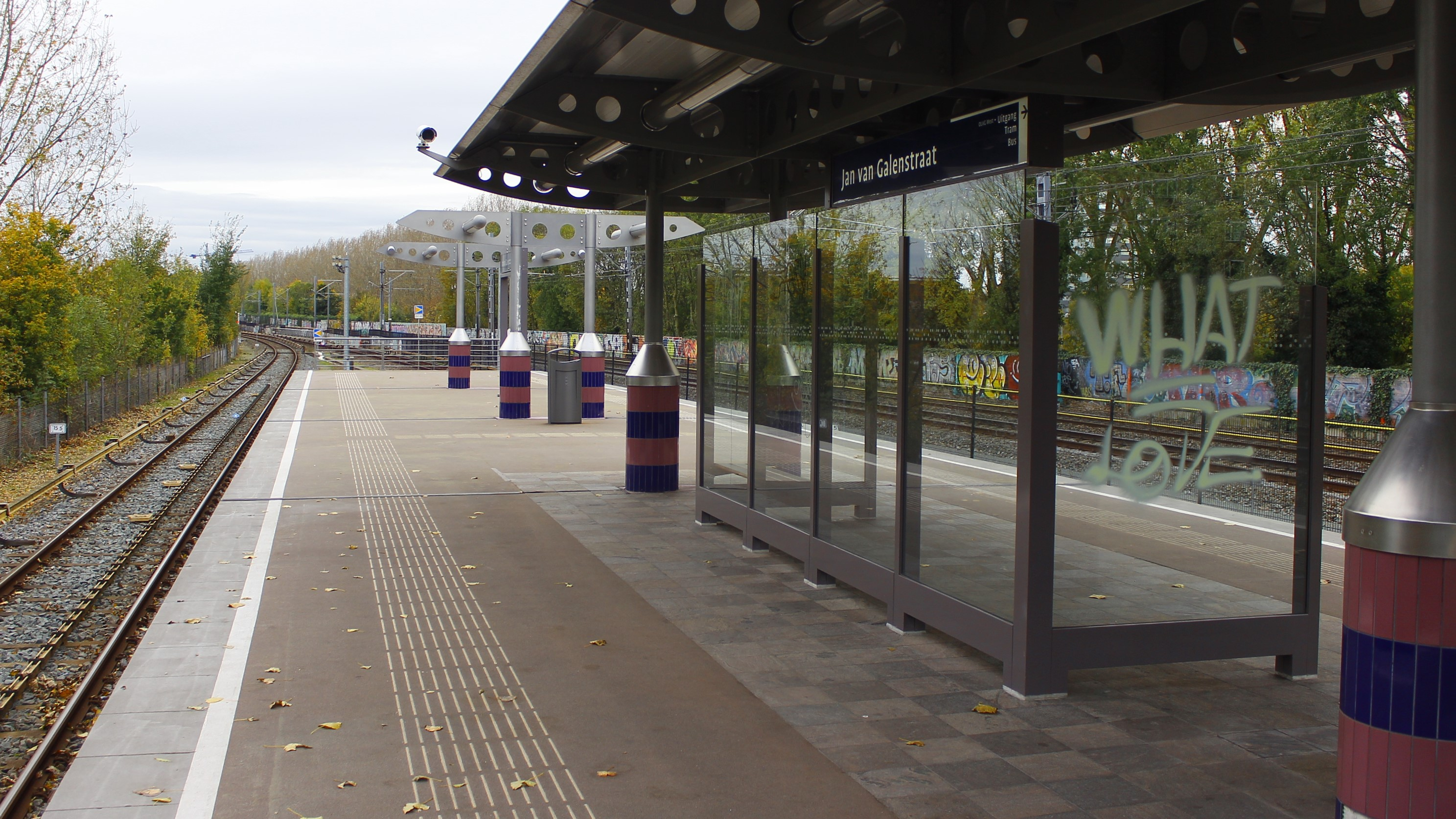

General information
- Location: Amsterdam, Netherlands
- Coordinates: 52°22′21″N 4°50′7″E
- Operator: GVB
- Line: 50
- Platforms: 1 island platform
- Tracks: 2

Other information
- Station code: JLS

History
- Opened: 28 May 1997; 29 years ago

Services
Preceding station	Amsterdam Metro	Following station
Postjesweg towards Gein	Line 50	De Vlugtlaan towards Isolatorweg
Postjesweg towards Centraal Station	Line 51	De Vlugtlaan towards Isolatorweg
Location
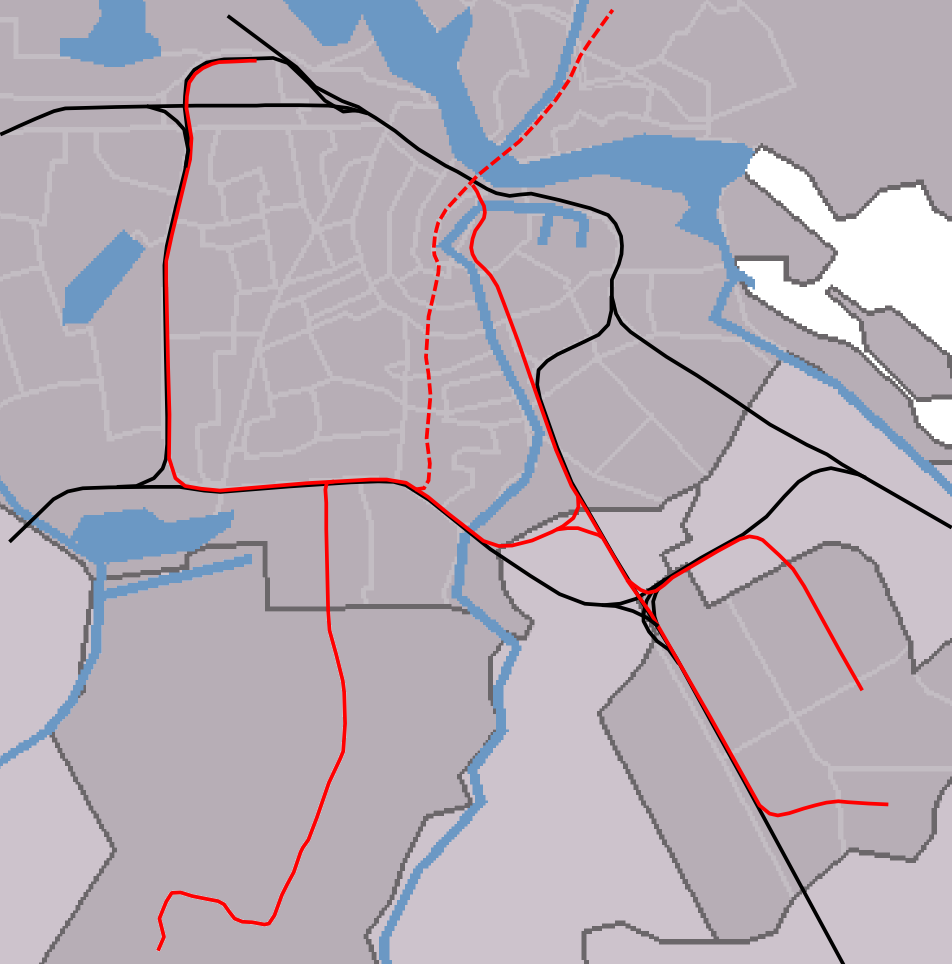
- Location within metro van Amsterdam

Jan van Galenstraat metro station is a station of the Amsterdam Metro's Route 50 (Ringlijn) and Route 51. It was opened on 28 May 1997 and is named after Commodore Jan van Galen who served under the Dutch Republic. Near the station are located the OLVG West (also known as Sint Lucas Andreas Hospital), Student Hotel Amsterdam West and Sports Hall Jan van Galen. There is a Tram-stop right by the main entrance.

== Tram Services ==
The following services call at Jan van Galenstraat:

- 13 Geuzenveld - Mercatorplein - Marnixstraat - Westermarkt - Dam - Centraal Station
