= Amsterdam Centraal station =

Railway station in the Netherlands

Amsterdam Centraal
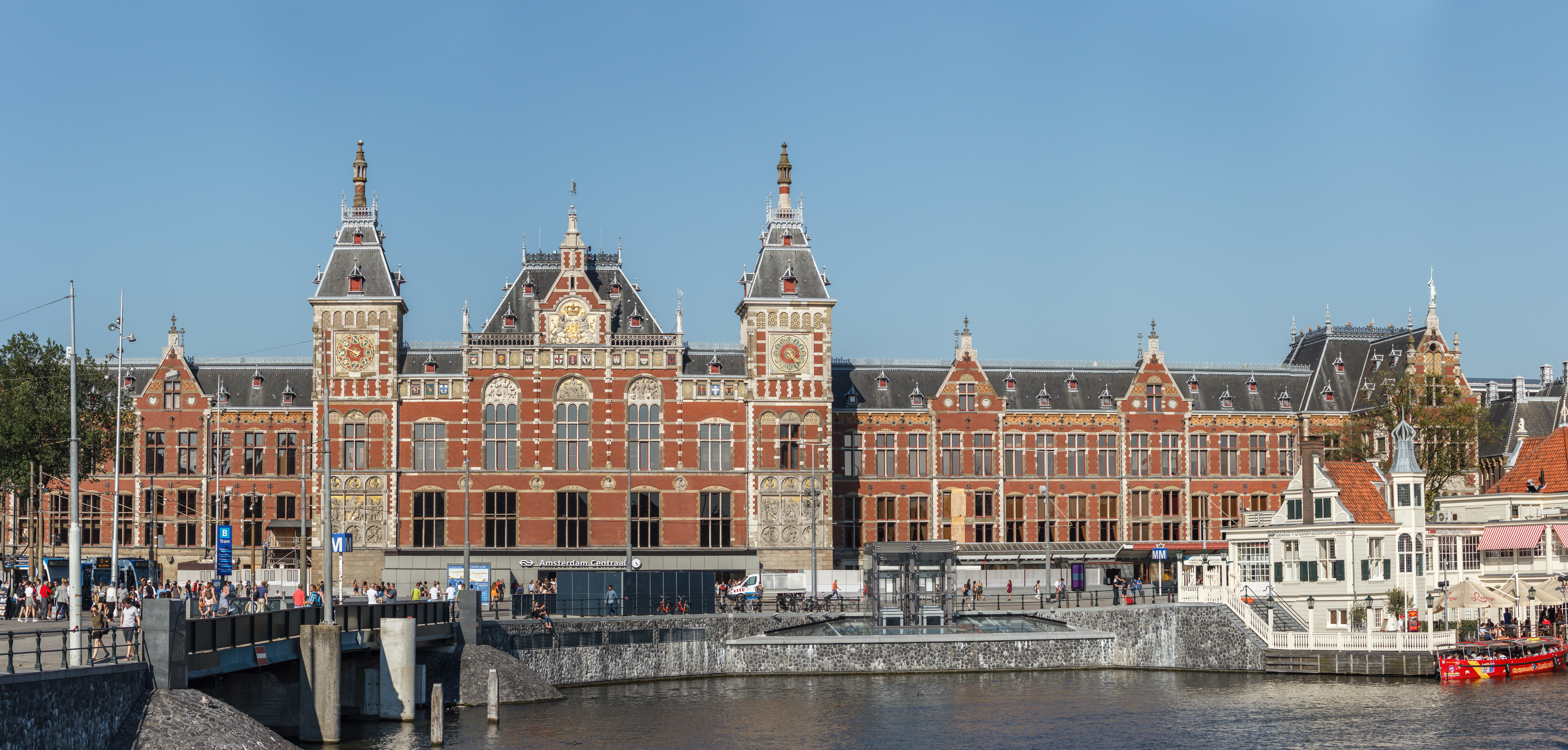
- Station building in 2016

General information
- Location: Stationsplein 15; Amsterdam; Netherlands
- Coordinates: 52°22′42″N 4°54′0″E
- Operator: Nederlandse Spoorwegen; NS International; Arriva; DB Fernverkehr; Eurostar; European Sleeper; ÖBB Nightjet
- Lines: Amsterdam–Elten railway; Amsterdam–Rotterdam railway; Amsterdam–Schiphol railway; Amsterdam–Zutphen railway; Den Helder–Amsterdam railway; Nieuwediep–Amsterdam railway
- Platforms: 11
- Tracks: 15
- Connections: Metro: 51 52 53 54; Tram: 2, 4, 12, 13, 14, 17, 24, 26; Ferry: F2, F3, F4; : 391, 394, N47, N57, N92, N94, N97; : 305, 306, 314, 316, N01, N04, N10, N14; : 18, 21, 22, 43, 48, 248, N81, N82, N83, N84, N85, N86, N87, N88, N89, N91, N93

Construction
- Architect: Pierre Cuypers

Other information
- Station code: Asd
- IATA code: ZYA
- Website: ns.nl/stationsinformatie/asd/amsterdam-centraal

History
- Opened: 15 October 1889; 136 years ago

Passengers
- 192,178 daily (2018)
Services
| Preceding station | Eurostar | Following station |
|---|---|---|
| Rotterdam Centraal towards London | Eurostar | Terminus |
| Schiphol Airport towards Paris-Nord | Eurostar | Terminus |
| Schiphol Airport towards Disneyland Paris, Marseille or Bourg-Saint-Maurice | Eurostar | Terminus |
| Schiphol Airport towards Bourg-Saint-Maurice | Eurostar (winter) | Terminus |
| Schiphol Airport towards Marseille-Saint-Charles | Eurostar (summer) | Terminus |
| Preceding station | DB Fernverkehr | Following station |
| Terminus | ICE 77 | Hilversum towards Berlin Ostbahnhof |
| Terminus | ICE 78 | Utrecht Centraal towards Frankfurt (Main) Hbf or München Hbf |
| Preceding station | ÖBB | Following station |
| Terminus | Nightjet | Amersfoort Centraal towards Innsbruck Hbf or Wien Hbf |
| Terminus | Nightjet | Utrecht Centraal towards Zürich HB |
| Preceding station | European Sleeper | Following station |
| Den Haag HS towards Brussels-South | Brussels–Prague | Amersfoort Centraal towards Prague |
| Preceding station | NS International | Following station |
| Schiphol Airport towards Brussels-South | Eurocity 9200 | Terminus |
| Preceding station | Nederlandse Spoorwegen | Following station |
| Leiden Centraal towards Rotterdam Centraal | NS Nachtnet 1400 Tuesday night | Amsterdam Bijlmer ArenA towards Utrecht Centraal |
| Schiphol Airport towards Rotterdam Centraal | NS Nachtnet 1400 except Tues, Wed night | Utrecht Centraal Terminus |
| Terminus | NS Intercity 1500 | Hilversum towards Deventer |
| Amsterdam Sloterdijk towards Den Haag Centraal | NS Intercity 2100 | Terminus |
| Amsterdam Sloterdijk towards Vlissingen | NS Intercity 2200 | Terminus |
| Amsterdam Sloterdijk towards Vlissingen | NS Intercity 2300 Mon-Fri until 20:00 | Terminus |
| Terminus | NS Intercity 2600 | Almere Centrum Terminus |
| Amsterdam Sloterdijk towards Alkmaar | NS Intercity 2700 Mon-Thur until 19:00 | Amsterdam Amstel towards Maastricht |
| Amsterdam Sloterdijk towards Alkmaar | NS Intercity 2700 Fri-Sun until 19:00 | Terminus |
| Amsterdam Sloterdijk towards Enkhuizen | NS Intercity 2900 After 19:00 and Fri-Sun only | Amsterdam Amstel towards Maastricht |
| Amsterdam Sloterdijk towards Den Helder | NS Intercity 3000 | Amsterdam Amstel towards Nijmegen |
| Amsterdam Sloterdijk towards Enkhuizen | NS Intercity 3700 Mon-Thur Peak Only | Terminus |
| Amsterdam Sloterdijk towards Enkhuizen | NS Intercity 3900 Mon-Thurs until 19:30 | Amsterdam Amstel towards Heerlen |
| Schiphol Airport towards Rotterdam Centraal | NS Nachtnet 11400 Wednesday Night only | Utrecht Centraal Terminus |
| Haarlem Terminus | NS Nachtnet 21460 Fri, Sat night only | Terminus |
| Amsterdam Sloterdijk towards Uitgeest | NS Sprinter 4000 | Amsterdam Muiderpoort towards Rotterdam Centraal |
| Terminus | NS Sprinter 4600 Not after 20:00 | Amsterdam Muiderpoort towards Almere Oostvaarders |
| Amsterdam Sloterdijk towards Hoorn | NS Sprinter 4800 | Terminus |
| Amsterdam Sloterdijk towards Zandvoort | NS Sprinter 5400 | Terminus |
| Terminus | NS Sprinter 5800 | Amsterdam Muiderpoort towards Amersfoort Vathorst |
| Amsterdam Sloterdijk towards Uitgeest | NS Sprinter 7400 Peak hours only | Amsterdam Muiderpoort towards Driebergen-Zeist |
| Amsterdam Sloterdijk towards Hoofddorp | NS Sprinter 8100 | Terminus |
| Amsterdam Sloterdijk towards Hoofddorp | NS Sprinter 8200 | Terminus |
| Amsterdam Sloterdijk towards Hoofddorp | NS Sprinter 8300 | Terminus |
| Amsterdam Sloterdijk towards Hoofddorp | NS Sprinter 8400 | Terminus |
| Preceding station | Arriva Netherlands | Following station |
| Schiphol Airport Terminus | Nachttrein 32710 Friday night only | Amsterdam Bijlmer ArenA towards Maastricht |
| Schiphol Airport Terminus | Nachttrein 32780 Friday night only | Almere Centrum towards Groningen |
Location
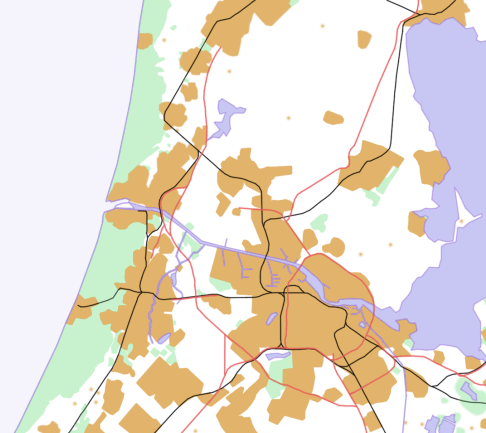
- Location within Northern Randstad Location within Netherlands

Amsterdam Centraal station (Dutch: Station Amsterdam Centraal, lit. 'Amsterdam Central Station', Dutch pronunciation: [staːˈɕɔn ˌɑmstərˈdɑm sɛnˈtraːl], abbreviation: Asd) is the largest railway station in Amsterdam, North Holland, the Netherlands. A major international railway hub, it is used by 192,000 passengers a day, making it the second busiest railway station in the country after Utrecht Centraal and the most visited Rijksmonument of the Netherlands.

National and international railway services at Amsterdam Centraal are provided by NS (Nederlandse Spoorwegen), the principal rail operator in the Netherlands. Amsterdam Centraal is the northern terminus of Amsterdam Metro lines 51, 53, 54, and is a stop on Line 52 operated by municipal public transport operator GVB. It is also served by a number of GVB tram and ferry routes as well as local and regional bus routes operated by GVB, Connexxion and EBS.

Amsterdam Centraal was designed by Dutch architect Pierre Cuypers and opened in 1889. It features a Gothic, Renaissance Revival station building and a cast iron platform roof spanning approximately 40 metres (130 ft).

Since 1997, the station building, underground passages, metro station, and the surrounding area have been undergoing major reconstruction and renovation works to accommodate the North-South Line metro route, which opened on 22 July 2018. Amsterdam Centraal has the second longest railway platform in the Netherlands with a length of 695 metres (2,280 ft). Due to the length, each platform may serve two trains, while one embarks from side "a" of a platform and the other, from side "b".

== History ==
=== Construction ===
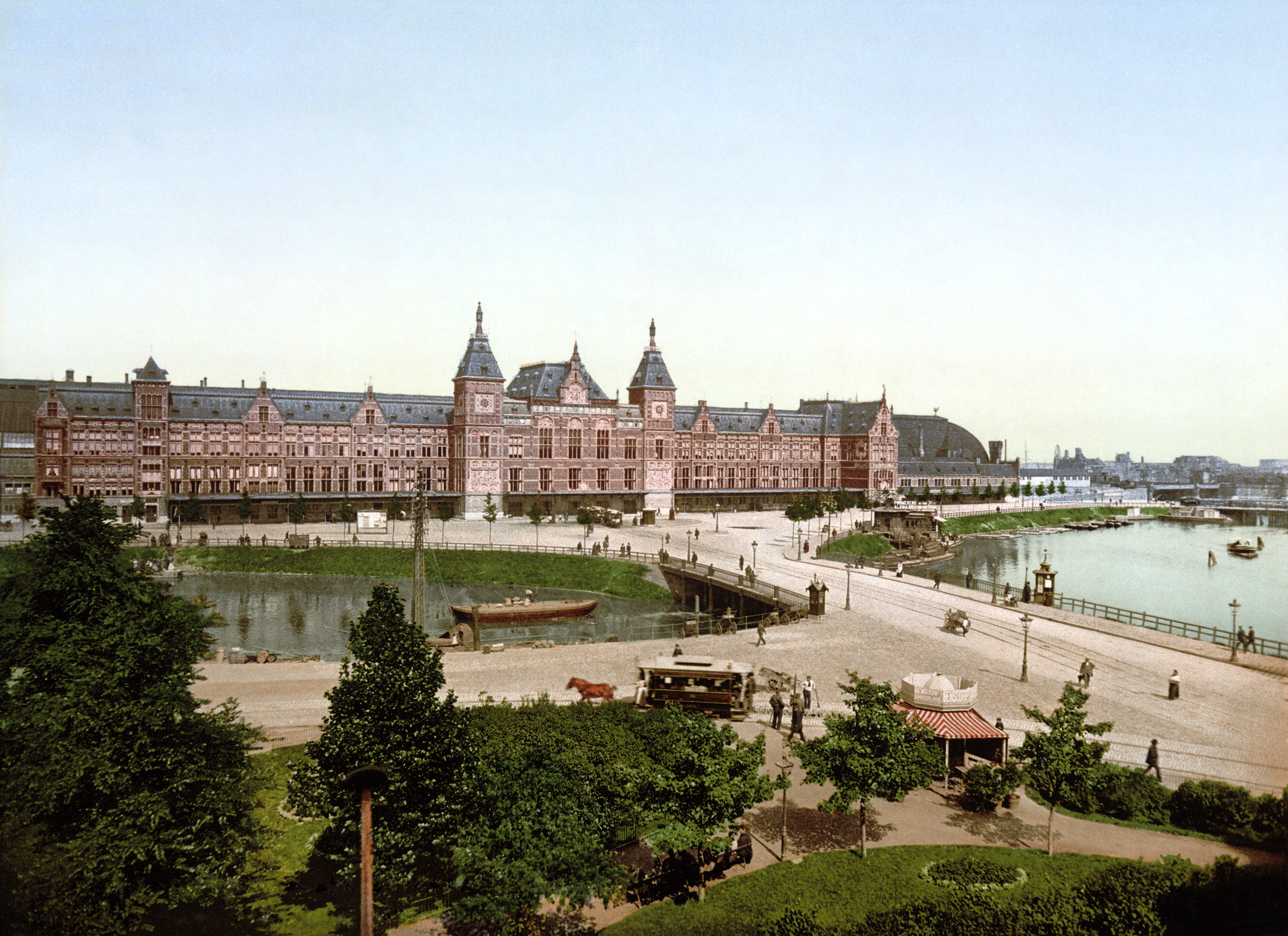
Amsterdam Centraal station, designed by Pierre Cuypers, c. 1890–1900.

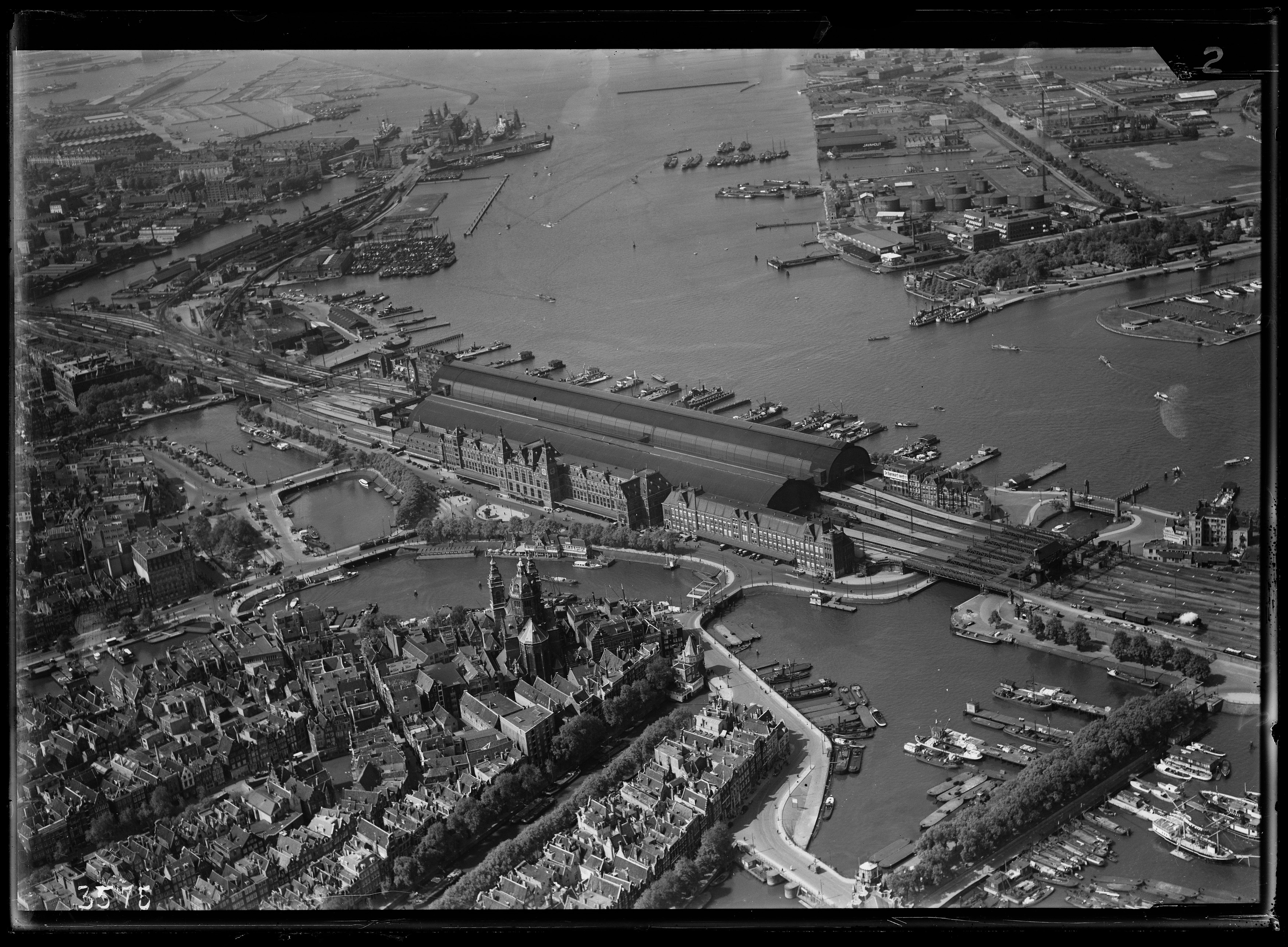
Aerial photograph of Amsterdam Central station, 1920–1940.

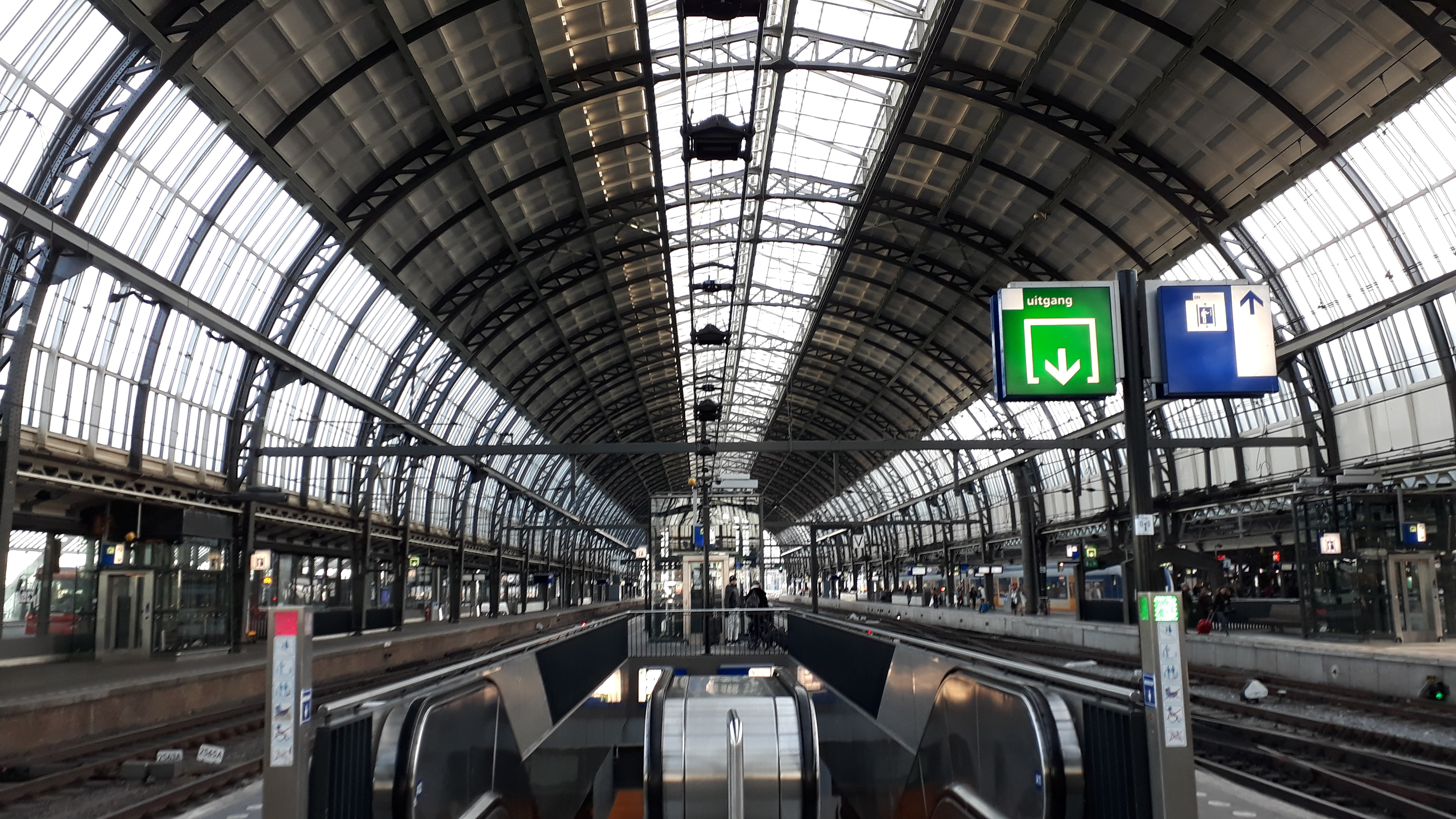
First station roof (1889), designed by L.J. Eijmer

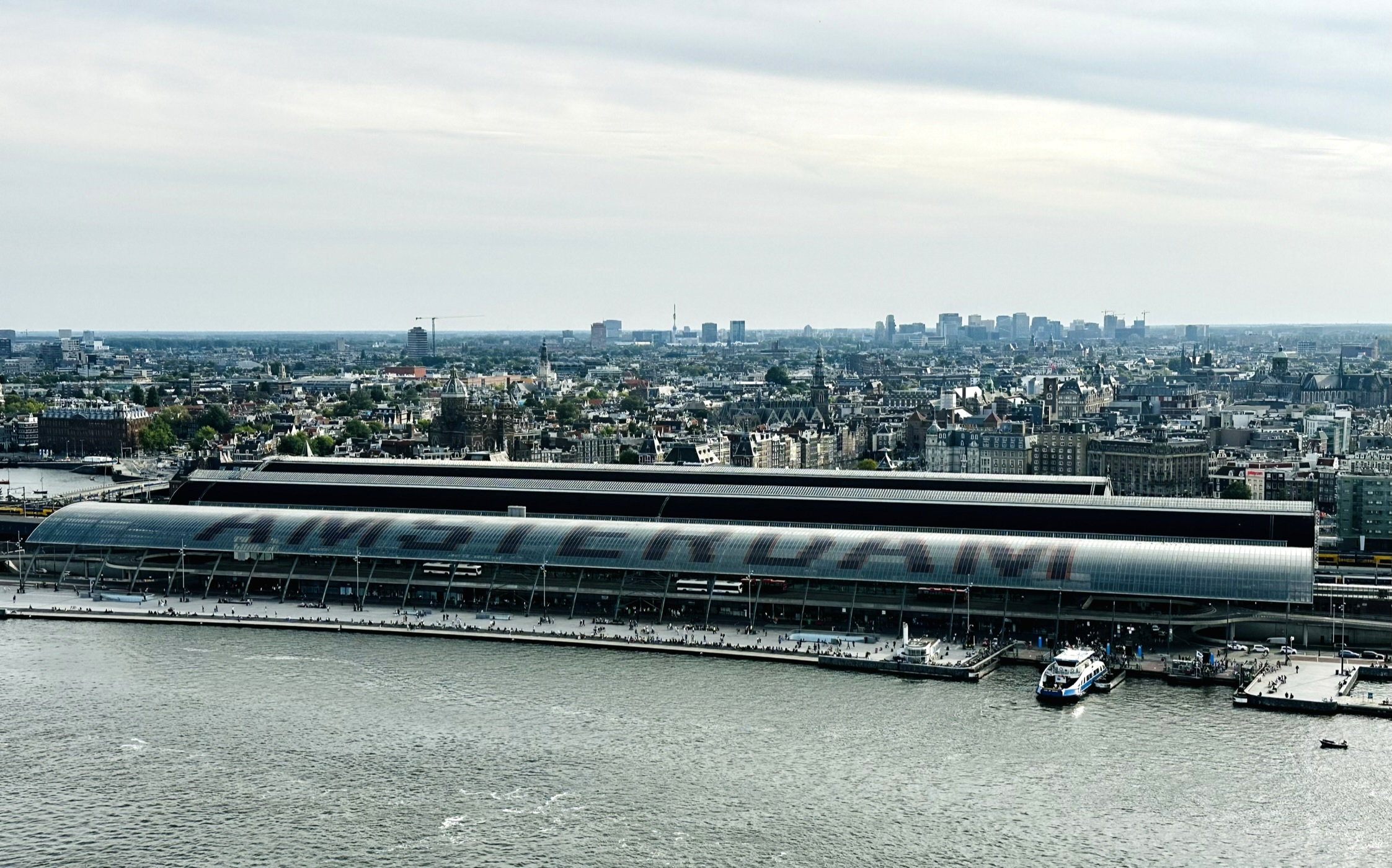
The station viewed from the A'DAM Tower (originally the Shell Tower)

Amsterdam Centraal was designed by Pierre Cuypers, who is also known for his design of the Rijksmuseum in Amsterdam. While Cuypers was the principal architect, it is believed that he focused mostly on the decoration of the station building and left the structural design to railway engineers. The station was built by contractor Philipp Holzmann.

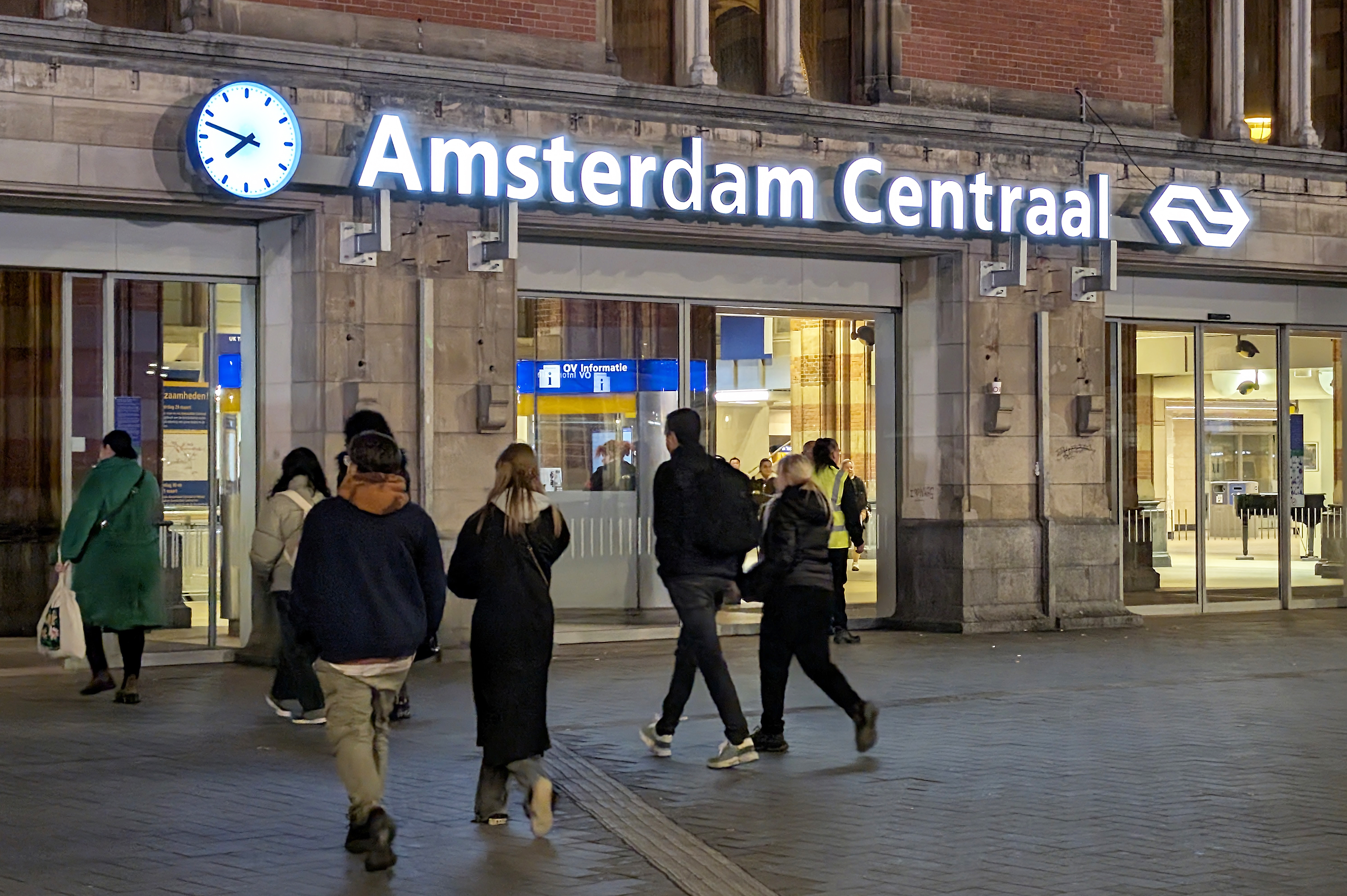
Centrumzijde (cityside) entrance to Amsterdam Centraal station in April 2025.

The new central station replaced Amsterdam Willemspoort Station, which had closed in 1878, as well as the temporary Westerdok Station used from 1878 to 1889. The idea for a central station came from Johan Rudolph Thorbecke, then the Netherlands Minister of the Interior and responsible for the national railways, who, in 1884, laid two proposals before the Amsterdam municipal council. In the first proposal, the station would be situated between the Leidseplein and the Amstel river. In the other, it would be built in the open harbour front allowing for the station to be connected to the existing main lines in the area to the west and the south, but also to a projected new northern line.

Cuypers' design of the station building in many ways strongly resembled his other architectural masterpiece, the Rijksmuseum, of which the construction had begun in 1876. It features a palace-like, Gothic/Renaissance Revival facade, with two turrets and many ornamental details and stone reliefs referring to the capital city's industrial and commercial importance. A royal waiting room for the Dutch monarchy (one of three in active use in the country today) was also included in the design. Cuypers' station reflects the romantic nationalistic mood in the late nineteenth-century Netherlands, with its many decorative elements glorifying the nation's economic and colonial power at the time.

As with the Rijksmuseum, the station's overall architecture reminded many contemporaries of medieval cathedrals. For that reason, as well as for the fact that it became increasingly clear that the national government wanted the station to be built at the city's waterfront effectively separating the city from the IJ lake, the plan was highly controversial. In his book on the history of city, Amsterdam historian Geert Mak writes that:

Almost all of Amsterdam's own experts and others involved thought this to be a catastrophic plan, 'the most disgusting possible attack on the beauty and glory of the capital'. Nevertheless, the building of the Central Station in front of the open harbour was forced through by the railway department of the Ministry of Transport in The Hague, and the Home Secretary, Thorbecke. Finally, the plan made its way through the Amsterdam municipal council by a narrow majority.

Construction works started in 1882. The station is built on three interconnected artificial islands in the IJ lake. These islands were created with sand taken from the dunes near Velsen, which had become available as a result of the excavation of the North Sea Canal. The islands together are known as Stationseiland (Station Island). Like many other structures in Amsterdam, the station was built on wooden piles (8,687 pieces). The construction of the station was delayed because of the instability of the soil, which set back the completion of the work by several years. The station building was completed in 1884, but the commission to Cuypers did not include the roofwork of the platforms. Therefore, the station did not yet feature its distinctive station roof. This roof, consisting of 50 curved trusses and a span of almost 45 meters (147 ft 8 in), was designed by L.J. Eijmer, a civil engineer with the private railroad company Staatsspoorwegen. The roof was manufactured by Andrew Handyside and Company of Derby, England. Cuypers did design the decorations for the trusses and the gable ends. On 15 October 1889, the station was officially opened, drawing large numbers of crowds. The visitors were charged 0.25 guilders to see the station; in the first two days after the opening, several dozens of thousands paid. The opening of the central station marked the city's transition from a waterfront city to an inland city, spurring further redevelopment activities in the city centre which included the realignment of streets and the filling up of canals. The waterways would soon be replaced by tramways and cars as the primary modes of transport in the city.

In 1920, the East Wing of the station (the lower end of the building) was demolished and replaced by "The East", a postal service building designed by Cuypers' son Joseph. A second, narrower and longer but similar roof on the north side of the station was completed in 1922.

=== Early expansions and modernization ===
In the 1950s, a pedestrian tunnel was created between the station and the road in front of it, which terminated inside the station. With the construction of the metro tunnel in the late 1970s, both the pedestrian tunnel and the road in front of the station disappeared. In the early 1980s, the central hall and middle tunnel were considerably widened and modernized. In the 1990s, a new signaling post was built on the western side of the station. In addition, the number of tracks on that side was expanded in order to increase capacity in the direction of Sloterdijk station. In 1996, a third, 'centre roof' designed by Jan Garvelink, architect at Holland Rail Consult, was built between the two existing roofs, whereby all platforms at the station were now covered.

=== Later reform and expansion ===
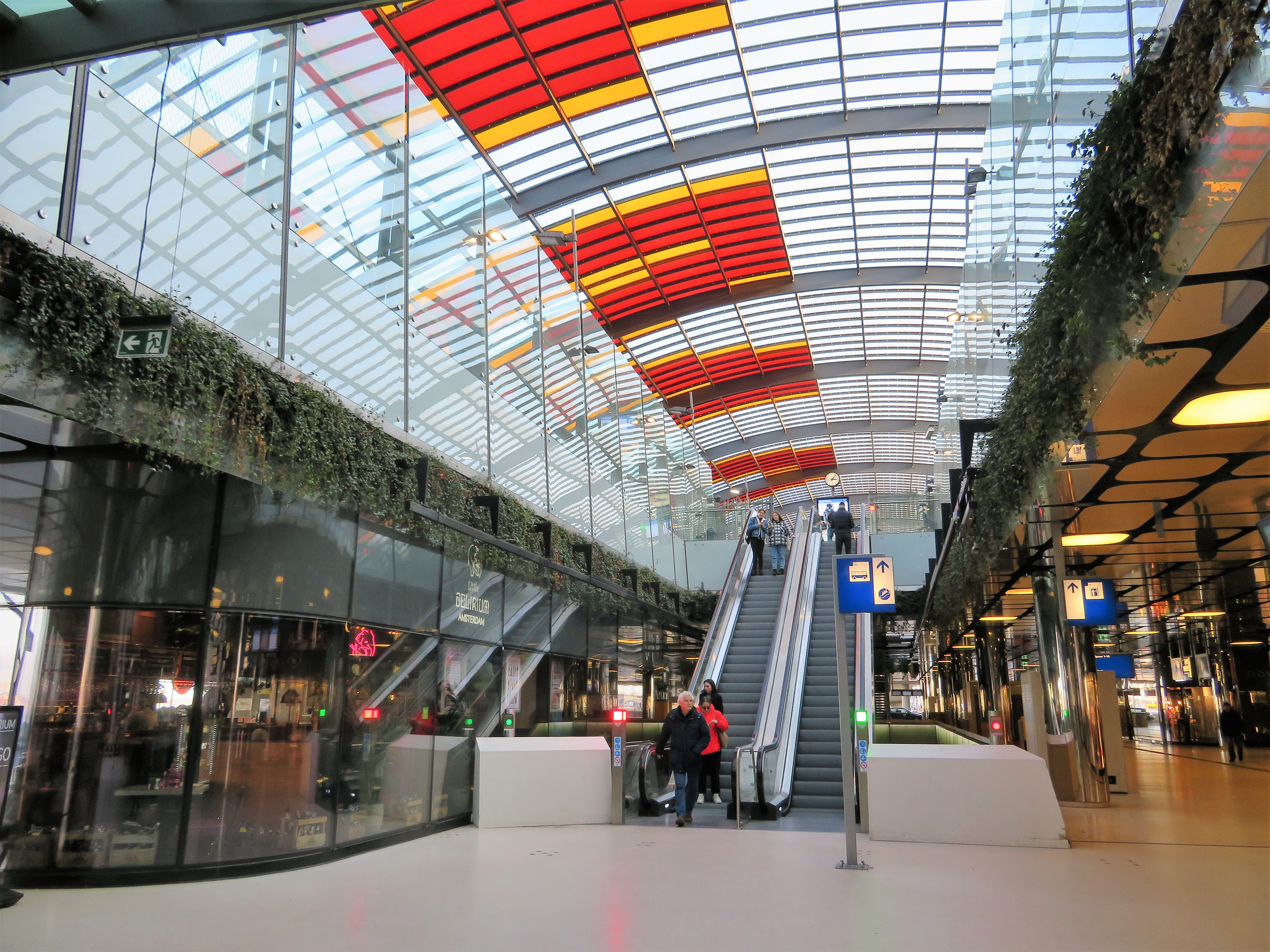
IJzijde station hall

Since 1997, the station has been continuously undergoing reconstruction works because of the development of the North-South Line of the Amsterdam Metro, which was originally planned to be completed in 2014. Due to several setbacks, some at the Amsterdam Centraal building site, the line was fully completed in 2018. Construction works at the station include a renovation of the station building, including the reconstruction of original station features which had disappeared over the years, a redevelopment of the Stationsplein (Station Square), and a new bus station on the north side of the station. In 2000, the new western passenger tunnel opened replacing the main tunnel in the centre of the station which was shut down enabling the construction of the new metro line. In 2004, platforms 10-15 were extended to accommodate international high-speed rail services. Construction works for the bus station commenced in 2003, opened in 2009 and finished in 2014. It includes the construction of a fourth station roof and a station hall with space for shops and restaurants. It replaces 5 small bus stations and several isolated bus stops across the Station Island. With all buses eventually moving to the new bus station on the north side, the Station Island should only be accessible to pedestrians, cyclists and trams.

The three passenger tunnels underneath the station were upgraded and provided with convenience stores and kiosks. In addition, two new passageways were created enabling the hosting of larger retail stores, geared towards passengers who have more time to spend at the station.

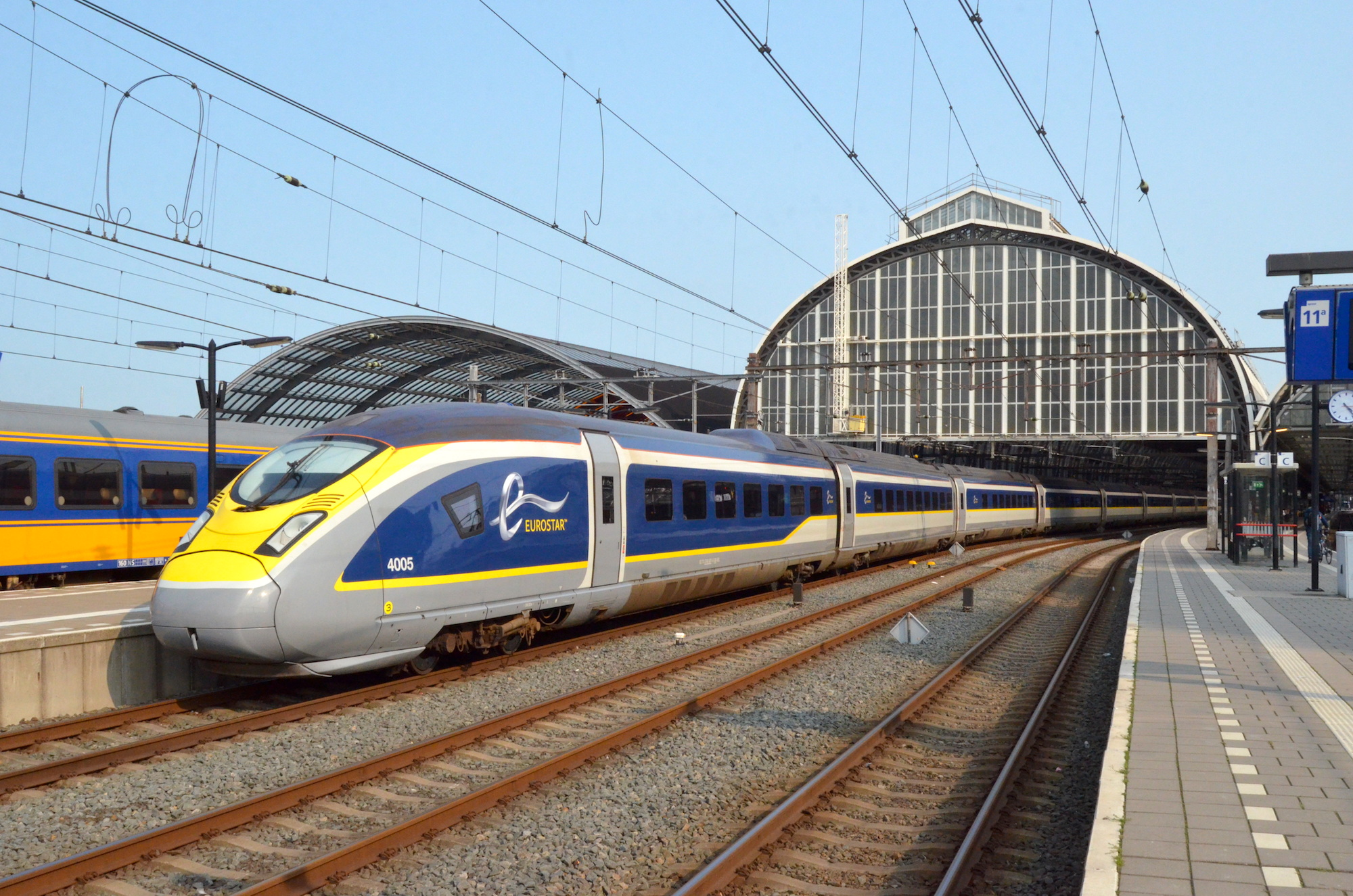
Eurostar calling at Amsterdam Centraal station

On 4 February 2020, the Minister of Infrastructure and Water Management, Cora van Nieuwenhuizen, and the UK Transport Secretary, Grant Shapps, announced that juxtaposed controls would be established in the station. According to the announcement, starting from 30 April 2020, Eurostar passengers travelling to the UK would clear exit checks from the Schengen Area as well as UK entry checks (conducted by the UK Border Force) in the station before boarding their train (without having to disembark at Brussels-South station, go through the juxtaposed controls there, and re-board the train before continuing their journey to the UK). However, the launch was postponed due to the COVID-19 pandemic. The inauguration of juxtaposed controls in the station subsequently took place on 26 October 2020.

From 2017 there will be further reconstruction works at the station. A number of platforms will be widened making use of the tracks which do not currently have platforms. This means that alterations will be made in the tunnels under the platforms again. Furthermore, the eastern tunnel will be made wider, based on the example of the middle tunnel. The old railway bridges to the east of the station will also be replaced.

== Railway station layout ==
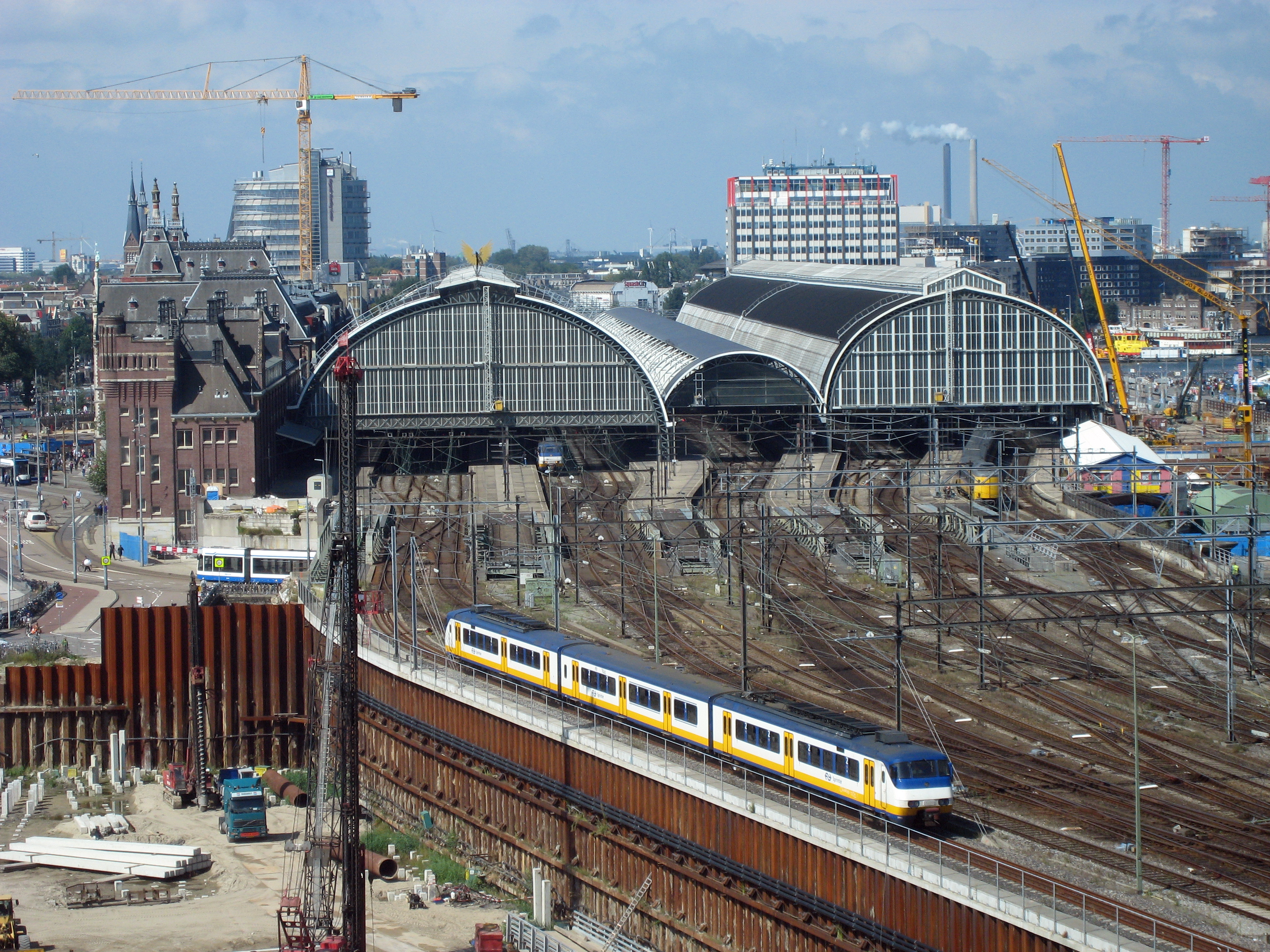
Amsterdam Centraal station from the side

Amsterdam Centraal has 15 tracks, 11 of which are alongside a platform: four island platforms with tracks along the full length on both sides (tracks 4/5, 7/8, 10/11, 13/14); one side platform with one track along the full length (track 15); and one bay platform with two tracks (tracks 1/2). Platforms 2-15 have an A-side (to the west) and a B-side (to the east). This means that there are 21 places where a train can be positioned for passenger access, with scissors crossings in the middle enabling trains to pass each other. Track 1 terminates short of the western end of the station building, which fronts track 2. Tracks 3, 6, 9, and 12 have no platform.

== Railway services ==
Amsterdam Centraal is a terminus station on many historical railway lines in the Netherlands: the Amsterdam–Rotterdam railway (1839), also known as the Oude Lijn, via Haarlem, Leiden and The Hague (Den Haag); the Den Helder–Amsterdam railway (1865), also known as the Staatslijn K, from Den Helder to Amsterdam via Alkmaar and Uitgeest; the Amsterdam-Zutphen railway (1874), also known as the Oosterspoorweg, via Hilversum, Amersfoort and Apeldoorn; the Amsterdam-Elten railway (1856), also known as the Rhijnspoorweg, via Utrecht and Arnhem; and the Amsterdam-Schiphol railway (1986), also known as the Westtak Ringspoorbaan.

As of December 2014, Amsterdam Centraal is served by 8 international rail routes and 22 national rail routes.

From Amsterdam Central Station, one can travel by train to most major destinations in the Netherlands and surrounding countries. In the 2024 timetable, the station will be served by the following train series:

=== International rail ===
| Train | Operator(s) | Route | Notes |
|---|---|---|---|
| 450 | European Sleeper | Brussel-Zuid – Antwerpen-Centraal – Roosendaal – Rotterdam Centraal – Den Haag HS – Schiphol Airport – Amsterdam Centraal – Amersfoort Centraal – Deventer – Bad Bentheim – Berlin Hbf – Dresden Hbf – Praha hl.n. | Stops 2-3x per week. Does not stop at Schiphol Airport and Den Haag HS towards Brussels. |
| Eurostar 9100 | Eurostar | Amsterdam Centraal – Rotterdam Centraal – Brussel-Zuid – Lille-Europe – London St Pancras International | Lille-Europe is served irregularly. |
| Eurostar 9300 | Eurostar | Amsterdam Centraal – Schiphol Airport – Rotterdam Centraal – Antwerpen-Centraal – Brussel-Zuid – Paris-Nord | Various journeys only between Amsterdam and Brussels |
| Eurostar 9900 | Eurostar | Amsterdam Centraal – Schiphol Airport – Rotterdam Centraal – Antwerpen-Centraal – Brussel-Zuid – [ Aéroport Charles-de-Gaulle 2 TGV – Marne-la-Vallée - Chessy ] / [ Chambéry-Challes-les-Eaux – Albertville – Moûtiers - Salins - Brides-les-Bains – Aime-La Plagne – Landry – Bourg-Saint-Maurice ] / [ Valence-Rhône-Alpes-Sud TGV – Avignon TGV – Aix-en-Provence TGV – Marseille Saint-Charles ] | Marne-la-Vallée - Chessy 2 times a day. Bourg-Saint-Maurice 1 time a week in winter. Marseille Saint-Charles 1 time a week in summer. |
| 140/240 ICE 77 | Intercity (NS International / DB Fernverkehr) | Amsterdam Centraal – Hilversum – Amersfoort Centraal – Apeldoorn – Deventer – Hengelo – Bad Bentheim – Rheine – Osnabrück Hbf – Bünde (Westf) – Hannover Hbf – Berlin-Spandau – Berlin Hbf – Berlin Ostbahnhof | Doesn't stop in Almelo. Runs every 2 hours. |
| 9200 IC 35 | Intercity Direct, Beneluxtrein (NS International) | Amsterdam Centraal – Schiphol Airport – Rotterdam Centraal – Breda – Noorderkempen – Antwerpen-Centraal – Mechelen – Brussels Airport-Zaventem – Brussel-Noord – Brussel-Centraal – Brussel-Zuid | Via HSL-Zuid, between Schiphol and Rotterdam, a surcharge is payable for travel within the Netherlands. |
| 100 ICE 43 | Intercity Express (NS International) | Amsterdam Centraal – Utrecht Centraal – Arnhem Centraal – Oberhausen Hbf – Duisburg Hbf – Düsseldorf Hbf ] / [ Hannover Hbf – Minden (Westf) – Herford – Bielefeld Hbf – Gütersloh Hbf – Hamm (Westf) – Hagen Hbf – Wuppertal Hbf ] – Köln Hbf – Siegburg/Bonn – Frankfurt (Main) Flughafen Fernbahnhof – Mannheim Hbf – Karlsruhe Hbf – Offenburg – Freiburg (Breisgau) Hbf – Basel Bad Bf – Basel SBB | Once a day between Amsterdam and Basel. |
| 400 | ÖBB (Nightjet) | Amsterdam Centraal – Utrecht Centraal – Arnhem Centraal – Innsbruck Hbf / Vienna / Zürich HB | |

In March 2026 GoVolta services began calling.

=== National rail ===
National rail services at the station are provided by NS, the principal rail operator in the Netherlands. NS offers three types of rail service from Amsterdam Centraal: long-distance Intercity services, local Sprinter services, and the Nachtnet night service.

| Train | Operator(s) | Route |
|---|---|---|
| 1400 | Intercity (NS) | Utrecht Centraal – Amsterdam Centraal – Schiphol Airport – Den Haag HS – Rotterdam Centraal |
| 1500 | Intercity (NS) | Amsterdam Centraal – Hilversum – Amersfoort Centraal – Apeldoorn – Deventer |
| 2100 | Intercity (NS) | Amsterdam Centraal – Haarlem – Leiden Centraal – Den Haag Centraal |
| 2200 | Intercity (NS) | Amsterdam Centraal – Amsterdam Sloterdijk – Haarlem – Leiden Centraal – Den Haag HS – Delft – Schiedam Centrum – Rotterdam Centraal – Dordrecht – Roosendaal – Vlissingen |
| 2300 | Intercity (NS) | Amsterdam Centraal – Amsterdam Sloterdijk – Haarlem – Leiden Centraal – Den Haag HS – Delft – Schiedam Centrum – Rotterdam Centraal – Dordrecht – Roosendaal – Vlissingen |
| 2600 | Intercity (NS) | Almere Centrum – Amsterdam Centraal |
| 2700 | Intercity (NS) | Maastricht – Sittard – Roermond – Weert – Eindhoven Centraal – 's-Hertogenbosch – Utrecht Centraal – Amsterdam Centraal – Alkmaar – (Den Helder) |
| 2900 | Intercity (NS) | Enkhuizen – Hoorn – Amsterdam Centraal – Utrecht Centraal – 's-Hertogenbosch – Eindhoven Centraal – Weert – Roermond – Sittard – Maastricht |
| 3000 | Intercity (NS) | Nijmegen – Arnhem Centraal – Ede-Wageningen – Veenendaal-De Klomp – Driebergen-Zeist – Utrecht Centraal – Amsterdam Centraal – Zaandam – Alkmaar – Den Helder |
| 3700 | Sprinter (NS) | Amsterdam Centraal – Hoorn – Enkhuizen |
| 3900 | Intercity (NS) | Enkhuizen – Hoorn – Amsterdam Centraal – Utrecht Centraal – 's-Hertogenbosch – Eindhoven Centraal – Weert – Roermond – Sittard – Heerlen |
| 4000 | Sprinter (NS) | Uitgeest – Zaandam – Amsterdam Centraal – Breukelen – Woerden – Gouda – Rotterdam Centraal |
| 4600 | Sprinter (NS) | Amsterdam Centraal – Weesp – Almere Centrum – Almere Buiten – Almere Oostvaarders |
| 4800 | Sprinter (NS) | Amsterdam Centraal – Haarlem – Alkmaar – Hoorn |
| 5400 | Sprinter (NS) | Amsterdam Centraal – Haarlem – Zandvoort aan Zee |
| 5800 | Sprinter (NS) | Amersfoort Vathorst – Amersfoort Centraal – Hilversum – Weesp – Amsterdam Centraal |
| 7400 | Sprinter (NS) | Uitgeest – Zaandam – Amsterdam Centraal – Breukelen – Utrecht Centraal – Driebergen-Zeist |
| 8100 | Sprinter (NS) | Amsterdam Centraal – Amsterdam Sloterdijk – Schiphol Airport – Hoofddorp |
| 8200 | Sprinter (NS) | Amsterdam Centraal – Amsterdam Sloterdijk – Schiphol Airport – Hoofddorp |
| 8300 | Sprinter (NS) | Amsterdam Centraal – Amsterdam Sloterdijk – Schiphol Airport – Hoofddorp |
| 8400 | Sprinter (NS) | Amsterdam Centraal – Amsterdam Sloterdijk – Schiphol Airport – Hoofddorp |
| 12100 | Intercity (NS) | Amsterdam Centraal – Amsterdam Sloterdijk – Haarlem – Zandvoort aan Zee |
| 22200 | Intercity (NS) | Amsterdam Centraal – Haarlem |
| 32790 | Nachttrein (Arriva) | Groningen – Assen – Zwolle – Lelystad Centrum – Almere Centrum – Amsterdam Centraal – Schiphol Airport |

== Other transport ==
=== Metro services ===
Centraal Station
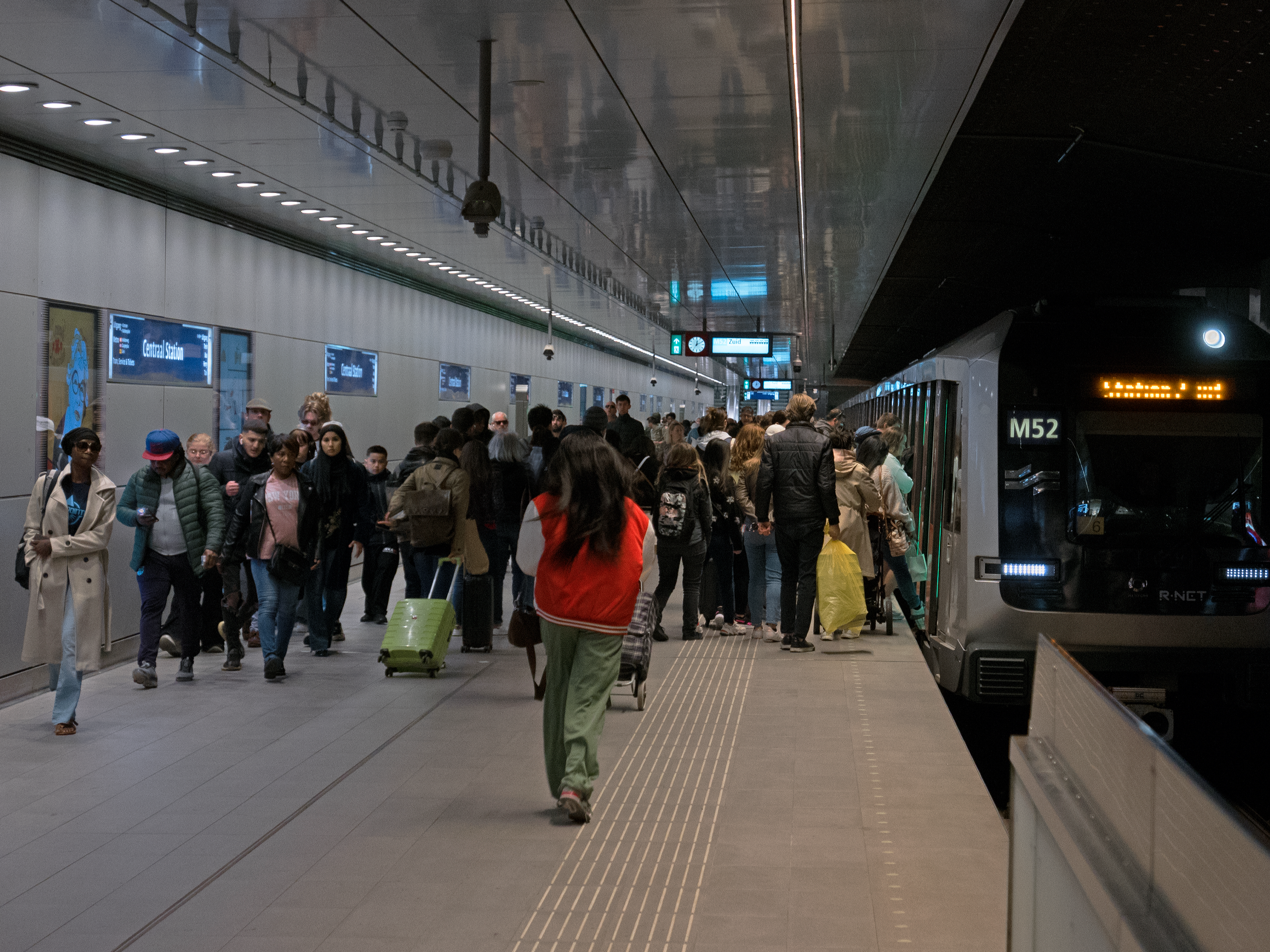
- Amsterdam Centraal metro station platform for Line 52

General information
- Location: Stationsplein 15, Amsterdam; Netherlands
- Owner: City of Amsterdam
- Operator: Amsterdam Metro
- Lines: 51 Line 51; 52 Line 52; 53 Line 53; 54 Line 54
- Platforms: 2
- Tracks: 2
- Train operators: GVB

Construction
- Structure type: Underground

History
- Opened: 22 July 2018
Services
| Preceding station | Amsterdam Metro | Following station |
|---|---|---|
| Terminus | Line 51 | Nieuwmarkt towards Isolatorweg |
| Terminus | Line 53 | Nieuwmarkt towards Gaasperplas |
| Terminus | Line 54 | Nieuwmarkt towards Gein |
| Noorderpark towards Noord | Line 52 | Rokin towards Station Zuid |
Location
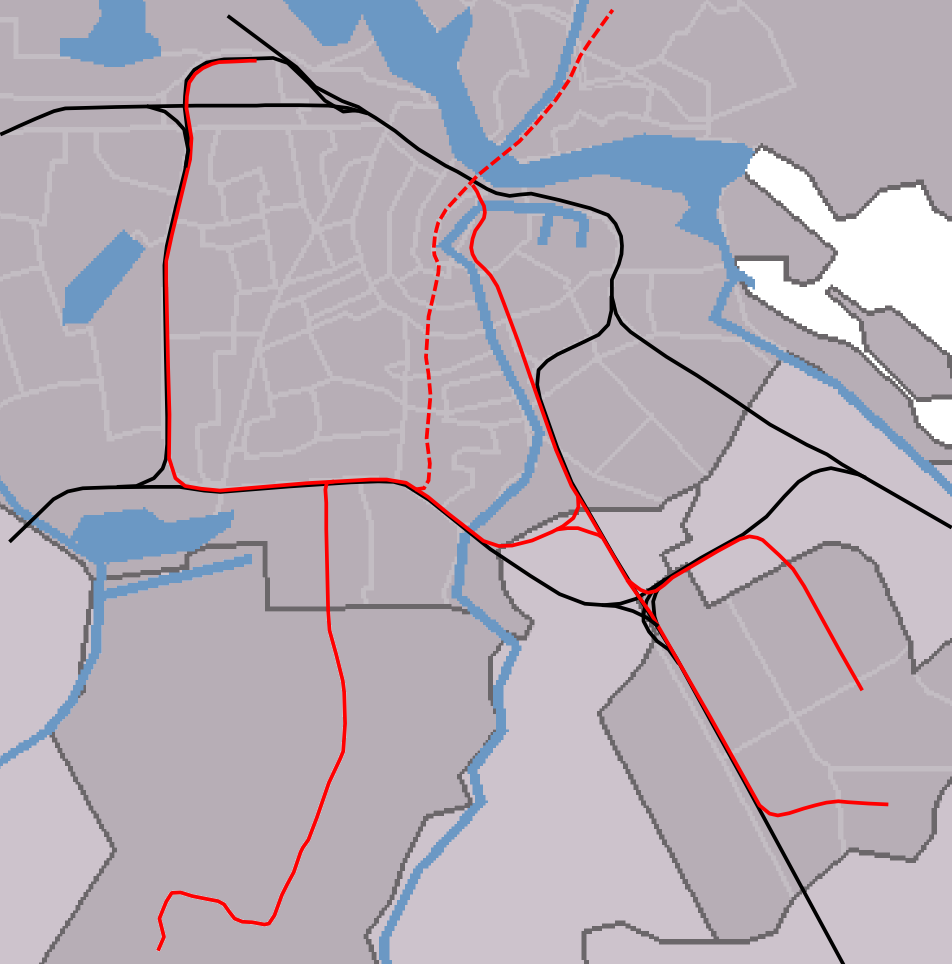
- Location within metro van Amsterdam

Amsterdam Centraal metro station (called Centraal Station on the Amsterdam Metro system) opened in 1980. It is the terminus station of three routes: Line 51 (Amsterdam Centraal - Isolatorweg), Line 53 (Amsterdam Centraal - Gaasperplas), and Line 54 (Amsterdam Centraal - Gein). In July 2018, Line 52 (Noord Station - Zuid Station) opened.

The metro station is accessible with an OV-chipkaart smart card and the OVpay system which allows contactless payment cards and Apple / Google Pay to be used. Disposable cards for one-hour, one-day or multiple-day use are available at ticket machines in the metro station hall.

As of 2018, the following metro services call at Centraal Station:

| Route | Line | From | Via | To | Frequency |
|---|---|---|---|---|---|
| | Line 51 | Centraal Station | Nieuwmarkt, Waterlooplein, Weesperplein, Wibautstraat, Amstelstation, Spaklerweg, Overamstel, Station RAI, Station Zuid, Amstelveenseweg, Henk Sneevlietweg, Heemstedestraat, Station Lelylaan, Postjesweg, Jan van Galenstraat, De Vlugtlaan, Station Sloterdijk | Isolatorweg | 8/hour (peak hours), 6/hour (Mon-Sun until 8.00 pm), 5/hour (from 8.00 pm, Sat-Sun until 10.00 am) |
| | Line 52 | Noord | Noorderpark, Centraal Station, Rokin, Vijzelgracht, De Pijp, Europaplein | Station Zuid | 10/hour (Mon-Sun until 10.00 pm), 8/hour (Sat-Sun until 10.00 pm, Mon-Sun after 10.00 pm) |
| | Line 53 | Centraal Station | Nieuwmarkt, Waterlooplein, Weesperplein, Wibautstraat, Amstelstation, Spaklerweg, Van der Madeweg, Venserpolder, Station Diemen Zuid, Verrijn Stuartweg, Ganzenhoef, Kraaiennest | Gaasperplas | 8/hour (peak hours), 6/hour (Mon-Sun until 10.00 pm), 4/hour (Sat-Sun until 10.00 am, Mon-Sun after 10.00 pm) |
| | Line 54 | Centraal Station | Nieuwmarkt, Waterlooplein, Weesperplein, Wibautstraat, Amstelstation, Spaklerweg, Van der Madeweg, Station Duivendrecht, Strandvliet, Station Bijlmer ArenA, Bullewijk, Station Holendrecht, Reigersbos | Gein | 8/hour (peak hours), 6/hour (Mon-Sun until 8.00 pm), 5/hour (Sat-Sun until 10.00 am, Mon-Sun after 8.00 pm) |

=== Tram services ===
Centraal Station

General information
- Location: Stationsplein, Amsterdam; Netherlands
- Owner: City of Amsterdam
- Operator: Amsterdam Tram
- Lines: Line 2 Line 12; Line 13; Line 14; Line 17; Line 26
- Train operators: GVB
Services at Westzijde
| Preceding station | Amsterdam Tram | Following station |
|---|---|---|
| Terminus | Line 2 | Nieuwezijds Kolk towards Nieuw Sloten |
| Terminus | Line 12 | Nieuwezijds Kolk towards Amstelstation |
| Terminus | Line 13 | Nieuwezijds Kolk towards Geuzenveld |
| Terminus | Line 17 | Nieuwezijds Kolk towards Osdorp Dijkgraafplein |
Services at Oostzijde
| Preceding station | Amsterdam Tram | Following station |
|---|---|---|
| Terminus | Line 4 | Dam towards Drentepark |
| Terminus | Line 14 | Dam towards Flevopark |
| Terminus | Line 26 | Muziekgebouw / Bimhuis towards IJburg |
Location

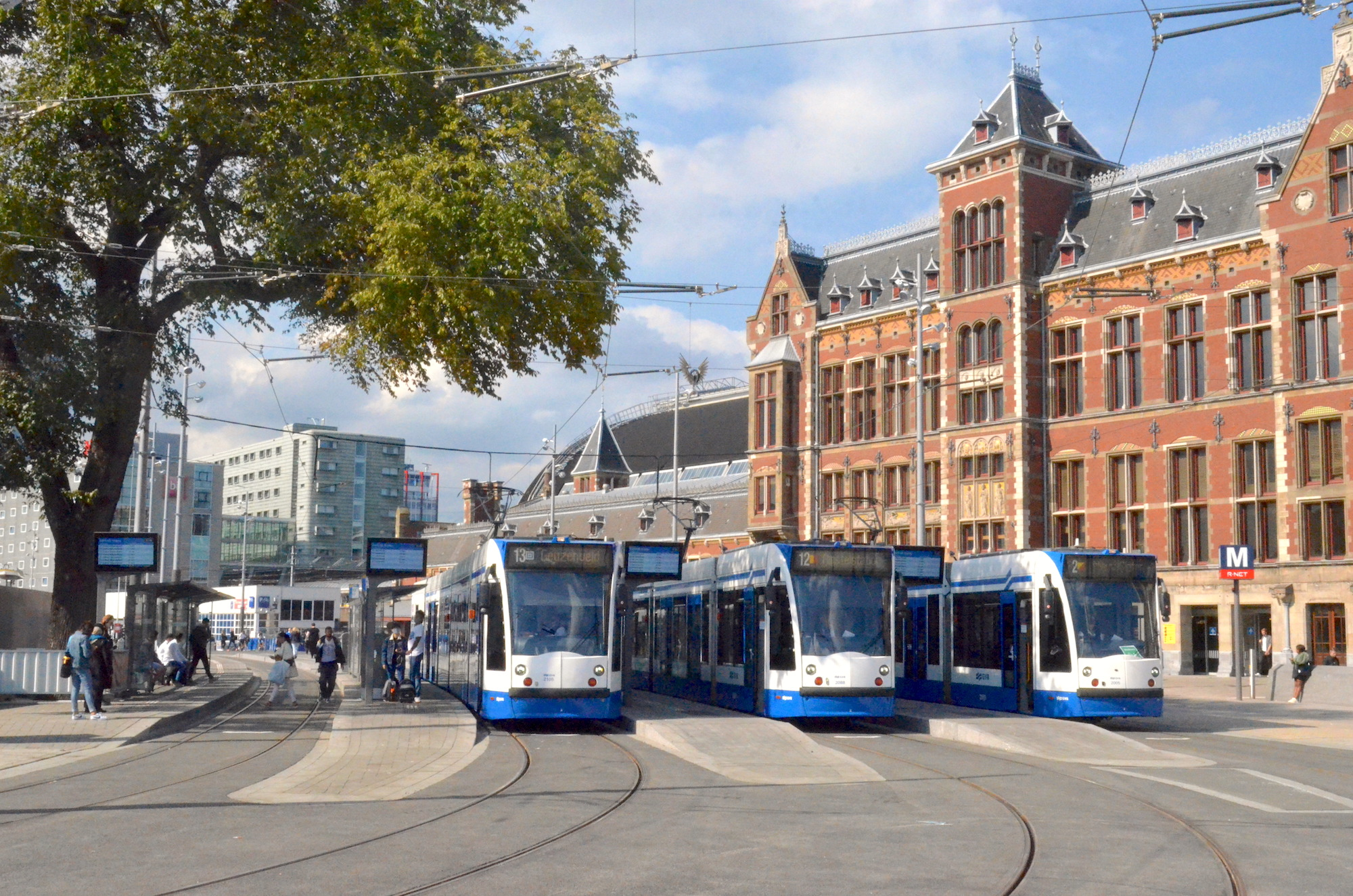
Tram stop for routes 2, 12, 13 and 17 on the west side (Westzijde)

Tram services at Amsterdam Centraal are provided from two tram stations on Stationsplein (Station Square), situated in front of the station's main entrance. Tram routes 2, 12, 13 and 17 call on the west side (Westzijde, Platform B) of the square, the other routes call on the east side (Oostzijde, Platform-A).

| Tram Service | Operator | From | To | Via | Frequency |
|---|---|---|---|---|---|
| 2 | GVB | Centraal Station | Nieuw Sloten | Leidseplein, Museumplein, Willemsparkweg, Hoofddorpplein, Heemstedestraat metro station, Sloten | 8 to 10x per hour (Monday-Friday), 6x per hour (Weekends) |
| 4 | GVB | Centraal Station | Station RAI | Rembrandtplein, De Pijp, Rivierenbuurt | 6x per hour. 4x per hour (Evenings/Sundays) |
| 12 | GVB | Centraal Station | Amstel Station | Leidseplein, Museumplein, De Pijp | 6 to 8x per hour. 6 to 9x per hour (Saturday). 6 to 8x per hour (Sundays) |
| 13 | GVB | Centraal Station | Geuzenveld | Westermarkt, Oud West, Overtooseveld Noord, Jan van Galenstraat metro station, Slotermeer | 6 to 8x per hour. 4 to 8x per hour (Sundays) |
| 14 | GVB | Centraal Station | Flevopark | Waterlooplein, Artis, Alexanderplein | 8 to 10x per hour (Monday-Friday), 6 to 8x per hour (Saturday), 4 to 6x per hour (Sundays) |
| 17 | GVB | Centraal Station | Dijkgraafplein (Osdorp) | Westermarkt, Marnixstraat Bus Station, Kinkerstraat, Surinameplein, Lelylaan station, Meer en Vaart, Osdorp Central | 6 to 10x per hour (Monday-Friday), 6x per hour (Weekend) |
| 26 | GVB | Centraal Station | IJburg | Piet Heinkade, Rietlandpark, Zuiderzeeweg (P&R), IJburglaan | 6 to 10x per hour. 6x per hour (Saturdays). 4 to 6x per hour (Sundays) |

=== Bus services ===
==== City services ====
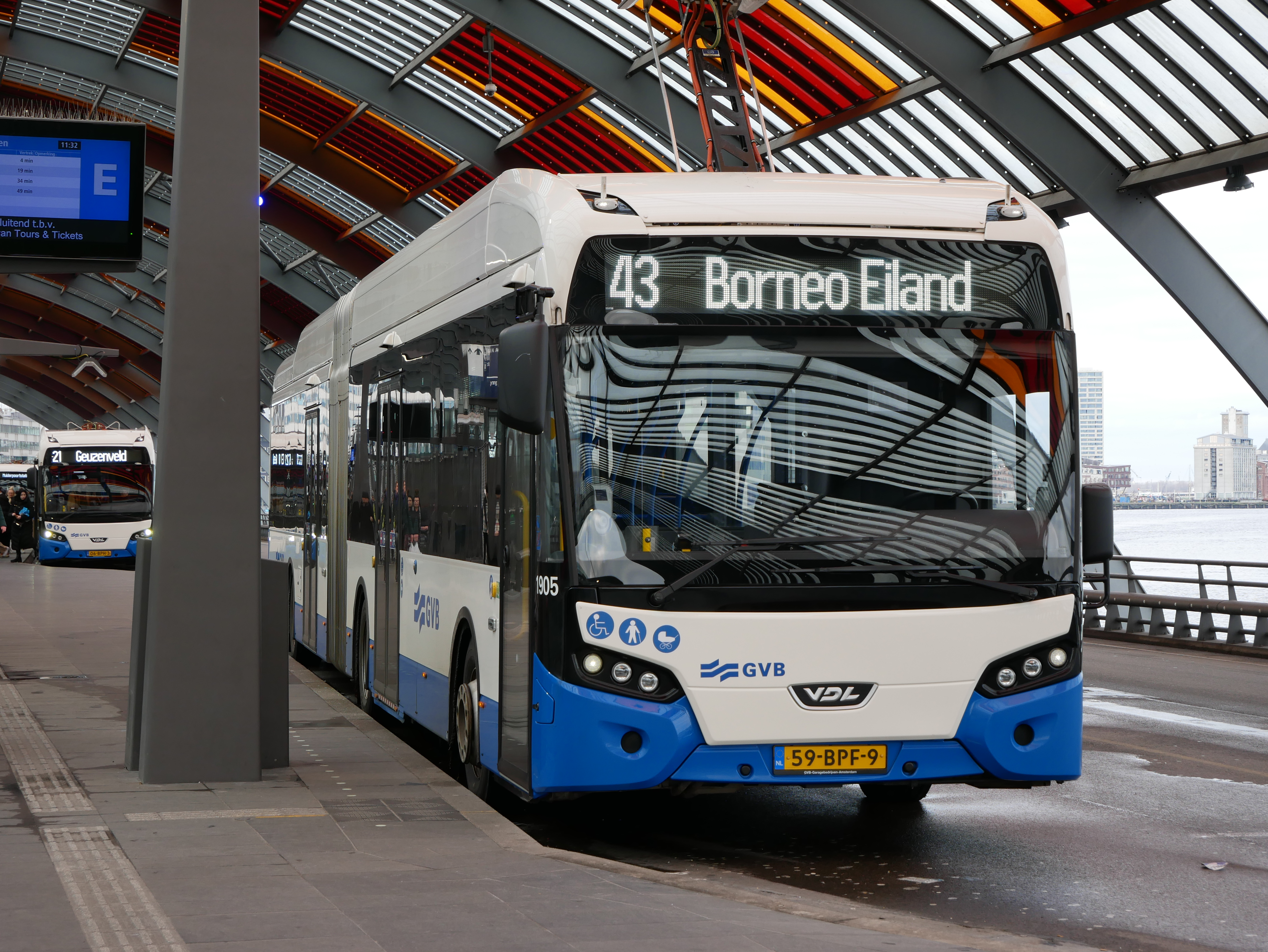
A GVB route 43 bus on platform E

As of July 2018, GVB city bus routes 18, 21 and 22 and 48 depart from the new bus platform G on the lake side of the station (IJzijde or 'IJ side').

| Bus Service | Operator | Platform | From | Via | To |
|---|---|---|---|---|---|
| 18 | GVB | G-K | Centraal Station | Westerdok, De Baarsjes, Mercatorplein, Postjesweg metro station, Johan Huizingalaan | Slotervaart |
| 21 | GVB | G-K | Centraal Station | Westerdok, Van Hallstraat, Haarlemmerweg, Bos en Lommerplein, De Vlugtlaan metro station, Geuzenveld Noord | Geuzenveld |
| 22 | GVB | G-C & G-J | Muiderpoort Station | Spaarndammerbuurt, Centraal Station, Indische Buurt | Station Sloterdijk |
| 43 | GVB | G-E | Centraal Station | Java Eiland, KNSM Eiland | Borneo Eiland |
| 48 | GVB | G-J | Centraal station | Spaarndammerbuurt | Houthaven |

==== City nightbuses ====
Night bus services operate on weekend starting around midnight and running until around 6 AM. From Monday to Thursday, operate only night buses N85 and N87 that run once per hour. On Fridays, Saturdays, and Sundays, they run twice per hour. As of December 2014, all night buses depart from platform G on the lake side of the station and call at all main entertainment areas in Amsterdam's city centre, including Leidseplein and Rembrandtplein.

| Bus Service | Operator | From | To |
|---|---|---|---|
| N01 | EBS | Centraal Station | Purmerend Overwhere |
| N04 | EBS | Centraal Station | Purmerend Purmer-Noord |
| N10 | EBS | Centraal Station | Edam |
| N14 | EBS | Centraal Station | Hoorn |
| N23 | Keolis | Centraal Station | Station Almere Centrum |
| N47 | Connexxion | Centraal Station | Uithoorn, via Amstelveen |
| N57 | Connexxion | Centraal Station | Aalsmeer, via Amstelveen |
| N81 | GVB | Centraal Station | Station Sloterdijk |
| N82 | GVB | Centraal Station | Geuzenveld |
| N83 | GVB | Centraal Station | Osdorp de Aker |
| N84 | GVB | Centraal Station | Amstelveen Busstation |
| N85 | GVB | Centraal Station | Gein |
| N86 | GVB | Centraal Station | Station Bijlmer ArenA |
| N87 | GVB | Centraal Station | Station Bijlmer ArenA |
| N88 | GVB | Centraal Station | Nieuwe Sloten |
| N89 | GVB | Centraal Station | IJburg, via Muiderpoort Station |
| N91 | GVB | Centraal Station | Nieuwendam |
| N92 | Connexxion | Centraal Station | Zaandam Station |
| N93 | GVB | Centraal Station | Molenwijk |
| N94 | Connexxion | Centraal Station | Westzaan |
| N97 | Connexxion | Centraal Station | Nieuw-Vennep, via Schiphol Airport |

==== Noord Holland services ====
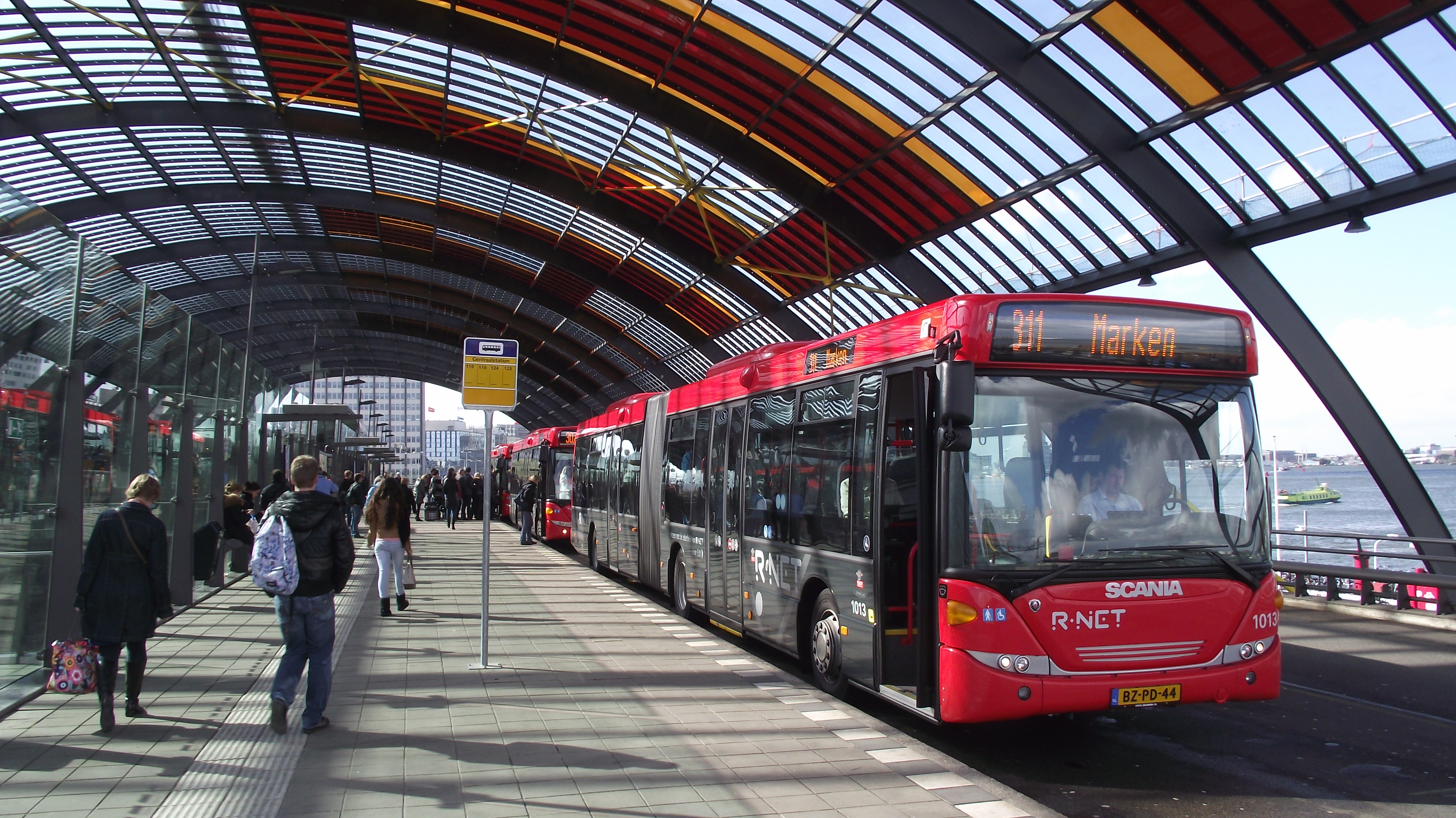
An R-Net EBS bus at the new bus station.

EBS (part of Egged) regional bus services depart from a new bus station on the IJ lake side of the station (beyond platform 15). This can be reached from the main central walkway via escalators. Connexxion bus services depart from the Kamperbrug bus stops on the city centre side of the station.

| Bus Service | Operator | Route |
|---|---|---|
| 305 | EBS R-Net | Amsterdam Centraal – Ilpendam – Purmerend – De Rijp |
| 314 | EBS R-Net | Amsterdam Centraal – Monnickendam – Edam – Station Hoorn |
| 316 | EBS R-Net | Amsterdam Centraal – Monnickendam – Volendam – Edam Busstation |
| 391 | EBS R-Net | Amsterdam Centraal – Zaandam – Zaanse Schans |
| 800 | EBS | Amsterdam Centraal → Zaanse Schans → Edam → Volendam → Amsterdam Centraal |
| 801 | EBS | Amsterdam Centraal → Volendam → Edam → Zaanse Schans → Amsterdam Centraal |

=== Ferry services ===
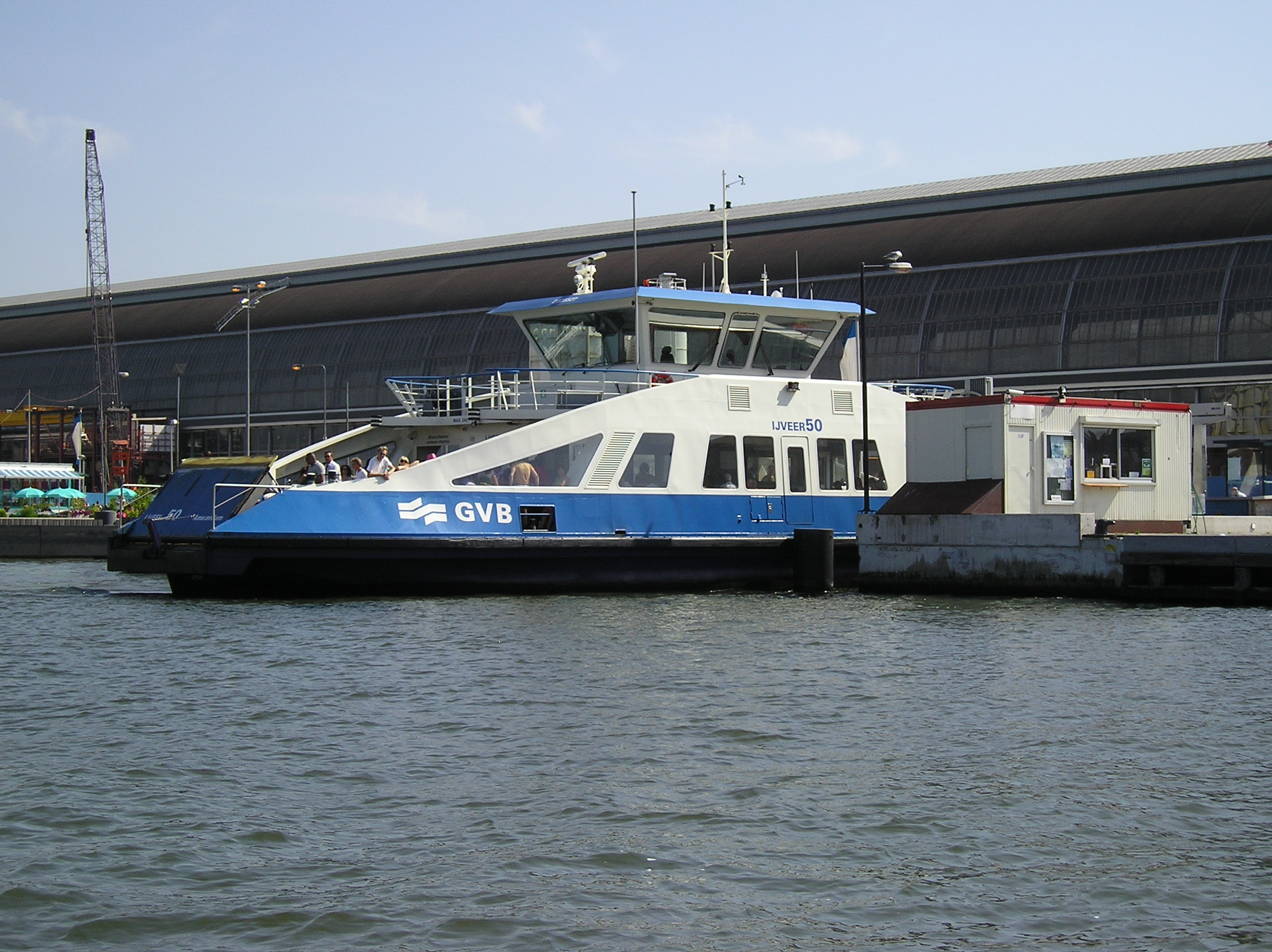
IJ lake ferry at Amsterdam Centraal.

Free-of-charge ferry services from Amsterdam Centraal to the borough of Amsterdam North across the IJ lake depart from the quay on the northern side of the station at the De Ruijterkade. Just behind the station is the EYE Film Institute Netherlands, easily accessible with a free ferry.

| Ferry Service | Operator | From | To | Frequency | Notes |
|---|---|---|---|---|---|
| IJpleinveer (F2) | GVB | Centraal Station | IJplein | 2 to 4x per hour(Monday to Saturday). 2x per hour (Sunday) | On Sunday mornings limited services. |
| Buiksloterwegveer (F3) | GVB | Centraal Station | Buiksloterweg | 24 hours a day, every 6 to 12 minutes (Monday to Sunday) | |
| NDSM-werfveer (F4) | GVB | Centraal Station | NDSM-werf | 2 to 6x per hour (Monday to Friday). 2 to 6 (Weekend). 2x per hour late evenings and night | Late night services Friday (Saturday early morning) and Saturday (Sunday early morning). |

== Underwater bicycle parking ==
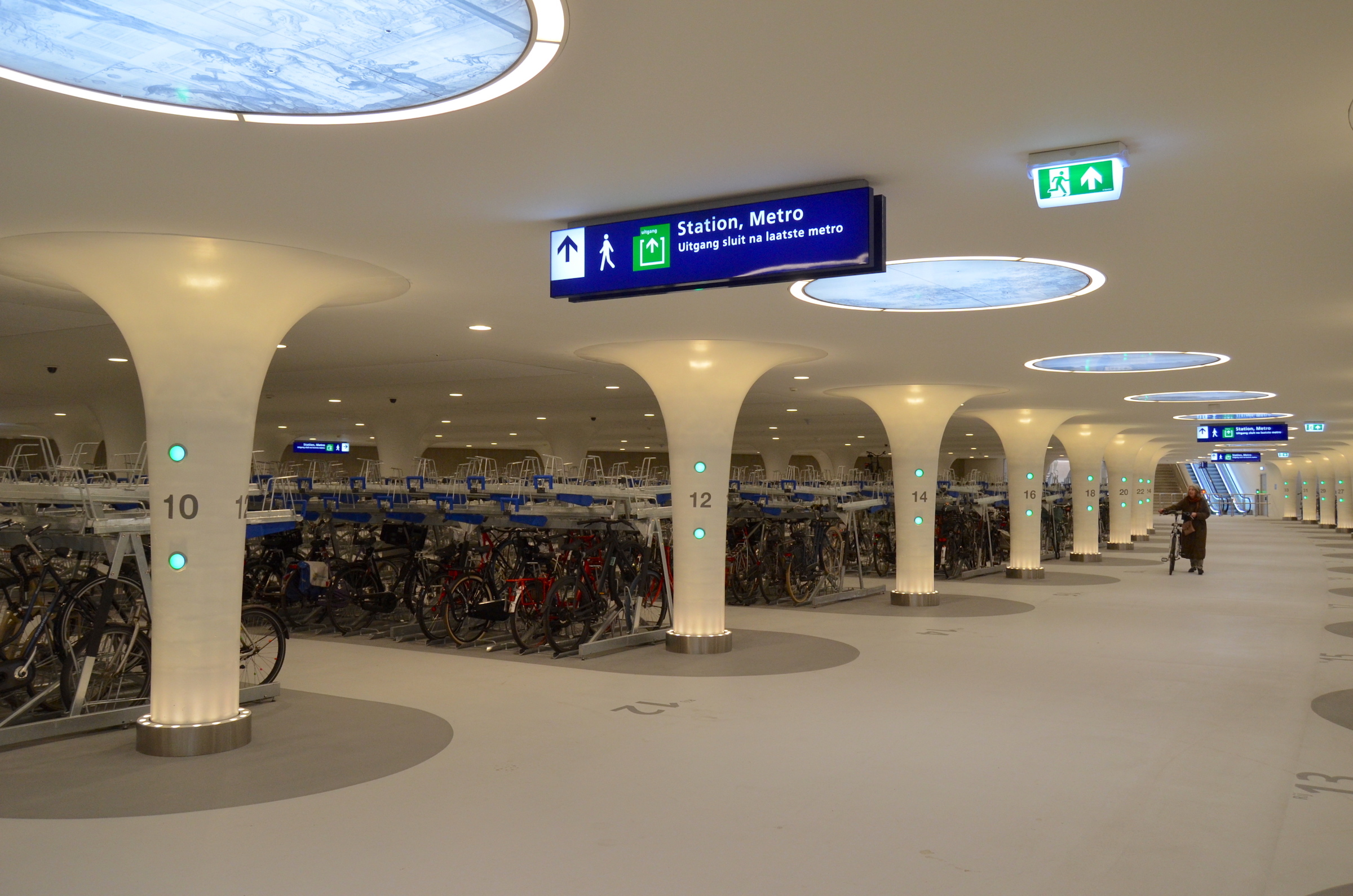
Stationsplein bicycle parking

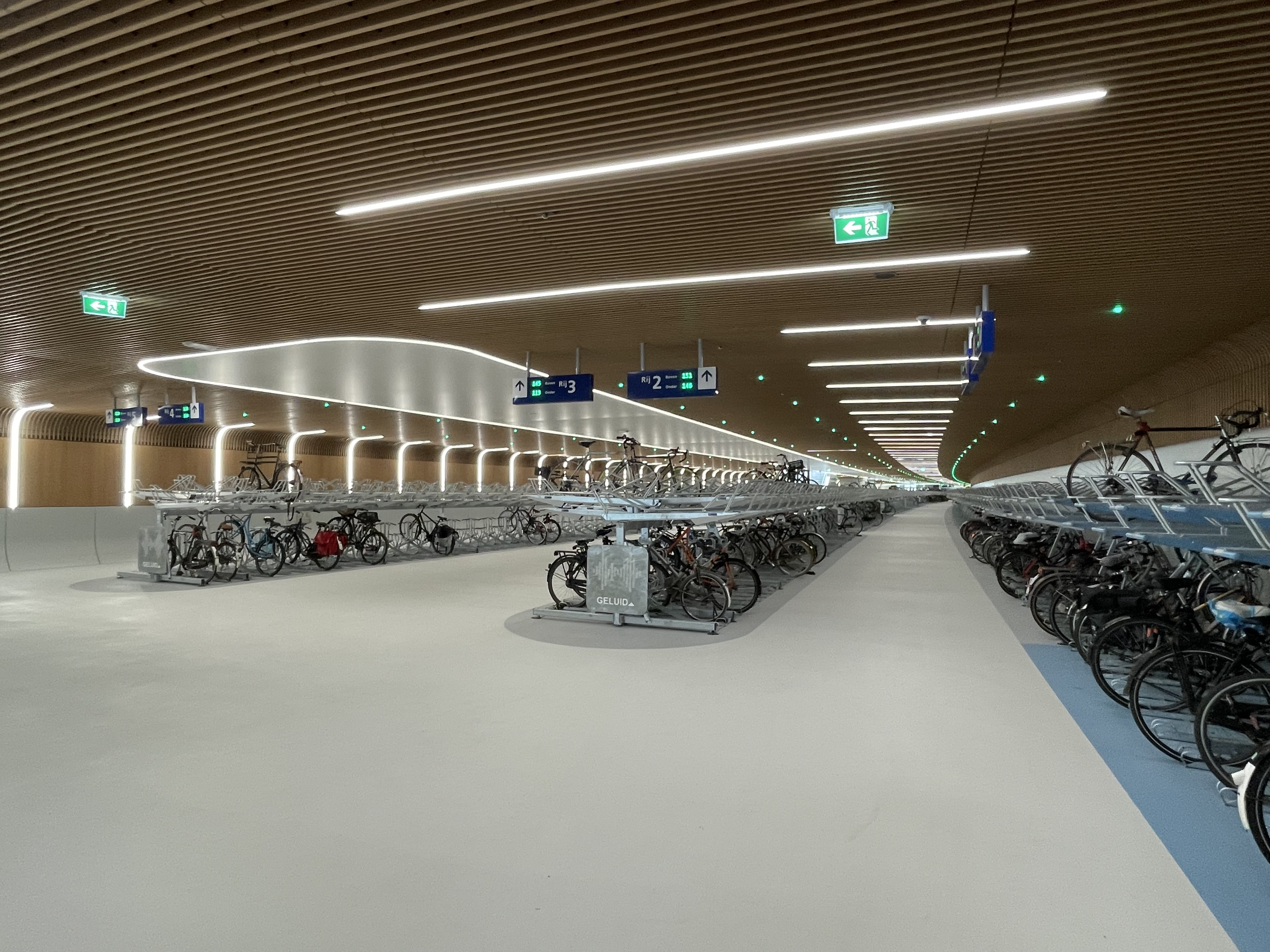
IJboulevard bicycle parking

Due to the completion of the Stationseiland project and the implementation of the Entree plan, the station has had two indoor bicycle parking station and two station bicycle parking stations around the station since 2023. After moving both car traffic and bus traffic from the station square to the rear of the station, the municipality has further reduced the large number of bicycles parked on the street around the station with the construction of these two large station bicycle parkings at the station, whereby cyclists have to park their bicycles in the sheds and no longer on the street.

The Stationsplein Bicycle Parking, the largest bicycle shed in Amsterdam, opened on 26 January 2023 at Central Station. The bicycle shed is located under the water of the Open Havenfront, between Stationsplein and Prins Hendrikkade. The main entrance is at the Martelaarsgracht. Access to and from the station is via the central metro hall. The bicycle parking has space for 7,000 bicycles. There is no space for cargo bikes, fat bikes and scooters.

Construction started in the summer of 2018 and was completed after more than four years. During this period, the water from the Open Havenfront was pumped away and part of the Prins Hendrikkade, with the former Prins Hendrikplantsoen, was excavated. The storage facility was built in the construction pit, after which the water returned. Above the storage facility there are now jetties for tour boats.

On 22 February 2023, the IJboulevard Bicycle Parking was also completed and put into use on the north side of Central Station, which was built in the water of the IJ and will be located under the new IJboulevard along the De Ruijterkade (construction started in March 2021). 4,000 bicycles can be parked here.

== See also ==
- Railway stations in the Netherlands
- List of tourist attractions in Amsterdam
