= De Vlugtlaan metro station =

Metro station in Amsterdam, the Netherlands

De Vlugtlaan
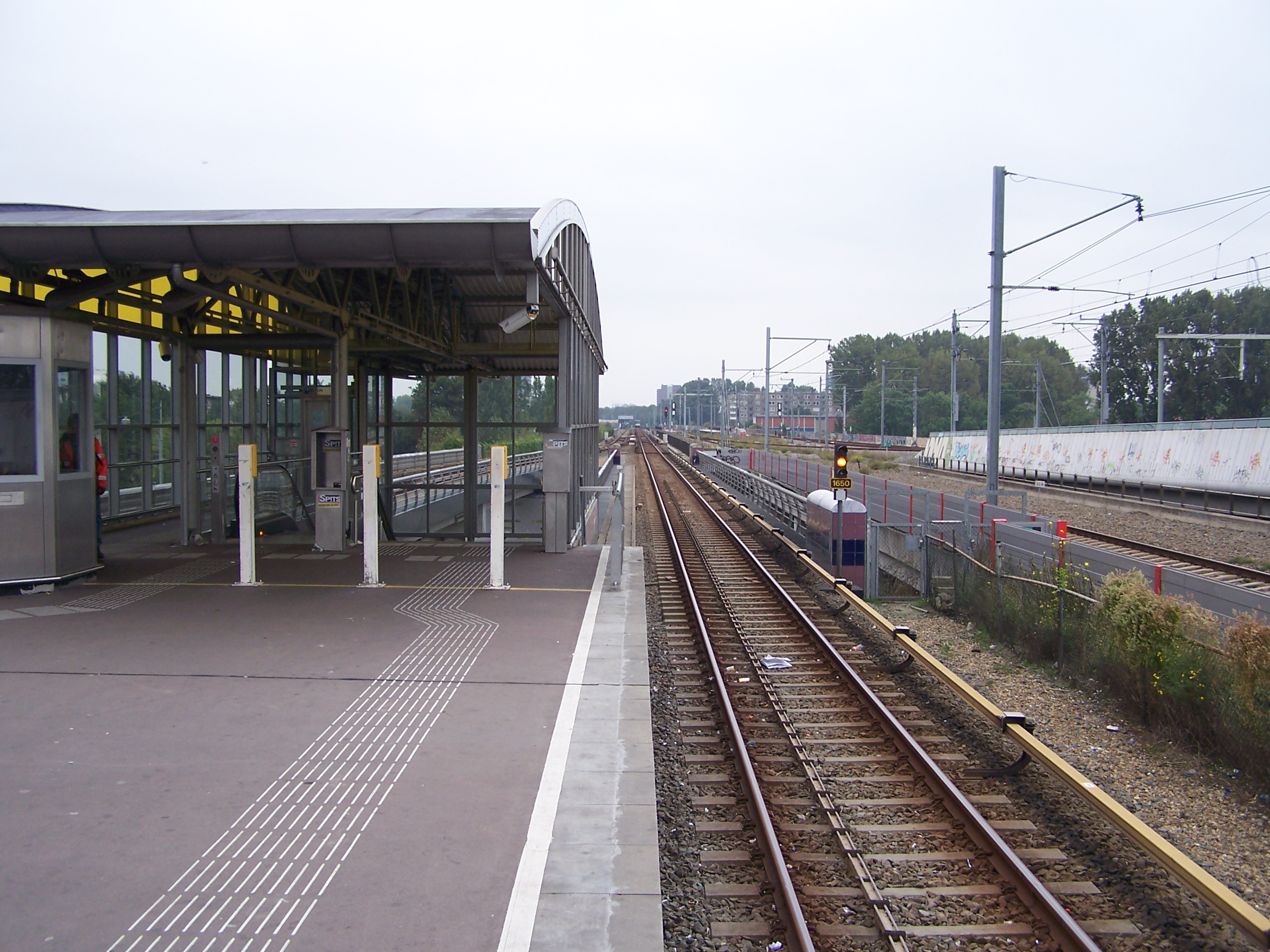

General information
- Location: Amsterdam, Netherlands
- Coordinates: 52°22′46″N 4°50′17″E
- Operator: Gemeente Vervoerbedrijf
- Line: 50, 51
- Platforms: 1 island platform
- Tracks: 2

Other information
- Station code: VLN

History
- Opened: 1 June 1997; 29 years ago

Services
Preceding station	Amsterdam Metro	Following station
Jan van Galenstraat towards Gein	Line 50	Station Sloterdijk towards Isolatorweg
Jan van Galenstraat towards Centraal Station	Line 51	Station Sloterdijk towards Isolatorweg
Location
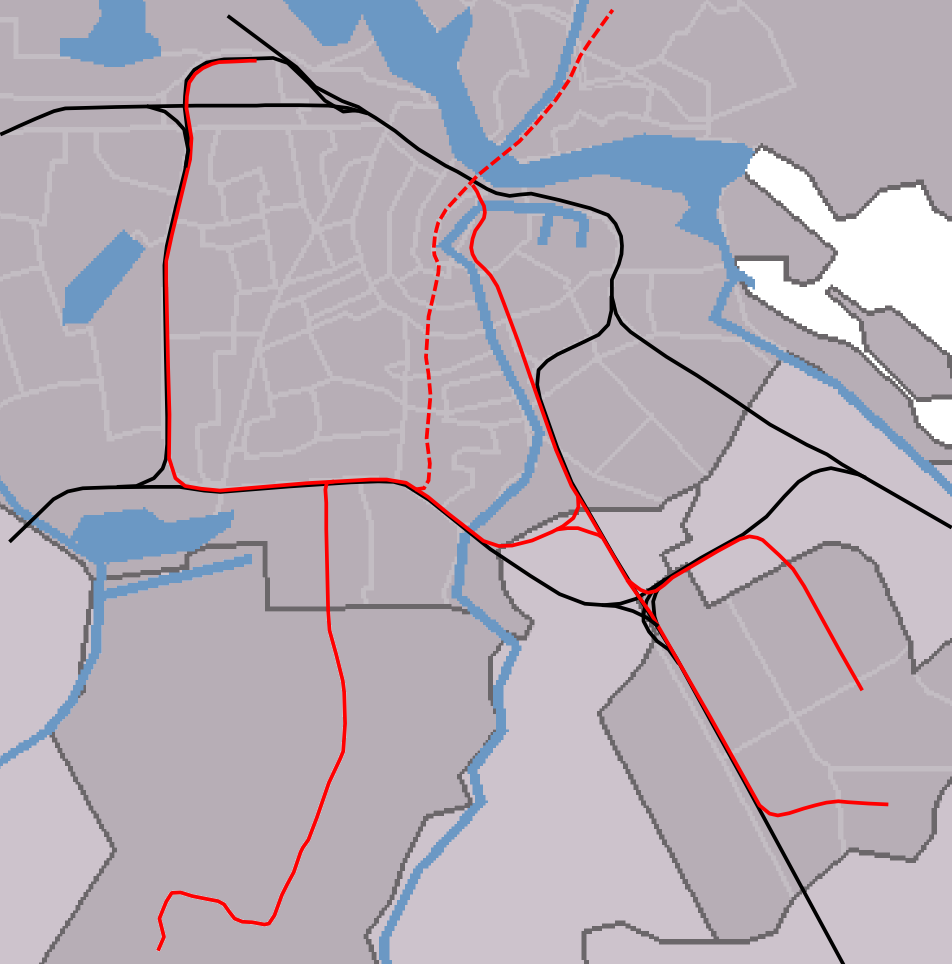
- Location within metro van Amsterdam

De Vlugtlaan is a metro station on Line 50 and Line 51 in Amsterdam, the Netherlands. Between 1986 and 2000, Amsterdam De Vlugtlaan railway station was in use on the railway running parallel next to the metro line.

== Train station ==
The railway station opened on 1 June 1986 together with the western section of the Amsterdam Ring railway. It was situated between Amsterdam Lelylaan and Amsterdam Sloterdijk. The station was originally to be called Burgemeester De Vlugtlaan, named after Willem de Vlugt, Mayor of Amsterdam from 1921 to 1941. However, the "Burgemeester" ("mayor") was eventually dropped. The station was designed by Rob Steenhuis, architect of over ten stations in the Netherlands in the period from 1982 to 1996. The station was served by local trains. The railway station closed in May 2000 to make way for construction of the Hemboog.

== Metro station ==
On 1 June 1997, metro line 50 opened, and next to the train station the current metro station was opened. Parts of the railway station had to be demolished to make room, in particular one of the stairs leading to the railway platforms and half of the station hall. With the closure of the Amstelveenlijn branch for metros, line 51 was rerouted and now also serves De Vlugtlaan.

== Tram services ==
The following services call at De Vlugtlaan:

This service is operated by GVB.

- 7 Slotermeer - Bos en Lommer - De Baarsjes - Kinkerstraat - Elandsgracht - Leidseplein - Weesperplein - Rietlandpark - Azartplein

== Bus services ==
=== City services ===
These services are operated by GVB.

- 21 Geuzenveld - Slotermeer - Bos en Lommer - Staatsliedenbuurt - Haarlemmerplein - Centraal Station

=== Regional services ===
This service is operated by Connexxion

- 80 Amsterdam Busstation Elandsgracht - Amsterdam Bos en Lommer - Halfweg/Zwanenburg - Haarlem - Heemstede - Aerdenhout - Bentveld - Zandvoort Centrum
