= Veolia Transport Nederland =

Transport company in the Netherlands

- Industry: Public transport
- Founded: 1997
- Defunct: 2016
- Headquarters: Breda, Netherlands
- Revenue: €306 million (2013)
- Owner: Transdev
- Number of employees: 3,069 (2013)
- Website: www.veolia-transport.nl

Veolia Transport Nederland was one of the two Transdev operations in the Netherlands operating bus, train and ferry services. It was a subsidiary of Transdev Netherlands. It ceased in December 2016 with the remaining operations rebranded as Connexxion, also another subsidiary of Transdev Netherlands.

== History ==
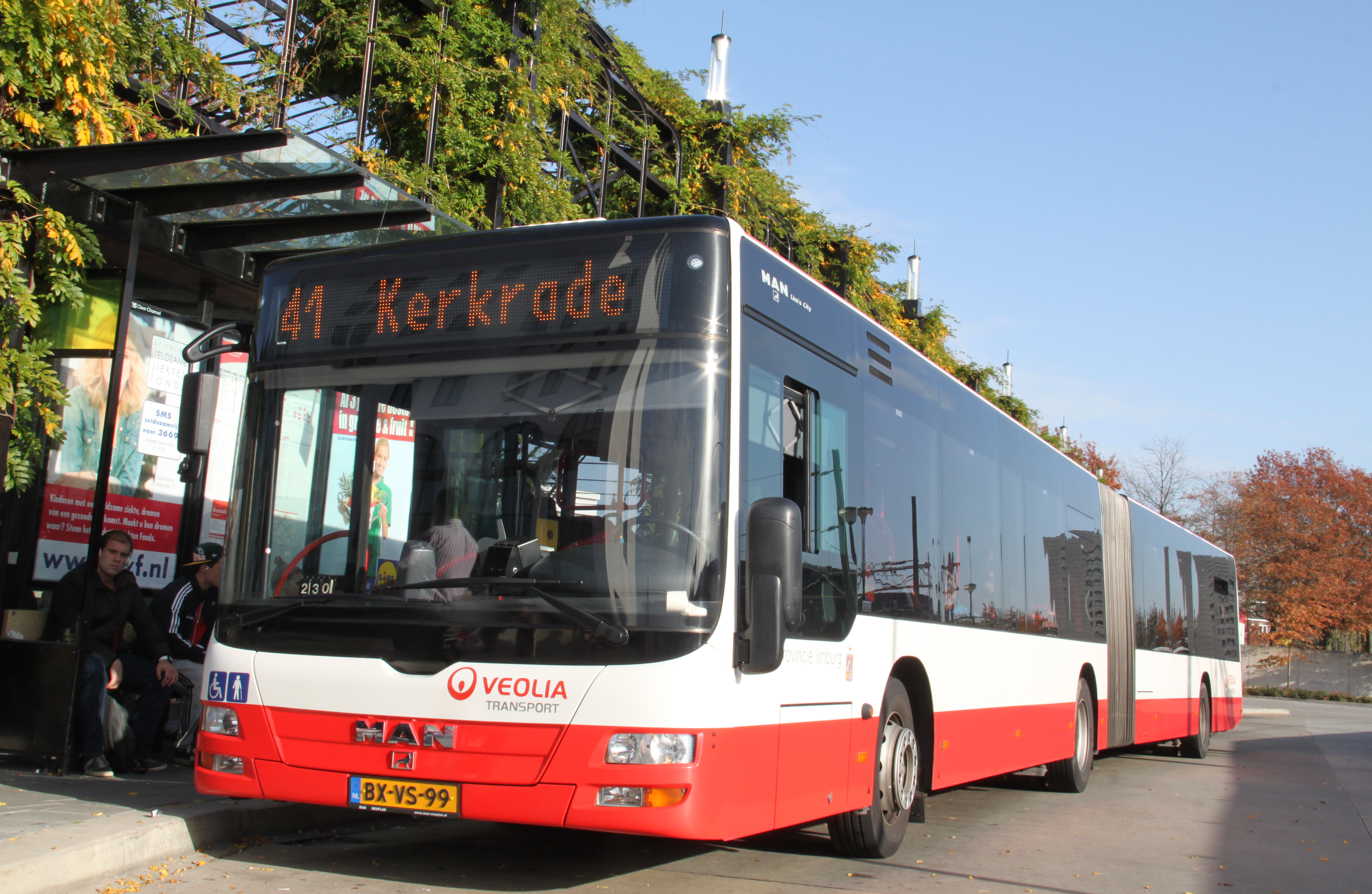
MAN Lion's City at Heerlen station in October 2012

CGEA Transport commenced operating in the Netherlands in 1997 when it purchased a 70% shareholding in train company Lovers Rail that operated the Kennemerstrand Express from Amsterdam to IJmuiden and the Keukenhof Express from Amsterdam to Lisse for the Keukenhof between March and May. In May 1998 it began operating the Spaarne Express from Amsterdam to Haarlem. All of these ceased in 1999.

Veolia Transport Nederland then bought bus companies BBA, Limex and Stadsbus Maastricht. It continued to use the existing brand names for a while. Subsidiary Veolia Cargo Nederland BV operated freight trains on various routes. It was sold in 2009 to SNCF Geodis.

In 2012 it operated city and regional bus transport, the ferry service between the Vlissingen and Breskens and train services in Limburg between Maastricht and Kerkrade, and Roermond and Nijmegen.

After the March 2011 merger of Veolia Transport and Transdev, Veolia Transport Nederland and Connexxion were brought under common ownership after approval was granted by the Netherlands Competition Authority. Both continued to operate independently until June 2015 when both were brought under common management of Transdev Netherlands. When the Limburg concession expired on 11 December 2016, the remaining Haaglanden operations were rebranded as Connexxion.

== Operations ==
Name	Previous operator	Next Operator	Bus services (key places)	Rail services	Ferry services
Gelderland/Veluwe	BBA	Syntus	Apeldoorn (main hub), Harderwijk, Amersfoort, Ede, Wageningen, Zwolle		
Limburg	Hermes, Limex, Stadsbus Maastricht	Arriva	Maastricht, Heerlen, Roermond, Venlo, Kerkrade	Heuvellandlijn (Maastricht - Valkenburg - Heerlen - Kerkrade); Maaslijn (Nijmegen - Venlo - Roermond)	
North Brabant	BBA, Hermes	Arriva	Tilburg, Breda, Bergen op Zoom		
South Holland	Connexxion	Connexxion	The Hague, Delft, Zoetermeer, Wassenaar		
Zeeland	Connexxion	Connexxion	Zeelandic Flanders		Vlissingen - Breskens (Veolia Transport Fast Ferries)
