= Houthem-Sint Gerlach railway station =

Railway station in the Netherlands

Houthem-Sint Gerlach
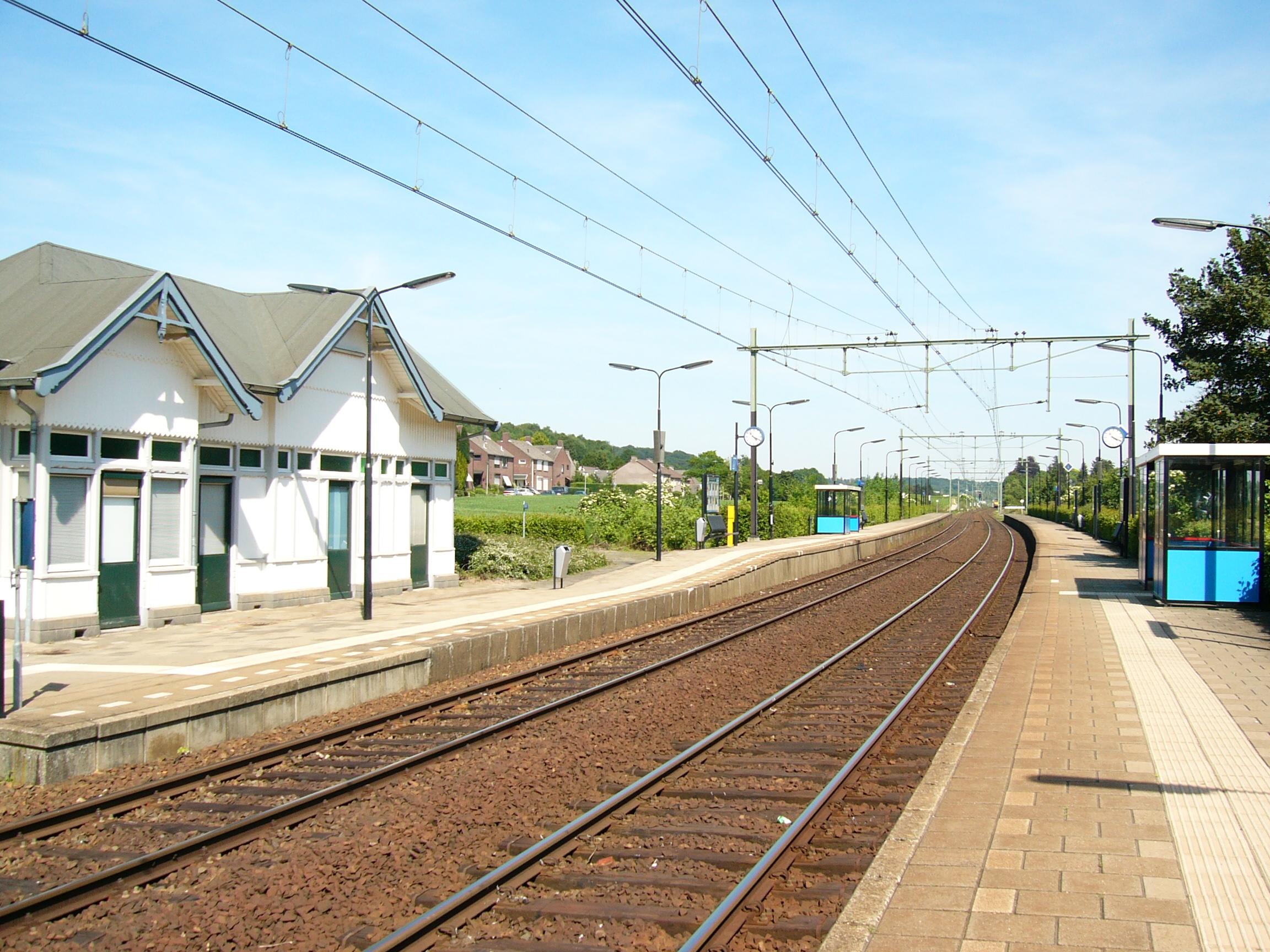

General information
- Location: Caldenborghsweg 4 The Netherlands
- Coordinates: 50°52′24″N 5°47′46″E
- Line: Maastricht–Aachen railway
- Platforms: 2

Other information
- Station code: Sgl

History
- Opened: 1890

Services
Preceding station	Arriva Netherlands	Following station
Meerssen towards Maastricht Randwyck	Stoptrein 32000	Valkenburg towards Heerlen
Location
- Location within Netherlands

Houthem-Sint Gerlach railway station is located in Houthem, the Netherlands. The station opened in 1890 on the Maastricht–Aachen railway.

== Train services ==
Houthem-Sint Gerlach station is served by Arriva with the following train services:

- Local stoptrein S4: Maastricht–Heerlen
