= Trams in Liège =

Tramway de Liège

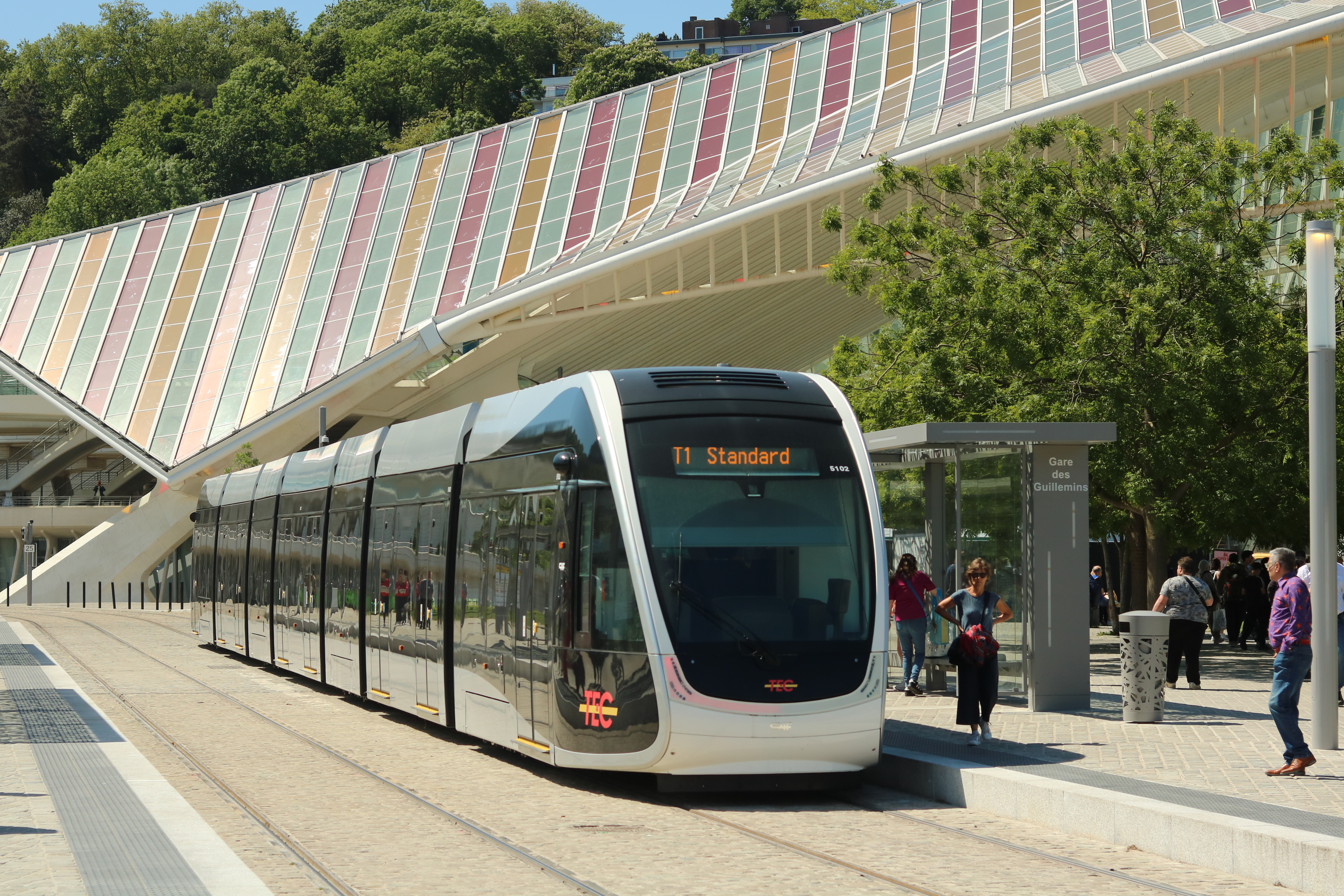
- Tram T1 at Guillemins railway station.

Overview
- Locale: Liège, Belgium
- Termini: Standard, Sclessin; Coronmeuse
- Stations: 23

Service
- Type: Light rail
- Operator: TEC
- Depot: Centre de maintenance et remisage
- Rolling stock: CAF Urbos

History
- Opened: 28 April 2025

Technical
- Line length: 11.7 km (7.3 mi)
- Track gauge: 1,435 mm (4 ft 8 1/2 in) standard gauge
- Operating speed: 19–20 km/h

Trams in Liège, Belgium, date back to horsecars which were replaced by electric trams starting in 1893. Trams in Liège were abandoned by the end of 1967. However, trams made a comeback in the form of the Liège tramway (French: tramway de Liège) at the end of April 2025.

The Liège tramway is a light-rail line connecting the communities of Sclessin and Coronmeuse along the Meuse passing by Liège-Guillemins railway station and Place Saint-Lambert within the city. The line also has a branch to Bressoux where the line's maintenance and storage center is located. The line was put into regular service on 28 April 2025. The line is operated as a public–private partnership, whereby the private partner Tram'Ardent maintains the trams and infrastructure and the publicly owned TEC operates the trams.

== History ==
=== Early years ===
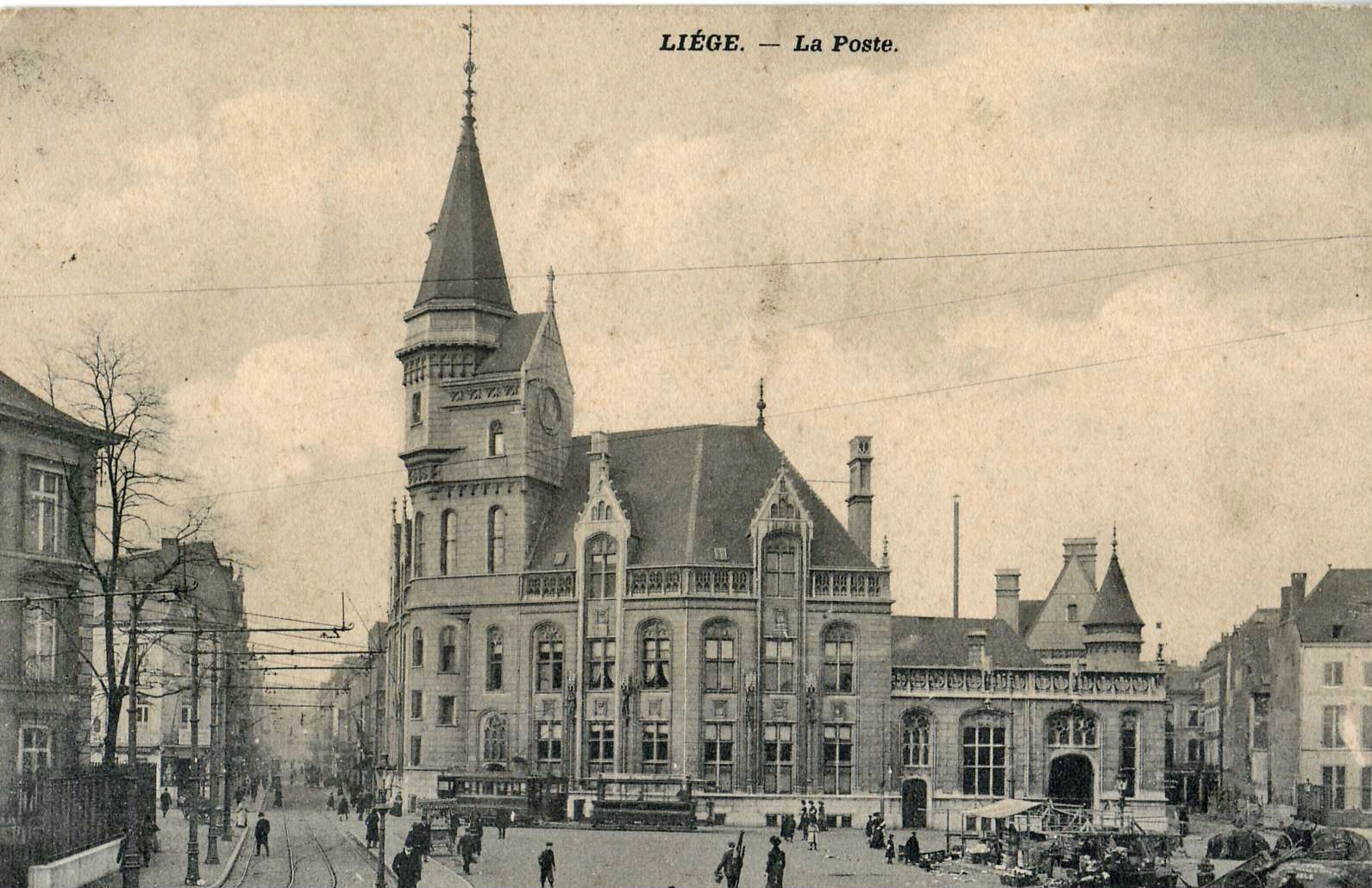
Trams in front of the post office in Liège (1909)

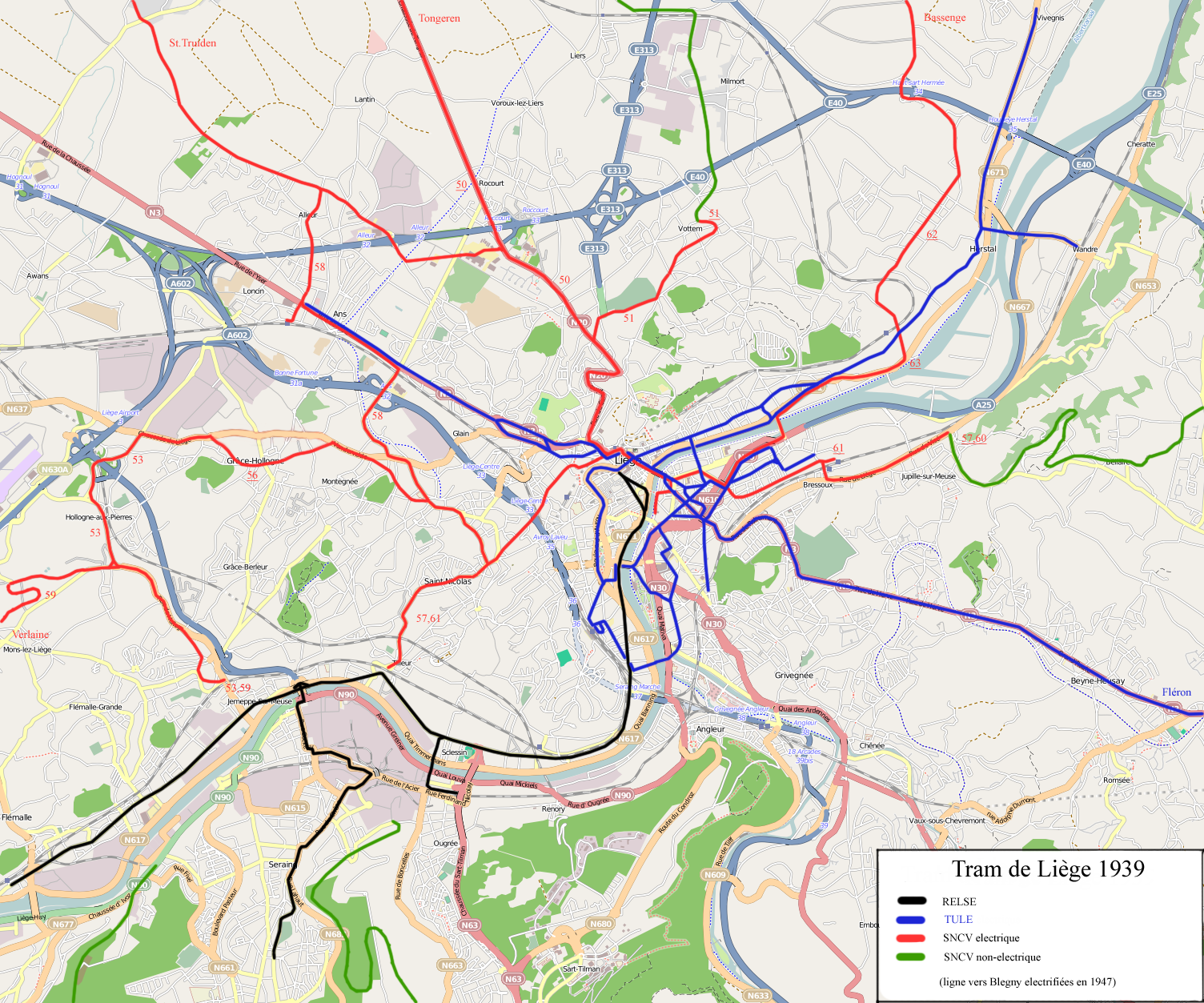
The tram network in 1939

The first electric tram service in Liège, which was also the first in Belgium, opened to the public on 9 August 1893, connecting the northern Coronmeuse district with Herstal, to the east of the city. Only 200 metres (660 ft) of the line actually ran in the city centre. On 22 October 1896, the two principal horse-powered tramlines were converted to electric power, forming an electric tramline that crossed the city centre. In 1897, a line was added connecting Chênée (then considered a separate town) with the city centre, and Angleur received a tram connection in 1905. A fourth line was also installed that year for the World's Fair in Liège.

An aspect of tram operations in Liège was the large number of competing operators. By the start of the 20th century, there had been some consolidation of the businesses involved, but in 1905, there were still six different organisations operating trams in the city, some in public ownership and some privately owned. In addition to the electric trams, the lines were also used by steam trams at this time. It was only in 1927 that the Liège tram network was "unified".

=== Decline and closure ===
The tram collection at the Liège Public Transport Museum contains numerous tramcars that predate the Second World War and some that predate the First World War, which were decommissioned only in the mid 1960s. Evidence is sparse of any trams having been added to the city's fleet after the 1930s, although most of the tramcars were subject to at least one major overhaul or rebuild exercise during their service. In view of the challenging topography (at least by Belgian standards) of Liège, and the visible absence of investment, the last tram services were withdrawn in November 1967.

=== Metro aborted ===
Major investment in a Liège underground Metro system was envisaged and construction eventually began towards the end of the 1970s. A tunnel was started, but the Metro never saw the light of day. The tunnel section that was completed enjoys enduring notoriety as one of Belgium's white elephants. It is used for storage.

=== Return ===
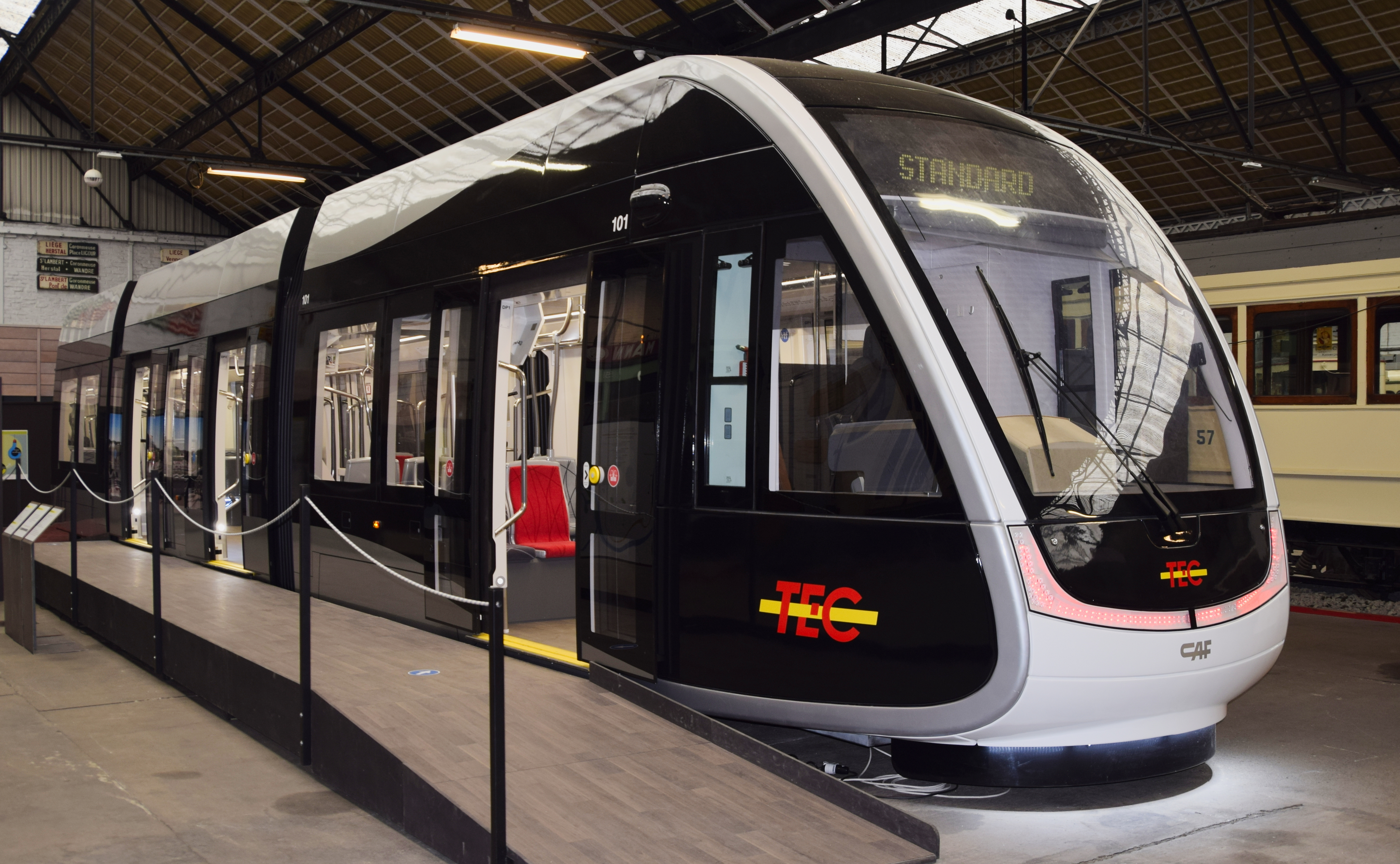
A CAF Urbos mock-up for the new tramway, displayed in the Liège Public Transport Museum

In 2008, regional political leaders generally agreed on reintroducing trams to Liège in order to address the city's traffic saturation issues, particularly in its low lying central parts by the river Meuse. Extensive investigation and public consultation followed, before the first line's route was fixed in October 2011. The regional government of Wallonia gave the final go-ahead at the end of 2011, although at that stage, it was stated that further discussion remained necessary on project funding. In the end, the decision was taken to proceed on the basis of a public–private partnership, inspired by agreements used for recent investments for the London Underground.

==== Revised plan ====
The line was originally planned to be 19.1 km (11.9 mi) long, comprising a 17.8 km (11.1 mi) length from Seraing to Herstal and a further 1.3 km (0.81 mi) for a short branch connection to Bressoux. The plan was revised to build the line in stages initially only from Sclessin to Coronmeuse, serving 21 tram stops, covering approximately 11 km (6.8 mi). The projected cost of €315 million compares with an estimated cost of €484 million for building the entire line at once. The decision not to proceed at once with the full line drew criticism.

==== Third Eurostat rejection ====
By August 2013, tenders for the construction had been received from three consortia. That was narrowed down to two on 3 April 2014, when the remaining contenders were invited to submit their final bids for 15 September 2014. The final decision was announced on 10 December 2014, in favour of the Mobiliège consortium of Alstom, BAM and DG Infra.

The signing of the design, build, finance, operate and maintain contract was planned for the spring of 2015. After a preparatory studies phase, construction was to start in the autumn. However, in March 2015, Eurostat, the European body for the control of accounting standards, reviewed the financing dossier for the Liège tram, and in July 2015, for the second time and following changes to the file, issued a negative opinion.

On 16 January 2016, the City of Liège announced that it has received a negative opinion from Eurostat for the third time, and launched a citizen petition in favour of the tram.

==== Second public contract and award to Tram'Ardent ====
A new call for tenders was published in March 2016, and by 5 October 2017, two bids had been received, from Alstom in France and CAF in Spain. On 10 February 2017, Eurostat approved the financial package. The final choice of the manufacturer should have been made in the first quarter of 2018. However, the transfer of the TEC group to a Walloon Transport Operator (OTW) entailed a further postponement. On 19 September 2018, Opérateur de transport de Wallonie (OTW – new name of the SRWT) awarded the contract to the Tram'Ardent consortium comprising CAF, which will supply the Urbos vehicles, Colas, which will build the infrastructure, and DIF, which will provide financing. As part of a Public-Private Partnership, Tram'Ardent will finance, design and build the tramway, and maintain its trams and infrastructure for 31 years. TEC, a brand name for the OTW, will operate the trams.

By 2019, construction of the line was underway, but would experience various setbacks and delays. In 2023, the region of Wallonia would pay Tram'Ardent €79 million to compensate it for expenses related to COVID-19, which delayed the project by 2 years and 3 months.

On 9 October 2023, the first run of a tram outside the depot took place. The tram made a test run from Bressoux to Coronmeuse, the line's northern terminus. The test run was mostly carried out a low speed, but at one point during the trip, the tram accelerated to 50 km/h in order to test its brakes. This was a first step in testing all 20 delivered trams.

After construction delays, system testing of the new line began on 31 October 2024. In November 2024, a new opening date of 15 April 2025 was announced, which would be about two and a half years later than originally planned. The expected cost of the 12-kilometre line was expected to exceed one billion euros. In March 2025, TEC announced that the line opening would be delayed until 28 April 2025 in order to correct some technical problems discovered during dry runs of the system.

== Modern tramway ==
=== Description ===
Map of tramway in Liège

The Liège tramway consists of a single line running roughly north–south along the west side of the Meuse River between the communities of Sclessin and Coronmeuse. There is also a 1.3-kilometre-long (0.81 mi) branch crossing the Atlas Bridge to the east side of the Meuse to access the tram depot in Bressoux. The line is 11.7 kilometres (7.3 mi) and has 23 stops of which 21 are on the west side of the Meuse and two along the east-side branch. Nine of the 23 stops are at transfer hubs (French: pôle d'échange) providing bus connections and, in three cases, SNCB railway connections (Liège-Guillemins, Saint-Lambert railway station at Place Saint-Lambert stop, Bressoux railway station at Liège Expo stop). Stops are spaced approximately 450 metres (1,480 ft) apart. Two stops, Standard in Sclessin and Liège Expo in Bressoux, have park and ride facilities for 1436 vehicles.

Between Place Saint-Lambert and Place des Déportés (near Pont Maghin), tracks branch into two single-track routes, a bidirectional route via Féronstrée, and a unidirectional route (towards Coronmeuse) via La Batte. From Monday to Saturday, trams to Standard run via Féronstrée and trams to Coronmeuse via La Batte. However, on Sundays to accommodate the Marché de la Batte, trams to Coronmeuse also run via Féronstrée, a pedestrian street with trams.

The frequency of the line is every 5 minutes during rush hours and every 7-15 minutes in the off-hours. Trams operate from 05:00 to 01:00. The average speed of the trams is expected to be 19–20 km/h (12–12 miles per hour) as compared to 10–13 km/h (6.2–8.1 miles per hour) for buses in the downtown area.

There are three bridges that carry the tramway: Atlas Bridge (Pont Atlas), Pont des Modeleurs and Pont des Tilleurs. The tramway crosses 79 signalized intersections. Three sections of the line do not have an overhead wire: between the Général Leman and Blonden stops, between the Opéra stop and Place des Déportés and on the Atlas Bridge.

The line uses 20 seven-section CAF Urbos trams, equipped with onboard batteries to operate on the three sections of the line that have no overhead wire. The trams are 45.4 metres (149 ft) long, 2.65-metre (8 ft 8 in) wide and 3.60-metre (11.8 ft) high, and weigh about 64 tonnes. There are eight double doors on each side of the tram. Each tram has a capacity for about 310 passengers including 62 seated. There are also three spaces for wheelchairs or baby carriages, and two spaces for visually impaired people with room under the seat for a guide dog.

The Maintenance and Storage Centre (Centre de maintenance et remisage, CDMR) is located just beyond the Liège Expo stop. Having an area of 23,100 square metres (249,000 sq ft), the facility has 5 major structures. The service station building, with an area of 590 square metres (6,400 sq ft) and one interior track, contains a sand loading station, a pit and overhead catwalk for inspections and a car wash. The maintenance workshop building has an area of 4,400 square metres (47,000 sq ft) and four interior tracks to accommodate four trams simultaneously: two tracks perched on stilts over a pit, one track for grinding worn wheels and one track for testing bogies. The tram storage shed has five tracks to store up to 25 trams but could be expanded for 40 trams. The operations building has office space for TEC staff and a central command post for both tram and bus operations. An adjacent park-and-ride garage has space for 771 vehicles.

=== Cancelled extensions ===
In early 2024, the government of Wallonia budgeted 355 million euros to extend the tram line 2.9 kilometres (1.8 mi) from Coronmeuse to Herstal (Place Licourt), and 2.8 kilometres (1.7 mi) from Standard (Sclessin) to Seraing (Gare de Jemeppe). With the extensions, the line would have been 17.5 kilometres (10.9 mi) long and have had 31 stops in total. The consortium Mov'urba (consisting of the local company Galère in association with Stadsbader Contractors) was awarded the contract to construct the extensions. The consortium Tram'Ardent would have remained responsible for the installation of security systems, communication and signalization for the entire system. The extensions were expected to be completed by 2026. The budget provided for the purchase of 10 additional trams.

However, In late August 2024, the region of Wallonia decided to cancel the two extensions and replace them with reserved or priority bus lanes that would require a change of vehicle at the eastern and western termini of the tram line.

Circa 2009, there was a proposal to build another tram line between Ans and Vaux-sous-Chèvremont (Chaudfontaine).
