= Maastricht Noord railway station =

Railway station in the Netherlands

Maastricht Noord
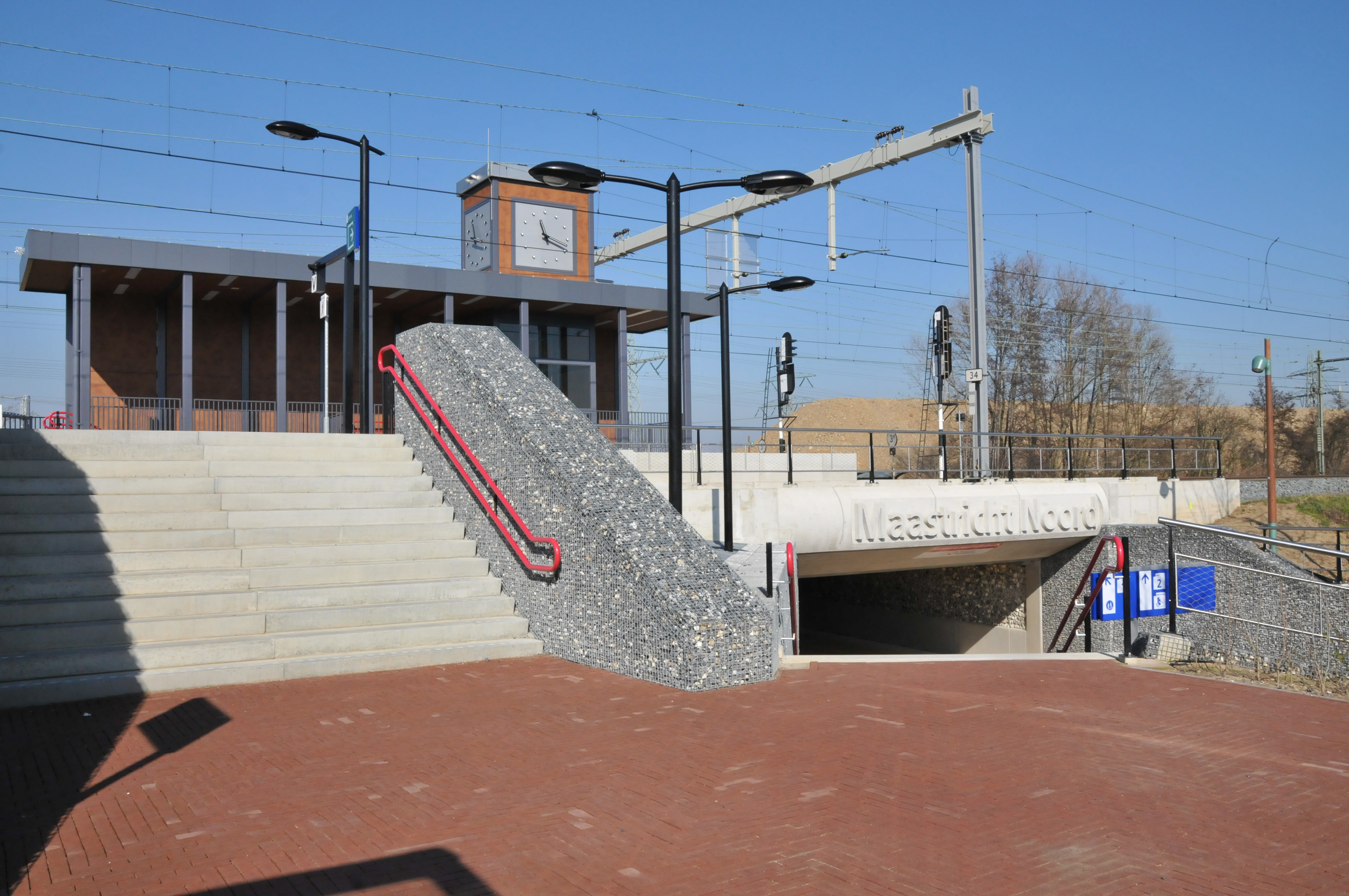

General information
- Location: Kanjelpad 20; Maastricht; Netherlands
- Coordinates: 50°52′15″N 5°43′04″E
- Line: Maastricht-Aachen railway
- Platforms: 2

Other information
- Station code: Mtn

History
- Opened: 17 November 2013

Services
Preceding station	Arriva Netherlands	Following station
Maastricht towards Maastricht Randwyck	Stoptrein 32000	Meerssen towards Heerlen
Location
- Location within Netherlands

Maastricht Noord (lit. 'Maastricht North') is a railway station in the north of Maastricht, Netherlands. Construction of the station started in March 2011 and after a few delays it opened on 17 November 2013 on the Maastricht–Aachen railway, which is part of the Heuvellandlijn. The station features 360 car parking spaces and park and ride facilities with connections to the centre of Maastricht.

== Train services ==
Maastricht Noord station is served by Arriva with the following train services:

- Local stoptrein RS18: Maastricht–Kerkrade Centrum
