= Meerssen railway station =

Railway station in the Netherlands

Meerssen Station
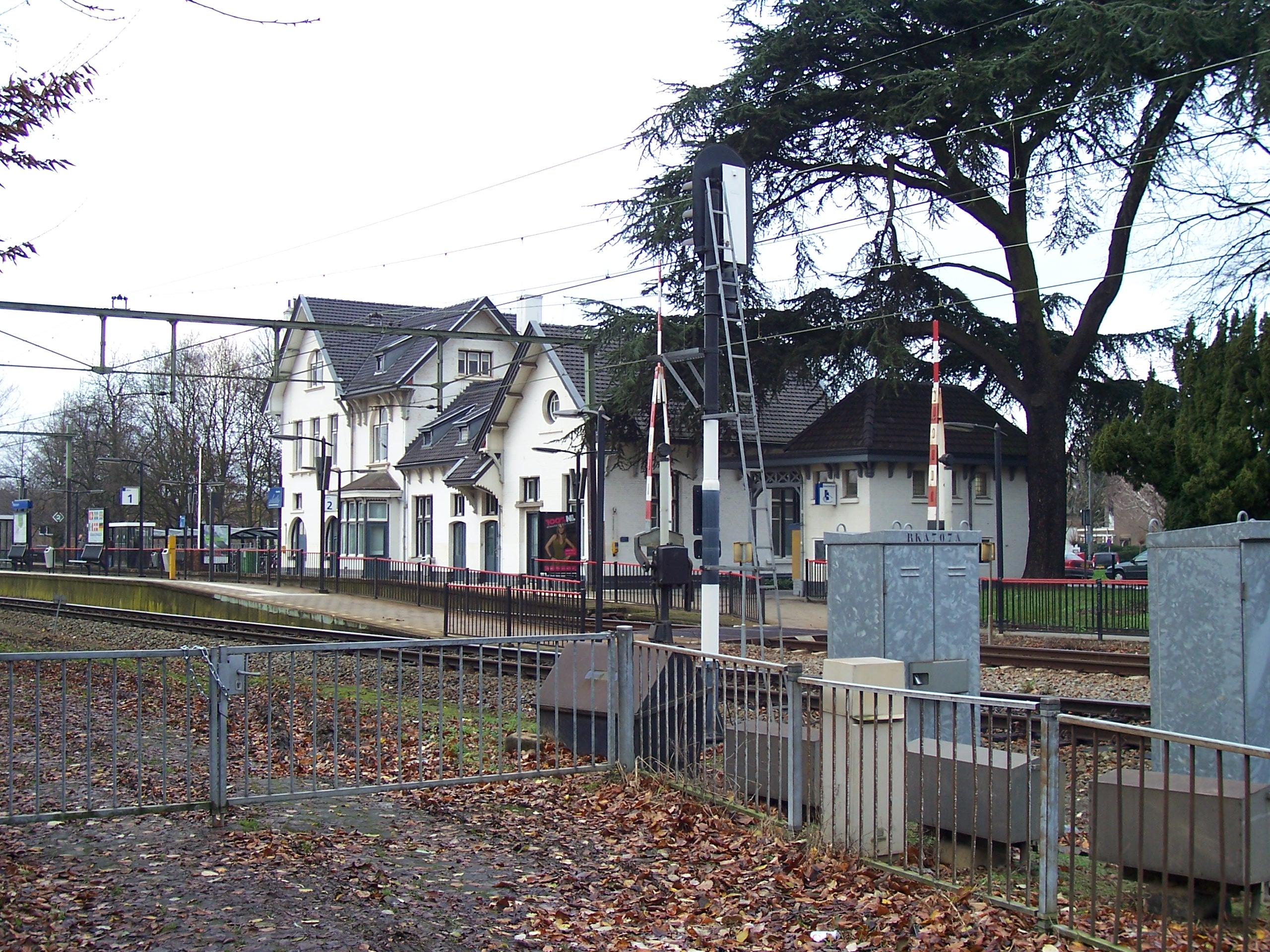

General information
- Location: Stationsplein 1 Meerssen; Netherlands
- Coordinates: 50°52′58″N 5°45′02″E
- Line: Maastricht–Aachen railway

Other information
- Station code: Mes

History
- Opened: 1853

Services
Preceding station	Arriva Netherlands	Following station
Maastricht towards Maastricht Randwyck	Sneltrein 32100	Valkenburg towards Heerlen
Maastricht Noord towards Maastricht Randwyck	Stoptrein 32000	Houthem-Sint Gerlach towards Heerlen
Maastricht towards Liège-Guillemins	RE 18; LIMAX; Drielandentrein; Dreiländerzug; Train des trois pays	Valkenburg towards Aachen Hbf
Location
- Location within Netherlands

Meerssen railway station is located in Meerssen, Netherlands. The station opened on 23 October 1853 on the Maastricht–Aachen railway. The original station building was enlarged in 1900.

== Train services ==
Meerssen station is served by Arriva with the following train services:

- Express sneltrein S5: Maastricht–Heerlen
- Express sneltrein RE 18: Aachen–Maastricht-Liége
- Local stoptrein S4: Maastricht–Heerlen

== Bus services ==
The following bus services depart from the bus stop outside the station:

- 3: Bunde–Meerssen–Rothem–Wittevrouwenveld–Amby–Centraal Station–Wolder
- 17: Meerssen–Bunde–Geulle–Beek
- 52: Meerssen–Ulestraten–Schimmert–Hulsberg–Klimmen–Voerendaal–Heerlen
