= Eijsden railway station =

Railway station in the Netherlands

Eijsden
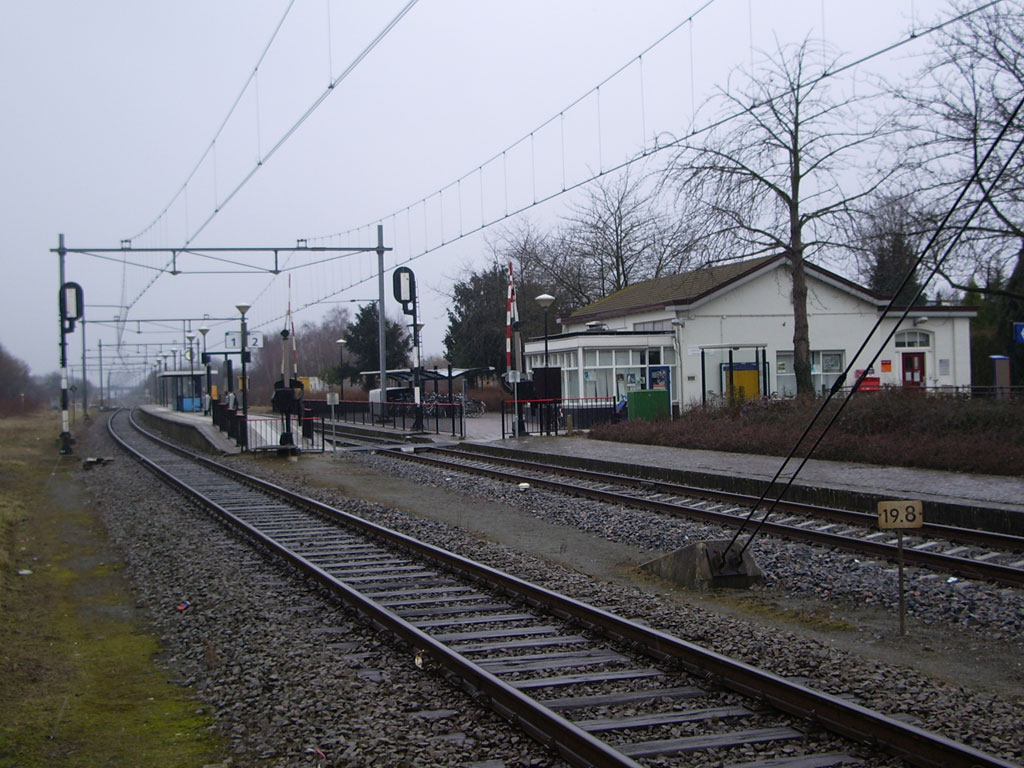
- Eijsden railway station

General information
- Location: Eijsden; Netherlands
- Coordinates: 50°46′19.06″N 5°42′36.14″E
- Operator: NMBS
- Line: spoorlijn 40
- Platforms: 2
- Tracks: 2

Construction
- Parking: yes

Other information
- Station code: Edn

History
- Opened: 24 November 1861
- Closed: 10 December 2006
- Rebuilt: 11 December 2011

Services
Preceding station	Arriva Netherlands	Following station
Visé towards Liège-Guillemins	RE 18; LIMAX; Drielandentrein; Dreiländerzug; Train des trois pays	Maastricht Randwyck towards Aachen Hbf
Location
- Location within Netherlands

Eijsden railway station is a railway station in the village of Eijsden, Limburg, Netherlands. It is the southernmost railway station in the Netherlands. The railway station is located on the railway line between Liège-Guillemins (Belgium) and Maastricht (Netherlands). Only trains of the National Railway Company of Belgium between the two stations call in Eijsden; Nederlandse Spoorwegen trains don't serve the station. It opened on 24 November 1861, and was closed between 10 December 2006 and 11 December 2011.

== Train services ==
The station is served by the following service(s):

- 1x per hour Local services (stoptrein) Hasselt - Liers - Liège - Visè - Maastricht (weekdays)
- 1x per hour Local services (stoptrein) Liège - Visè - Maastricht (weekends)

== 2006–2011 closure ==
When the National Railway Company of Belgium extended the InterCity line between Brussels-South and Liège-Guillemins to Maastricht, the regular local service between Liège-Guillemins and Maastricht was halted. The InterCity trains were too long to halt in Eijsden, so the railway station was closed. A new busline was opened between Maastricht and the railway station in Visé (Belgium) to serve Eijsden.

After the closure of the railway station, citizens of Eijsden formed the committee "Trein Terug In Eijsden" (Return the Train To Eijsden), which aimed to reopen the railway station. Overhead lines at the station carry 3 kV direct current, like the Belgian railway network, whereas the Dutch railway network carries 1.5 kV. Regular Dutch electric trains are not able to reach Eijsden unless they are multi-system units. As of 11 December 2011 Eijsden is again being served by Belgian trains, thus reopening the station after a 5-year closure.

== See also ==
- List of busiest railway stations in the Netherlands
- Soest (Netherlands) railway station
