= Maastricht railway station =

Railway station in the Netherlands

Maastricht

General information
- Location: Stationsplein, Maastricht, Limburg, Netherlands
- Coordinates: 50°51′00″N 5°42′19″E
- Lines: Maastricht–Venlo railway Maastricht–Aachen railway Liège–Maastricht railway
- Tracks: 17

Other information
- Station code: Mt

History
- Opened: 23 October 1853; 172 years ago
Services
Preceding station	Nederlandse Spoorwegen	Following station
Sittard towards Alkmaar	NS Intercity 2700 Mon-Thur until 19:00	Terminus
Sittard towards Enkhuizen	NS Intercity 2900 After 19:00 and Fri-Sun only	Terminus
Preceding station	Arriva Netherlands	Following station
Meerssen towards Heerlen	Sneltrein 32100	Maastricht Randwyck Terminus
Maastricht Noord towards Heerlen	Stoptrein 32000	Maastricht Randwyck Terminus
Bunde towards Roermond	Stoptrein 32400	Maastricht Randwyck Terminus
Maastricht Randwyck towards Liège-Guillemins	RE 18; LIMAX; Drielandentrein; Dreiländerzug; Train des trois pays	Meerssen towards Aachen Hbf
Sittard towards Schiphol Airport	Nachttrein 32710 Friday night only	Terminus
Location
- Location within Netherlands

Maastricht railway station (Dutch: Station Maastricht [staːˈɕɔ maːˈstrɪxt]; Limburgish: Statie Mestreech [ˈstaː˦si məˈstʀeːx]) is located in Maastricht in Limburg, Netherlands. It is the main railway station in Limburg's capital city. It is the southern terminus of the Alkmaar–Maastricht intercity service by NS. Additionally, Arriva and the Belgian NMBS serve the station with local trains.

== History ==
The station opened on 23 October 1853 together with the Maastricht–Aachen railway. In 1856, a railway connection to Hasselt was opened. Both lines are now (partially) closed. In 1861, the Liège-Maastricht railway connection was opened. It was not until the opening of the Maastricht–Venlo railway in 1865 that Maastricht was connected to the rest of the Netherlands.

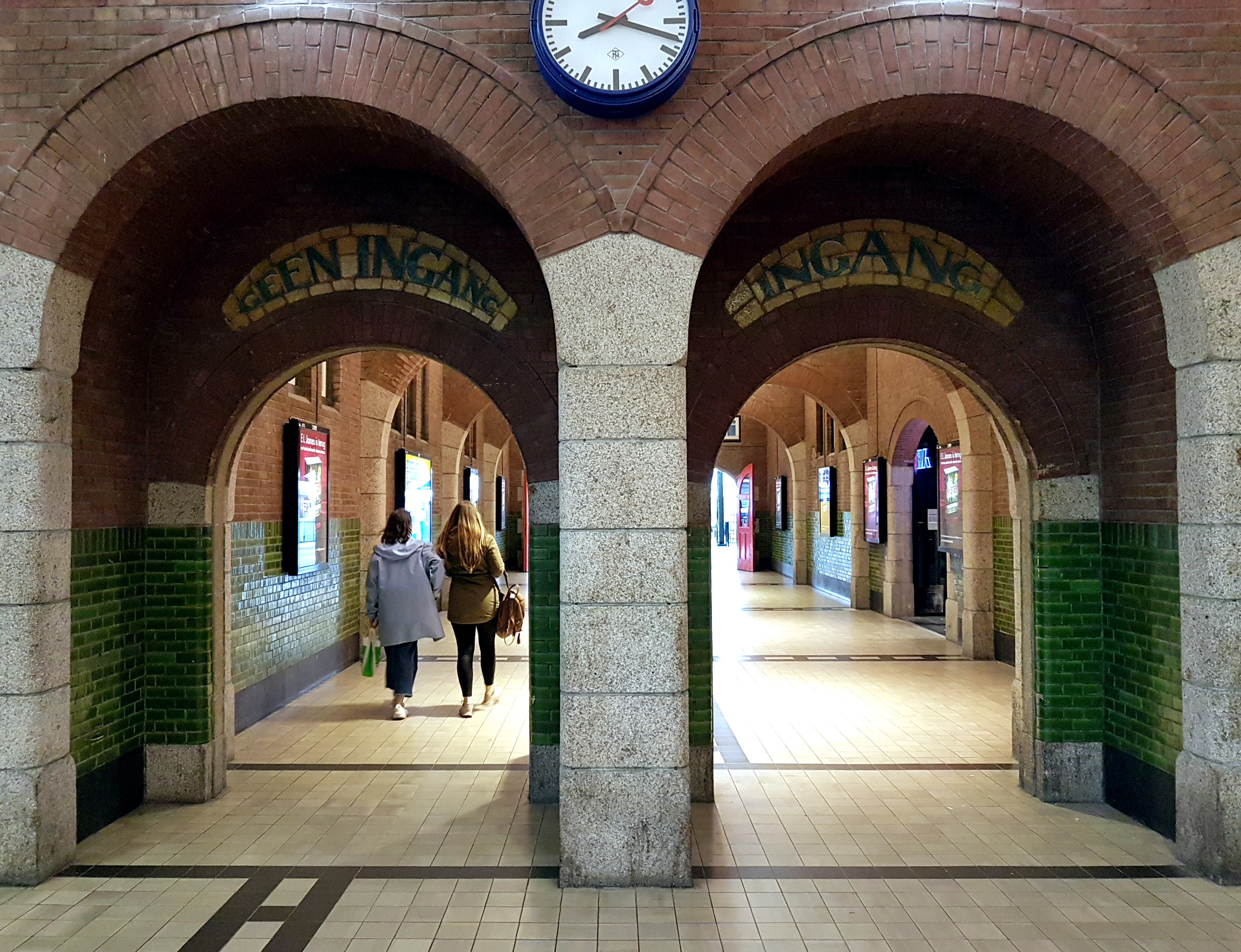
Hallway connecting the main hall to the platforms 1, 2 and 3 and the bus station. Old signs are still visible above the tunnels from the days that border customs were present in this station.

Due to the fortified character of the town, the first railway station was in fact situated outside Maastricht, within the municipality of Meerssen. The first station was built out of wood, so that in case of attack it could quickly be demolished. The municipal borders were adjusted in 1907, making the station part of the municipality of Maastricht. The current brick building was built in 1913, designed by George Willem van Heukelom. Due to its international connection, the station housed border customs. Even though Belgian trains from Liège still terminate at Maastricht, passport and security checks have gone with the implementation of the Schengen Agreement. The former customs space is now used for small shops such as a florist, an Albert Heijn, a HEMA, Snackbars, and a Starbucks.

=== Improvements to the railway station ===
There was a plan to reopen the line to Hasselt as a tramway. Twice an hour, a tram was to run from Maastricht station through the town centre to the nearby town of Lanaken, and further as a light rail train to Bilzen and Hasselt. The line was planned to open in 2018 but was first of all curtailed to the town centre because the bridge was too weak, then postponed until 2024, and finally cancelled in 2022.

In June 2024, the Liège-Guillemins to Maastricht service by National Railway Company of Belgium train line was replaced by Arriva. The service will run from Liège-Guillemins to Aachen Hbf via Maastricht. The service will stop at the following stations: Liège-Guillemins – Bressoux – Visé – Eijsden – Maastricht Randwijck – Maastricht - Meerssen - Valkenburg – Heerlen – Landgraaf - Herzogenrath - Aachen West - Aachen Hbf

== Train services ==
The following train services call at this station:

- NS intercity: (Schagen–)Alkmaar–Amsterdam–Utrecht–Eindhoven–Maastricht
- Arriva sneltrein RE 18: Maastricht–Meerssen–Valkenburg–Heerlen–Herzogenrath–Aachen
- Arriva stoptrein RS 18: Maastricht Randwyck–Meerssen–Valkenburg-Heerlen
- Arriva stoptrein RS 12: Maastricht Randwyck–Maastricht–Sittard-Roermond
- SNCB/NMBS regional S 43: Liège–Visé–Maastricht

== Bus services ==
=== City buses ===
- 1: Malberg–Brusselse Poort–Maastricht City Centre–Maastricht Central Station–Maastricht Randwyck–De Heeg
- 2: Oud Caberg–Brusselse Poort–Maastricht City Centre–Maastricht Central Station–Maastricht Randwyck–De Heeg
- 3: Wolder–Biesland–Jekerkwartier–Maastricht City Centre–Maastricht Central Station–Wittevrouwenveld–Nazareth
- 4: Maastricht(–Pottenberg–Jekerkwartier–City Centre–Central Station–Wittevrouwenveld)–Berg en Terblijt–Valkenburg
- 5: Daalhof–Mariaberg–Maastricht City Centre–Maastricht Central Station–Maastricht Randwyck–Heugem–Oost-Maarland–Eijsden
- 6: Daalhof–Mariaberg–Maastricht City Centre–Maastricht Central Station–Wittevrouwenveld–Amby
- 7: Malpertuis–Caberg–Maastricht City Centre–Maastricht Central Station–Maastricht City Centre–Jekerdal–Villapark
- 8: Maastricht(–Boschpoort–City Centre–Central Station–Wittevrouwenveld)–Bemelen–Sibbe–Valkenburg
- 9: Maastricht Central Station–Beatrixhaven–Borgharen–Itteren–Bunde

=== Night buses ===
- N1: Malberg–Brusselse Poort–Maastricht City Centre–Maastricht Central Station–Randwyck–De Heeg
- N4: Maastricht City Centre–Scharn–Wittevrouwenveld–Berg en Terblijt–Valkenburg

=== Regional buses ===
- 15: Eijsden- Maastricht
- 30: Sittard–Geleen–Beek–MAA–Meerssen–Maastricht
- 57: Maastricht–Gronsveld–Eckelrade–St. Geertruid–Mheer–Noorbeek–Heyenrath–Epen–Mechelen–Partij–Gulpen
- 350 (Limburgliner): Maastricht–Cadier en Keer–Margraten–Gulpen–Wahlwiller–Nijswiller–Lemiers–Vaals–Aachen
- 610 (school line): Simpelveld–Bocholtz–Nijswiller–Wahlwiller–Gulpen–Margraten–Cadier en Keer–Maastricht

=== Airport Connection Buses ===
- KLM: Maastricht railway station-Maastricht-Eindhoven-Amsterdam
