= Liège-Guillemins railway station =

Railway station in Liège, Belgium

Liège-Guillemins
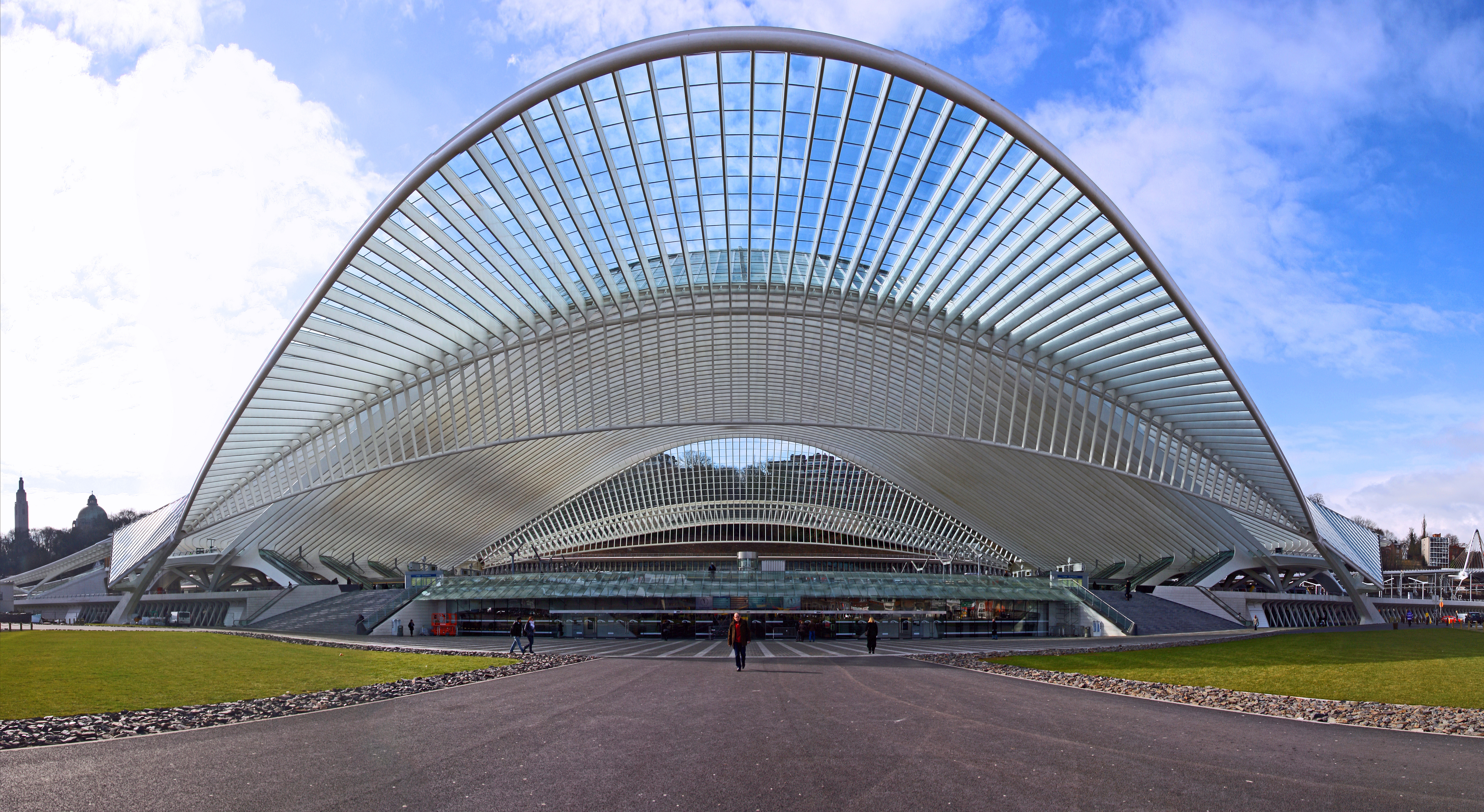
- Liège-Guillemins railway station

General information
- Location: Place des Guillemins, 4000 Liège; Belgium
- Coordinates: 50°37′29″N 5°34′01″E
- System: Railway Station
- Owner: SNCB/NMBS
- Operator: SNCB/NMBS
- Lines: 4, 34, 36, 37, 40, 43, 125
- Platforms: 5
- Tracks: 9

Construction
- Architect: Santiago Calatrava

Other information
- IATA code: XHN

History
- Opened: 1 May 1842
- Rebuilt: 1863, 1882, 1905, 1958, 2009

Passengers
- 2009: 6.26 million

Services
Preceding station	Eurostar	Following station
Brussels-South towards Paris-Nord	Eurostar	Aachen Hbf towards Dortmund Hbf
Preceding station	DB Fernverkehr	Following station
Leuven towards Antwerpen-Centraal	ICE 79	Aachen Hbf towards Frankfurt (Main) Hbf
Brussels-North towards Brussels-South	ICE 79	Aachen Hbf towards Frankfurt (Main) Hbf
Preceding station	Arriva Netherlands	Following station
Terminus	RE 18; LIMAX; Drielandentrein; Dreiländerzug; Train des trois pays	Bressoux towards Aachen Hbf
Preceding station	NMBS/SNCB	Following station
Leuven towards Oostende	IC 01	Verviers-Central towards Eupen
Liège-Carré towards Antwerpen-Centraal	IC 09 weekends	Terminus
Leuven towards Kortrijk	IC 12 weekdays	Angleur towards Welkenraedt
Ans towards Quiévrain	IC 14 weekdays	Terminus
Liège-Carré towards Bruxelles-Midi / Brussel-Zuid	IC 18 weekdays	Terminus
Flemalle-Haute towards Mons	IC 25 weekdays	Liège-Carré towards Herstal
Flemalle-Haute towards Mouscron	IC 25 weekends	Liège-Carré towards Liers
Liège-Carré towards Liers	IC 33	Angleur towards Luxembourg
Terminus	S 43	Bressoux towards Maastricht
Sclessin towards Namur	L 01	Terminus
Liège-Carré towards Liers	L 15	Angleur towards Marloie
Liège-Carré towards Herstal	L 17	Angleur towards Verviers-Centraal
Ans towards Waremme	L 21 weekdays	Terminus
Ans towards Landen	L 21 weekends	Terminus
Location
- Location within Belgium Location within Europe

Liège-Guillemins railway station (French: Gare de Liège-Guillemins; Dutch: Station Luik-Guillemins) (Note: Officially Liège-Guillemins (French: Liège-Guillemins; Dutch: Luik-Guillemins)) is the main station in Liège, Belgium. It is one of the most important hubs in the country and is one of the four Belgian stations on the high-speed rail network. The station is used by 15,000 people every day, which makes it the eleventh-busiest station in Belgium and the third in Wallonia. It is operated by the National Railway Company of Belgium (SNCB/NMBS).

== History ==
=== First station (1842–1863) ===
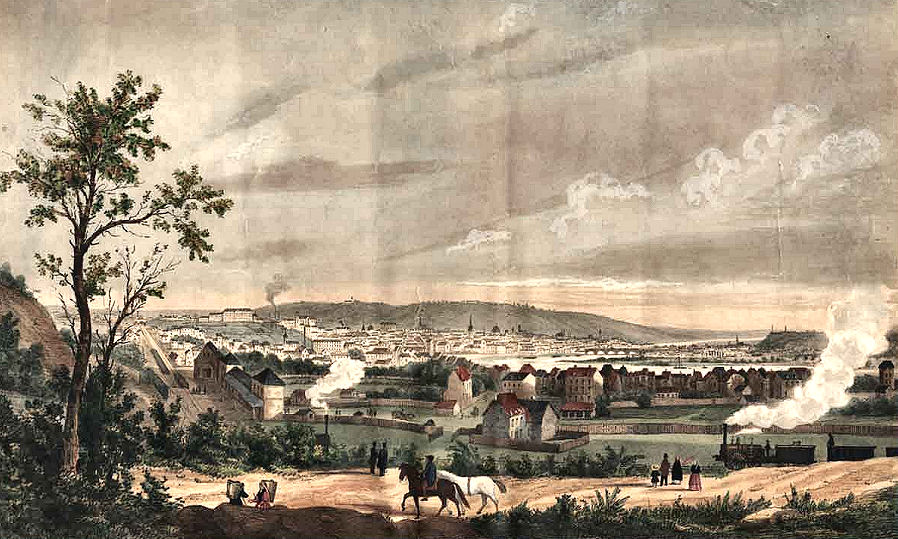
View of the Guillemins district, with the first Liège-Guillemins railway station, c. 1845

The choice to make Liège the crossing point of a railway goes back to the first sketches of the railway from Antwerp to the Rhine, drawn up just after the Belgian Revolution. A royal decree issued on 21 March 1832 mentions it and a law dated 1 May 1834 provides for the creation of four lines, including the "eastern line", from Mechelen to Liège and the Prussian border.

In 1838, only three years after the first continental railway, a line linking Brussels and Ans, in the northern suburbs of Liège, was opened. With the arrival of the railway, Liège needed an interior station. In 1842, a wooden construction was erected on the site of the former convent of the Guillemites. This first Liège-Guillemins railway station was inaugurated in May 1842, linking the valley to the upper Ans station. The Guillemins site, located slightly outside the city centre, was chosen for technical reasons over the local preference for the Place Saint-Lambert. In 1843, the first international railway connection was born, linking Liège to Aachen and Cologne (Germany).

=== Second and third stations (1863–2009) ===
The Belgian State, choosing to go against the city authorities who demanded the relocation of the station to the city centre, built a new station in 1863 to replace the original wooden one. Its massive structure and its large French-style fan-shaped canopy illuminating the waiting room were its pride. The architect A.P.J. Lambeau, principal engineer for the Ministry of Railways, was particularly inspired by the buildings of the Gare du Nord and Gare de l'Est stations in Paris. Lambeau is also the architect of the Charleroi-Sud and Namur stations, restored in the 2000s.

The station was modernised and improved in 1882 and in 1905 for the World's Fair in Liège. This Beaux-Arts station was replaced in 1958 by a much criticised "modern" International style building that was used until June 2009, a few months before the opening of the new Calatrava-designed station. The second station was completely demolished to allow the completion of the remaining sections of the new station.

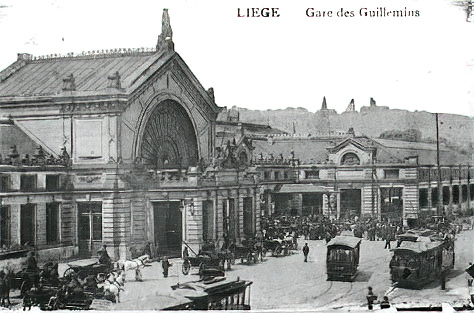
The second Liège-Guillemins railway station (1882), pictured in 1905

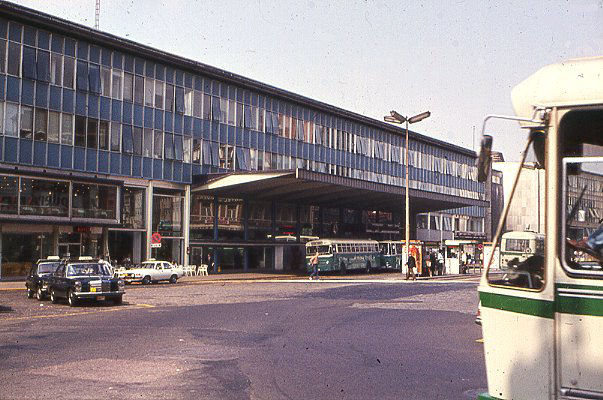
The third Liège-Guillemins railway station (1958), pictured in the 1970s

=== Current station (2009–present) ===
At the end of the 20th century, high-speed trains were introduced, requiring a new station since the existing platforms were too small. The new station, by the Spanish architect Santiago Calatrava, was officially opened on 18 September 2009, with a show by the stage director Franco Dragone. It has nine tracks and five platforms (three of 450 metres (1,480 ft) and two of 350 metres (1,150 ft)). All the tracks around the station have been modernised to allow high-speed arrival and departure.

The new station is made of steel, glass and white concrete. It includes a monumental arch, 160 metres (520 ft) long and 32 metres (105 ft) high. The building costs were €312 million.

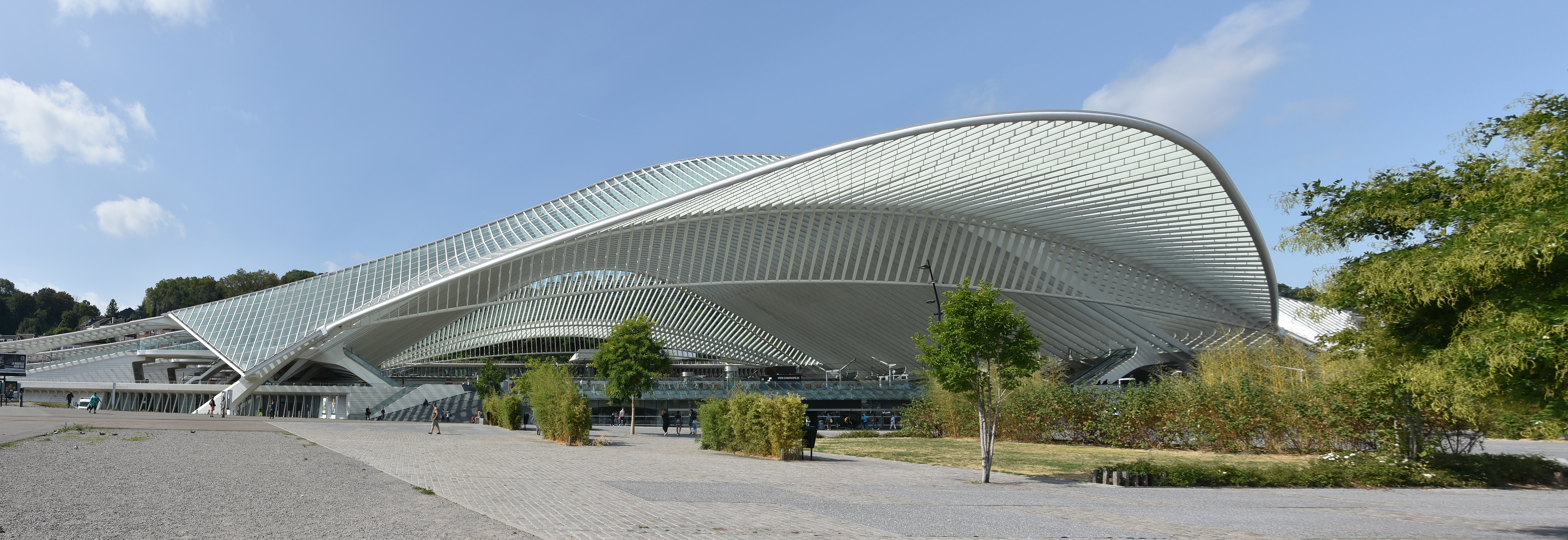
The fourth (current) Liège-Guillemins railway station designed by Santiago Calatrava (2009), pictured in 2018

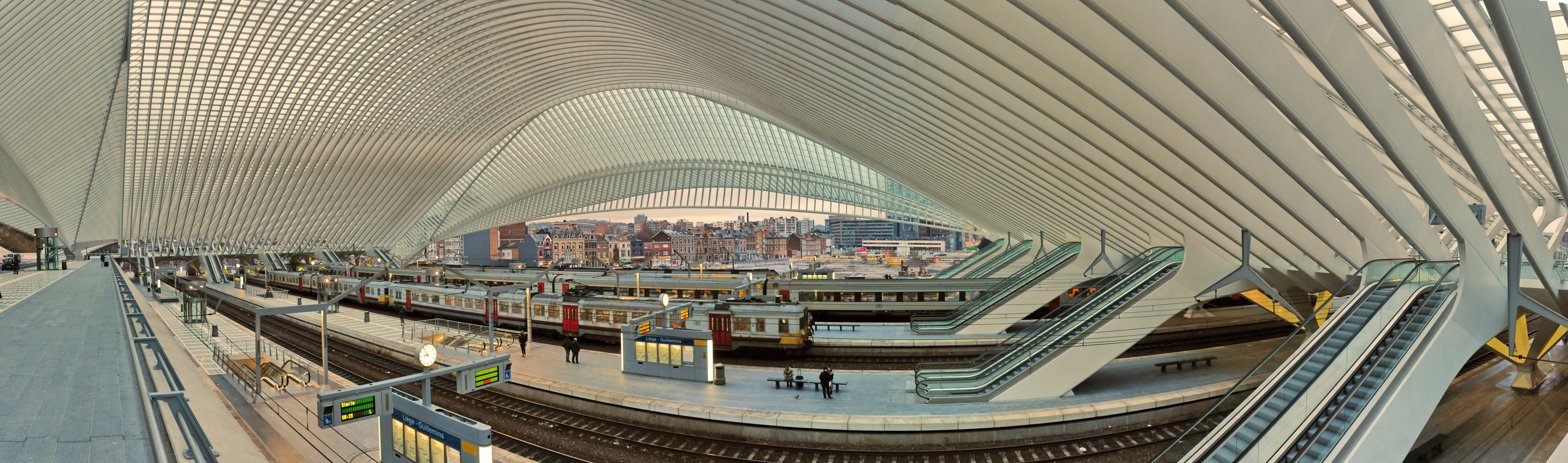
Inside view of the current station, in 2013

== Services ==
Liège-Guillemins station is served by InterCity (IC) and Local (L) trains along with the Liège S Train system connecting Liège with all major Belgian cities as well as several international destinations such as Aachen, Lille, and Maastricht. In addition to the national trains, Liège-Guillemins station welcomes Eurostar and ICE trains, connecting Liège to Brussels, Paris, Aachen, Cologne and Frankfurt. Two new dedicated high-speed tracks were built: HSL 2 (Brussels–Liège) and HSL 3 (Liège–German border).

The station is served by the following services:

- High speed services (Eurostar) Paris - Brussels - Liège - Aachen - Cologne - Düsseldorf - Essen - Dortmund
- High speed services (ICE) Brussels - Liège - Aachen - Cologne - Frankfurt
- Intercity services (IC 01) Ostend - Bruges - Gent - Brussels - Leuven - Liège - Welkenraedt - Eupen
- Intercity services (IC 09) Antwerp - Lier - Aarschot - Hasselt - Liège (weekends)
- Intercity services (IC 12) Kortrijk - Gent - Brussels - Leuven - Liège - Welkenraedt (weekdays)
- Intercity services (IC 14) Quiévrain - Mons - Braine-le-Comte - Brussels - Leuven - Liège (weekdays)
- Intercity services (IC 18) (Tournai -) Brussels - Namur - Liège (weekdays)
- Intercity services (IC 25) Mons - Charleroi - Namur - Huy - Liège - Herstal (weekdays)
- Intercity services (IC 25) Mouscron - Tournai - Mons - Charleroi - Namur - Liège - Liers (weekends)
- Intercity services (IC 33) Liège - Gouvy - Troisvierges - Luxembourg (weekdays)
- Intercity services (IC 33) Liers - Liège - Gouvy - Troisvierges - Luxembourg (weekends)
- Local services (L 01) Namur - Huy - Liège
- Local services (L 15) Liers - Liège - Rivage - Marloie
- Regional S Train (S41) Liège - Pepinster - Verviers (weekdays)
- Regional S Train (S41) Herstal - Liège - Pepinster - Verviers (weekends)
- Regional S Train (S42) Liers - Liège - Seraing - Flémalle-Haute
- Regional S Train (S43) Hasselt - Tongeren - Liège - Visé - Maastricht (weekdays)
- Regional S Train (S43) Liège - Visé - Maastricht (weekends)
- Regional S Train (S44) Liège - Ans - Waremme (weekdays)
- Regional S Train (S44) Liège - Ans - Waremme - Landen (weekends)

Liège-Guillemins also sees various Peak (P) trains during the week.

The national trains to Brussels also use the high speed line at 200 km/h (120 mph), while Eurostar and ICE can go up to 300 km/h (190 mph) (connecting Brussels and Liège in 39 minutes).

In June 2024, the Liège-Guillemins to Maastricht service by National Railway Company of Belgium train line will be replaced by an Arriva service but will be staffed by National Railway Company of Belgium personnel through the Belgian border. The service will run from Liège-Guillemins to Aachen Hbf via Maastricht. The service will stop at the following stations: Liège-Guillemins – Bressoux – Visé – Eijsden – Maastricht Randwijck – Maastricht - Meerssen - Valkenburg – Heerlen – Landgraaf - Herzogenrath - Aachen West - Aachen Hbf. It is not yet known if OV-chipkaart readers will be installed at the station.

== Connections ==
Liège-Guillemins is also a transport hub for TEC buses and trams. The tram line, opened on 28 April 2025, serves the station at a stop in Place des Guillemins in front of the station. Before the opening of the tram line, more than 1620 buses carried 15,000 people daily at the station.

Liège-Guillemins is one of the few railway stations in Europe directly connected to a motorway (E40-E25). The connection gives direct access to the 850-place parking structure, behind the station. No cycling path connection exists between the station and the city.

== Gallery ==
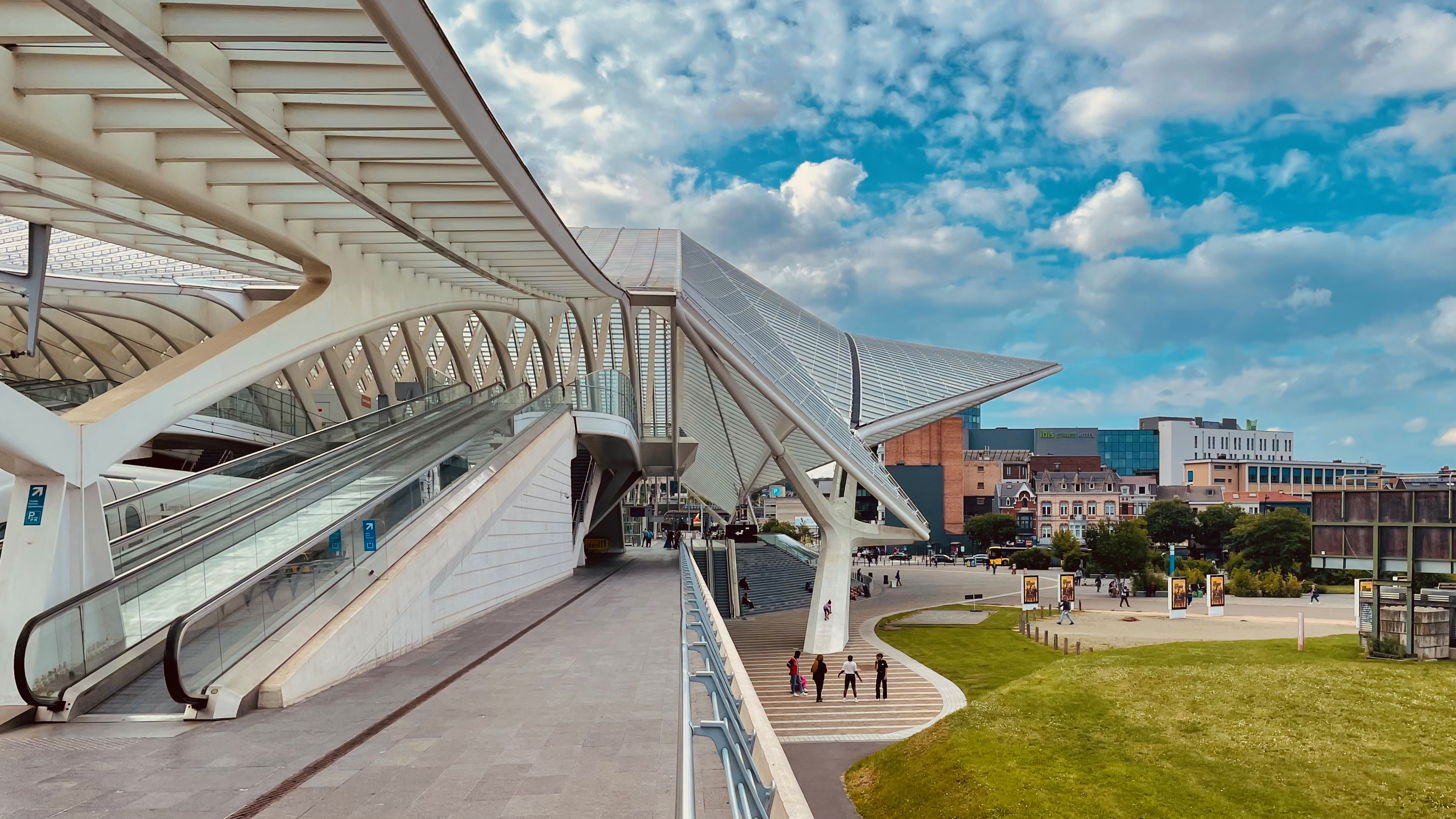
Lateral view

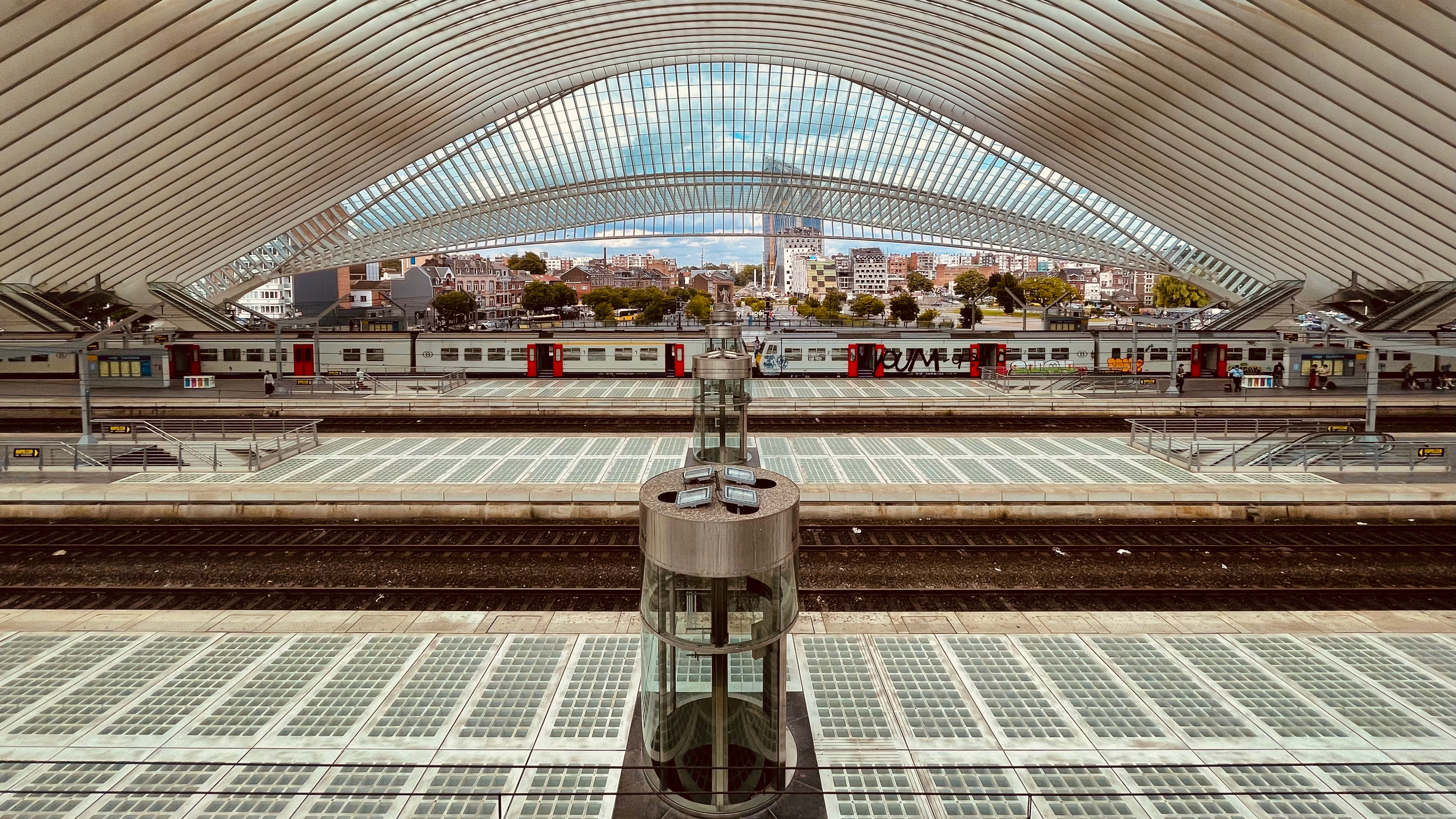
View of the platforms

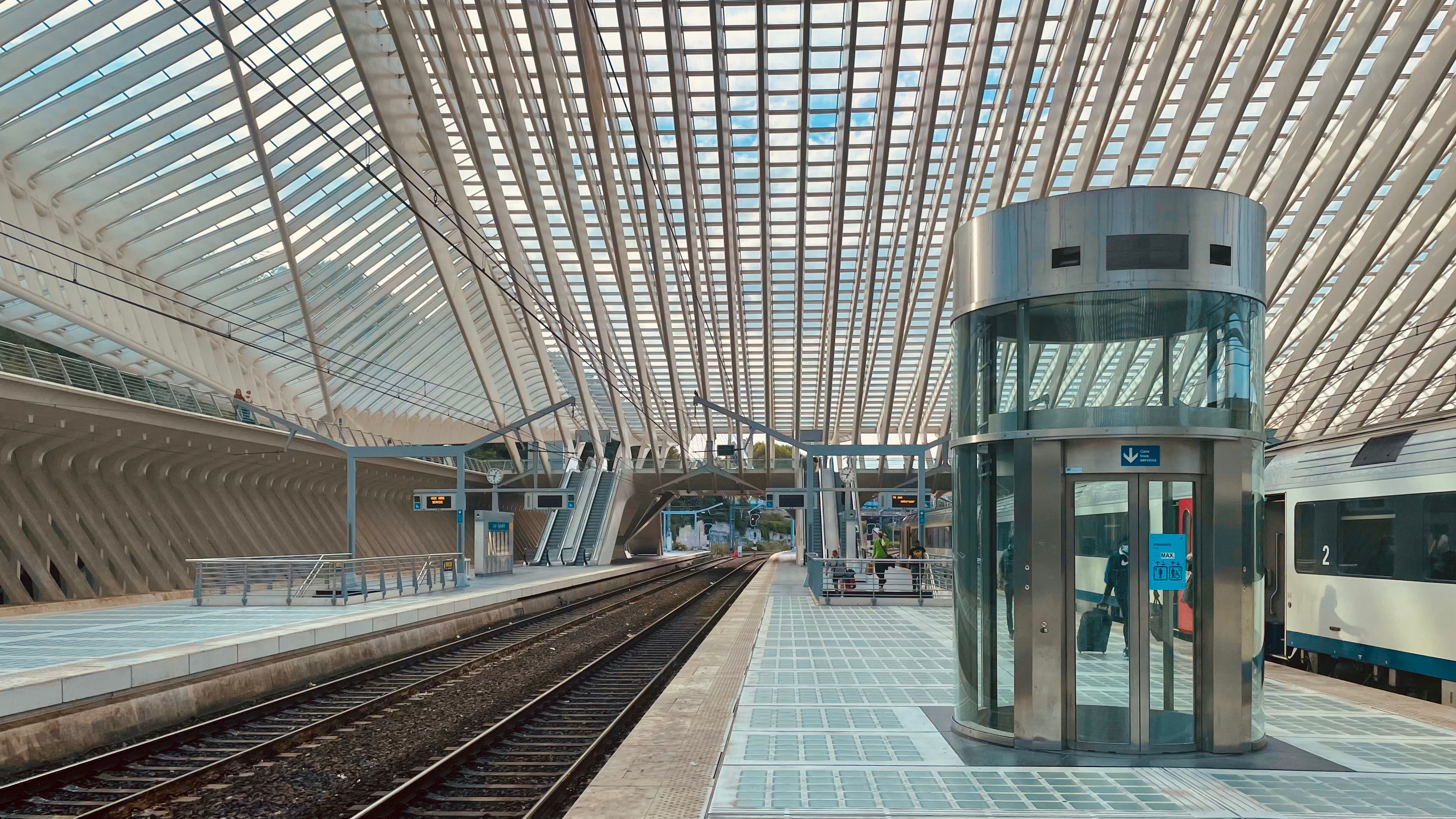
View of the platforms and tracks

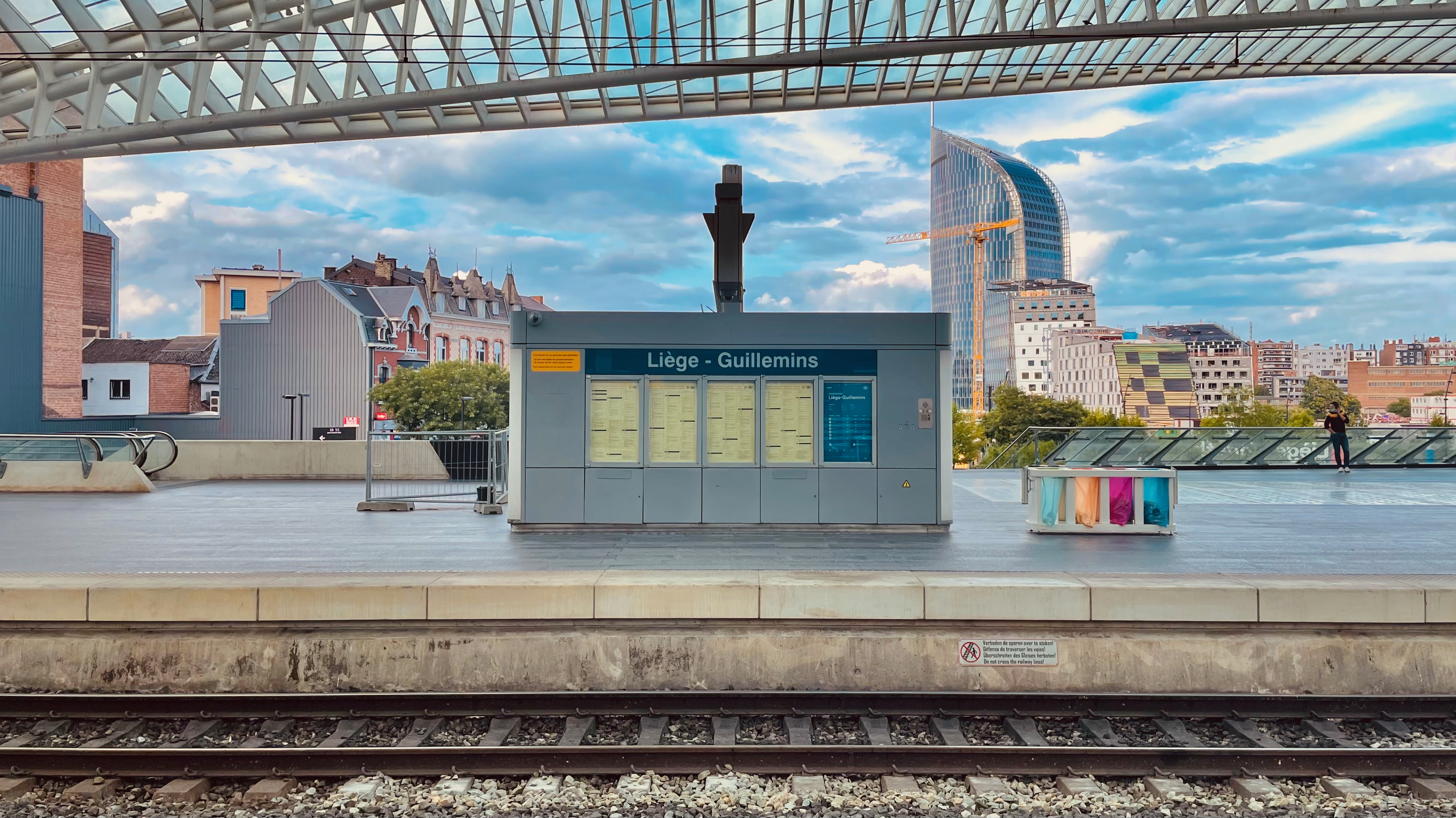
Place name sign on a platform

== See also ==
- List of railway stations in Belgium
- List of TGV stations
- High-speed rail in Belgium
- Rail transport in Belgium
