= Valkenburg railway station =

Railway station in the Netherlands

Valkenburg
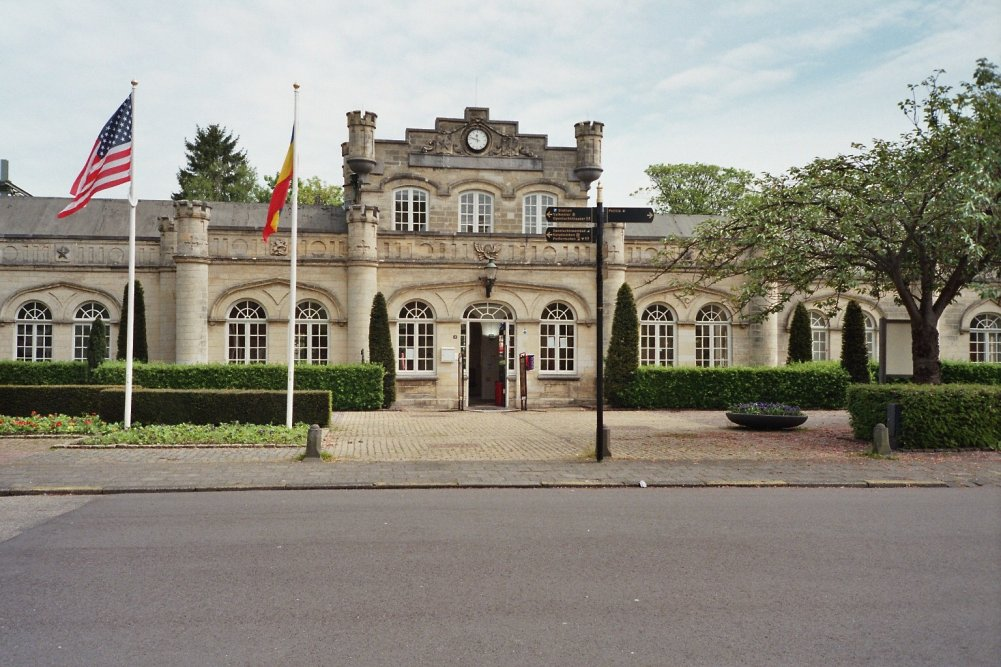

General information
- Location: Stationsstraat 10; Netherlands
- Coordinates: 50°52′09″N 5°49′58″E
- Line: Maastricht–Aachen railway

Other information
- Station code: Vk

History
- Opened: 23 October 1853

Services
Preceding station	Arriva Netherlands	Following station
Meerssen towards Maastricht Randwyck	Sneltrein 32100	Heerlen Terminus
Houthem-Sint Gerlach towards Maastricht Randwyck	Stoptrein 32000	Schin op Geul towards Heerlen
Meerssen towards Liège-Guillemins	RE 18; LIMAX; Drielandentrein; Dreiländerzug; Train des trois pays	Heerlen towards Aachen Hbf
Location
- Location within Netherlands

Valkenburg railway station is located in Valkenburg aan de Geul, Netherlands. The station was opened on 23 October 1853 and is located on the Maastricht–Aachen railway. The station building is the oldest in the Netherlands.

== Train services ==
Valkenburg station is served by Arriva with the following train services:

- Express sneltrein S5: Maastricht–Heerlen
- Express sneltrein RE 18: Aachen–Maastricht
- Local stoptrein S4: Maastricht–Heerlen
