= Bressoux =

Bressoux Bressou (Walloon)
- Sub-municipality of Liège
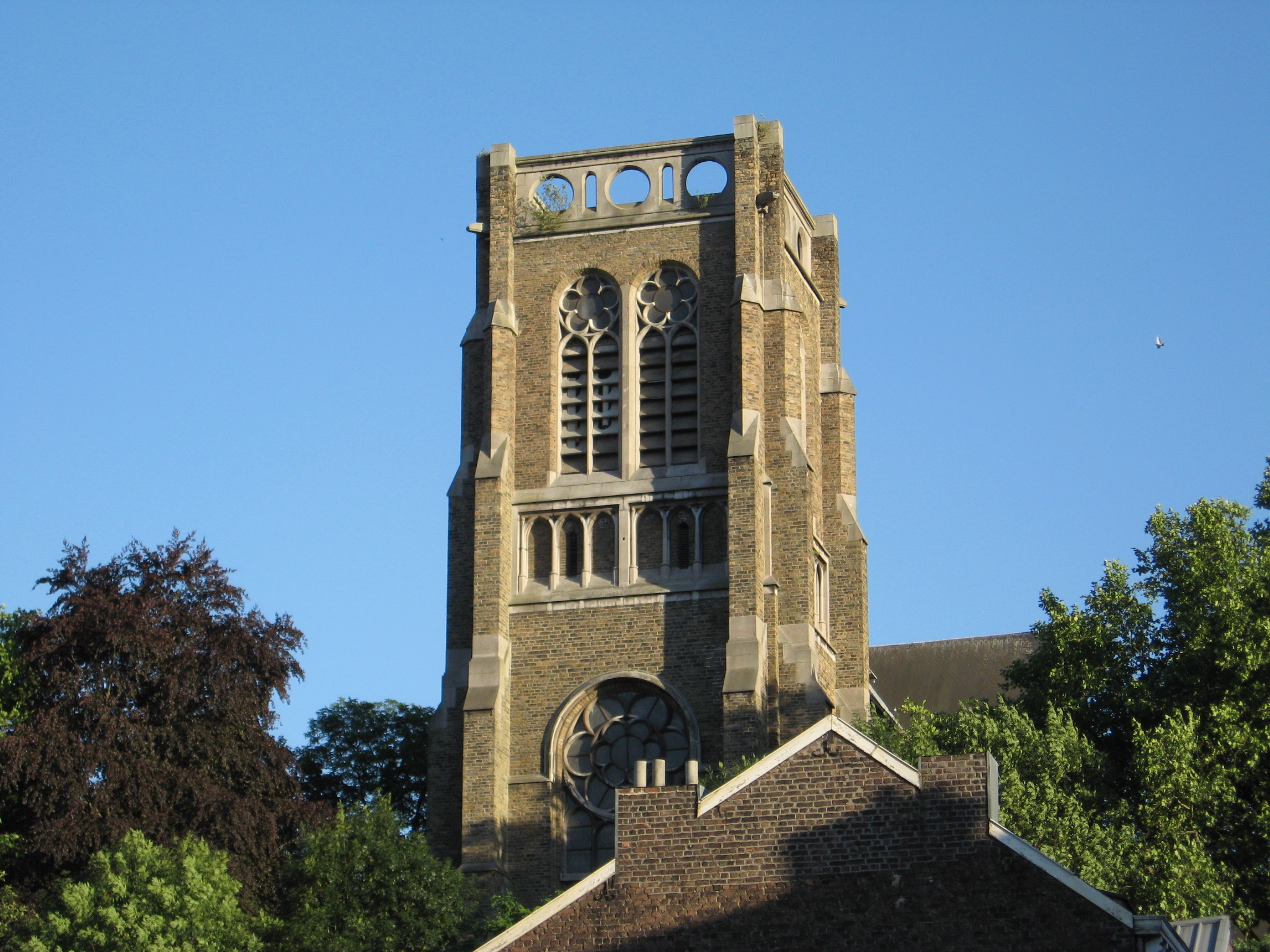
- Notre-Dame-de-Lourdes Church

- Location in Liège
- Interactive map of Bressoux
- Location within Belgium Location within Liège Province
- Coordinates: 50°38′29″N 5°36′40″E
- Country: Belgium
- Community: French Community
- Region: Wallonia
- Province: Liège
- Arrondissement: Liège
- Municipality: Liège

Area
  - Total: 2.02 km^{2} (0.78 sq mi)

Population (2020-01-01)
  - Total: 12,579
  - Density: 6,230/km^{2} (16,100/sq mi)
- Postal codes: 4020
- Area codes: 04

Bressoux (French pronunciation: [bʁesu]; Walloon: Bressou) is a sub-municipality of the city of Liège located in the province of Liège, Wallonia, Belgium. The area is in the north-east of the city. Bressoux has a railway station on the Liège-Maastricht line.

Bressoux consists of three divisions:

- Droixhe
- Bressoux-Haut
- Bressoux-Bas

== History ==
The municipality of Bressoux was formed on 1 July 1871, when it was detached from the municipality of Grivegnée. On 1 January 1977, it was merged into Liège.

== Nature and landscape ==
Bressoux lies on the Maas river and the Liège Drainage Canal. The Pont de Bressoux (Bressoux bridge) crosses the Canal and connects with the district of Outremeuse. The Pont Atlas (Atlas bridge) crosses the Maas and connects to the districts of Coronmeuse and Saint-Léonard.

Bressoux-Bas lies on the Maas plains. In the south-eastern direction there is a large graveyard and a bus depot.

== Born in Bressoux ==
Jean Nicolay (1937-2014), an ex-footballer (goalkeeper) for Standard Liège and the Belgian national team.
