= Jabeek =

- Village
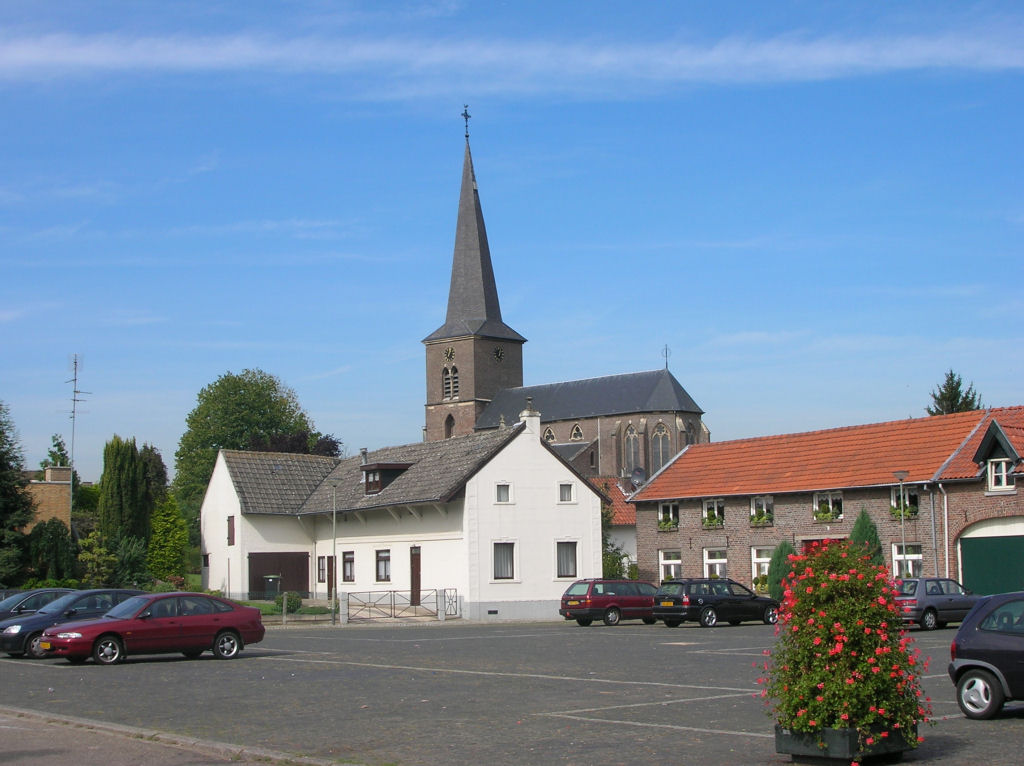
- Jabeek met Gertrudiskerk

- Location in the Netherlands Location in the province of Limburg in the Netherlands
- Coordinates: 50°58′54″N 5°56′29″E
- Country: Netherlands
- Province: Limburg
- Municipality: Beekdaelen

Area
  - Total: 3.89 km^{2} (1.50 sq mi)
- Elevation: 66 m (217 ft)

Population (2021)
  - Total: 705
  - Density: 181/km^{2} (469/sq mi)
- Time zone: UTC+1 (CET)
  - Summer (DST): UTC+2 (CEST)
- Postal code: 6454
- Dialing code: 046

Jabeek (Limburgish: Jaobik, English: Yescreek) is a village in the Dutch province of Limburg. It is located in the municipality of Beekdaelen, on the German border about 8 km east of Geleen. Jabeek borders on the German village Süsterseel.

== History ==
The village was first mentioned in 1144 as "apud Iabeche". The etymology is unclear. Jabeek developed in the Early Middle Ages as a cultivation village.

The Catholic St Gertrudis is a three-aisled basilica-like church with a needle spire. The tower was built in the 15th century. The church was rebuilt between 1858 and 1859 after a design by Joseph Cuypers and the tower was enlarged. The farm Etzenradehuuske was built in 1710 and was part of a castle which was demolished in 1880.

Jabeek was home to 344 people in 1840. Jabeek was a separate municipality until 1982, when it was merged into Onderbanken. In 2019, it became part of the municipality of Beekdaelen.

== Gallery ==
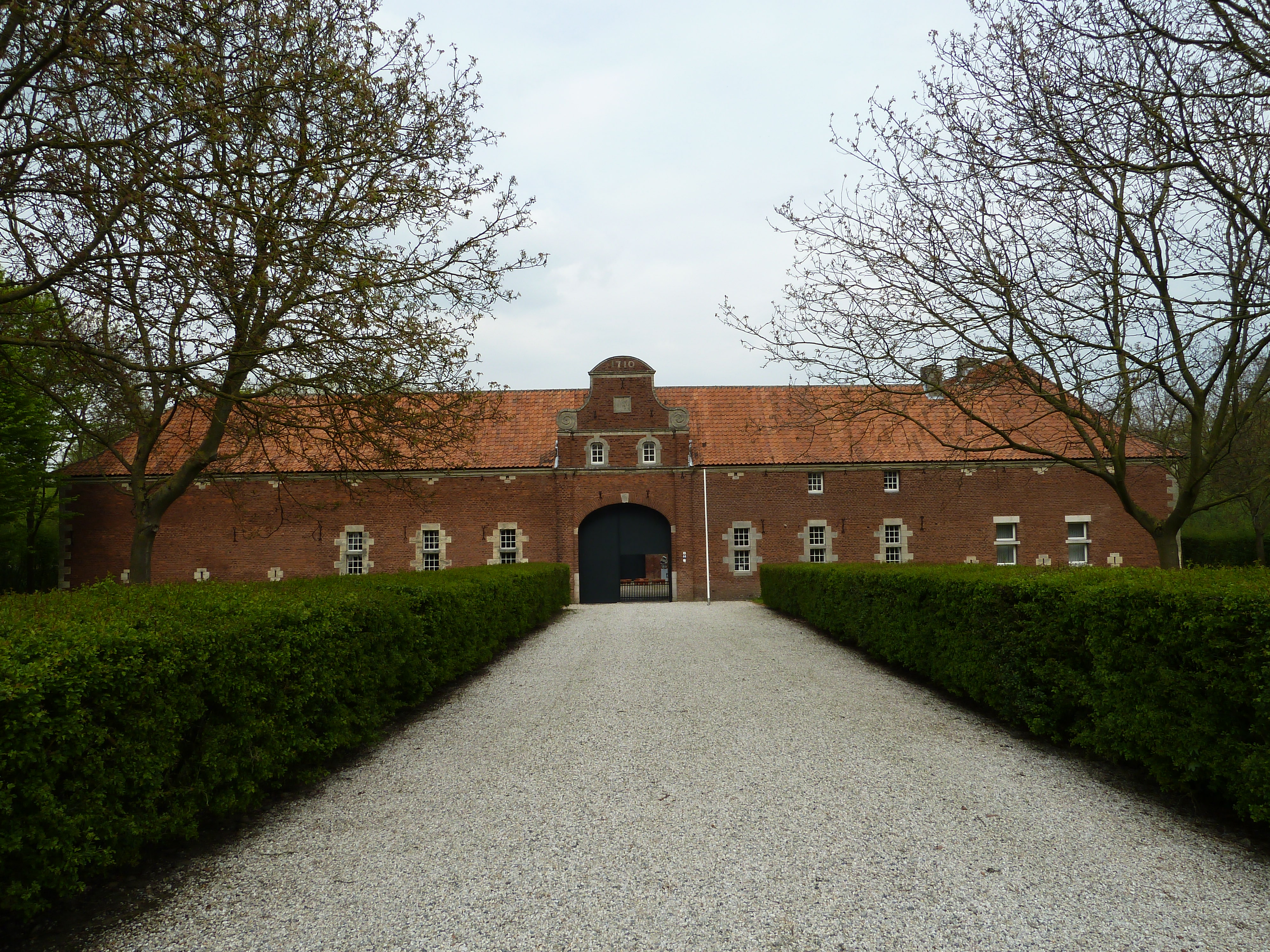
Etzenradehuuske

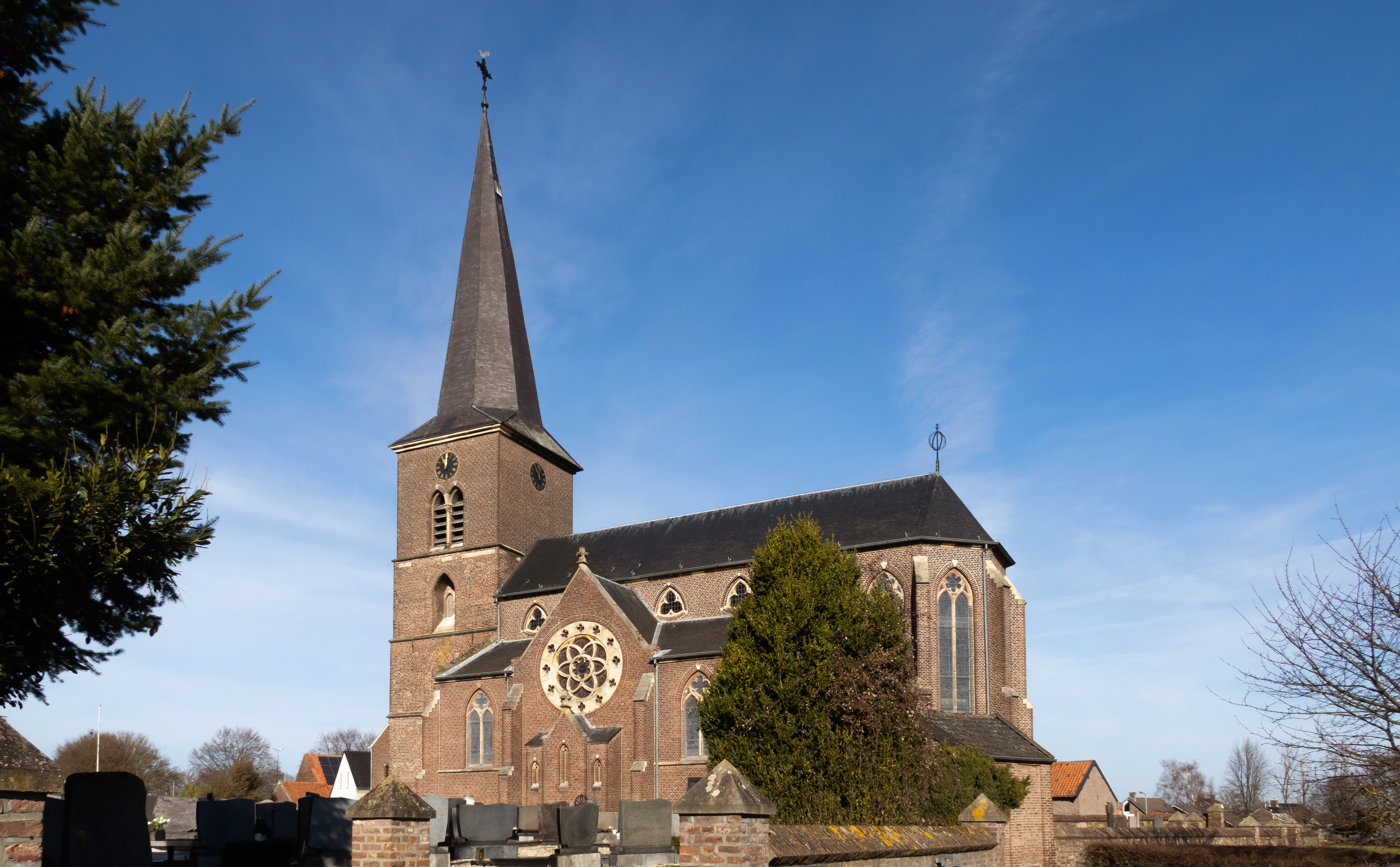
St Gertrudis Church

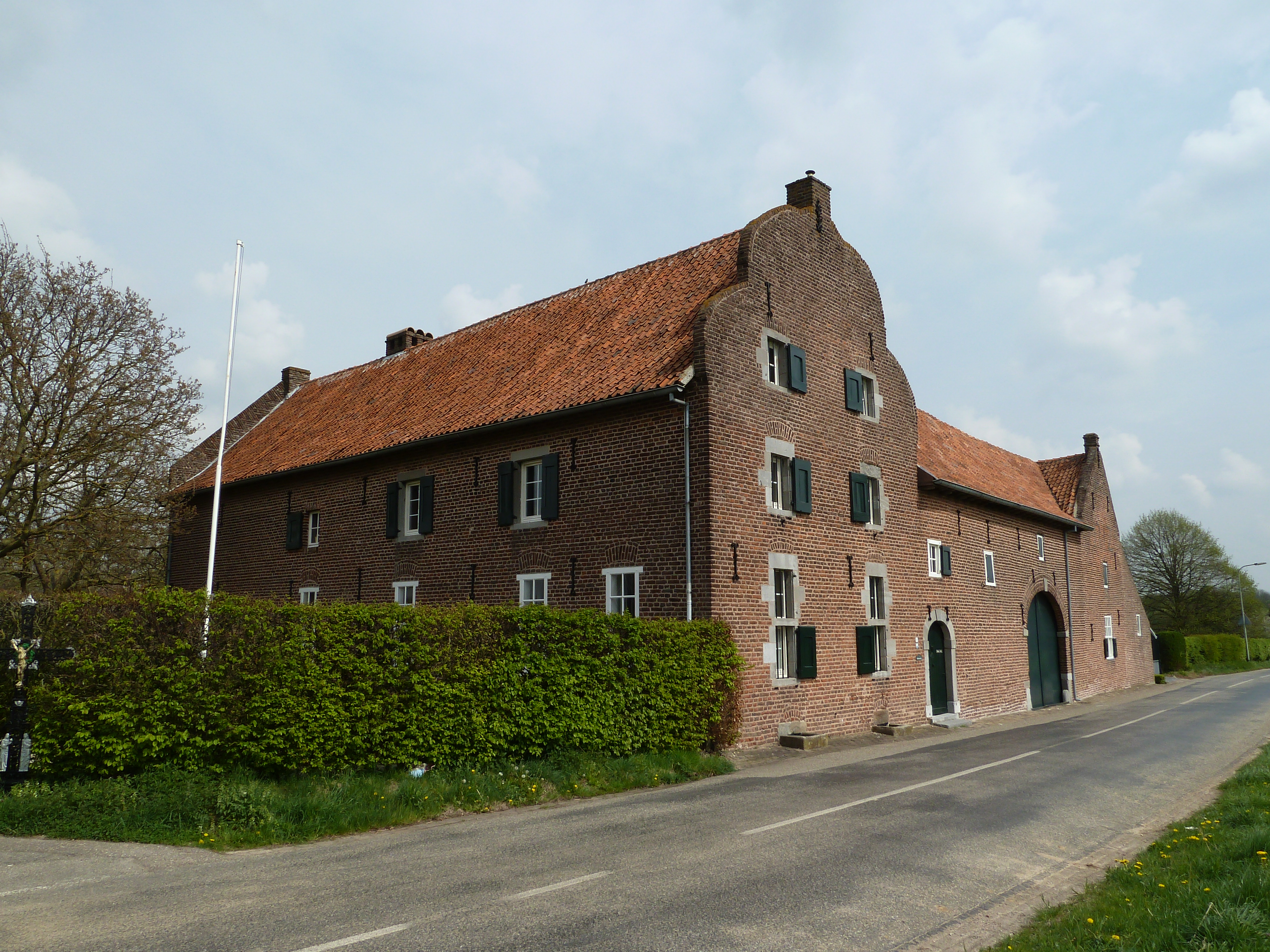
Etzenraderhof

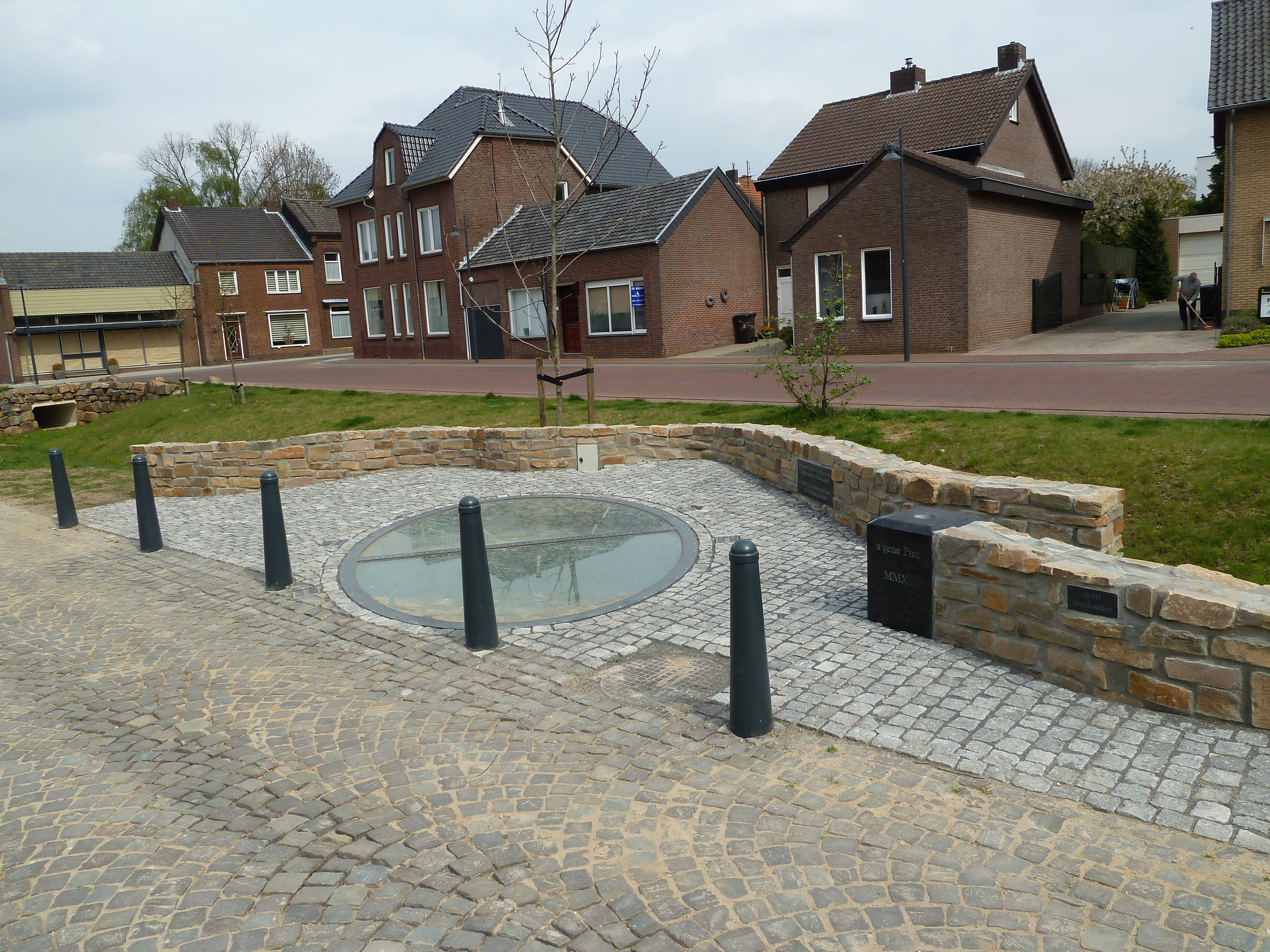
Water well
