= Sclessin =

- Quarter of Liège
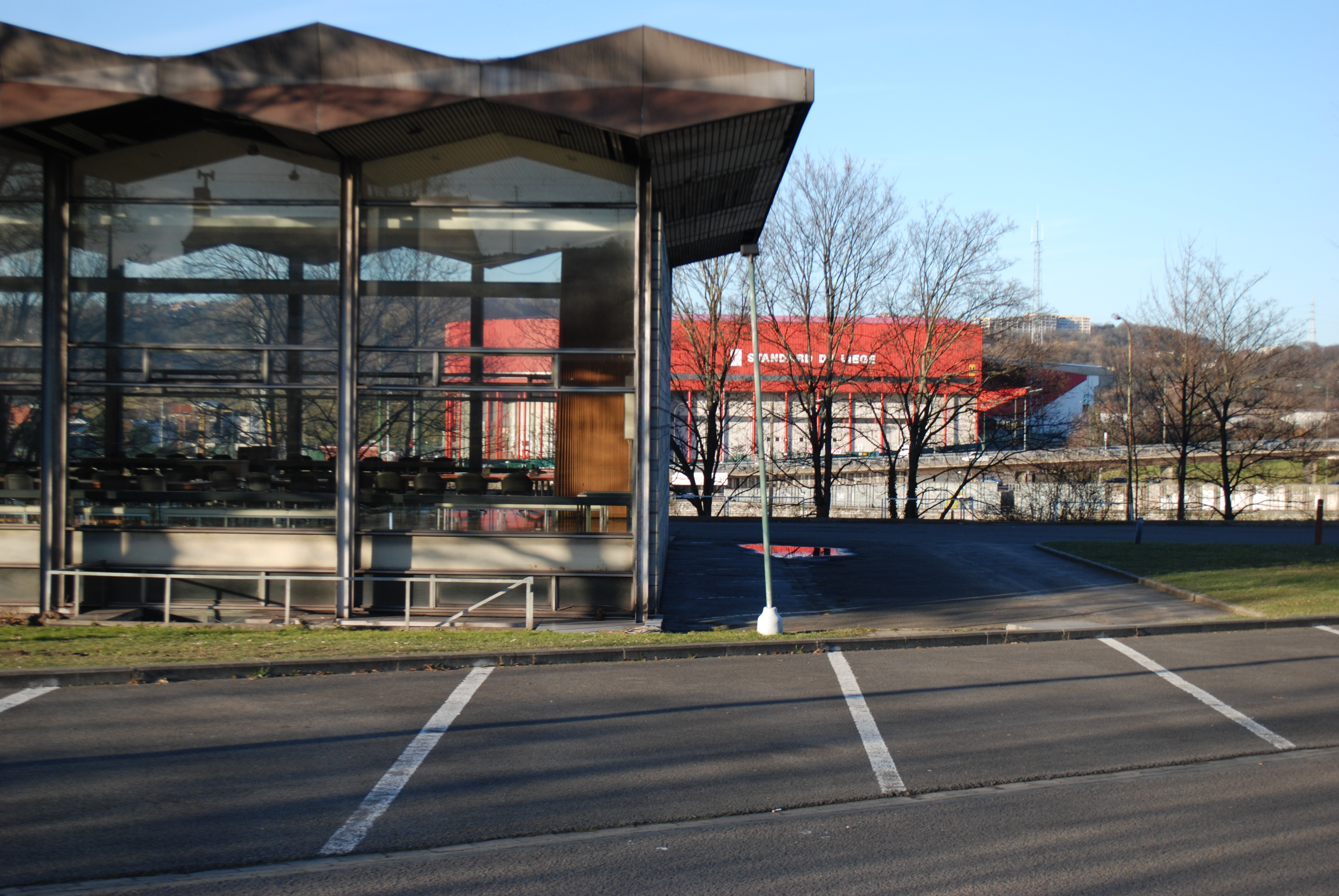
- Stade Maurice Dufrasne

- Location of Sclessin in Liège
- Interactive map of Sclessin
- Location within Belgium Location within Liège Province
- Coordinates: 50°36′35″N 5°32′25″E
- Country: Belgium
- Community: French Community
- Region: Wallonia
- Province: Liège
- Arrondissement: Liège
- Municipality: Liège
- Postal codes: 4000
- Area codes: 04

Sclessin (French pronunciation: [sklesɛ̃]) is a quarter of the city of Liège located in the province of Liège, Wallonia, Belgium. Before the fusion of the Belgian municipalities in 1977, it was a quarter of the municipality of Ougrée. On 1 January 1977, it was merged into Liège. Sclessin has never been a municipality, but in some sources, Sclessin is mentioned as a "section" (sub-municipality).
