= Heerlen railway station =

Railway station in Heerlen, Netherlands

Heerlen
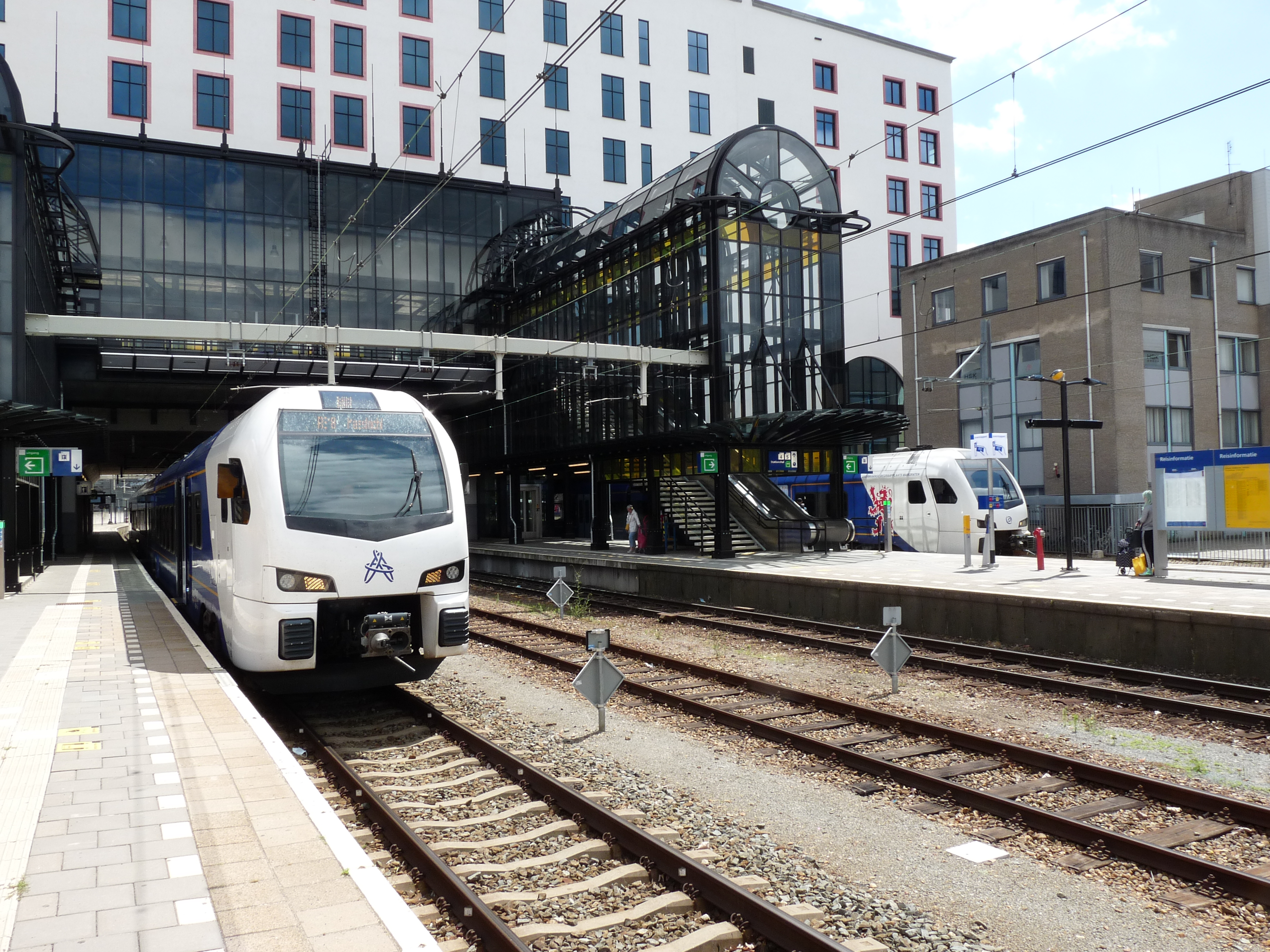

General information
- Location: Stationsplein 1, 6411 NE, Heerlen; Netherlands
- Coordinates: 50°53′27″N 5°58′29″E
- Operator: ProRail
- Lines: Sittard–Herzogenrath railway Heerlen–Schin op Geul railway
- Platforms: 5
- Tracks: 6
- Train operators: NS; Arriva
- Connections: Bus (Arriva)

Construction
- Parking: P+R available (2,53€/h, maximum 15,21€/d, 4,50€/d with traveller discount)
- Cycle facilities: OV-Fiets; Velocity; NS-fiets watched parking; All bicycle-related services are available to the right from the exit.
- Accessible: Lifts to tracks and ramps for boarding NS Intercity trains are available. All Arriva lines have level boarding.

Other information
- Station code: HRL
- Website: ns.nl/stationsinformatie/hrl/heerlen

History
- Opened: 1896
Services
| Preceding station | Nederlandse Spoorwegen | Following station |
|---|---|---|
| Sittard towards Enkhuizen | NS Intercity 3900 Mon-Thur until 19:30 | Terminus |
| Sittard towards Eindhoven Centraal | NS Intercity 3900 After 19:30 and Fri-Sun | Terminus |
| Preceding station | Arriva Netherlands | Following station |
| Valkenburg towards Maastricht Randwyck | Sneltrein 32100 | Terminus |
| Heerlen Woonboulevard towards Maastricht Randwyck | Stoptrein 32000 | Terminus |
| Hoensbroek towards Sittard | Stoptrein 32500 | Terminus |
| Valkenburg towards Liège-Guillemins | RE 18; LIMAX; Drielandentrein; Dreiländerzug; Train des trois pays | Landgraaf towards Aachen Hbf |
Location
- Location within Netherlands

Heerlen is a railway station located in Heerlen, Netherlands.

== History ==
The station was opened on 1 May 1896 and is located on the Sittard–Herzogenrath railway and the Heerlen–Schin op Geul railway. The station was an important mining station, until the mines closed down.

As part of the Maankwartier ("Moon Quarter") project, construction of an entirely new train station started in December 2012.

== Train services ==
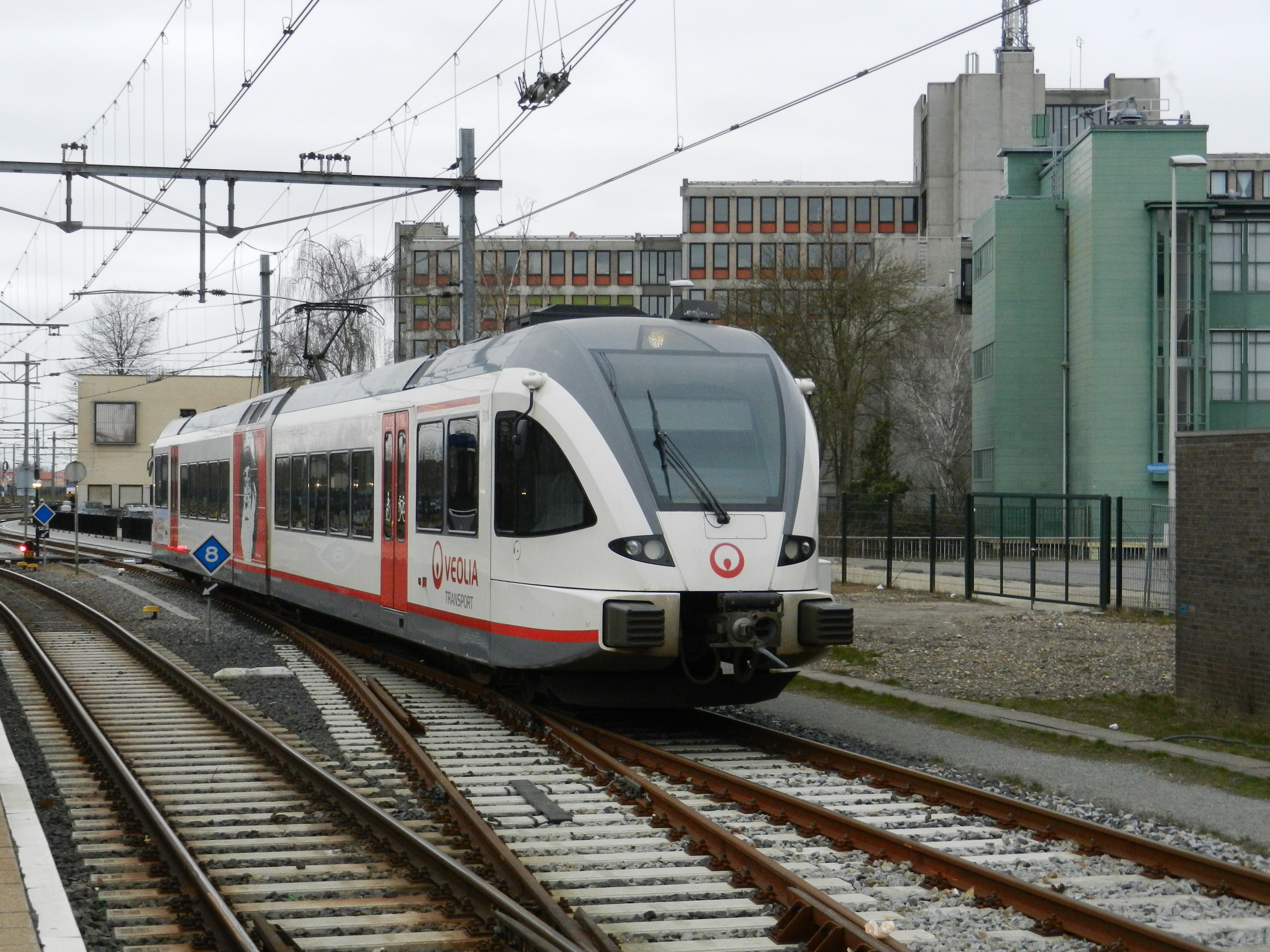
Veolia Stoptrein at Heerlen station, regional services have been taken over by Arriva as of 2016

As of June 2024, the following train services call at this station:

- Express:
  - Intercity IC 3900: Enkhuizen - Amsterdam – Utrecht – Eindhoven – Heerlen
  - Sneltrein RE 18 (Also known as the Three Countries Train): Aachen – Heerlen – Maastricht – Liège-Guillemins
- Local:
  - Stoptrein RS15: Sittard – Heerlen
  - Stoptrein RS18: Maastricht Randwyck – Heerlen – Kerkrade

== Bus services ==
The following bus lines serve the bus station north of the railway station: (services shown here no longer exist or have different line numbers)

- 20: Heerlen Station–Heerlen South–Kunrade–Voerendaal–Voerendaal Station–Retersbeek–Weustenrade–Brommelen–Swier–Wijnandsrade–Laar–Nuth–Vaesrade–Hoensbroek
- 21: Brunssum–Hoensbroek–Heerlen Station–Heerlen Hospital–Heerlen South–Kerkrade Stadion–Simpelveld–Eys–Gulpen
- 22: Heerlen Hospital–Heerlen Station–Landgraaf–Ubach
- 25: Hoensbroek–Heerlen North–Heerlen Station–Landgraaf–Kerkrade
- 26: Kerkrade Bus Station–Haanrade–Eygelshoven Markt–Eygelshoven Station–Landgraaf–Heerlen de Kissel Station–Heerlen Station–Hoensbroek
- 28: Kerkrade South–Kerkrade Station–Kerkrade Bus Station–GaiaPark (Zoo)–Kerkrade Stadion–Heerlen East–Heerlen Station–Heerlen North–Brunssum–Schinveld
- 29: Kerkrade South–Kerkrade Station–Kerkrade Bus Station–Eygelshoven Markt–Landgraaf–Heerlen Station–Heerlen Molenburg–Kerkrade Stadion
- 31: Heerlen Station–Beek (School Service)
- 33: Heerlen Station–Landgraaf–Ubach
- 36: Heerlen Station–Brunssum–Jabeek–Doenrade–Sittard Station
- 37: Heerlen Station–Brunssum–Merkelbeek–Doenrade–Sittard Station
- 40: Heerlen Station–Kunrade–Ubachsberg–Elkenrade–Wijlre–Gulpen
- 41: Kerkrade Bus Station–GaiaPark (Zoo)–Kerkrade Stadion–Heerlen South–Heerlen Station–Hoensbroek–Amstenrade–Oirsbeek–Doenrade–Sittard Station
- 42:
- 43: Heerlen Station–Kerkrade Stadion–Simpelveld–Bocholtz–Nijswiller–Lemiers–Vaals
- 44: Heerlen Station–Kerkrade Stadion–Horbach (Germany)–Richterich–Laurensberg–Aachen–Aachen Hauptbahnhof
- 52: Heerlen Station–Kunrade–Voerendaal–Klimmen–Hulsberg–Arensgenhout–Schimmert–Ulestraten–Meerssen Station
- 58: Heerlen Station–Nijswiller–Wittem–Gulpen
