= Liège–Maastricht railway =

Railway line between Netherlands and Belgium

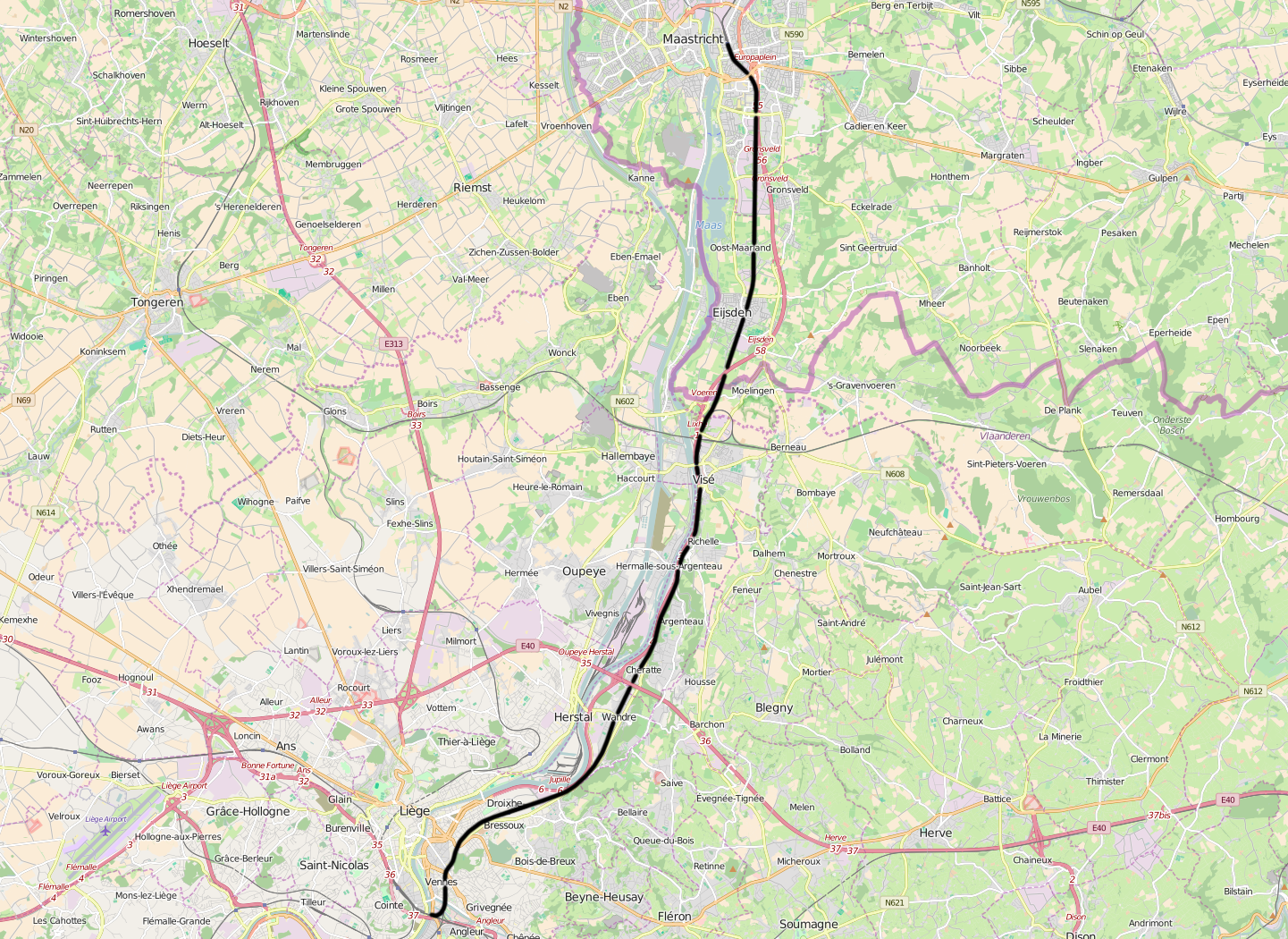
- Liège-Maastricht railway connection

Overview
- Status: Operational
- Locale: The Netherlands and Belgium
- Termini: Liège-Guillemins railway station; Maastricht railway station

Service
- Operator(s): National Railway Company of Belgium

History
- Opened: 1861

Technical
- Line length: 29 km (18 mi)
- Number of tracks: double track
- Track gauge: 1,435 mm (4 ft 8 1/2 in) standard gauge
- Electrification: Liège–Gronsveld: 3 kV DC; Gronsveld–Maastricht: 1,5 kV DC

The Liège–Maastricht railway (line 40 in the Belgian numbering plan) is a railway line running from Liège in Belgium to Maastricht in the Netherlands. The line was opened in 1861.

The line runs from the Dutch province of Limburg to the Belgian province of Liège. For a very small part, it runs through the Belgian province of Limburg (near the village of Moelingen).

== Stations ==
The main interchange stations on the Liège–Maastricht railway are:

- Liège: to Brussels, Aachen, Namur, Luxembourg and Hasselt
- Maastricht: to Heerlen, Roermond, Eindhoven, Amsterdam

Local stations are in Bressoux and Visé, Belgium, and in Eijsden and Randwyck on the Dutch side.

== Electrification ==
The line has overhead power at 1,500 V DC in the Netherlands and 3,000 V DC in Belgium; the break of voltage occurs just to the North of the frontier, on Dutch territory.

== See also ==
- Line 40 (Infrabel) (in French)
