= Maastricht Randwyck railway station =

Railway station in the Netherlands

Maastricht Randwyck
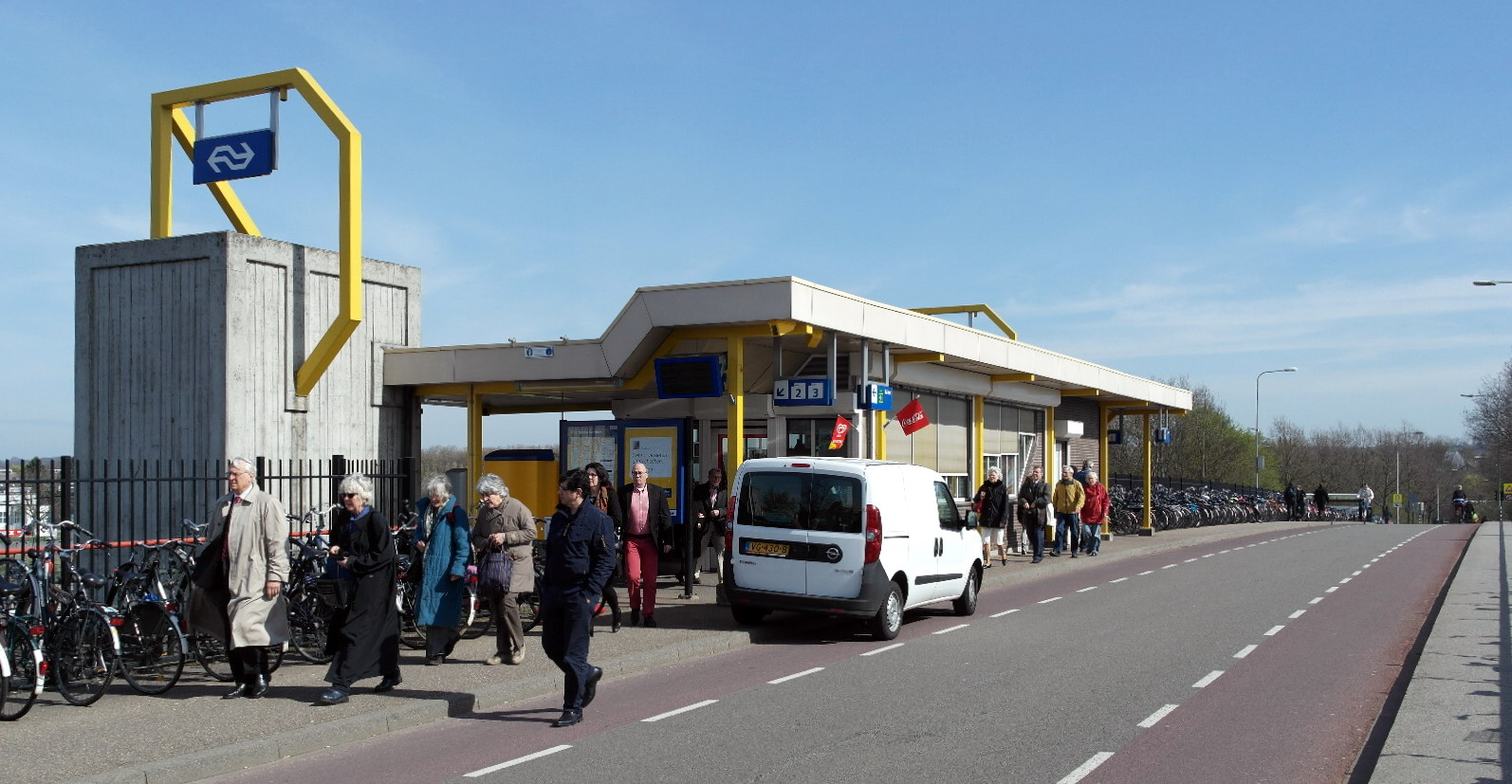

General information
- Location: Maastricht; Netherlands
- Coordinates: 50°50′16″N 5°43′03″E
- Line: Liège–Maastricht railway
- Tracks: 3

Other information
- Station code: Mtr

History
- Opened: 31 May 1987

Services
Preceding station	Arriva Netherlands	Following station
Terminus	Sneltrein 32100	Maastricht towards Heerlen
Terminus	Stoptrein 32000	Maastricht towards Heerlen
Terminus	Stoptrein 32400	Maastricht towards Roermond
Eijsden towards Liège-Guillemins	RE 18; LIMAX; Drielandentrein; Dreiländerzug; Train des trois pays	Maastricht towards Aachen Hbf
Location
- Location within Netherlands

Maastricht Randwyck railway station is located in the suburb Randwyck in Maastricht, Netherlands. The railway station is located near the MECC Conference Centre, Academic Hospital Maastricht, and Maastricht University’s Randwyck Campus.

== History ==
The station opened on 31 May 1987 on the Liège–Maastricht railway. Between December 2006 and December 2011 Randwyck was the southernmost active railway station in the Netherlands, as the more southern Eijsden station was closed during this time.

== Station layout ==
The station has three platforms, divided over a side platform (1) and an island platform (2 and 3).

== Train services ==
The following train services call at this station:

- Express services:
  - Arriva sneltrein S5: Maastricht Randwyck–Heerlen
  - NMBS regional S43: Liège–Visè–Maastricht
- Local services:
  - Arriva stoptrein S2: Roermond–Sittard–Maastricht Randwyck
  - Arriva stoptrein S4: Maastricht Randwyck–Heerlen
