= Railway stations in the Netherlands =

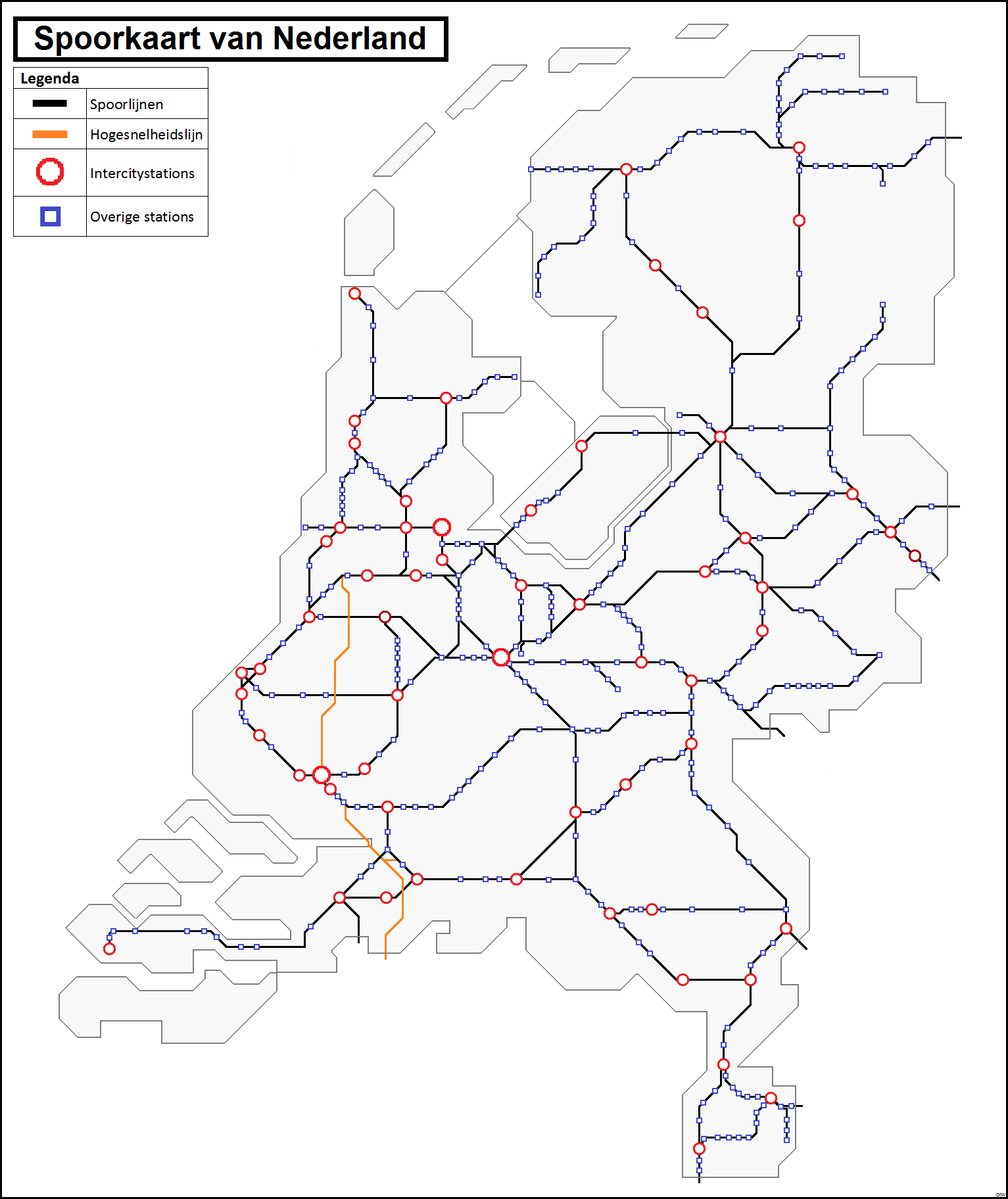
Railway network in the Netherlands, 2017

There are currently 401 railway stations in the Netherlands including three next to football stadiums (Amsterdam Arena railway station, Eindhoven Stadion railway station, Rotterdam Stadion railway station), which are used only during special events and one, Utrecht Maliebaan railway station which provides a service into the exhibition area of the National Railway Museum during its opening hours. Before being discontinued Heerenveen IJsstadion railway station serviced the ice arena Thialf in case of events. NS Stations is the body which manages and owns all stations in the Netherlands.

== Categories ==
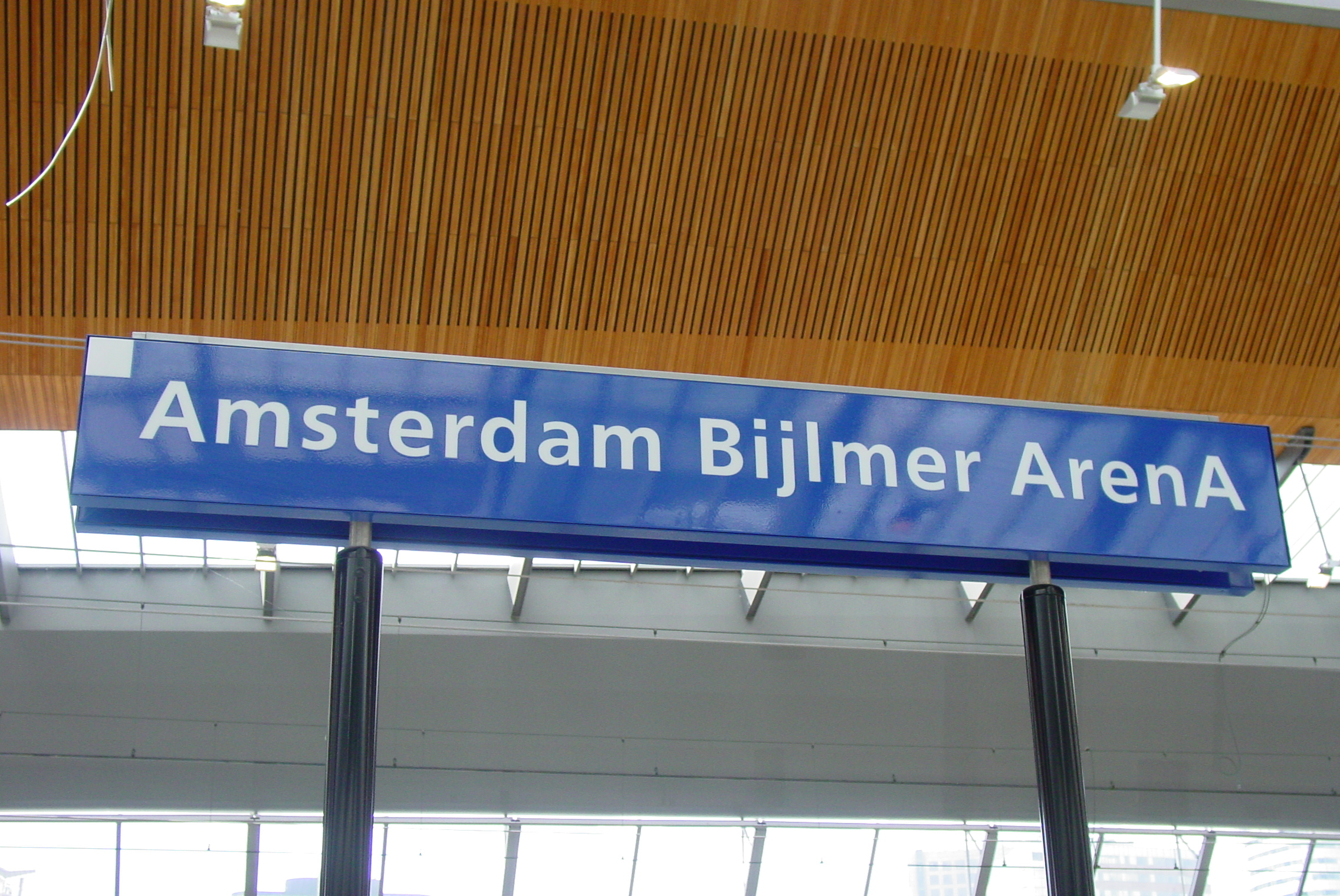
This image at Amsterdam Bijlmer ArenA shows the standard style of station name board: white on blue, with a white square in the upper-left corner.

Stations are divided into two categories based upon the service they receive. These are, in order of decreasing importance:

- Intercity stations, where usually all trains (except, in some cases, international services) call.
- The remaining stations, where only local trains (Sprinters) call.

There are exceptions to this categorization. Some local trains – despite being called stoptreinen – do not stop at all stations: two examples are the services from Groningen to Roodeschool and from Tiel to Arnhem.

On the route diagrams printed at the top of station departure sheets, intercity stations are indicated by the letters IC.

ProRail classifies stations into five categories based upon the facilities available. The categories are (in English): Cathedral, Mega, Plus, Basic and Stop.

== Naming conventions ==
Stations are generally named after the town they serve. In cases where a town is served by more than one station, additional designations specify the station's status or location, for example:

- Centraal (abbreviated "CS"): "Central" – a town's most important station with more than 40,000 daily passengers.
- Centrum: "Centre" – a centrally located station, and/or a town's most important station with, however, fewer than 40,000 daily passengers.
- Zuid: "South"
- Noord: "North"
- Oost: "East"
- West: "West"
- A specific locality within the town, e.g. Amsterdam Sloterdijk railway station sometimes associated with a nearby institution e.g. Tilburg Universiteit railway station.

In the situation, where a station serves two communities, both community names are given, separated by a hyphen, e.g. Krommenie-Assendelft.

As of 15 December 2019 eight stations are designated Centraal. They are: Amsterdam Centraal, Amersfoort Centraal, Arnhem Centraal, Den Haag Centraal, Eindhoven Centraal, Leiden Centraal, Rotterdam Centraal, and Utrecht Centraal.

== List of stations, with their official abbreviations ==
Station	Code	Opened	Closed	Reopened	Passengers
Aalten	Atn	1885			
Abcoude	Ac	1843			1579
Akkrum	Akm	1868			749
Alkmaar Noord	Amrn	1980			4836
Alkmaar	Amr	1865			18930
Almelo de Riet	Amri	1926			1241
Almelo	Aml	1865			10618
Almere Buiten	Almb	1987			6458
Almere Centrum	Alm	1987			23784
Almere Muziekwijk	Almm	1987			6681
Almere Oostvaarders	Almo	2004			4630
Almere Parkwijk	Almp	1996			3584
Almere Poort	Ampo	2012			3085
Alphen aan den Rijn	Apn	1878			9725
Amersfoort Centraal	Amf	1863			39675
Amersfoort Schothorst	Amfs	1987			5762
Amersfoort Vathorst	Avat	2006			2583
Amsterdam Amstel	Asa	1939			28976
Amsterdam Arena	Asdar	1996			
Amsterdam Bijlmer ArenA	Asb	1971			22684
Amsterdam Centraal	Asd	1889			167427
Amsterdam Holendrecht	Ashd	2008			3227
Amsterdam Lelylaan	Asdl	1986			14042
Amsterdam Muiderpoort	Asdm	1896			11888
Amsterdam RAI	Rai	1981			6808
Amsterdam Science Park	Assp	2009			4117
Amsterdam Sloterdijk	Ass	1956		1986	47615
Amsterdam Zuid	Asdz	1978			43716
Anna Paulowna	Ana	1865			2137
Apeldoorn De Maten	Apdm	2006			
Apeldoorn Osseveld	Apdo	2006			1110
Apeldoorn	Apd	1876			14628
Appingedam	Apg	1884			
Arkel	Akl	1883	1938	1940	
Arnemuiden	Arn	1872			461
Arnhem Presikhaaf	Ahpr	1969			2829
Arnhem Centraal	Ah	1845			39164
Arnhem Velperpoort	Ahp	1893			2066
Arnhem Zuid	Ahz	2005			2909
Assen	Asn	1870			9136
Baarn	Brn	1874			4413
Bad Nieuweschans	Nsch	1868			
Baflo	Bf	1893			
Barendrecht	Brd	1872		2001	5226
Barneveld Centrum	Bnc	1902			
Barneveld Noord	Bnn	1938	1944	1951	
Barneveld Zuid	Bnz	2015			
Bedum	Bdm	1884			
Beek-Elsloo	Bk	1862			2028
Beesd	Bsd	1883			
Beilen	Bl	1870			2124
Bergen op Zoom	Bgn	1863			6939
Best	Bet	1866	1938	1940	5263
Beverwijk	Bv	1867			5572
Bilthoven	Bhv	1863			4771
Blerick	Br	1868			1131
Bloemendaal	Bll	1900			1192
Bodegraven	Bdg	1878			2924
Borne	Bn	1865			2272
Boskoop	Bsk	1934			1377
Boskoop Snijdelwijk	Bsks	2017			
Bovenkarspel Flora	Bkf	1977			759
Bovenkarspel-Grootebroek	Bkg	1885			2301
Boven Hardinxveld	Bhdv	2012			
Boxmeer	Bmr	1883			
Boxtel	Btl	1865			5917
Breda Prinsenbeek	Bdpb	1988			1589
Breda	Bd	1855			30554
Breukelen	Bkl	1843			4997
Brummen	Bmn	1865			1025
Buitenpost	Bp	1866			
Bunde	Bde	1862			872
Bunnik	Bnk	1868	1938	1972	2131
Bussum Zuid	Bsmz	1966			3893
Capelle Schollevaar	Cps	1981			2311
Castricum	Cas	1867			7024
Chevremont	Cvm	1949			
Coevorden	Co	1905			
Cuijk	Ck	1883			
Culemborg	Cl	1868			8144
Daarlerveen	Da	1906			
Dalen	Dln	1905	1950	1987	
Dalfsen	Dl	1903			
De Vink	Dvnk	1906	1928	1985	3146
De Westereen	Dwe	1885			
Deinum	Dei	1863			
Delden	Ddn	1865			
Delft	Dt	1847			31630
Delft Campus	Dtz	1970			4688
Delfzijl	Dz	1884			
Delfzijl West	Dzw	1969			
Den Dolder	Dld	1895			1817
Den Haag Centraal	Gvc	1973			77783
Den Haag Hollands Spoor	Gv	1843			34946
Den Haag Laan van NOI	Laa	1907			14516
Den Haag Mariahoeve	Gvm	1966			3178
Den Haag Moerwijk	Gvmw	1996			2603
Den Haag Ypenburg	Ypb	2005			2233
Den Helder	Hdr	1865			3946
Den Helder Zuid	Hdrz	1980			2082
Deurne	Dn	1864			4333
Deventer Colmschate	Dvc	1888	1933	1989	1464
Deventer	Dv	1865			19739
Didam	Did	1885			
Diemen	Dmn	1882	1929	1974	2996
Diemen Zuid	Dmnz	1993			3551
Dieren	Dr	1865			3641
Doetinchem De Huet	Dtch	1985			
Doetinchem	Dtc	1856			
Dordrecht	Ddr	1872			23172
Dordrecht Stadspolders	Ddrs	1990			
Dordrecht Zuid	Ddzd	1973			1336
Driebergen-Zeist	Db	1844			9235
Driehuis	Dh	1957			903
Dronryp	Drp	1863			
Dronten	Dron	2012			3428
Duiven	Dvn	1856	1936	1980	
Duivendrecht	Dvd	1993			14383
Echt	Ec	1862			2263
Ede Centrum	Edc	1902	1944	1951	
Ede-Wageningen	Ed	1845			17599
Eemshaven	Eem	2018			
Eijsden	Edn	1861	2006	2011	162
Eindhoven Centraal	Ehv	1864			60450
Eindhoven Stadion	Ehs	1990			
Eindhoven Strijp-S	Ehb	1971			
Elst	Est	1879			3710
Emmen	Emn	1905			
Emmen Zuid	Emnz	2011			
Enkhuizen	Ekz	1885			2393
Enschede De Eschmarke	Ese	2001			
Enschede Kennispark	Esk	1996			
Enschede	Es	1866			18508
Ermelo	Eml	1863			2849
Etten-Leur	Etn	1854			3241
Eygelshoven Markt	Eghm	2007			
Eygelshoven	Egh	1949			
Feanwâlden	Fwd	1866			
Franeker	Fn	1863			
Gaanderen	Gdr	2006			
Geldermalsen	Gdm	1868			5909
Geldrop	Gp	1913			1509
Geleen Oost	Gln	1896			627
Geleen-Lutterade	Lut	1862			1357
Gilze-Rijen	Gz	1863			2529
Glanerbrug	Gbr	1868	1950	2001	
Goes	Gs	1868			7160
Goor	Go	1865			
Gorinchem	Gr	1883			
Gouda Goverwelle	Gdg	1993			2998
Gouda	Gd	1855			21298
Gramsbergen	Gbg	1905			
Grijpskerk	Gk	1866			
Groningen Europapark	Gerp	2007			1212
Groningen Noord	Gnn	1884			
Groningen	Gn	1866			19706
Grou-Jirnsum	Gw	1868			947
Haarlem	Hlm	1839			37399
Haarlem Spaarnwoude	Hlms	1998			3420
Halfweg-Zwanenburg	Hwzb	2012			2118
Hardenberg	Hdb	1905			
Harderwijk	Hd	1863			5629
Hardinxveld Blauwe Zoom	Bzm	2011			
Hardinxveld-Giessendam	Gnd	1885			
Haren (NL)	Hrn	1870	1936	1968	1190
Harlingen Haven	Hlgh	1863			
Harlingen	Hlg	1863			
Heemskerk	Hk	1969			2135
Heemstede-Aerdenhout	Had	1891			6396
Heerenveen IJsstadion (defunct 2015)	Hry	1975			
Heerenveen	Hr	1868			5893
Heerhugowaard	Hwd	1865			7352
Heerlen	Hrl	1896			7491
Heerlen Woonboulevard	Hrlw	2010			
Heeze	Hz	1913		1977	1568
Heiloo	Hlo	1867			4676
Heino	Hno	1881			693
Helmond Brandevoort	Hmbv	2006			1057
Helmond Brouwhuis	Hmbh	1987			1767
Helmond	Hm	1864			6807
Helmond 't Hout	Hmh	1992			1137
Hemmen-Dodewaard	Hmn	1882			
Hengelo Gezondheidspark	Hglg	2012			
Hengelo Oost	Hglo	1975			
Hengelo	Hgl	1865			13437
Hillegom	Hil	1898	1944	2000	2401
Hilversum Media Park	Hvsn	1974			3853
Hilversum	Hvs	1874			24105
Hilversum Sportpark	Hvsp	1874			7125
Hindeloopen	Hnp	1885			
Hoensbroek	Hb	1896			202
Hoevelaken	Hvl	2012			
Hollandsche Rading	Hor	1874			865
Holten	Hon	1886			1278
Hoofddorp	Hfd	1981			15258
Hoogeveen	Hgv	1870			4472
Hoogezand-Sappemeer	Hgz	1868			
Hoogkarspel	Hks	1885			2300
Hoorn Kersenboogerd	Hnk	1986			5149
Hoorn	Hn	1884			13527
Horst-Sevenum	Hrt	1866			2675
Houten Castellum	Htnc	2001	2008	2010	3936
Houten	Htn	1868	1935	1982	7436
Houthem-Sint Gerlach	Sgl	1890			
Hurdegaryp	Hdg	1866			
IJlst	IJt	1885	1938	1985	
Kampen	Kpn	1865			4136
Kampen Zuid	Kpnz	2012			1506
Kapelle-Biezelinge	Bzl	1868			1125
Kerkrade Centrum	Krd	1949			
Kesteren	Ktr	1882			
Klarenbeek	Kbk	1882			
Klimmen-Ransdaal	Kmr	1915			
Koog aan de Zaan	Kbw	1869			2898
Koudum-Molkwerum	Kmw	1885	1938	1940	
Krabbendijke	Kbd	1868			571
Krommenie-Assendelft	Kma	1869		2008	5262
Kropswolde	Kw	1868			
Kruiningen-Yerseke	Krg	1868			802
Lage Zwaluwe	Zlw	1883			883
Landgraaf	Lg	1896			
Lansingerland-Zoetermeer	Llzm	2018			
Leerdam	Ldm	1883			
Leeuwarden Camminghaburen	Lwc	1991			
Leeuwarden	Lw	1863			9682
Leiden Centraal	Ledn	1842			71100
Leiden Lammenschans	Ldl	1961			3886
Lelystad Centrum	Lls	1988			13369
Lichtenvoorde-Groenlo	Ltv	1878			
Lochem	Lc	1865			
Loppersum	Lp	1884			
Lunteren	Ltn	1902	1944	1951	
Maarheeze	Mz	2010			1333
Maarn	Mrn	1845		1972	1493
Maarssen	Mas	1843			4524
Maastricht Noord	Mtn	2013			
Maastricht	Mt	1853			15633
Maastricht Randwyck	Mtr	1987			1776
Mantgum	Mg	1883	1938	1973	
Mariënberg	Mrb	1905			
Martenshoek	Mth	1868			
Meerssen	Mes	1853			
Meppel	Mp	1867			5638
Middelburg	Mdb	1872			4549
Mook-Molenhoek	Mmlh	2009			
Naarden-Bussum	Ndb	1874			9148
Nieuw Amsterdam	Na	1905			
Nieuwerkerk aan den IJssel	Nwk	1909	1935	1971	3370
Nieuw-Vennep	Nvp	1981			2756
Nijkerk	Nkk	1863			3338
Nijmegen Dukenburg	Nmd	1973			1845
Nijmegen Goffert	Nmgo	2014			
Nijmegen Heyendaal	Nmh	1972			
Nijmegen Lent	Nml	1882	1934	2002	1108
Nijmegen	Nm	1865			43195
Nijverdal	Nvd	1881			2958
Nunspeet	Ns	1863			2762
Nuth	Nh	1896			481
Obdam	Obd	1898			1430
Oisterwijk	Ot	1865			2311
Oldenzaal	Odz	1865			
Olst	Ost	1866	1936	1940	1187
Ommen	Omn	1903			
Oosterbeek	Otb	1845			511
Opheusden	Op	1880	1890	1898	
Oss	O	1881			8078
Oss West	Ow	1981			1833
Oudenbosch	Odb	1854			1254
Overveen	Ovn	1881			2637
Purmerend Overwhere	Pmo	1971			2058
Purmerend	Pmr	1884			2401
Purmerend Weidevenne	Pmw	2007			1588
Putten	Pt	1863			1813
Raalte	Rat	1881			2117
Ravenstein	Rvs	1881			1413
Reuver	Rv	1862			
Rheden	Rh	1882			805
Rhenen	Rhn	1886	1944	1981	1394
Rijssen	Rsn	1888			2398
Rijswijk	Rsw	1965			7735
Rilland-Bath	Rb	1872			445
Roermond	Rm	1865			13274
Roodeschool	Rd	1893		2018	
Roosendaal	Rsd	1854			10399
Rosmalen	Rs	1881	1938	1981	2364
Rotterdam Alexander	Rta	1968			16756
Rotterdam Blaak	Rtb	1877			23368
Rotterdam Centraal	Rtd	1847			85246
Rotterdam Lombardijen	Rlb	1964			6206
Rotterdam Noord	Rtn	1953			2254
Rotterdam Stadion	Rtst	1937			
Rotterdam Zuid	Rtz	1877			3031
Ruurlo	Rl	1878			
Santpoort Noord	Sptn	1957			797
Santpoort Zuid	Sptz	1867			803
Sassenheim	Ssh	2011			3479
Sauwerd	Swd	1884			
Schagen	Sgn	1865			5326
Scheemda	Sda	1868			
Schiedam Centrum	Sdm	1847			18630
Schin op Geul	Sog	1853			
Schinnen	Sn	1896			246
Schiphol	Shl	1978			71585
's-Hertogenbosch Oost	Hto	1987			1616
's-Hertogenbosch	Ht	1868			43172
Sittard	Std	1862			12110
Sliedrecht Baanhoek	Sdtb	1885	1938	2011	
Sliedrecht	Sdt	1885			
Sneek Noord	Sknd	1973			
Sneek	Sk	1883			
Soest (Netherlands)	St	1898			211
Soest Zuid	Stz	1898			2014
Soestdijk	Sd	1898			764
Spaubeek	Sbk	1896			261
Stavoren	Stv	1885			
Stedum	Stm	1884			
Steenwijk	Swk	1868			3232
Susteren	Srn	1862			918
Swalmen	Sm	1862			
't Harde	Hde	1863			1306
Tegelen	Tg	1865			
Terborg	Tbg	1885			
Tiel Passewaaij	Tpsw	2007			1434
Tiel	Tl	1882			3445
Tilburg	Tb	1863			32158
Tilburg Reeshof	Tbr	2003			2556
Tilburg Universiteit	Tbu	1969			6929
Twello	Twl	1887	1951	2006	1433
Uitgeest	Utg	1867			5167
Uithuizen	Uhz	1893			
Uithuizermeeden	Uhm	1893			
Usquert	Ust	1893			
Utrecht Centraal	Ut	1843			176552
Utrecht Leidsche Rijn	Utlr	2013			784
Utrecht Lunetten	Utl	1874	1932	1980	2885
Utrecht Maliebaan	Utm	1874	1939	2005	
Utrecht Overvecht	Uto	1968			8217
Utrecht Terwijde	Utt	2003			3285
Utrecht Vaartsche Rijn	Utvr	2016			
Utrecht Zuilen	Utzl	2007			2003
Valkenburg	Vk	1853			
Varsseveld	Vsv	1885			
Veendam	Vdm	1910	1953	2011	
Veenendaal Centrum	Vndc	1886	1944	1981	2239
Veenendaal West	Vndw	1981			1619
Veenendaal-De Klomp	Klp	1845			4007
Velp	Vp	1865			1416
Venlo	Vl	1865			4370
Venray	Vry	1883			
Vierlingsbeek	Vlb	1882			
Vleuten	Vtn	1881			3717
Vlissingen	Vs	1873			2955
Vlissingen Souburg	Vss	1986			975
Voerendaal	Vdl	1915			
Voorburg	Vb	1870			2302
Voorhout	Vh	1892	1944	1997	3310
Voorschoten	Vst	1843	1944	1969	3074
Voorst-Empe	Vem	1876	1938	2006	
Vorden	Vd	1878			
Vriezenveen	Vz	1906			
Vroomshoop	Vhp	1906			
Vught	Vg	1868	1938	1940	1976
Waddinxveen Noord	Wadn	1973			883
Waddinxveen	Wad	1934			1613
Waddinxveen Triangel	Wadt	2018			
Warffum	Wfm	1893			
Weert	Wt	1879			7694
Weesp	Wp	1874			9052
Wehl	Wl	1885			
Westervoort	Wtv	1856	1936	2011	
Wezep	Wz	1863			1048
Wierden	Wdn	1881			1775
Wijchen	Wc	1881			4100
Wijhe	Wh	1866	1936	1940	1125
Winschoten	Ws	1868			
Winsum	Wsm	1893			
Winterswijk	Ww	1878			
Winterswijk West	Www	2001			
Woerden	Wd	1855			11948
Wolfheze	Wf	1845			527
Wolvega	Wv	1868			1639
Workum	Wk	1885			
Wormerveer	Wm	1869			3804
Zaandam Kogerveld	Zdk	1989			1445
Zaandam	Zd	1869			20790
Zaandijk Zaanse Schans	Kzd	1869			3020
Zaltbommel	Zbm	1869			3445
Zandvoort aan Zee	Zvt	1881			4770
Zetten-Andelst	Za	1882			
Zevenaar	Zv	1856			
Zevenbergen	Zvb	1854			1243
Zoetermeer Oost	Ztmo	1870	1938	1965	3345
Zoetermeer	Ztm	1973			5292
Zuidbroek	Zb	1868			
Zuidhorn	Zh	1866			
Zutphen	Zp	1865			11732
Zwijndrecht	Zwd	1872			5491
Zwolle	Zl	1864			41618
Zwolle Stadshagen	Zlsh	2019			

== Platforms and tracks ==
Not the platforms, but the tracks are numbered. In Dutch communication, NS refers to "spoor 1" ("track 1"), etc. while in English communication, NS refers to "platform 1" where "track 1" is meant (hence all island platforms have two numbers). Tracks without platform access, used for through traffic, also have a number. This number is not indicated, but it shows indirectly in cases when in the numbering of the accessible tracks a number is skipped. Track numbers are usually increasing in the direction away from the centre of the city and hence away from the main entrance(s) of the station.

A track along a long platform may have an "a" and a "b"-side, and sometimes three sections "a", "b" and "c".

At many stations, above platforms and at their access points, there are dynamic displays (electronic displays) of the destination and departure time of the next train.

== Machines and counters for train tickets ==
For checking in and out with an OV-chipkaart card readers are at station entrances, halls and/or platforms. It can be recharged (increasing the credit by paying an amount) at ticket machines. The anonymous variety of the card can also be purchased here. For some minor rail operators all this does not apply yet.

Paper tickets are available from the same ticket machines; at the counter (if available) a supplement of €0.50 per ticket (with a maximum of €1 per occasion) has to be paid. In both cases one can choose a dated or undated ticket; the latter can be useful if one has not decided yet about the travel date. If the ticket is not dated it requires a stamp from a stamp machine on the travel date.

With an e-ticket bought in advance for a specific journey one can just get on the train without any further validation of the ticket.

== NS Stations ==
NS Stations is a Dutch company that manages and operates all railway stations in the Netherlands.

== Safety and comfort ==
Passenger comfort sometimes suffers from (homeless) beggars or pickpockets, especially in large cities. Measures taken to remedy this include installation of CCTV, locking waiting rooms in the evening, and sometimes removal of benches from station halls. Also, a valid train ticket is required to access platforms, at many stations enforced by gates that require an OV-chipkaart to activate them. Passengers with large luggage should note that no luggage trolleys are provided (except at the station of Schiphol airport), although platforms are accessible by elevator.

== Station abbreviations ==
The official abbreviations of names of stations are used internally by the NS, but also on handwritten tickets; they can also conveniently be used when entering a station in the NS planner and are needed in some URLs, see below. In a station it can be found in the lower right corner of the yellow departure schedules. In most URLs (see below) they have to be written in lowercase, in some a capital is optional. On the departure schedules they are written in lowercase. In other cases the abbreviations are written with a capital letter.

Stations also have a four-digit code that is used on the keypad of older ticket machines to specify a destination.

== History ==
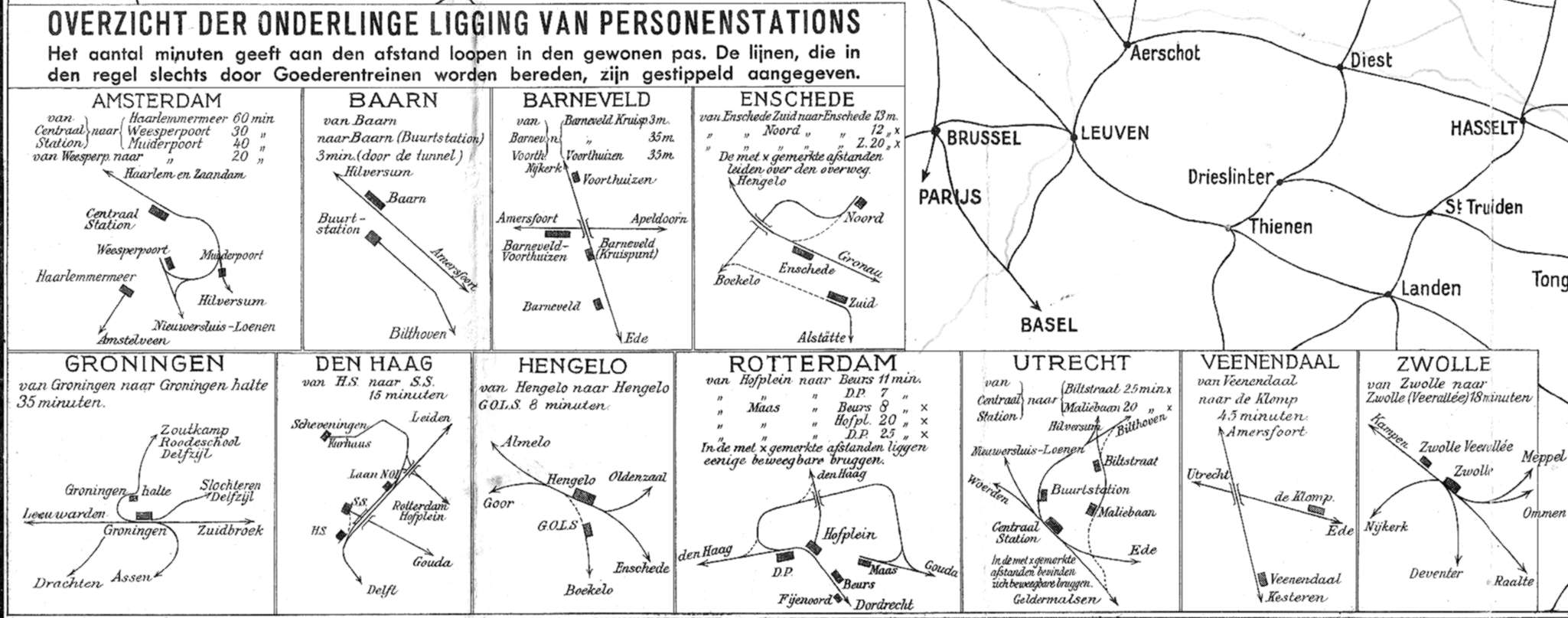
Positions of multiple stations in one city, 1936

== See also ==
- Amsterdam Metro
- List of Rotterdam metro stations
- List of busiest railway stations in the Netherlands
- Train routes in the Netherlands
- Trains in the Netherlands
- Transport in the Netherlands
