= Reuver railway station =

Railway station in the Netherlands

Reuver
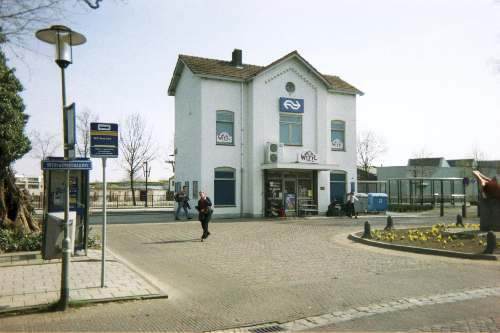

General information
- Location: Netherlands
- Coordinates: 51°16′59″N 6°04′46″E
- Line: Maastricht–Venlo railway

History
- Opened: 1862

Services
Preceding station	Arriva Netherlands	Following station
Tegelen towards Nijmegen	Stoptrein 32200	Swalmen towards Roermond
Location
- Location within Netherlands

Reuver is a railway station located in Reuver, Netherlands. The station originally opened in 1862 and is located on the Maastricht–Venlo railway on the section between Venlo and Roermond. Train services are operated by Arriva.

== Train services ==
The following local train services call at this station:

- Stoptrein: Nijmegen–Venlo–Roermond

== Bus services ==
Bus line 66, operated by Arriva Netherlands, connects the towns of Venlo, Tegelen, Belfeld, Reuver, Swalmen, and Roermond. It provides regular regional service along the east Limburg corridor.
