= Echt =

Echt may refer to:

- Echt, Aberdeenshire, a village in Scotland
- Echt-Susteren, a municipality in the Netherlands
  - Echt, Netherlands, a city in the municipality
    - Echt railway station
- Echt (band), a 1997–2002 German pop group
- Echt (Martian crater)
