= Bunde railway station =

Railway station in the Netherlands

Bunde
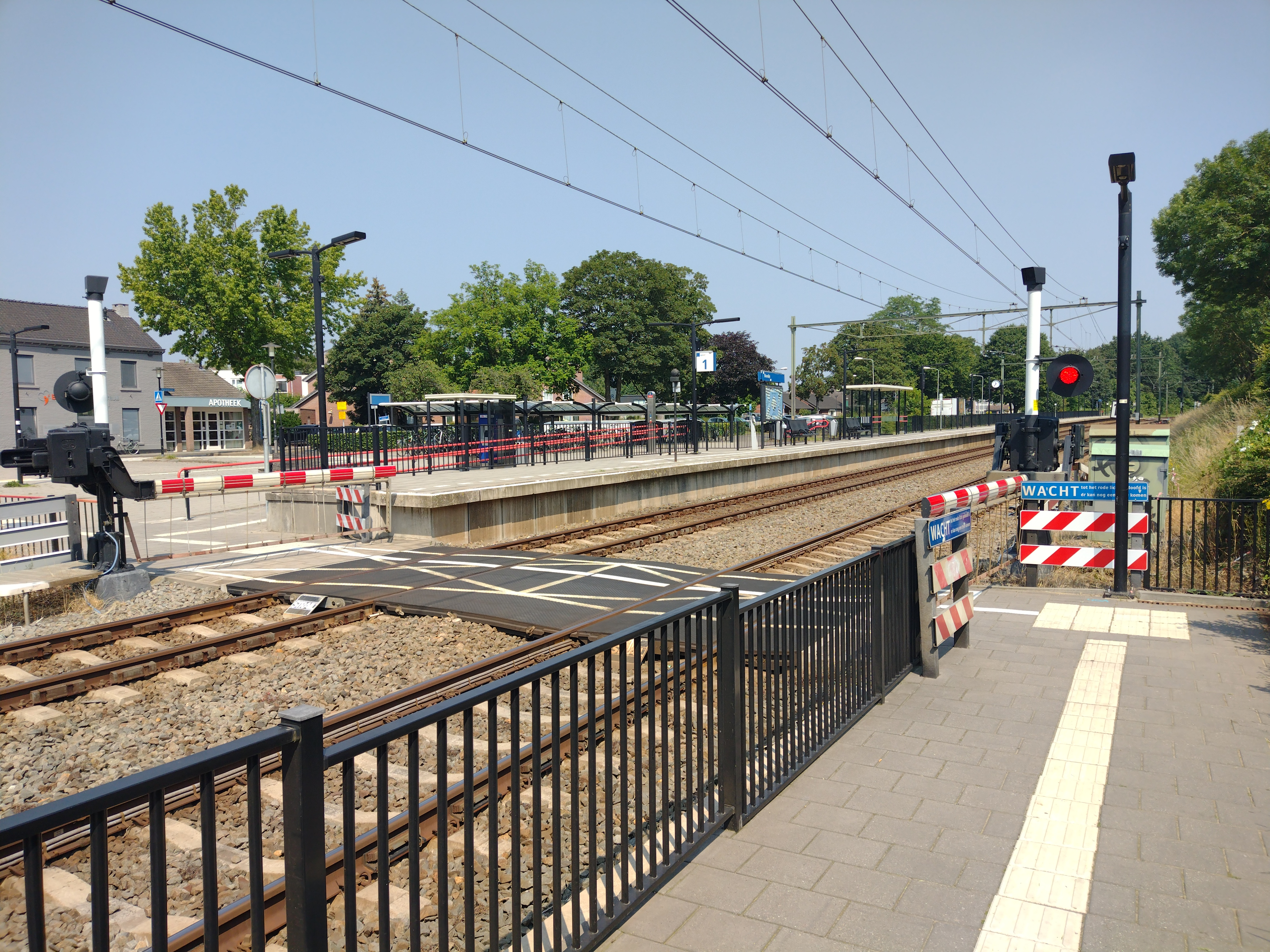

General information
- Location: Bunde; Netherlands
- Coordinates: 50°53′49″N 5°44′11″E
- Line: Maastricht–Venlo railway
- Tracks: 2

Other information
- Station code: Bde

History
- Opened: 1862

Services
Preceding station	Arriva Netherlands	Following station
Beek-Elsloo towards Roermond	Stoptrein 32400	Maastricht towards Maastricht Randwyck
Location
- Location within Netherlands

Bunde railway station located in Bunde, Netherlands. The railway station opened in 1862 on the Maastricht–Venlo railway.

== Train services ==
The following train services by Arriva call at this station:

- Local stoptrein S2: Roermond–Sittard–Maastricht Randwyck

== Bus services ==
- 9
