= Susteren railway station =

Railway station in the Netherlands

Susteren
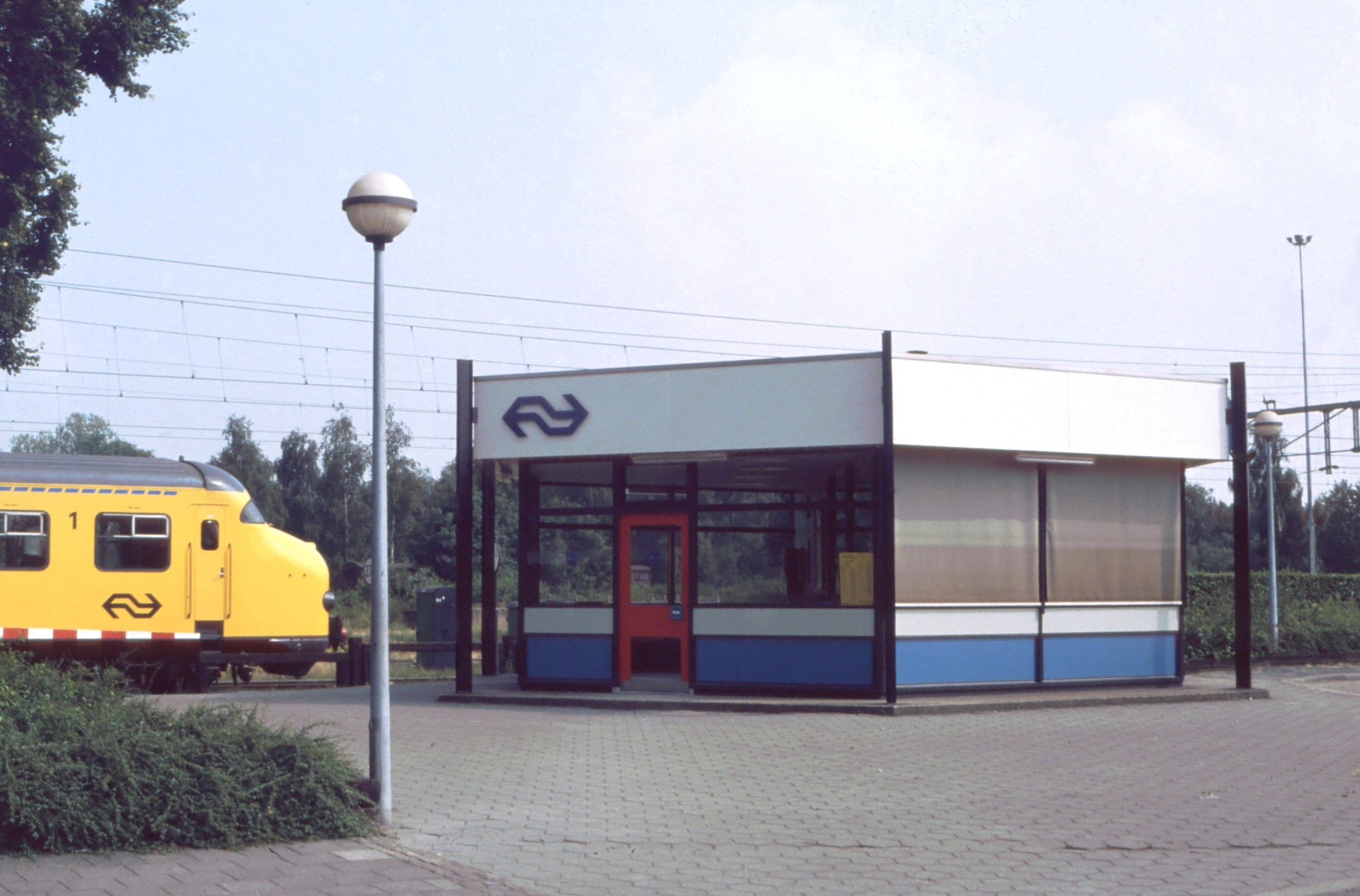

General information
- Location: Susteren, Netherlands
- Coordinates: 51°03′39″N 5°51′46″E
- Owner: Nederlandse Spoorwegen
- Line: Maastricht–Venlo railway
- Platforms: 2
- Tracks: 2

History
- Opened: 1862
- Electrified: 1949

Services
| Preceding station | Arriva Netherlands | Following station |
|---|---|---|
| Echt towards Roermond | Stoptrein 32400 | Sittard towards Maastricht Randwyck |
Location
- Location within Netherlands

Susteren is a railway station in Susteren, Netherlands. The station was opened in 1862 and is located on the Maastricht–Venlo railway, also known as Staatslijn E. Train services are operated by the multinational passenger transport provider Arriva.

== Train services ==
The following train services call at this station:

- Stoptrein: Maastricht Randwyck–Sittard–Roermond

== Bus services ==
- 70: Sittard–Nieuwstadt–Susteren–Roosteren
