= Tegelen railway station =

Railway station in the Netherlands

Tegelen
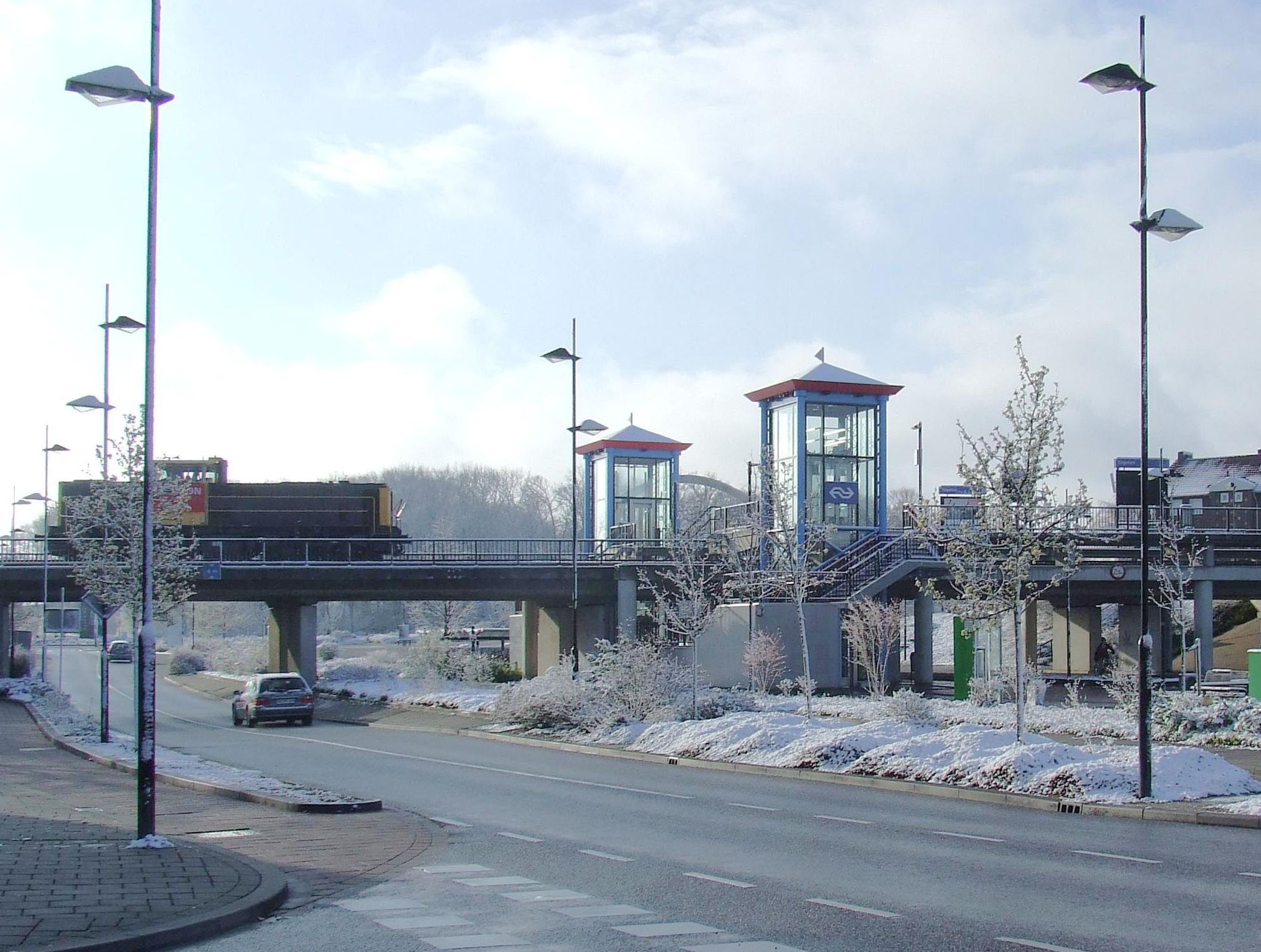
- Tegelen railway station

General information
- Location: Tegelen, Limburg; Netherlands
- Coordinates: 51°20′28″N 6°08′36″E
- Owner: NS Stations
- Line: Maastricht–Venlo railway
- Platforms: 2
- Tracks: 2

History
- Opened: 21 November 1865; 1 May 1940; 1 May 1949
- Closed: 15 May 1938; 4 May 1947
- Rebuilt: 1997

Services
Preceding station	Arriva Netherlands	Following station
Venlo towards Nijmegen	Stoptrein 32200	Reuver towards Roermond
Location
- Location within Netherlands

Tegelen is a railway station in Tegelen, Netherlands. The station was opened on 21 November 1865 and was closed twice during World War II. The station is located on the Maastricht–Venlo railway, also known as the Staatslijn E. The train services are operated by Arriva.

== Train services ==
The following local train services call at this station:

- Stoptrein: Nijmegen–Venlo–Roermond

== Bus services ==
- Line 1: Blerick Vossener–Venlo Station–Venlo Hospital–Tegelen–Tegelen Station–Kaldenkirchen
