= Geleen-Lutterade railway station =

Railway station in the Netherlands

Geleen-Lutterade
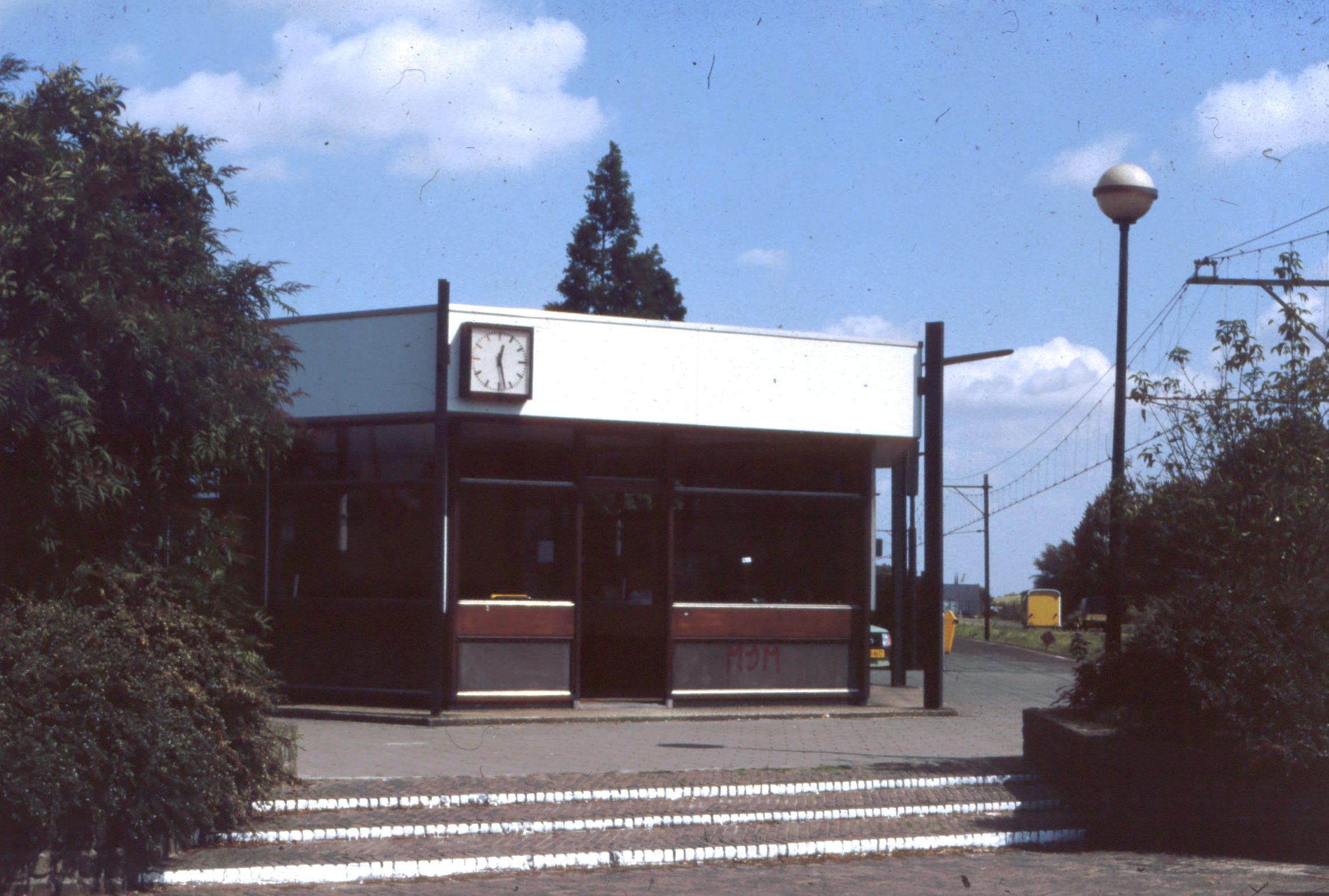

General information
- Location: Lutterade, Sittard-Geleen; Netherlands
- Coordinates: 50°58′31″N 5°49′28″E
- Line: Maastricht–Venlo railway
- Platforms: 1 island platform
- Tracks: 2

Other information
- Station code: Lut

History
- Opened: 1862

Services
Preceding station	Arriva Netherlands	Following station
Sittard towards Roermond	Stoptrein 32400	Beek-Elsloo towards Maastricht Randwyck
Location
- Location within Netherlands

Geleen-Lutterade railway station is located in the neighbourhood Lutterade within the municipality of Sittard-Geleen, Netherlands. The railway station opened in 1862 on the Maastricht–Venlo railway. The station was originally called Geleen but later changed to Lutterade. The station received its current name in 1954.

== Train services ==
The following train services by Arriva call at this station:

- Local stoptrein S2: Roermond–Sittard–Maastricht Randwyck
