= Beek-Elsloo railway station =

Railway station in the Netherlands

Beek-Elsloo
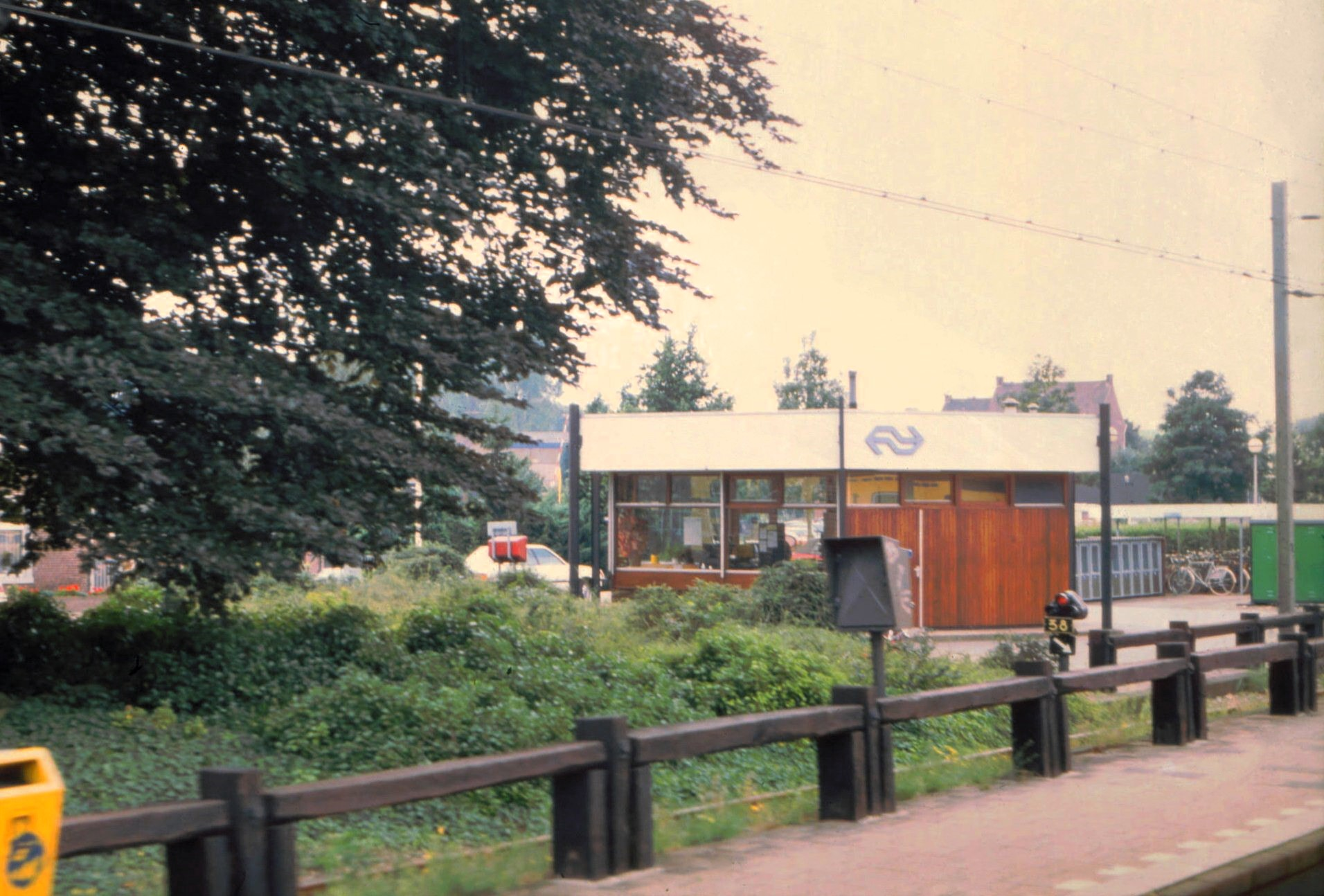
- Station building (1988)

General information
- Location: Beek, Elsloo; Netherlands
- Coordinates: 50°56′49″N 5°47′09″E
- Line: Maastricht–Venlo railway
- Platforms: 2 side platforms
- Tracks: 2

Other information
- Station code: Bk

History
- Opened: 1862

Services
Preceding station	Arriva Netherlands	Following station
Geleen-Lutterade towards Roermond	Stoptrein 32400	Bunde towards Maastricht Randwyck
Location
- Location within Netherlands

Beek-Elsloo railway station is located between the villages of Elsloo and Beek, in the Dutch municipality of Beek. The station opened in 1862 on the Maastricht–Venlo railway.

== Train services ==
The following train services by Arriva call at this station:

- Local stoptrein S2: Roermond–Sittard–Maastricht Randwyck
