= Schinnen railway station =

Railway station in the Netherlands

Schinnen
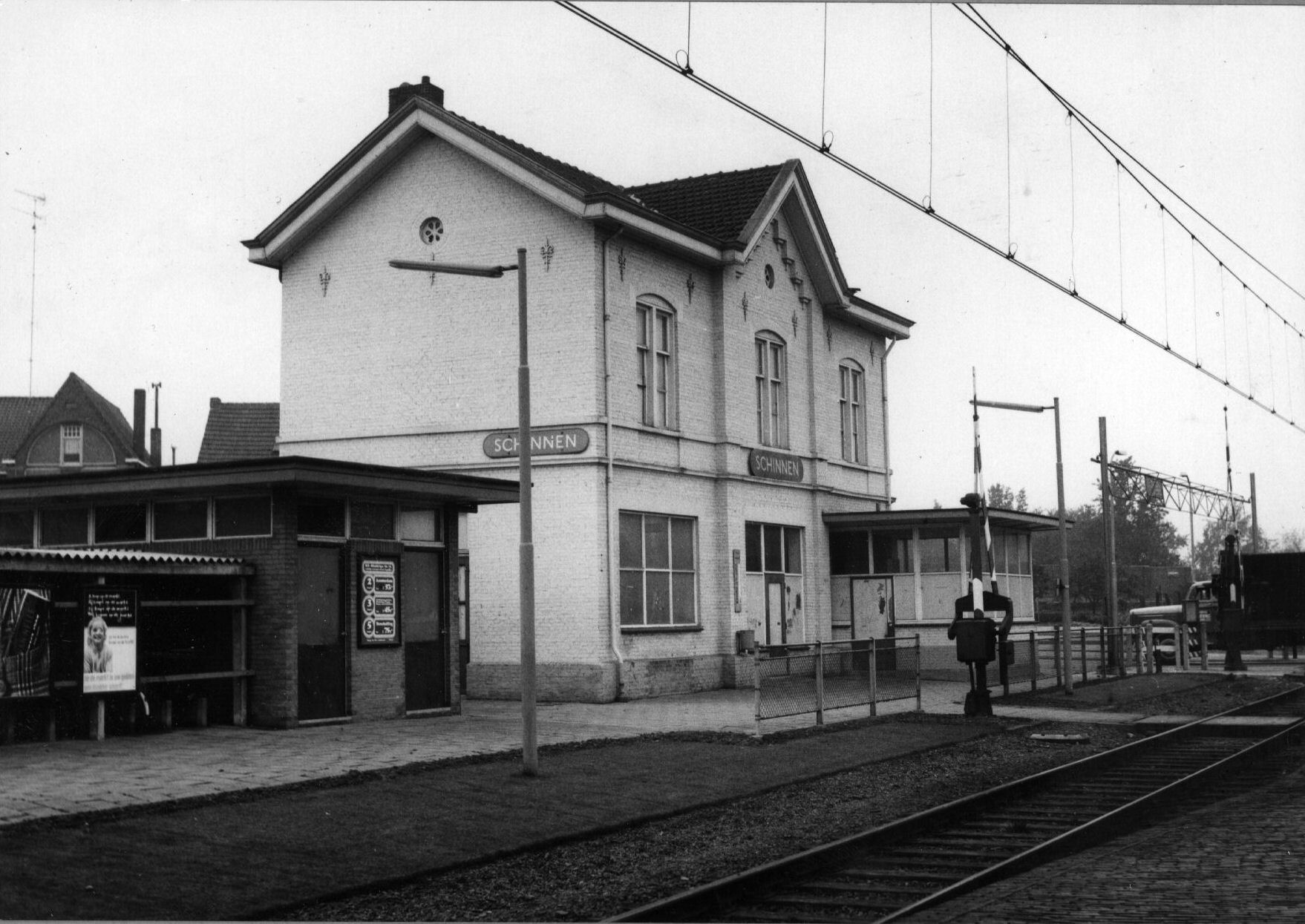
- View of the platform side of the Schinnen train station in Schinnen shortly before demolition.

General information
- Location: Netherlands
- Coordinates: 50°56′19″N 5°52′34″E
- Line: Sittard–Herzogenrath railway

History
- Opened: 1896

Services
Preceding station	Arriva Netherlands	Following station
Spaubeek towards Sittard	Stoptrein 32500	Nuth towards Kerkrade Centrum
Location
- Location within Netherlands

Schinnen is a railway station located in Schinnen, Netherlands. The station was opened on 1 May 1896 and is located on the Sittard–Herzogenrath railway. Train services are operated by Arriva.

== Train services ==
The following local train services call at this station:

- Stoptrein: Sittard–Heerlen–Kerkrade
