= Spaubeek railway station =

Railway station in the Netherlands

Spaubeek
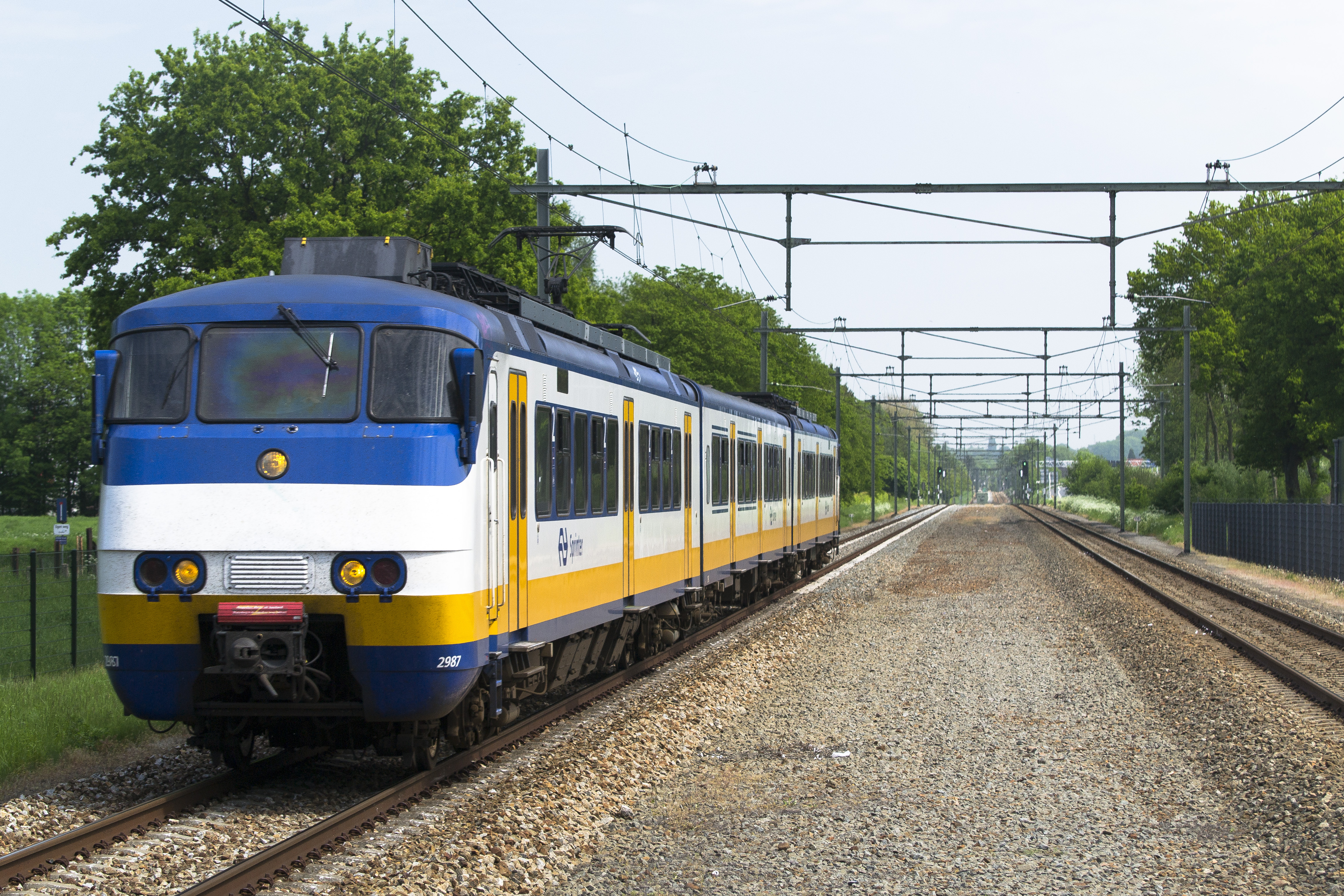
- NS SGM #2987 approaches Spaubeek (2013)

General information
- Location: Netherlands
- Coordinates: 50°56′35″N 5°50′59″E
- Line: Sittard–Herzogenrath railway

History
- Opened: 1896

Services
Preceding station	Arriva Netherlands	Following station
Geleen Oost towards Sittard	Stoptrein 32500	Schinnen towards Kerkrade Centrum
Location
- Location within Netherlands

Spaubeek is a railway station located in the village of Spaubeek, in the Dutch municipality of Beek. The station was opened on 1 May 1896 and is located on the Sittard–Herzogenrath railway. Train services are operated by Arriva.

== Train services ==
The following local train services call at this station:

- Stoptrein: Sittard–Heerlen–Kerkrade
