= Lutterade =

District in Geleen, Limburg

Coordinates: 50°58′42″N 5°49′25″E

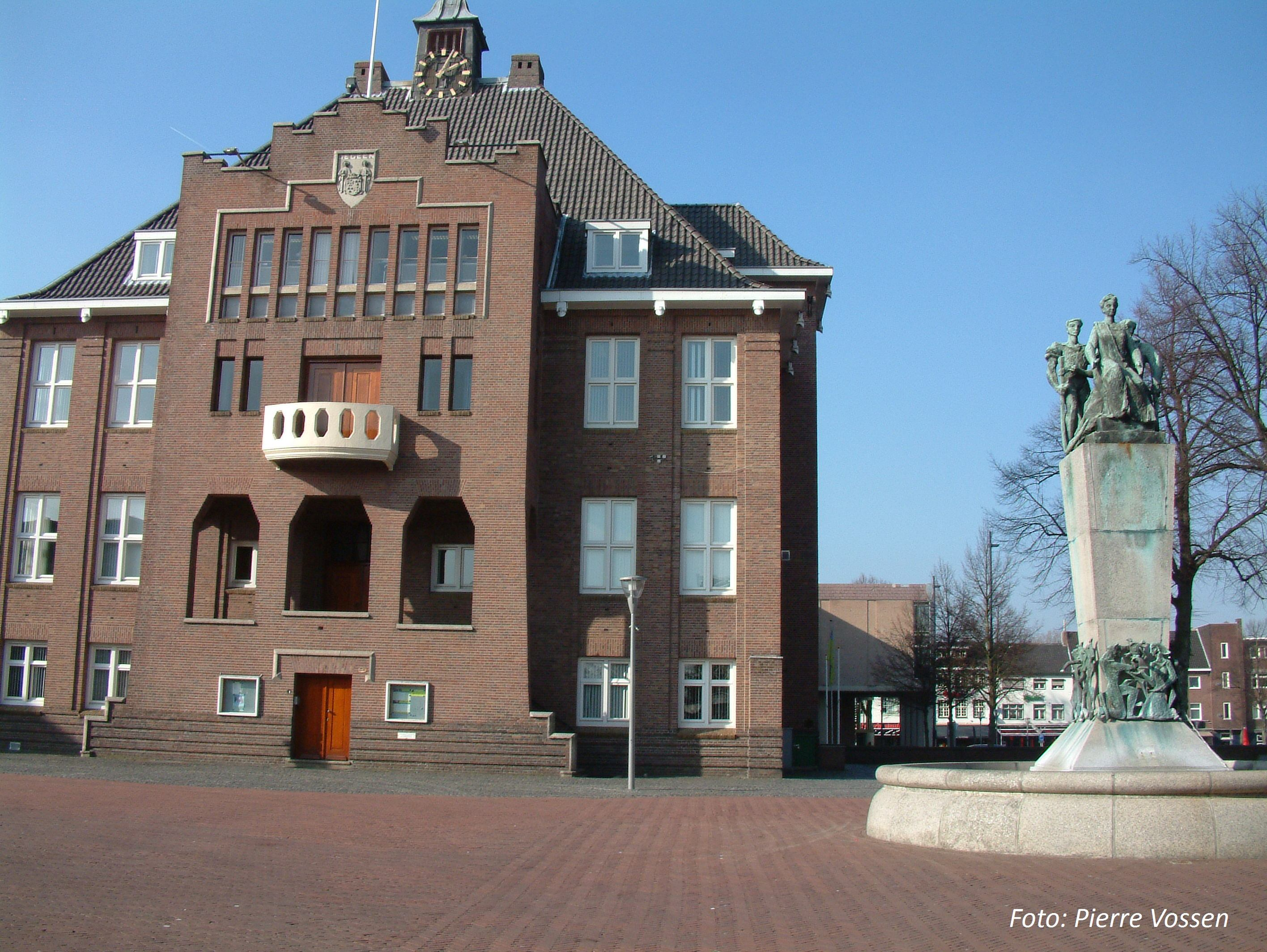
The Town Hall of the former municipality of Geleen

Lutterade (Dutch pronunciation: [ˈlʏtəˌraːdə]; Limburgish: Lötterao [ˈlœtəʀɔː]) is a district of Geleen and later Sittard-Geleen (a municipality in the southeastern Netherlands, in the province of Limburg).

== Transportation ==
Railway Station: Geleen-Lutterade
