= Hoensbroek railway station =

Railway station in the Netherlands

Hoensbroek
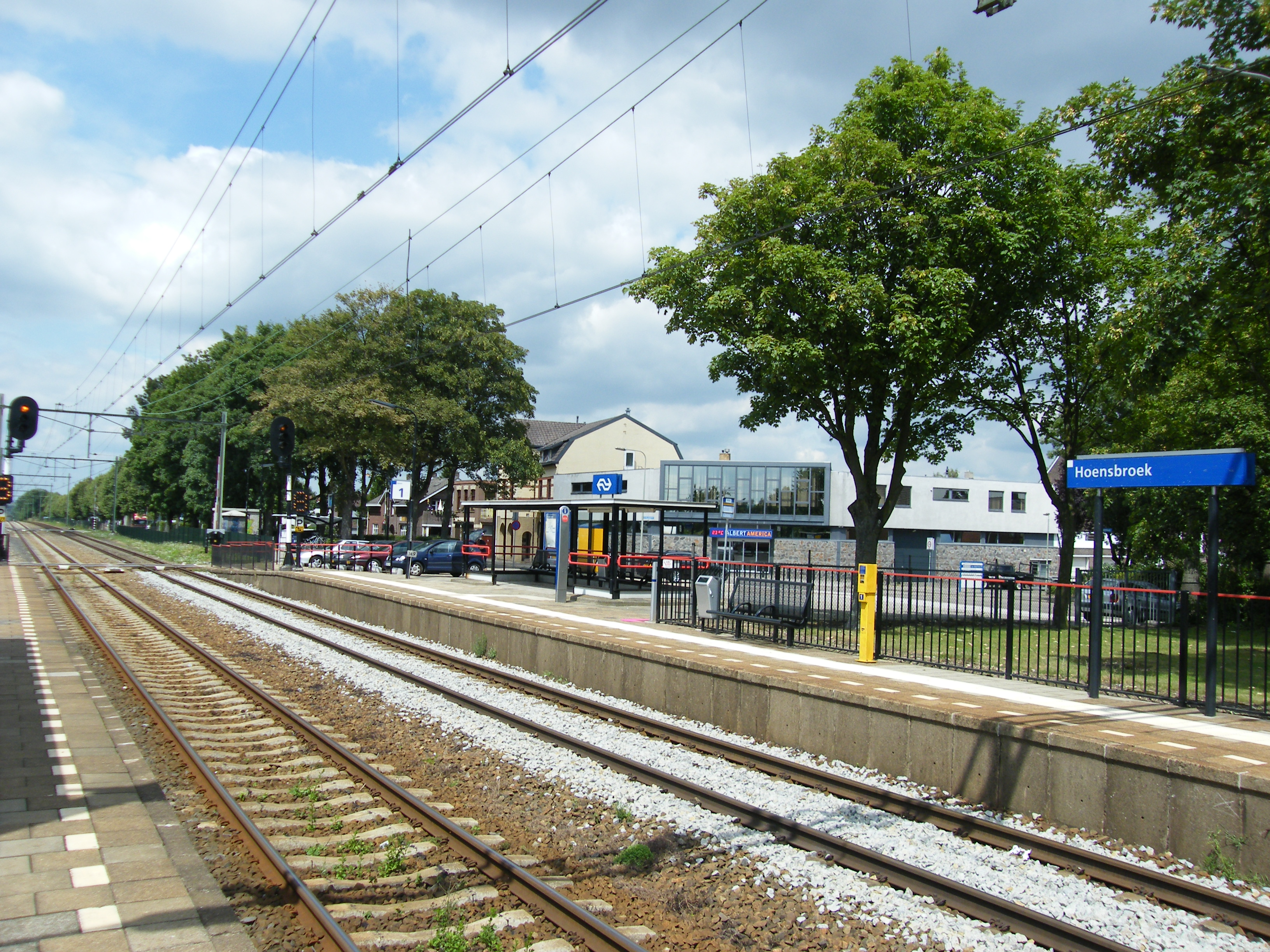

General information
- Location: Netherlands
- Coordinates: 50°54′19″N 5°55′52″E
- Line: Sittard–Herzogenrath railway

History
- Opened: 1896

Services
Preceding station	Arriva Netherlands	Following station
Nuth towards Sittard	Stoptrein 32500	Heerlen towards Kerkrade Centrum
Location
- Location within Netherlands

Hoensbroek is a railway station located in Hoensbroek, The Netherlands. The station was opened in 1896 and is located on the Sittard–Herzogenrath railway. Train services are operated by Arriva.

== Train services ==
The following local train services call at this station:

- Stoptrein: Sittard–Heerlen–Kerkrade
