= Swalmen railway station =

Railway station in the Netherlands

Swalmen
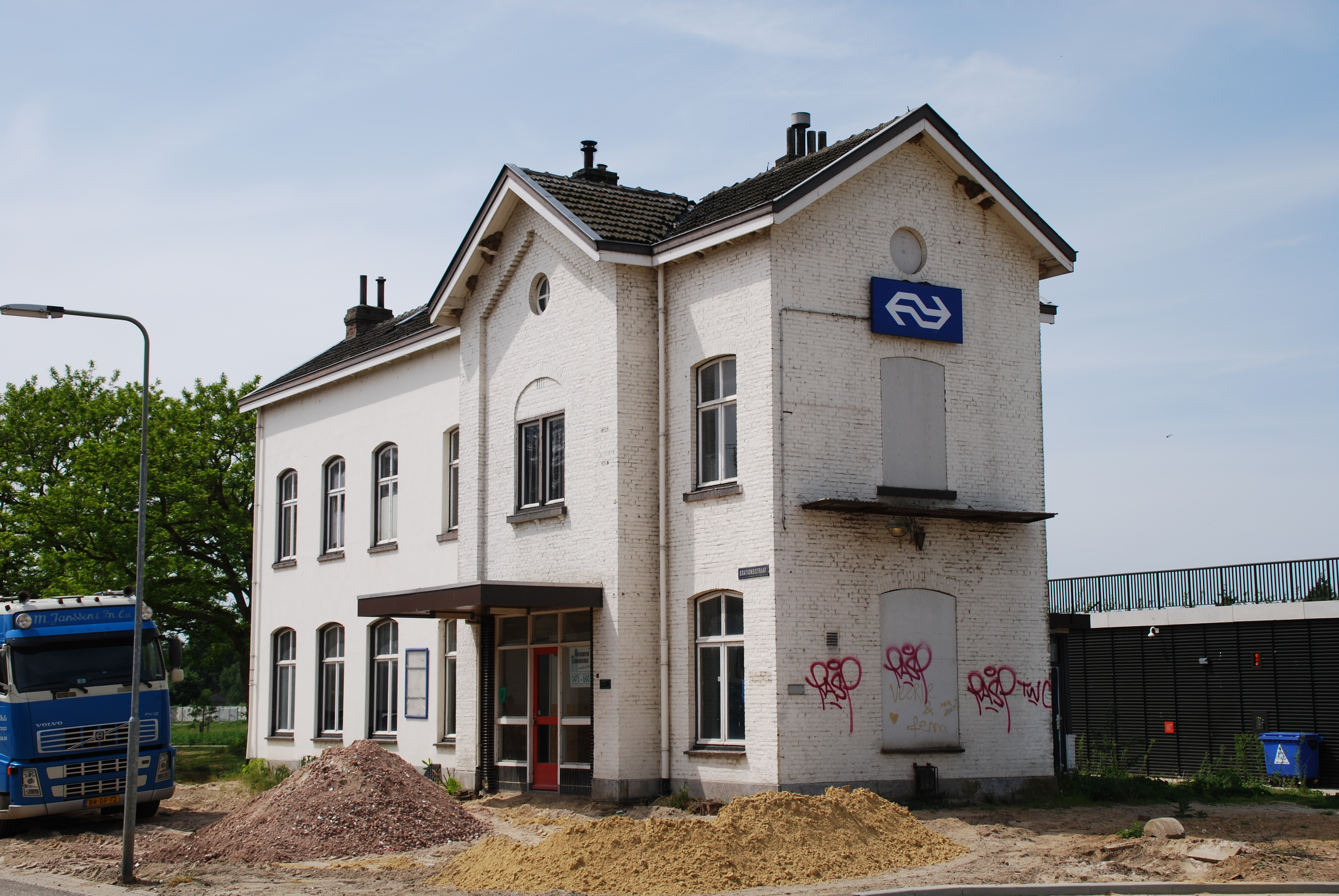
- Swalmen railway station

General information
- Location: Swalmen, Netherlands
- Coordinates: 51°14′09″N 6°01′57″E
- Owner: NS Stations
- Line: Maastricht–Venlo railway
- Platforms: 2
- Tracks: 2

History
- Opened: 1862

Services
Preceding station	Arriva Netherlands	Following station
Reuver towards Nijmegen	Stoptrein 32200	Roermond Terminus
Location
- Location within Netherlands

Swalmen is a railway station in Swalmen, Roermond, Netherlands. The station was opened in 1862 and is located on the Maastricht–Venlo railway, also known as the Staatslijn E. Train services are operated by Arriva.

== Train services ==
The following local train services call at this station:

- Stoptrein: Nijmegen–Venlo–Roermond

== Bus service ==
- 66: Venlo–Tegelen–Belfeld–Reuver–Swalmen–Roermond
