= Nuth railway station =

Railway station in the Netherlands

Nuth
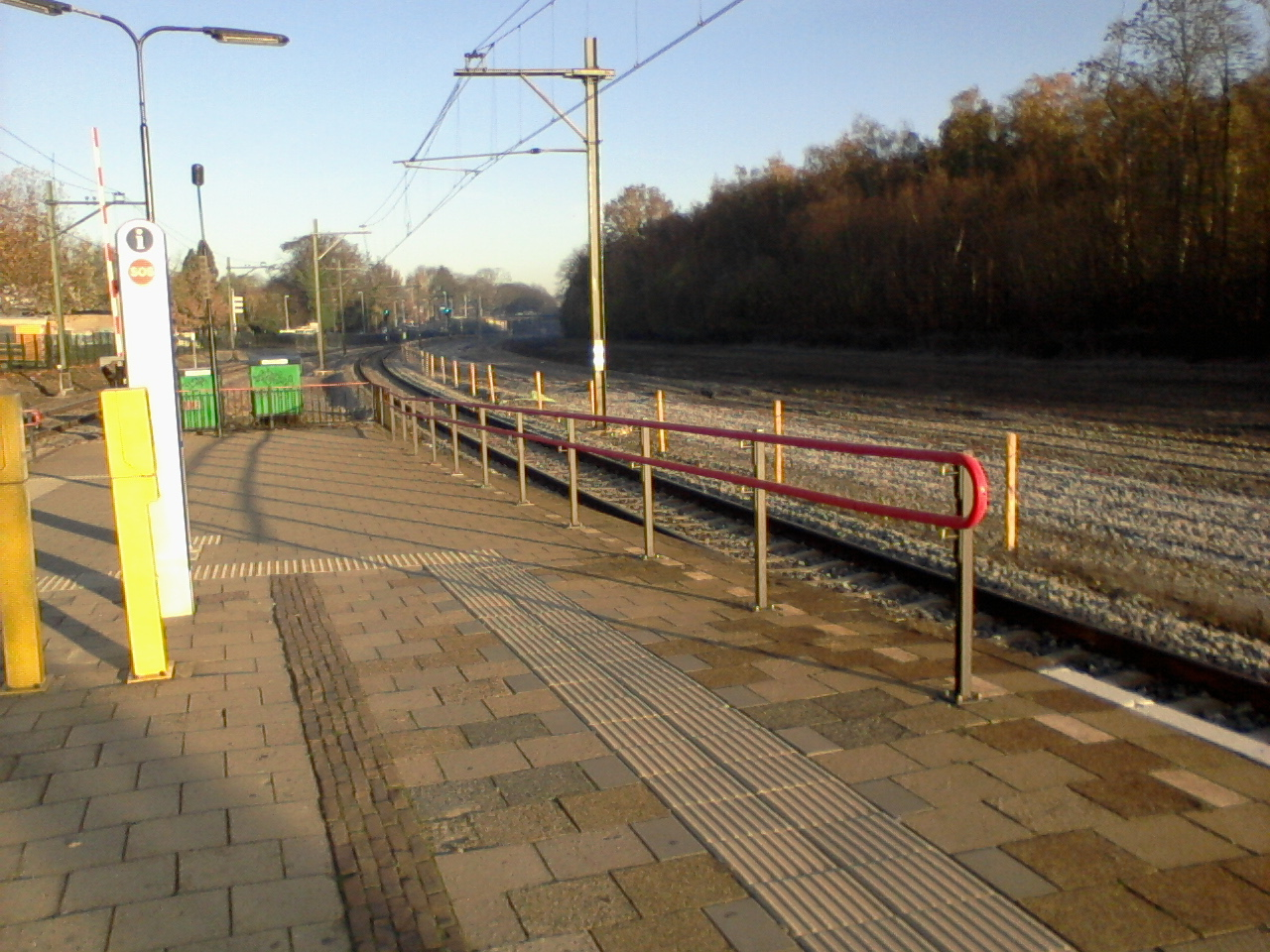

General information
- Location: Netherlands
- Coordinates: 50°55′11″N 5°53′33″E
- Line: Sittard–Herzogenrath railway

History
- Opened: 1896

Services
Preceding station	Arriva Netherlands	Following station
Schinnen towards Sittard	Stoptrein 32500	Hoensbroek towards Kerkrade Centrum
Location
- Location within Netherlands

Nuth is a railway station located in Nuth, Netherlands. The station was built in 1893 and opened in 1896. It is located on the Sittard–Herzogenrath railway. Train services are operated by Arriva.

== Train services ==
The following local train services call at this station:

- Stoptrein: Sittard–Heerlen–Kerkrade
