= Elsloo, Limburg =

Elsloo
- Village
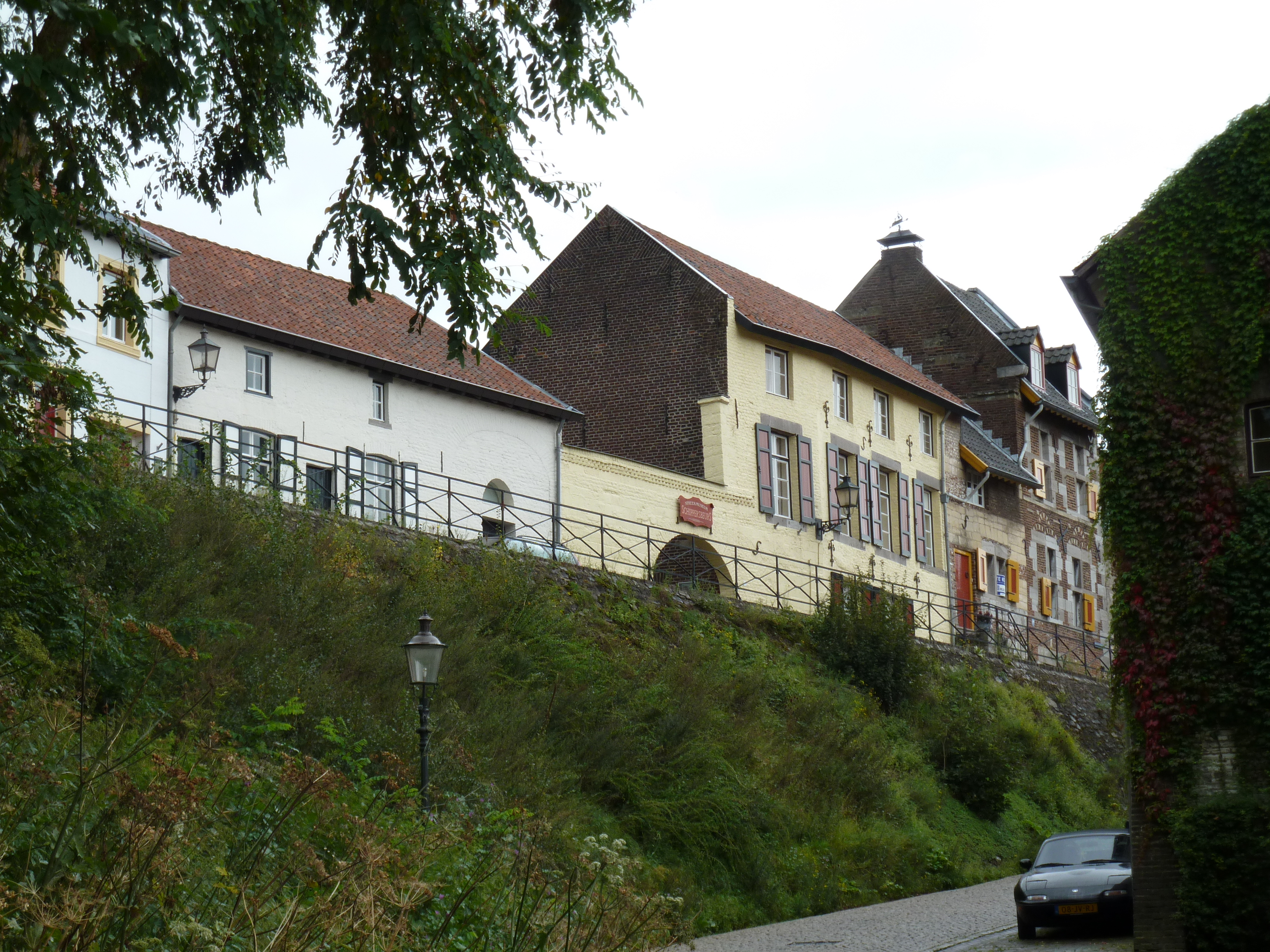
- Op de Berg as seen from Maasberg

- Location in the Netherlands Location in the province of Limburg in the Netherlands
- Coordinates: 50°57′1″N 5°46′7″E
- Country: Netherlands
- Province: Limburg
- Municipality: Stein

Area
  - Total: 3.64 km^{2} (1.41 sq mi)
- Elevation: 68 m (223 ft)

Population (2021)
  - Total: 6,955
  - Density: 1,910/km^{2} (4,950/sq mi)
- Time zone: UTC+1 (CET)
  - Summer (DST): UTC+2 (CEST)
- Postal code: 6181
- Dialing code: 046

Elsloo is a village in the Dutch province of Limburg. It is located in the municipality of Stein, about 2 km south of the town of Stein itself. Beek-Elsloo railway station serves Elsloo.

== History ==
The village was first mentioned in 855 (CL I, 23; RI I, 1277), than 1002 as Elisla, and means "forest with alder trees". Elsloo developed in the Early Middle Ages in the valley of the Maas. The Maas flooded the village several times, and in 1459 the church was moved to higher grounds.

Elsloo Castle was built in the 12th century and was flooded in the early-17th century. The brewery was converted into a castle and extended. It suffered from fires in 1835 and 1885. A Gothic Revival style corner tower was added in 1838.

The Catholic St Augustinus Church is a three aisled church built between 1848 and 1849 as a replacement of the 1459 church.

Elsloo was home to 495 people in 1840. Until 1982, when it was merged with Stein, Elsloo was a separate municipality, also incorporating the smaller villages of Meers and Catsop.

The first artificially inseminated calf in the Netherlands was born on 5 December 1935 at the farm of Jan Werner in Elsloo. The father was Sjors from Lierop who later fathered many children.

== Gallery ==
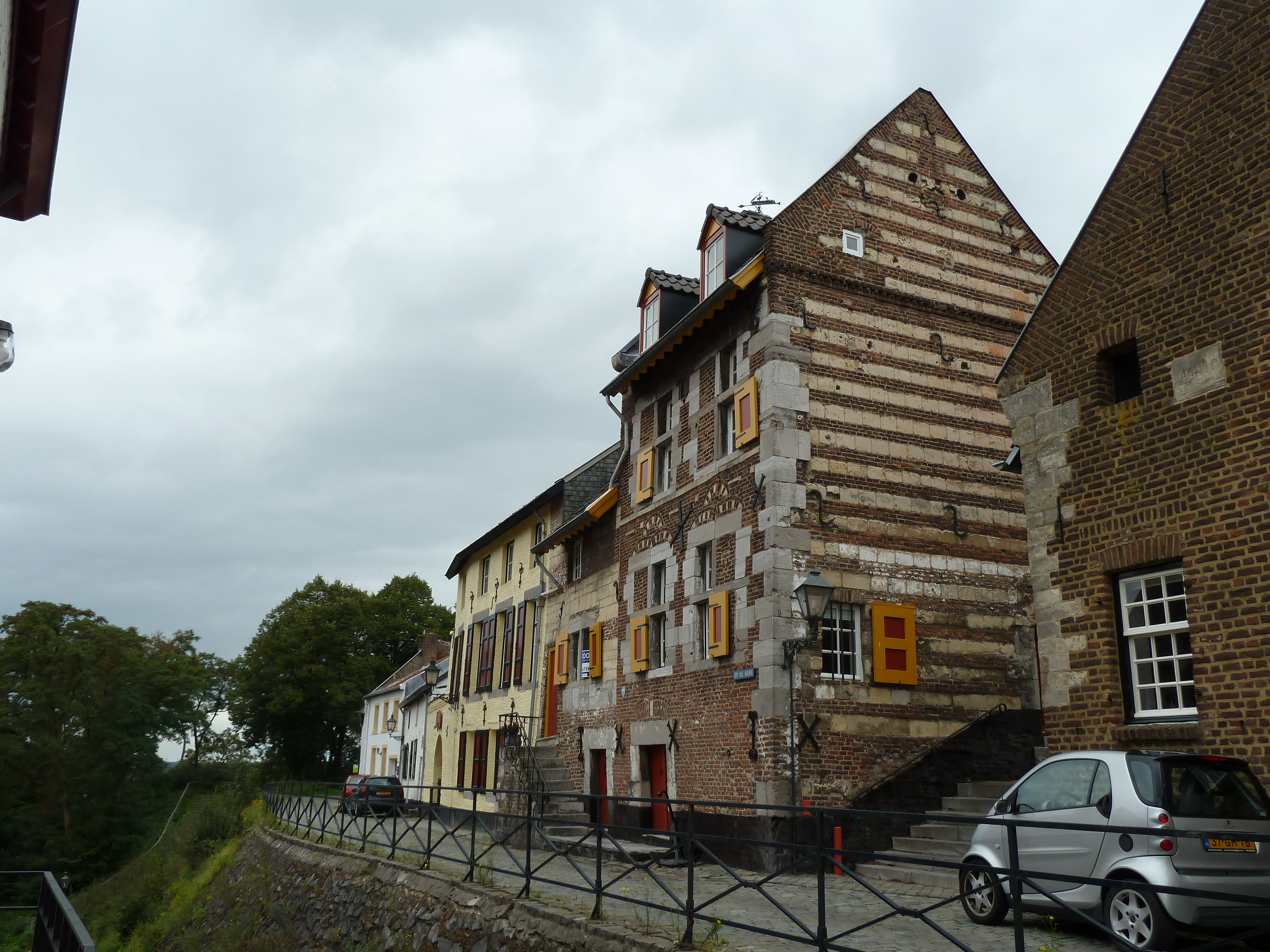
Op de Berg

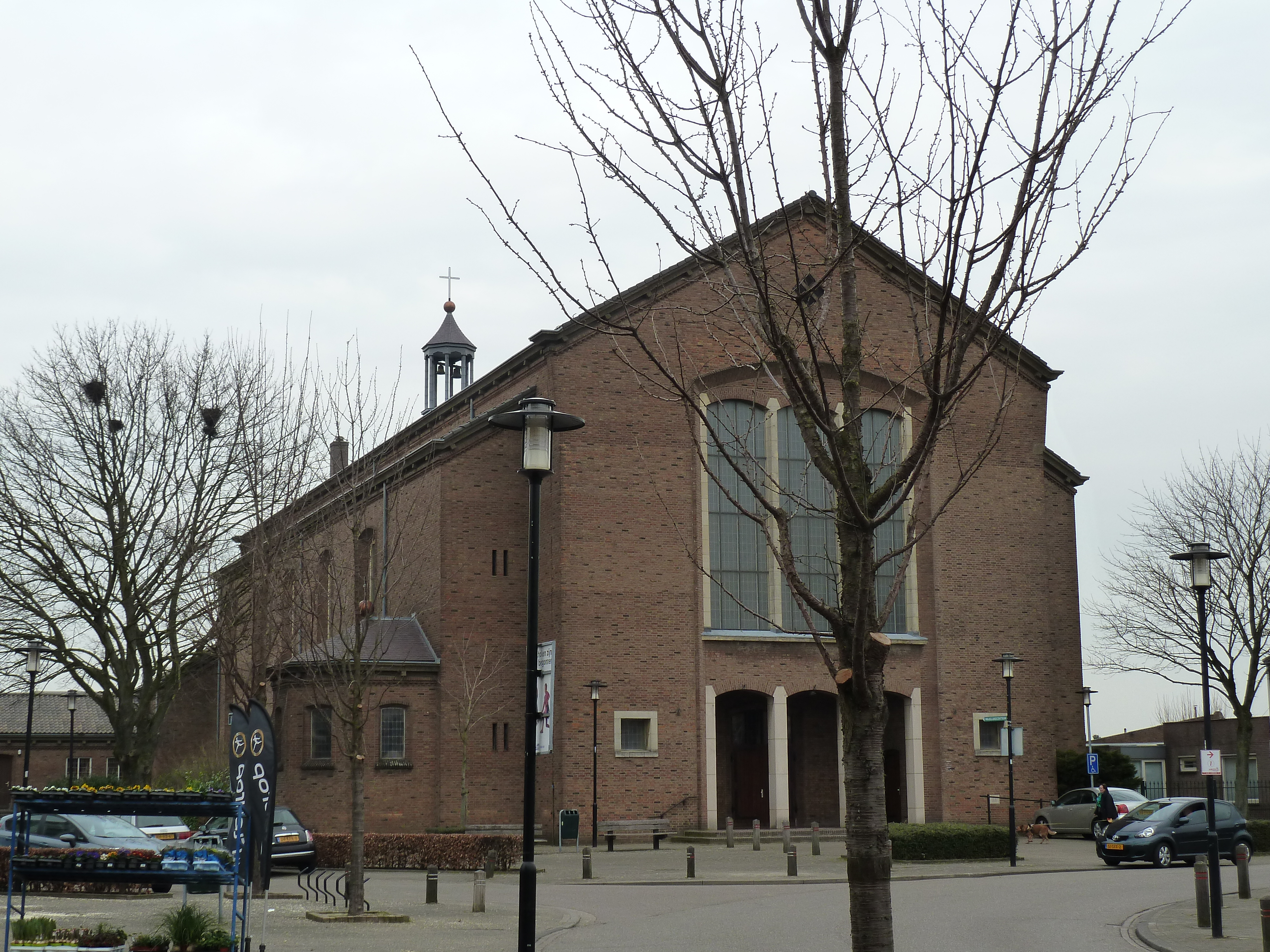
Mariakerk (St. Mary Roman Catholic church)

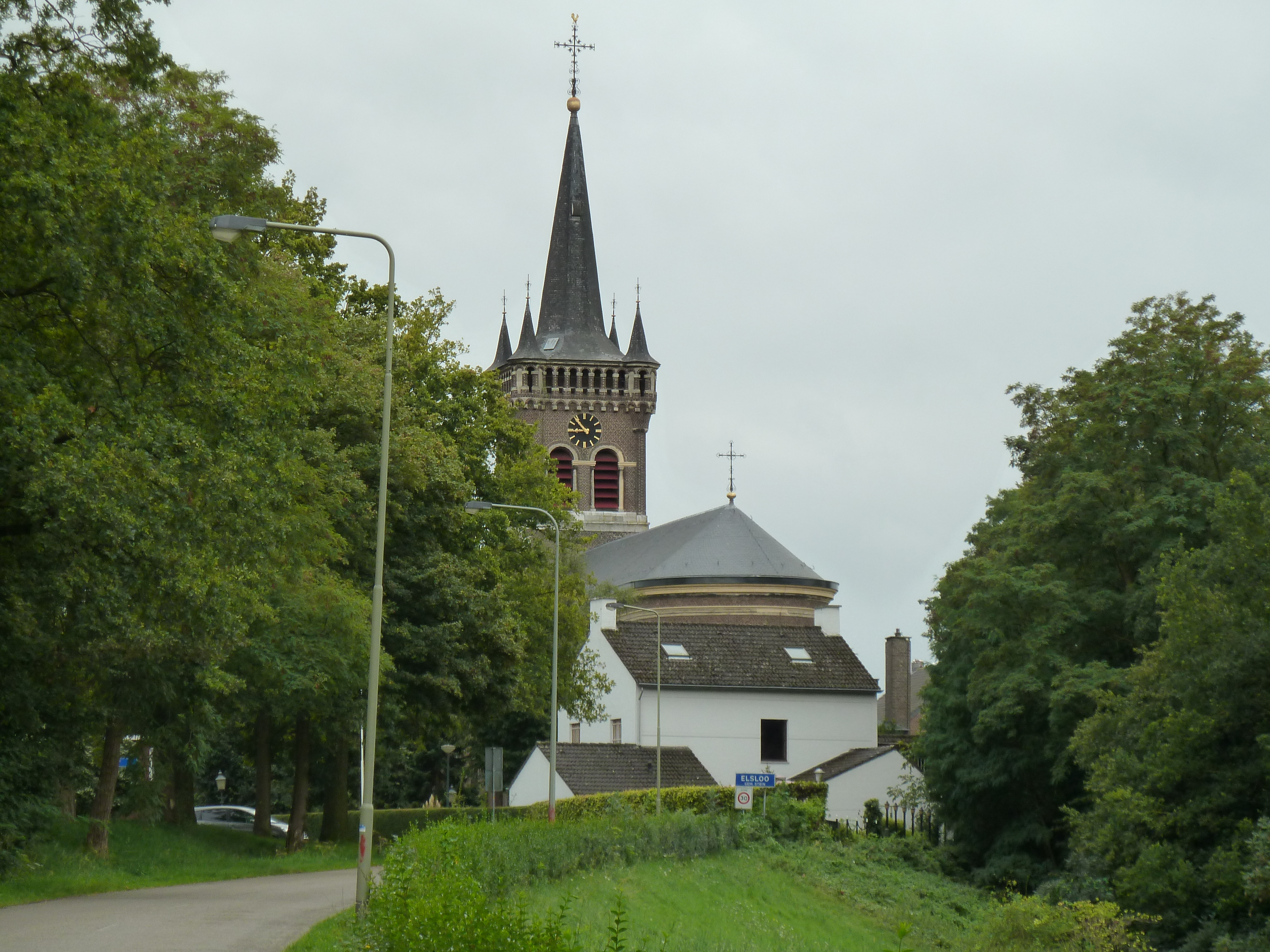
Augustinuskerk (St. Augustine Roman Catholic church)

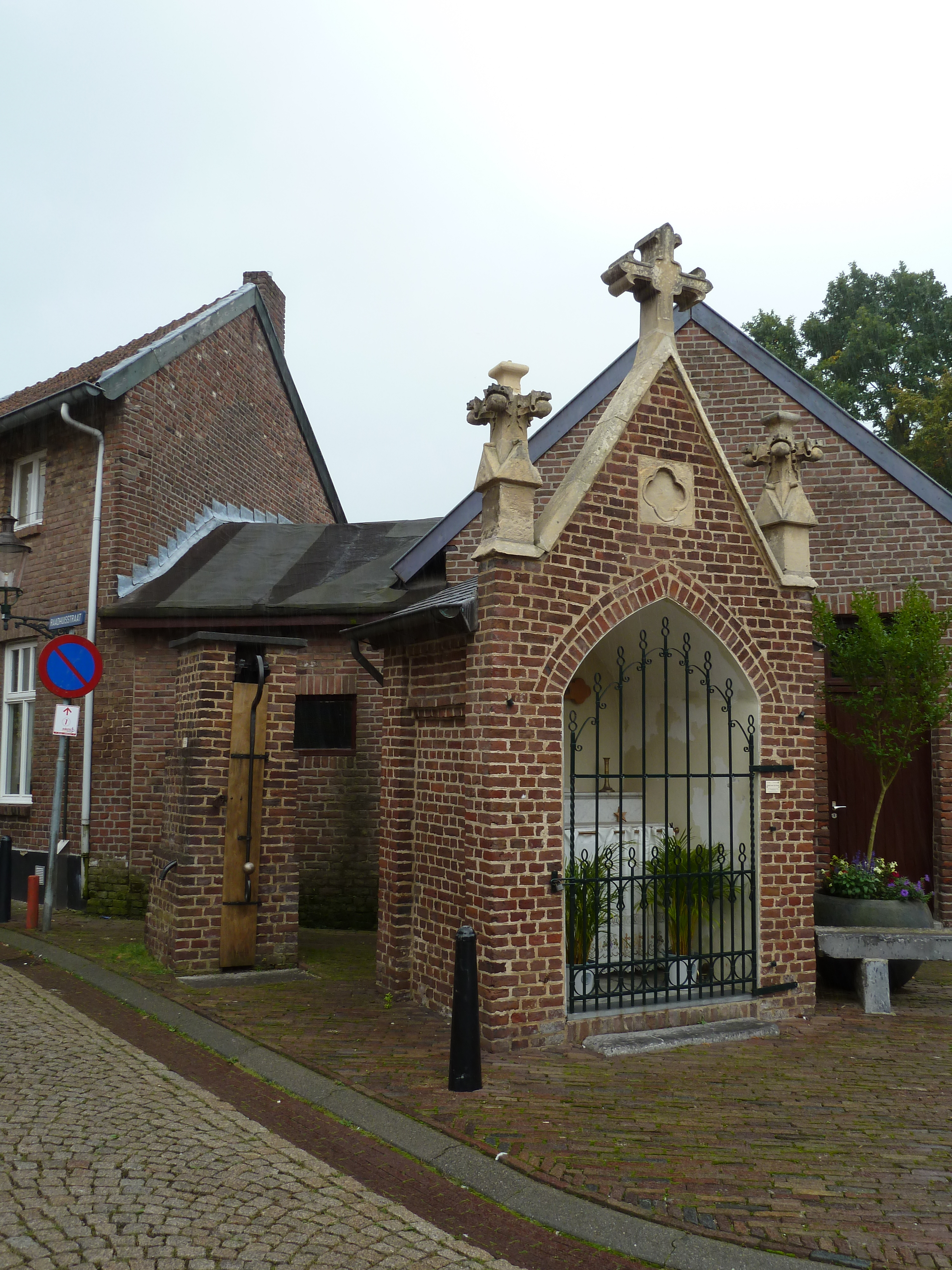
Pump and chapel at Raadhuisstraat & Kaakstraat
