= Lichtenvoorde-Groenlo railway station =

Railway station in the Netherlands

Lichtenvoorde-Groenlo
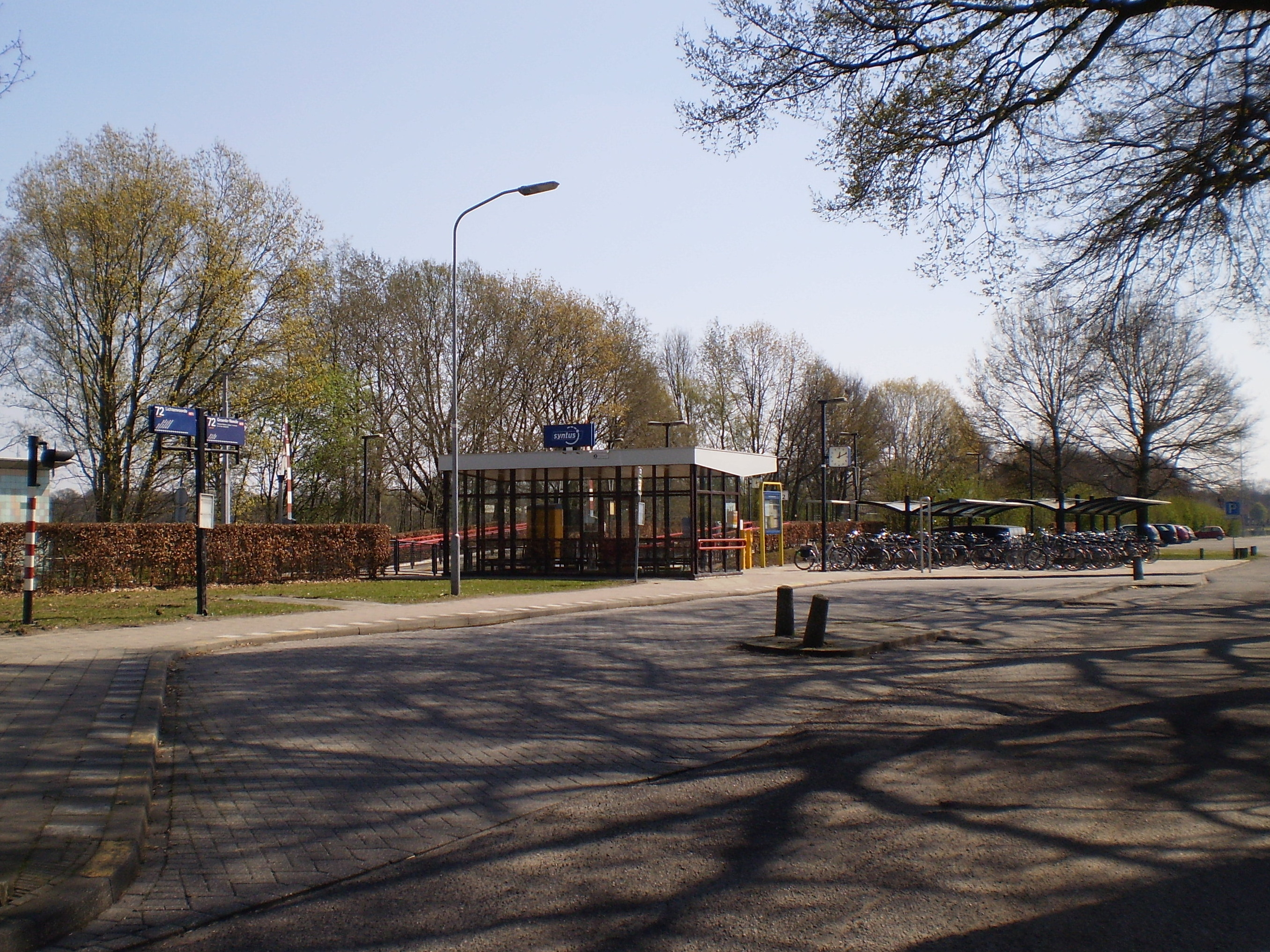
- Lichtenvoorde-Groenlo railway station in 2010

General information
- Location: Netherlands
- Coordinates: 52°00′42″N 6°35′47″E
- Line: Zutphen–Winterswijk railway

History
- Opened: 1878

Services
Preceding station	Arriva Netherlands	Following station
Ruurlo towards Zutphen	Stoptrein 30800	Winterswijk West towards Winterswijk
Location
- Location within Netherlands

Lichtenvoorde-Groenlo is a railway station serving the villages of Lichtenvoorde and Groenlo. The station, which opened on 24 June 1878, is located on the Zutphen–Winterswijk railway line. Although the station name includes Lichtenvoorde and Groenlo, it is actually situated in the village of Lievelde.

The station is operated by Arriva, a regional public transport company, providing train services for the area. Despite its location in Lievelde, the station is an important transport link for residents of both Lichtenvoorde and Groenlo, connecting them to other parts of the region.

== Train services ==
Route	Service type	Operator	Notes
Zutphen – Winterswijk	Local ("Sprinter")	Arriva	2× per hour (only 1× per hour after 20:00 on Saturday and Sunday mornings)

=== Bus services ===
Line	Route	Operator	Notes
72	Lichtenvoorde – Lievelde – Groenlo – Eibergen – Neede	Arriva	Only runs 1× per hour between Groenlo and Neede during part of the morning, evenings and weekends.
191	Aalten – Bredevoort – Barlo – Lichtenvoorde – Lievelde – Lichtenvoorde – Zieuwent – Marienvelde – Ruurlo	Arriva	On evenings and weekends, this bus only operates if called one hour before its supposed departure ("belbus") and only between Aalten and Mariënvelde and Zieuwent and Ruurlo.
