= Ruurlo railway station =

Railway station in the Netherlands

Ruurlo
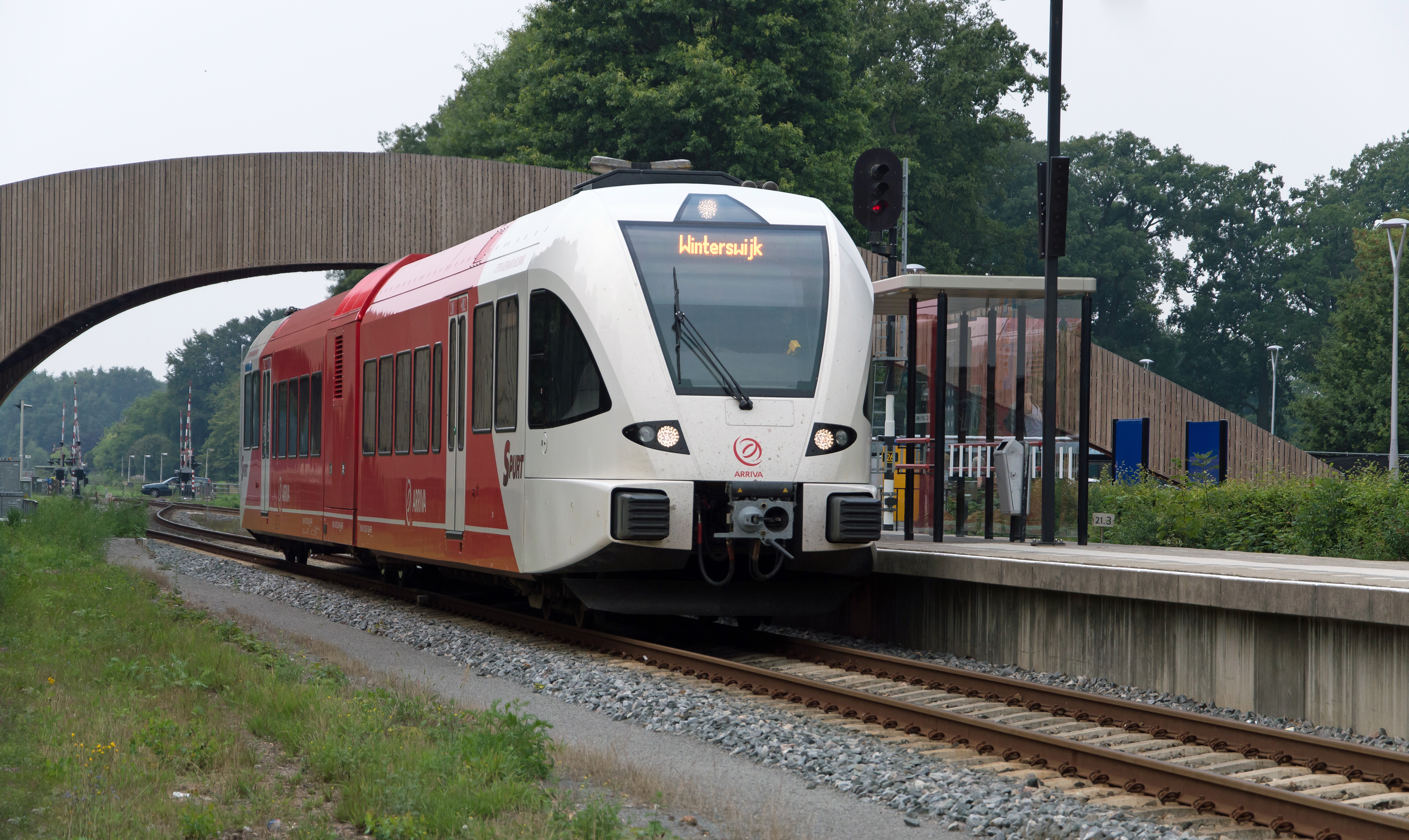
- Ruurlo railway station in 2013

General information
- Location: Netherlands
- Coordinates: 52°04′50″N 6°27′00″E
- Line: Zutphen–Winterswijk railway

History
- Opened: 1878
- Closed

Services
Preceding station	Arriva Netherlands	Following station
Vorden towards Zutphen	Stoptrein 30800	Lichtenvoorde-Groenlo towards Winterswijk
Location
- Location within Netherlands

Ruurlo is a railway station in Ruurlo, Netherlands. The station opened on 24 June 1878 and is located on the Zutphen–Winterswijk railway. The train services are operated by Arriva. In 1884 the Ruurlo - Hengelo railway line opened and was extended from Ruurlo to Doetinchem in 1885. This line has now been closed.

== Train services ==
Route	Service type	Operator	Notes
Zutphen - Winterswijk	Local ("Stoptrein")	Arriva	2x per hour (only 1x per hour after 20:00, on Saturday mornings and Sundays)

=== Bus services ===
Line	Route	Operator	Notes
23	Borculo - Ruurlo - Veldhoek - Wolfersveen - Zelhem - Doetinchem	Arriva	
191	Aalten - Bredevoort - Barlo - Lichtenvoorde - Lievelde - Lichtenvoorde - Zieuwent - Marienvelde - Ruurlo	Arriva	On evenings and weekends, this bus only operates if called one hour before its supposed departure ("belbus") and only between Aalten and Mariënvelde and Zieuwent and Ruurlo.
623	Borculo → Ruurlo → Veldhoek → Wolfersveen → Zelhem → Doetinchem	Arriva	Only runs during morning rush hour.
