= Winterswijk West railway station =

Railway station in the Netherlands

Winterswijk West
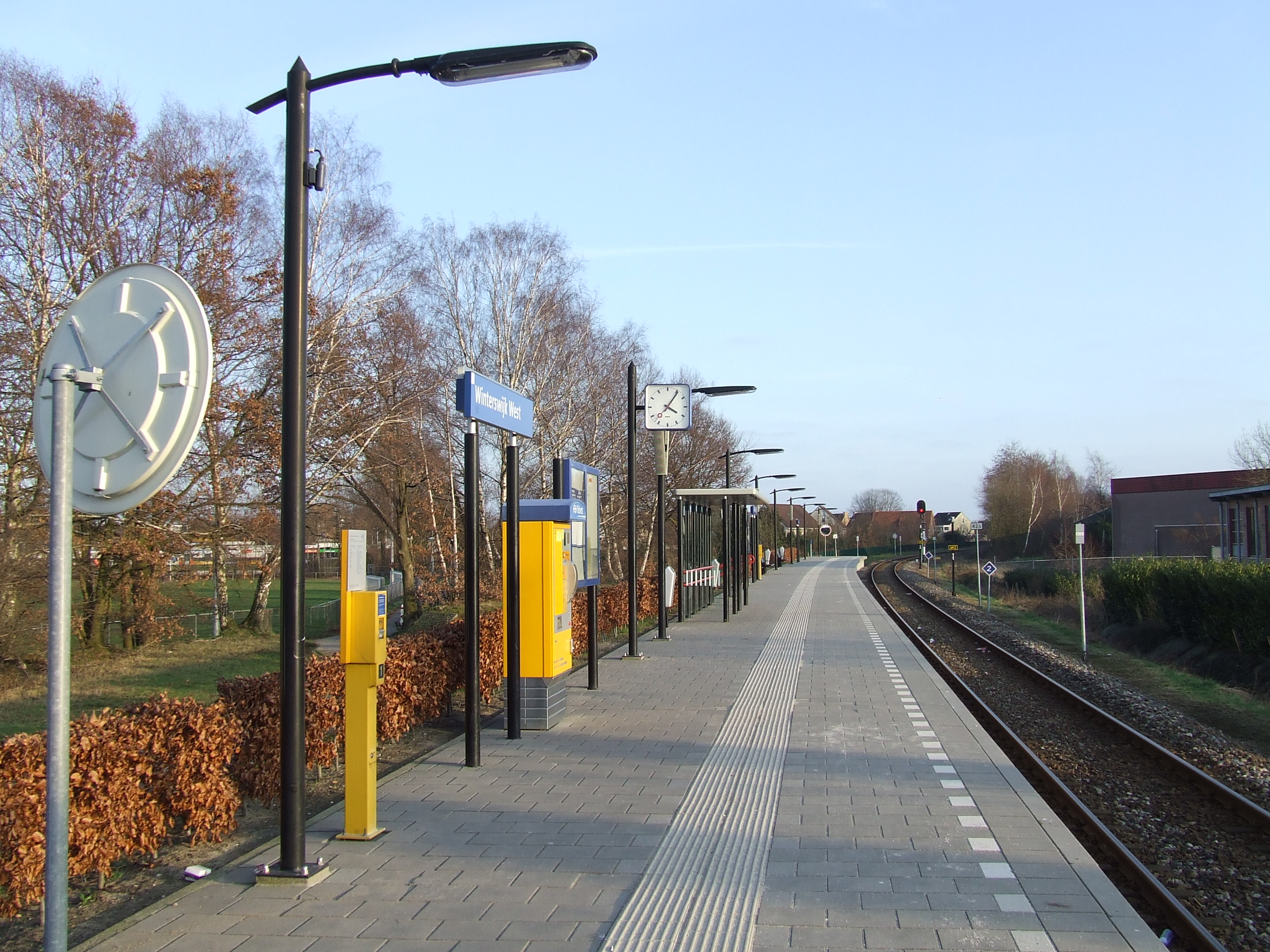
- Winterswijk West railway station in 2007

General information
- Location: Netherlands
- Coordinates: 51°58′28″N 6°42′13″E
- Line: Zutphen–Winterswijk railway

History
- Opened: 2001

Services
Preceding station	Arriva Netherlands	Following station
Lichtenvoorde-Groenlo towards Zutphen	Stoptrein 30800	Winterswijk Terminus
Location
- Location within Netherlands

Winterswijk West is a railway station in Winterswijk, Netherlands. The station opened on 10 June 2001 and is located on the Zutphen–Winterswijk railway. The train services are operated by Arriva.

== Train services ==
Route	Service type	Operator	Notes
Zutphen - Winterswijk	Local ("Sprinter")	Arriva	2x per hour (only 1x per hour after 20:00, on Saturday mornings and Sundays)

=== Bus services ===
There is no bus services at this station. The nearest bus stop is at the Groenloseweg.
