= Vorden railway station =

Railway station in the Netherlands

Vorden
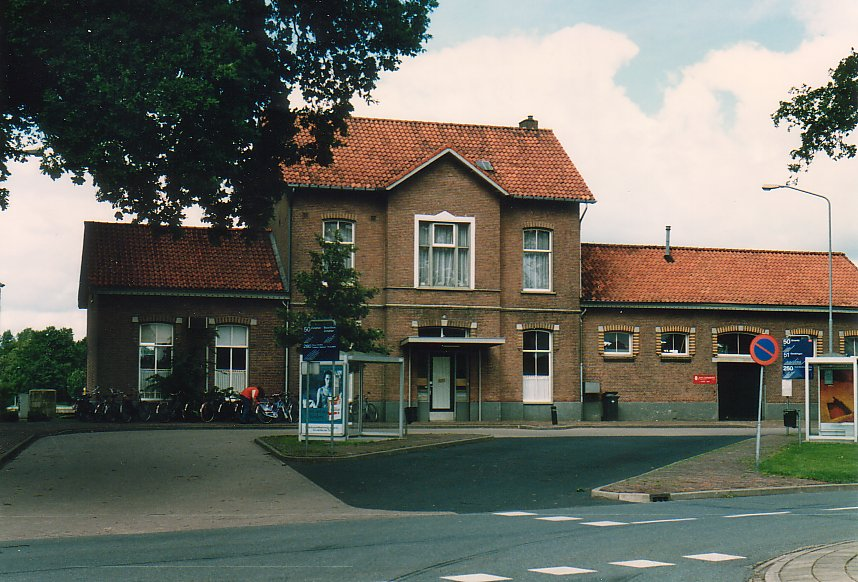
- Vorden railway station in 1996

General information
- Location: Netherlands
- Coordinates: 52°06′26″N 6°19′02″E
- Line: Zutphen–Winterswijk railway

History
- Opened: 1878

Services
| Preceding station | Arriva Netherlands | Following station |
|---|---|---|
| Zutphen Terminus | Stoptrein 30800 | Ruurlo towards Winterswijk |
Location
- Location within Netherlands

Vorden is a railway station in Vorden, Netherlands. The station opened on 24 June 1878 and is located on the Zutphen–Winterswijk railway. The train services are operated by Arriva.

== Train services ==
| Route | Service type | Operator | Notes |
|---|---|---|---|
| Zutphen - Winterswijk | Local ("Sprinter") | Arriva | 2x per hour (only 1x per hour after 20:00, on Saturday mornings and Sundays) |

=== Bus services ===
| Line | Route | Operator | Notes |
|---|---|---|---|
| 51 | Doetinchem - Velswijk - Keijenborg - Hengelo - Vorden | Arriva | |
| 80 | Zutphen Station - Zutphen Centrum (Downtown) - Zutphen Zuidwijken - Zutphen Gelre Ziekenhuizen (Hospitals) - Warnsveld - Vorden | Arriva | Not on evenings and weekends. |
| 193 | Zutphen - Warnsveld - Vierakker - Wichmond (- Vorden) | Arriva | On evenings, partly on Saturdays and Sundays (entirely), this bus only operates if called one hour before its supposed departure ("belbus") and only runs between Vorden and Zutphen, Gelre Ziekenhuizen. |
| 651 | Lochem → Vorden → Hengelo → Velswijk → Doetinchem | Berkhout Reizen | Only runs during morning rush hours; only one run halts in Vorden. |
