= Geleen Oost railway station =

Railway station in the Netherlands

Geleen Oost

General information
- Location: Netherlands
- Coordinates: 50°58′02″N 5°50′35″E
- Line: Sittard–Herzogenrath railway

History
- Opened: 1896

Services
Preceding station	Arriva Netherlands	Following station
Sittard Terminus	Stoptrein 32500	Spaubeek towards Kerkrade Centrum
Location
- Location within Netherlands

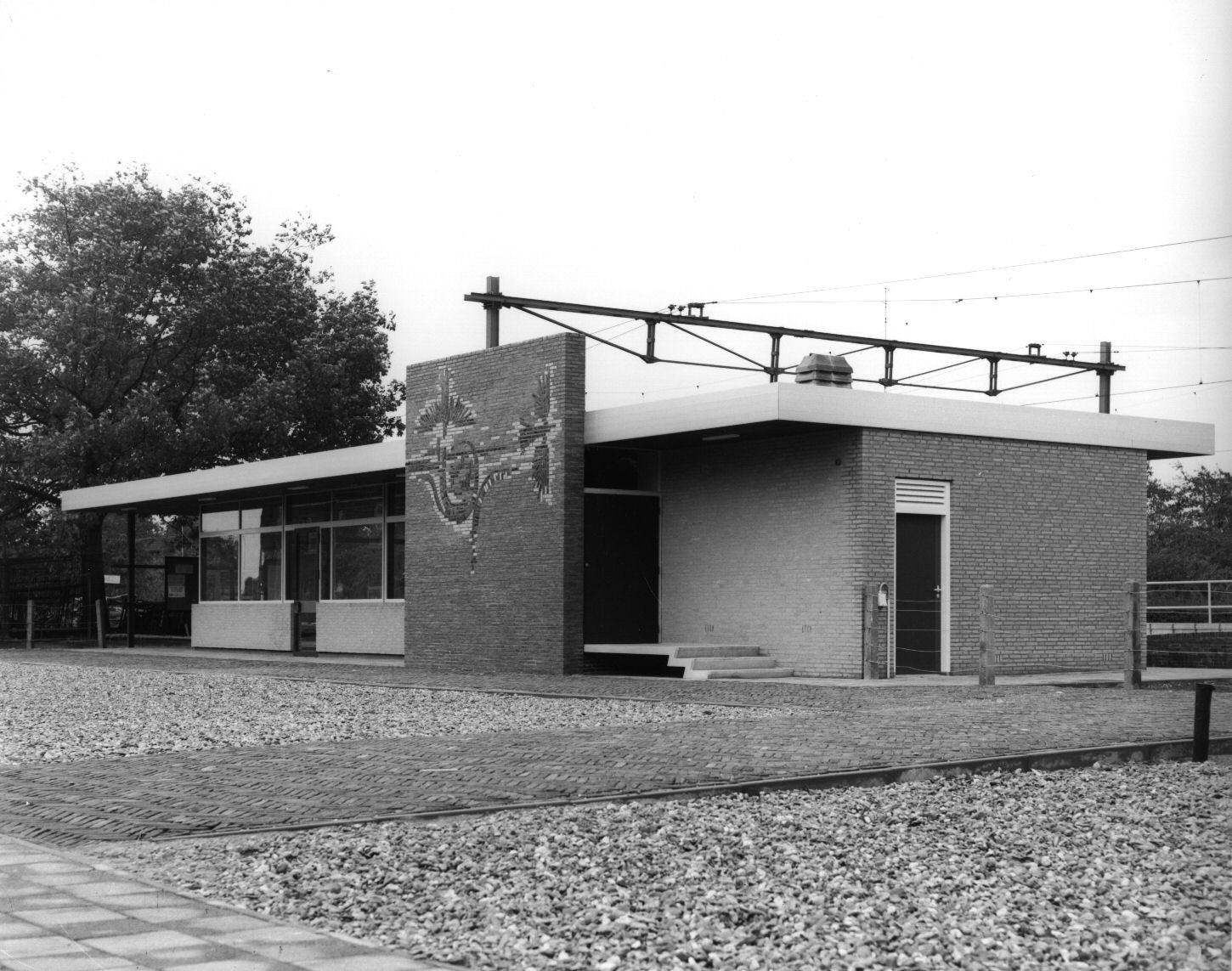
Geleen Oost train station, Geleen

Geleen Oost is a railway station located in Geleen, Netherlands. The station opened in 1896 and is located on the Sittard–Herzogenrath railway. The station is operated by Arriva. Until December 2006 the Haarlem–Heerlen Intercity service called at this station.

== Train services ==
The following local train services call at this station:

- Stoptrein: Sittard–Heerlen–Kerkrade
