= Echt railway station =

Railway station in the Netherlands

Echt
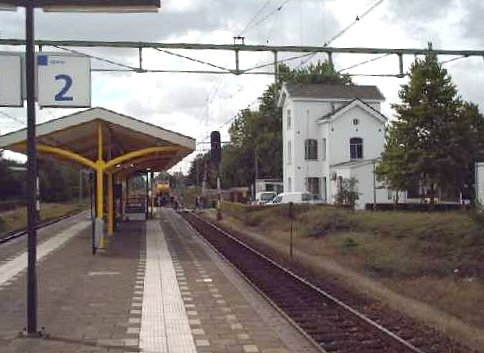

General information
- Location: Netherlands
- Coordinates: 51°06′00″N 5°52′43″E
- Line: Maastricht–Venlo railway

History
- Opened: 1862

Services
| Preceding station | Arriva Netherlands | Following station |
|---|---|---|
| Roermond Terminus | Stoptrein 32400 | Susteren towards Maastricht Randwyck |
Location
- Location within Netherlands

Echt is a railway station located in Echt, Netherlands. The station was opened in 1862 and is located on the Maastricht–Venlo railway. Train services is operated by Arriva.

== Train services ==
The following local train services call at this station:

- Stoptrein: Maastricht Randwyck–Sittard–Roermond
