= Sittard railway station =

Railway station in the Netherlands

Sittard
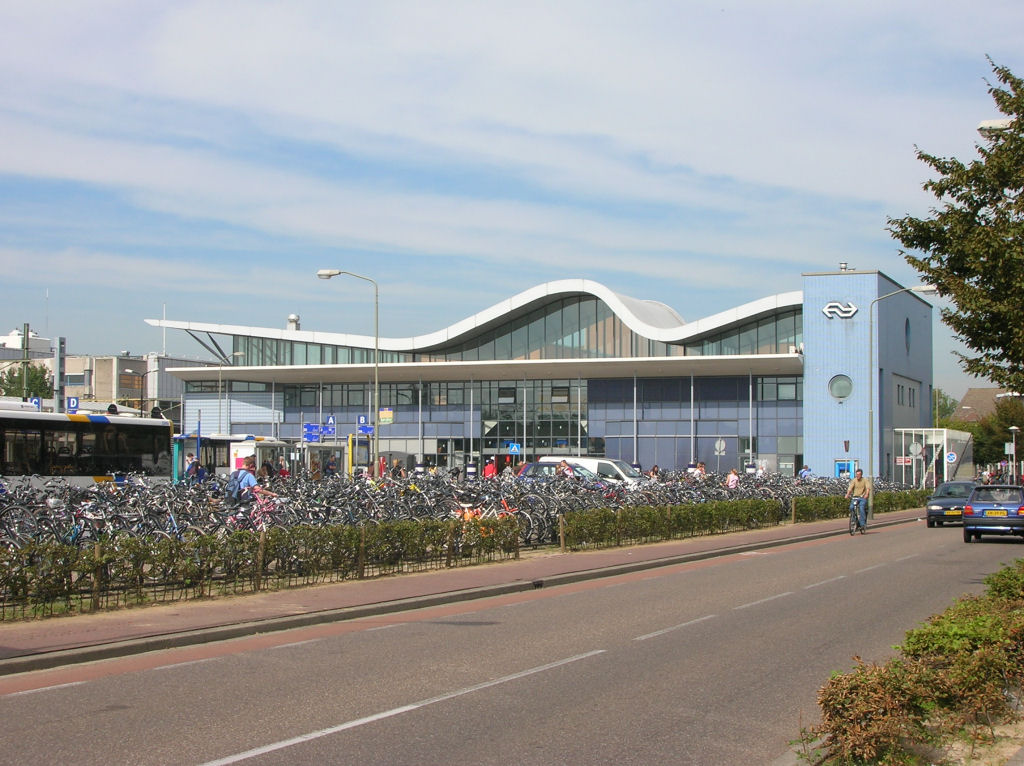

General information
- Location: Netherlands
- Coordinates: 51°00′04″N 5°51′30″E
- Lines: Sittard–Herzogenrath railway Maastricht–Venlo railway

History
- Opened: 1862

Services
Preceding station	Nederlandse Spoorwegen	Following station
Roermond towards Alkmaar	NS Intercity 2700 Mon-Thur until 19:00	Maastricht Terminus
Roermond towards Enkhuizen	NS Intercity 2900 After 19:00 and Fri-Sun only	Maastricht Terminus
Roermond towards Enkhuizen	NS Intercity 3900 Mon-Thur until 19:30	Heerlen Terminus
Roermond towards Eindhoven Centraal	NS Intercity 3900 After 19:30 and Fri-Sun	Heerlen Terminus
Preceding station	Arriva Netherlands	Following station
Susteren towards Roermond	Stoptrein 32400	Geleen-Lutterade towards Maastricht Randwyck
Terminus	Stoptrein 32500	Geleen Oost towards Kerkrade Centrum
Roermond towards Schiphol Airport	Nachttrein 32710 Friday night only	Maastricht Terminus
Location
- Location within Netherlands

Sittard is a railway station located in Sittard, Netherlands. The station was opened in 1862 and is located on the Maastricht–Venlo railway and the Sittard–Herzogenrath railway. Train services are operated by Nederlandse Spoorwegen and Arriva. All services from South Limburg to the north pass through Sittard.

Sittard has the longest railway platform in the Netherlands with a length of 700 metres.

== Train services ==
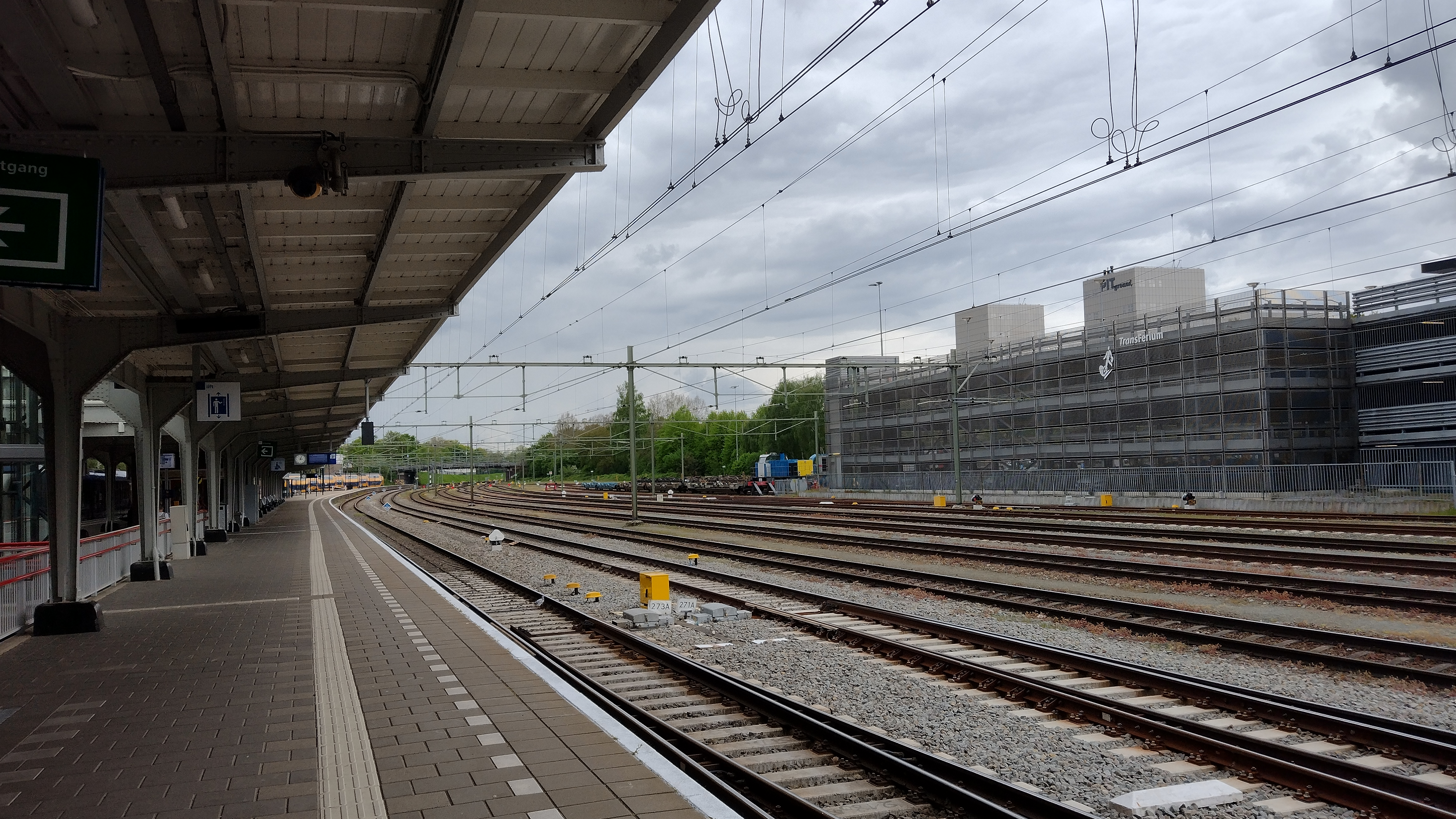
Platform

The following train services call at this station:

- Express services:
  - Intercity: (Schagen–)Alkmaar–Amsterdam–Utrecht–Eindhoven–Maastricht
  - Intercity: Enkhuizen–Amsterdam–Utrecht–Eindhoven–Maastricht
  - Intercity: Enkhuizen–Amsterdam–Utrecht–Eindhoven–Heerlen
- Local services:
  - Stoptrein: Sittard–Heerlen–Kerkrade
  - Stoptrein: Roermond–Sittard–Maastricht Randwyck
