= Roermond railway station =

Railway station in the Netherlands

Roermond
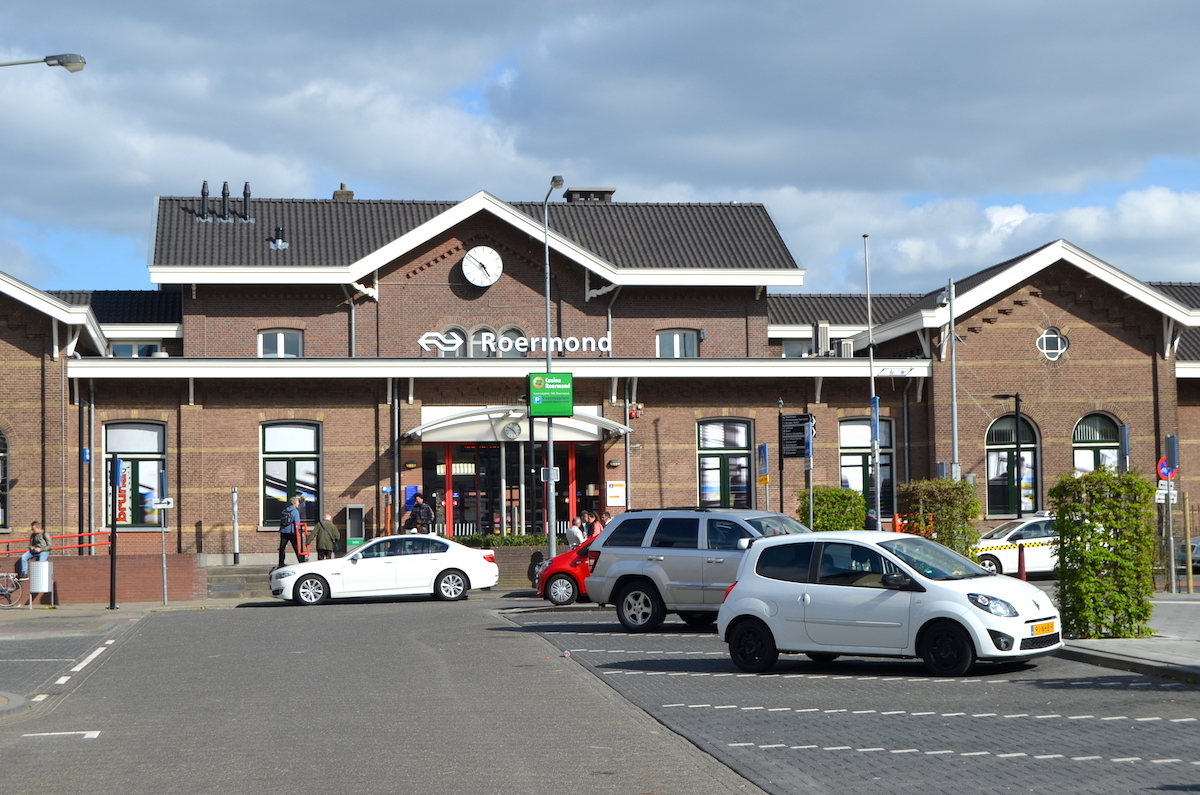

General information
- Location: Netherlands
- Coordinates: 51°11′36″N 5°59′41″E
- Lines: Maastricht–Venlo railway Weert–Roermond railway

History
- Opened: 1865

Services
Preceding station	Nederlandse Spoorwegen	Following station
Weert towards Alkmaar	NS Intercity 2700 Mon-Thur until 19:00	Sittard towards Maastricht
Weert towards Enkhuizen	NS Intercity 2900 After 19:00 and Fri-Sun only	Sittard towards Maastricht
Weert towards Enkhuizen	NS Intercity 3900 Mon-Thur until 19:30	Sittard towards Heerlen
Weert towards Eindhoven Centraal	NS Intercity 3900 After 19:30 and Fri-Sun	Sittard towards Heerlen
Preceding station	Arriva Netherlands	Following station
Swalmen towards Nijmegen	Stoptrein 32200	Terminus
Terminus	Stoptrein 32400	Echt towards Maastricht Randwyck
Weert towards Schiphol Airport	Nachttrein 32710 Friday night only	Sittard towards Maastricht
Location
- Location within Netherlands

Roermond is a railway station located in Roermond, Netherlands. The station was opened on 21 November 1865 and is located on the Maastricht–Venlo railway and the Weert–Roermond railway. Train services are operated by Nederlandse Spoorwegen and Arriva. The station is the second-busiest in Limburg.

== Train services ==
The following train services call at this station:

- Express services:
  - Intercity: (Schagen–)Alkmaar–Amsterdam–Utrecht–Eindhoven–Maastricht
  - Intercity: Enkhuizen–Amsterdam–Utrecht–Eindhoven–Maastricht
  - Intercity: Enkhuizen–Amsterdam–Utrecht–Eindhoven–Heerlen
- Local services:
  - Stoptrein: Roermond–Sittard–Maastricht Randwyck
  - Stoptrein: Nijmegen–Venlo–Roermond
