= Maastricht–Venlo railway =

Railway line in the Netherlands

Overview
- Status: Operational
- Locale: The Netherlands
- Termini: Maastricht railway station; Venlo railway station

Service
- Operator(s): Nederlandse Spoorwegen

History
- Opened: 1865

Technical
- Line length: 70 km (43 mi)
- Number of tracks: double track (Maastricht–Roermond), single track (Roermond–Venlo)
- Track gauge: 1,435 mm (4 ft 8 1/2 in) standard gauge
- Electrification: 1.5 kV DC

The Maastricht–Venlo railway is a railway line in the Netherlands running from Maastricht to Venlo, passing through Sittard and Roermond. The line opened in 1865. It is part of the Staatslijn "E".

== Stations ==
The main interchange stations on the Maastricht–Venlo railway are:

- Maastricht: to Liège and Heerlen
- Sittard: to Heerlen
- Roermond: to Eindhoven
- Venlo: to Eindhoven, Düsseldorf and Nijmegen
