= Vrouwenheide =

Hill in the Netherlands

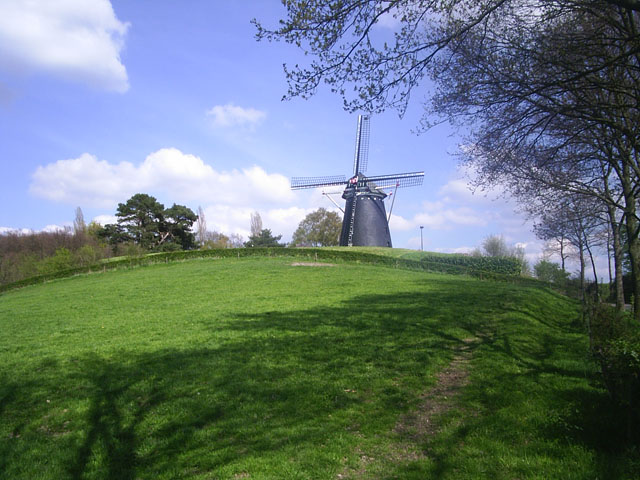
- Windmill Op de Vrouweheide

Highest point
- Elevation: 218 m (715 ft)
- Coordinates: 50°50′40″N 5°57′0.3″E

Naming
- English translation: Women's heath
- Language of name: English

Geography
- Location within Netherlands
- Location: Limburg, Netherlands

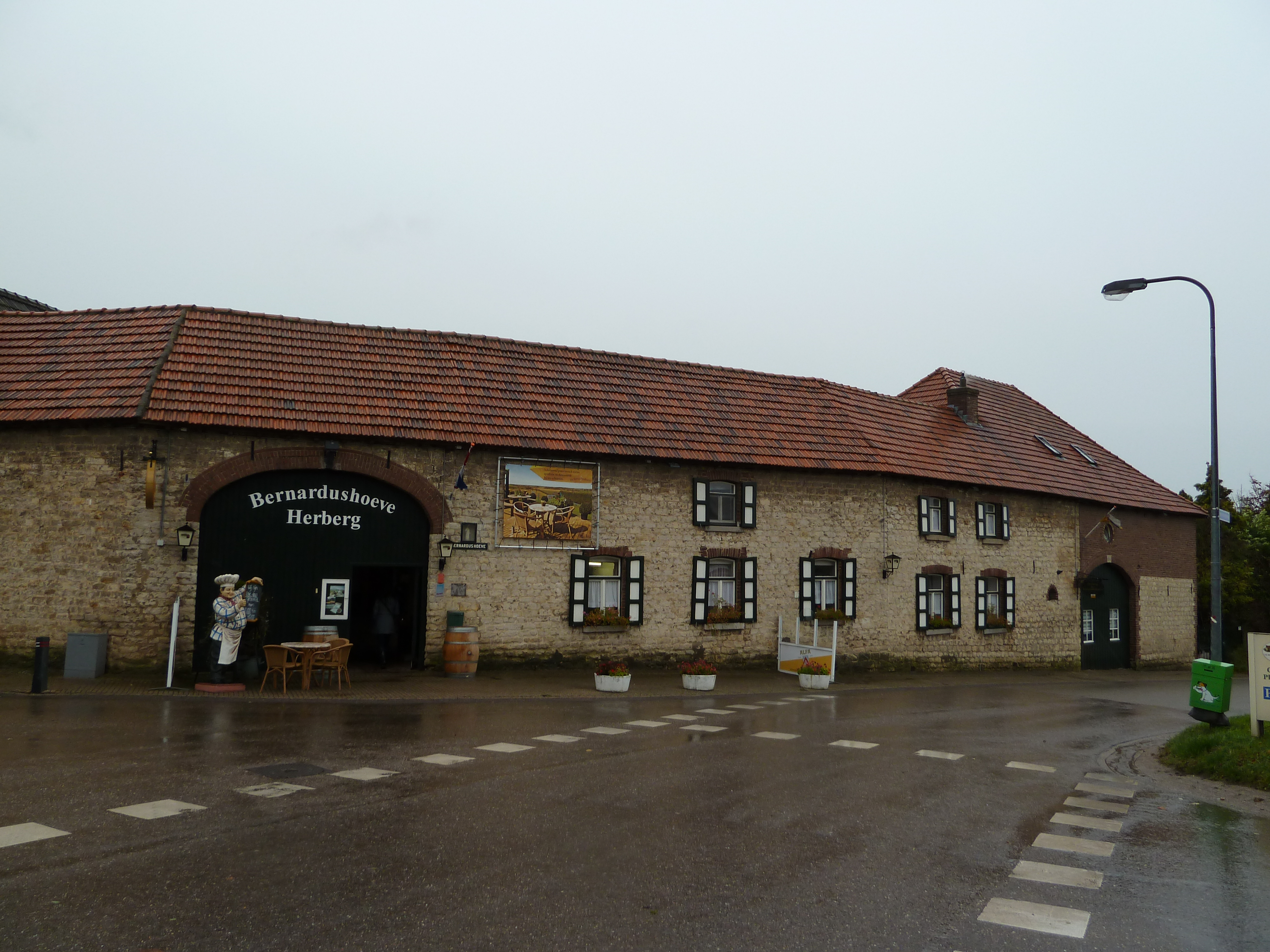
Monumental Bernardushoeve

The Vrouwenheide (Women's heath) is a hill in the Netherlands and former heath land, just south of Ubachsberg in the municipality of Voerendaal. With a height of 218 metres above NAP it is one of the highest points in the European part of the Netherlands.

== Geology ==
The area is made up out of inliers and outliers. The Vrouwenheide is the highest point of the plateau of Ubachsberg. Between 1 and 2 million years ago it was part of the island of Ubachsberg in the Meuse river.

With a height of 218 metres above NAP it is one of the highest point in the European part of the Netherlands. It was long believed that this was in fact the highest point in the Netherlands, because from the top you can see over the top of the Vaalserberg, to see the even higher hills from the German Eifel.

== Buildings ==
On the Vrouwenheide are several national monuments. Windmill Op de Vrouweheide, built in 1858, is located at 216 meters above Amsterdam Ordnance Datum, and built on an artificial hill to catch even more wind. As such it is the highest windmill in the Netherlands. The Bernardushoeve is a farmhouse built in the early 19th century and currently a restaurant. In the forest on the Vrouwenheide the remains of an old watchtower can be found.

== Activities ==
The Vrouwenheide has a lot of walking routes and biking routes pass through and is also home to a farmer's golf course. The Vrouwenheide is part of the Mergellandroute, a tourist route for cars and bikes through South Limburg, Netherlands, mapped out by the ANWB. Due to the hills, the Vrouwenheide and surrounding areas are part of the Amstel Gold Race, a road bicycle race. As such it was also part of the 2006 Tour de France (stage 3).

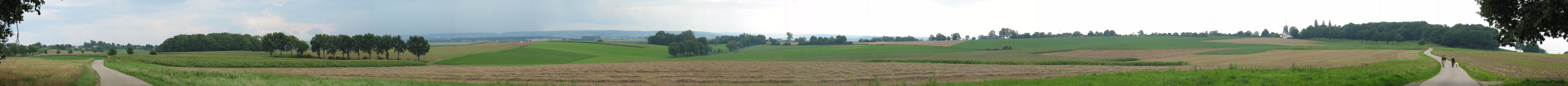
Panorama of the Vrouwenheide
