= Op de Vrouweheide =

- On the Vrouweheide
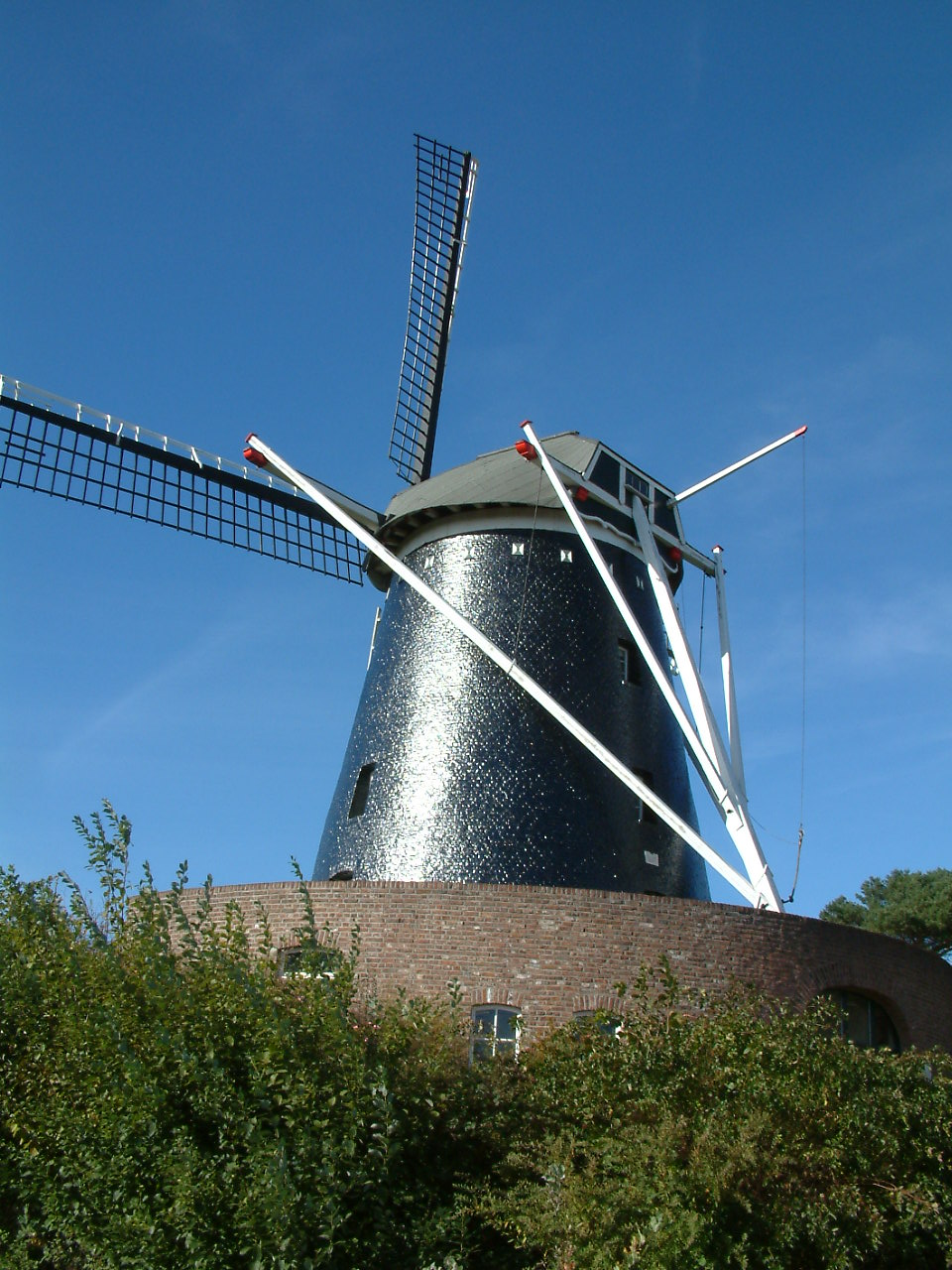
- Op de Vrouweheide in 2008

General information
- Status: Rijksmonument (37893)
- Type: Windmill
- Location: Vrouwenheide 1; 6367 JZ, Voerendaal, Voerendaal, Netherlands
- Coordinates: 50.844933°N 5.951136°E
- Completed: 1858
- Designations: Gristmill (1858–1925); Restaurant (1975–1980); House (1980–present)

References
- Database of Mills; De Hollandsche Molen

Op de Vrouweheide (English: On the Vrouweheide) is a windmill located on the Vrouwenheide just south of Ubachsberg, Voerendaal, in the Dutch province of Limburg. Built in 1858 as a tower mill on an artificial hill, the windmill functioned as a gristmill. The mill is a national monument (nr 37893) since 17 January 1967.

== History ==
Built in 1858, the windmill functioned as a gristmill until 1925, after which it fell into disrepair. The internal machinery was removed in 1950, and in 1958, the exterior was restored to function as a standstill monument. The mill was restored in 1975 to function as a restaurant. It was turned into a living space in 1980. The mill was again restored in 1989 bringing the exterior back to its original state, with the sails in working order. The mill is currently privately owned and functions as housing.

== Gallery of images ==
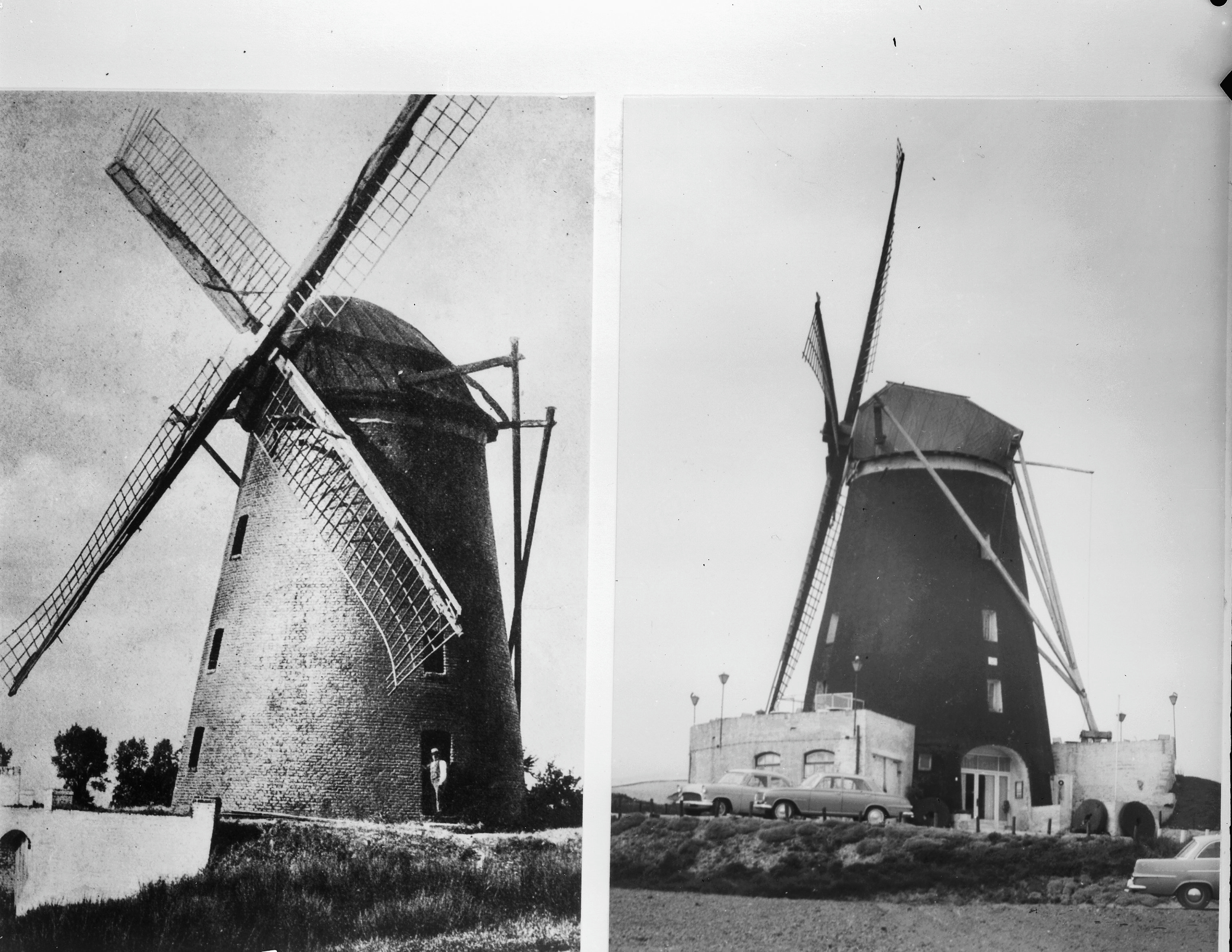
Pre- and post 1975 mill

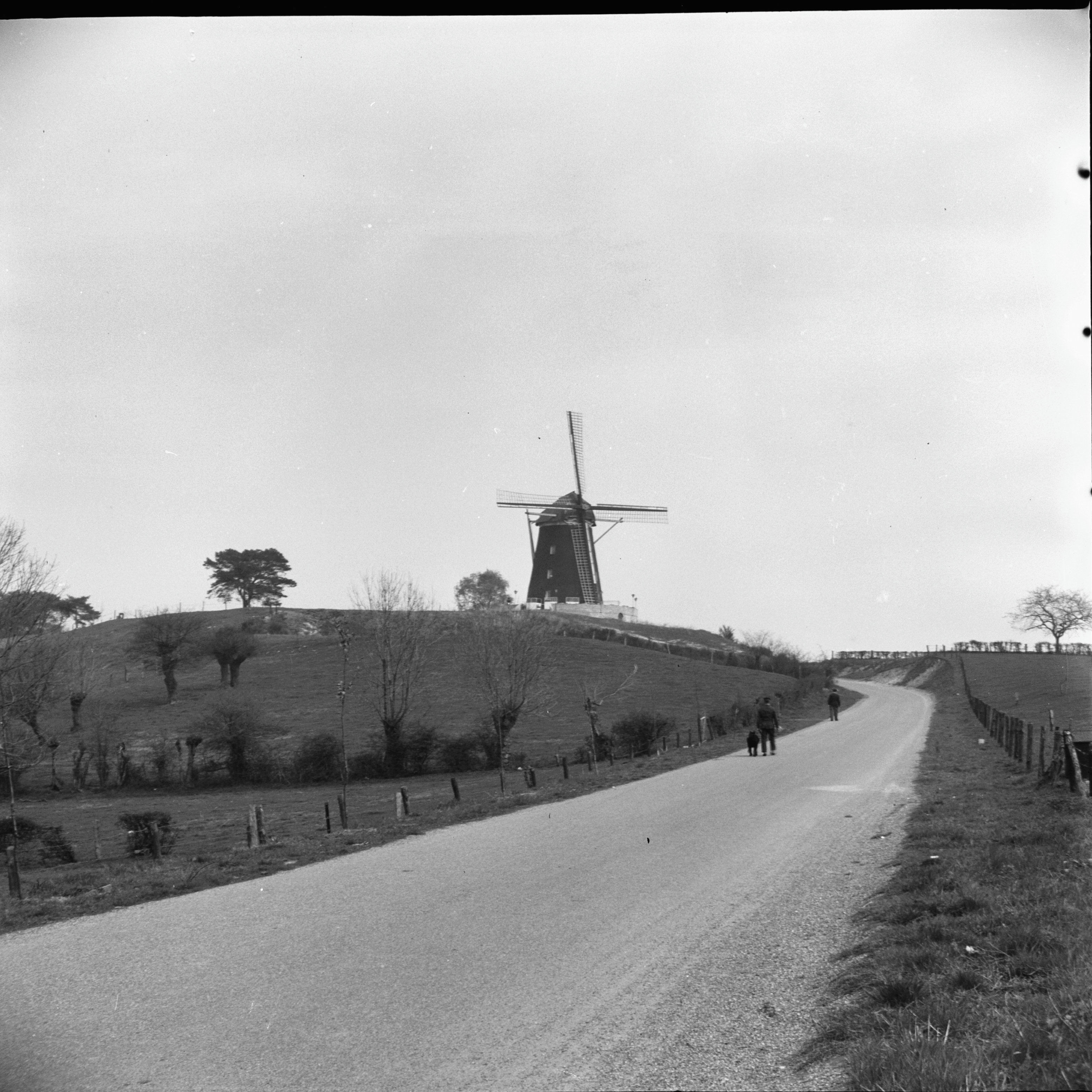
The mill and surrounding area

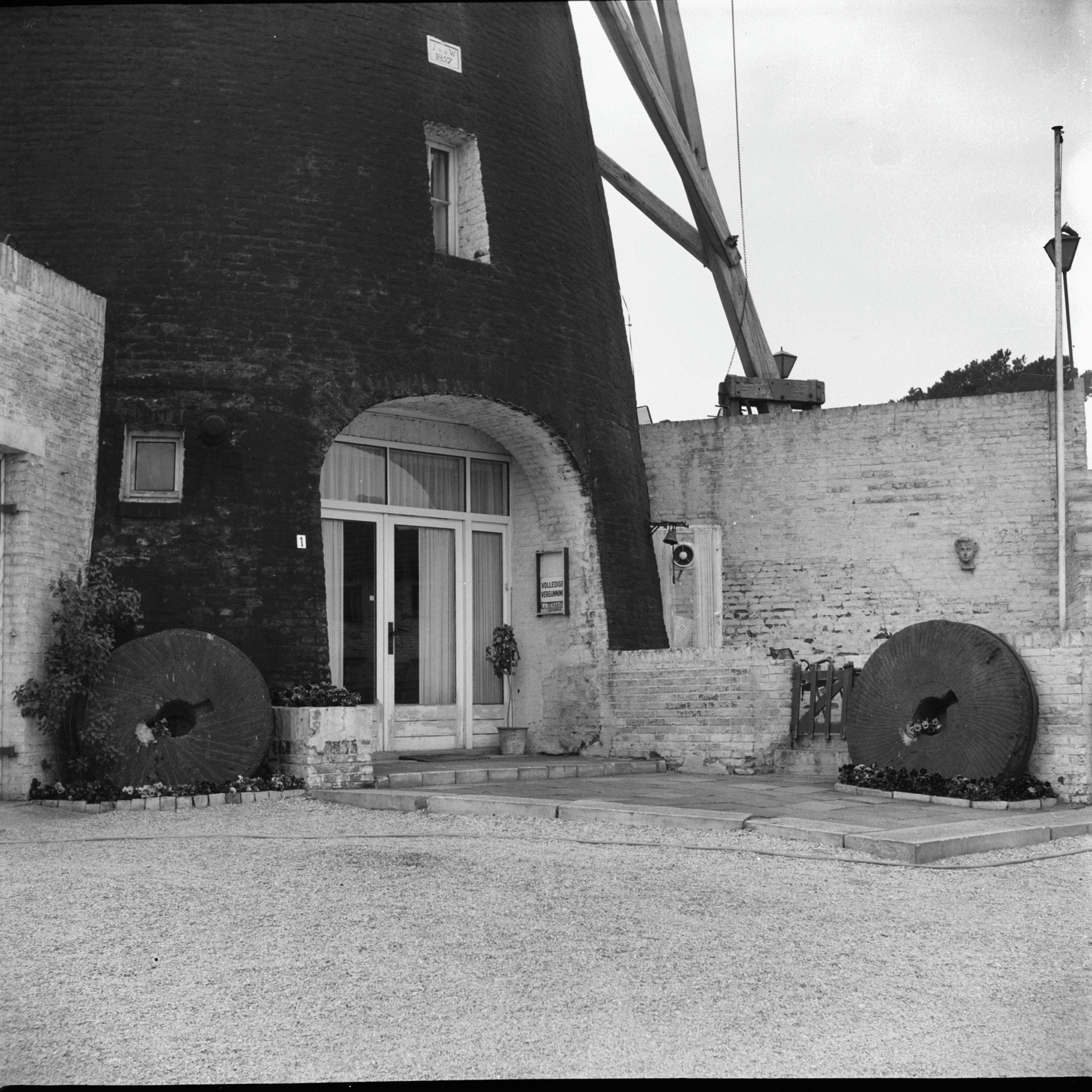
New entrance

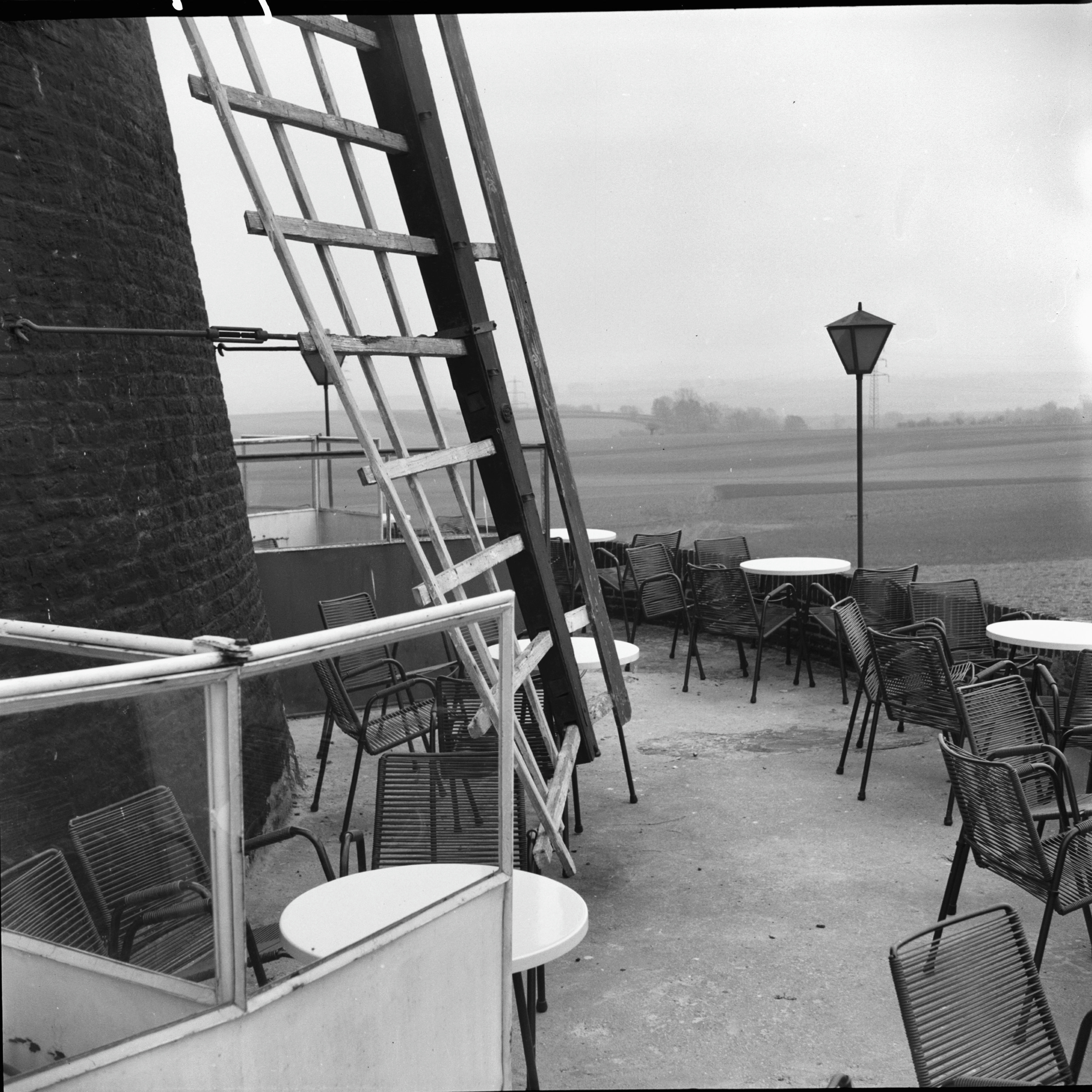
Terrace on the mill

== Trivia ==
- Located 216 meters above Amsterdam Ordnance Datum, it is the highest windmill in the Netherlands.
- Although the windmill was built in 1858, the building itself indicates it was built in 1857.
