= Saint Bernard Church (Ubachsberg) =

- Sint-Bernarduskerk
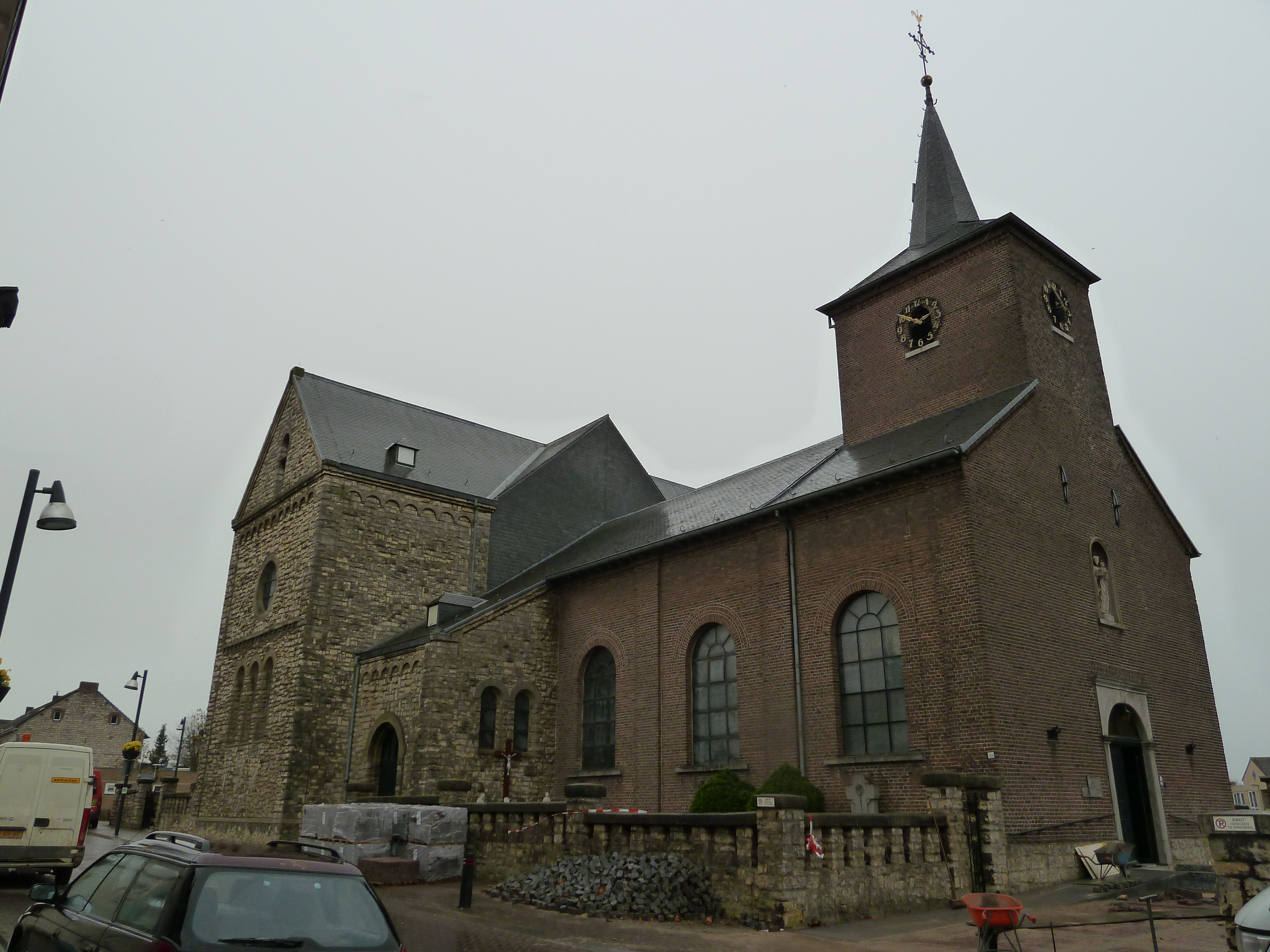
- Saint Bernard Church
- 50.852881°N 5.947556°E
- Location: Ubachsberg
- Country: Netherlands
- Denomination: Roman Catholic
- Website: parochiesimpelveld.nl

History
- Status: Rijksmonument (37900)
- Founded: 1841

Architecture
- Functional status: Catholic church
- Architect: Jean Dumoulin

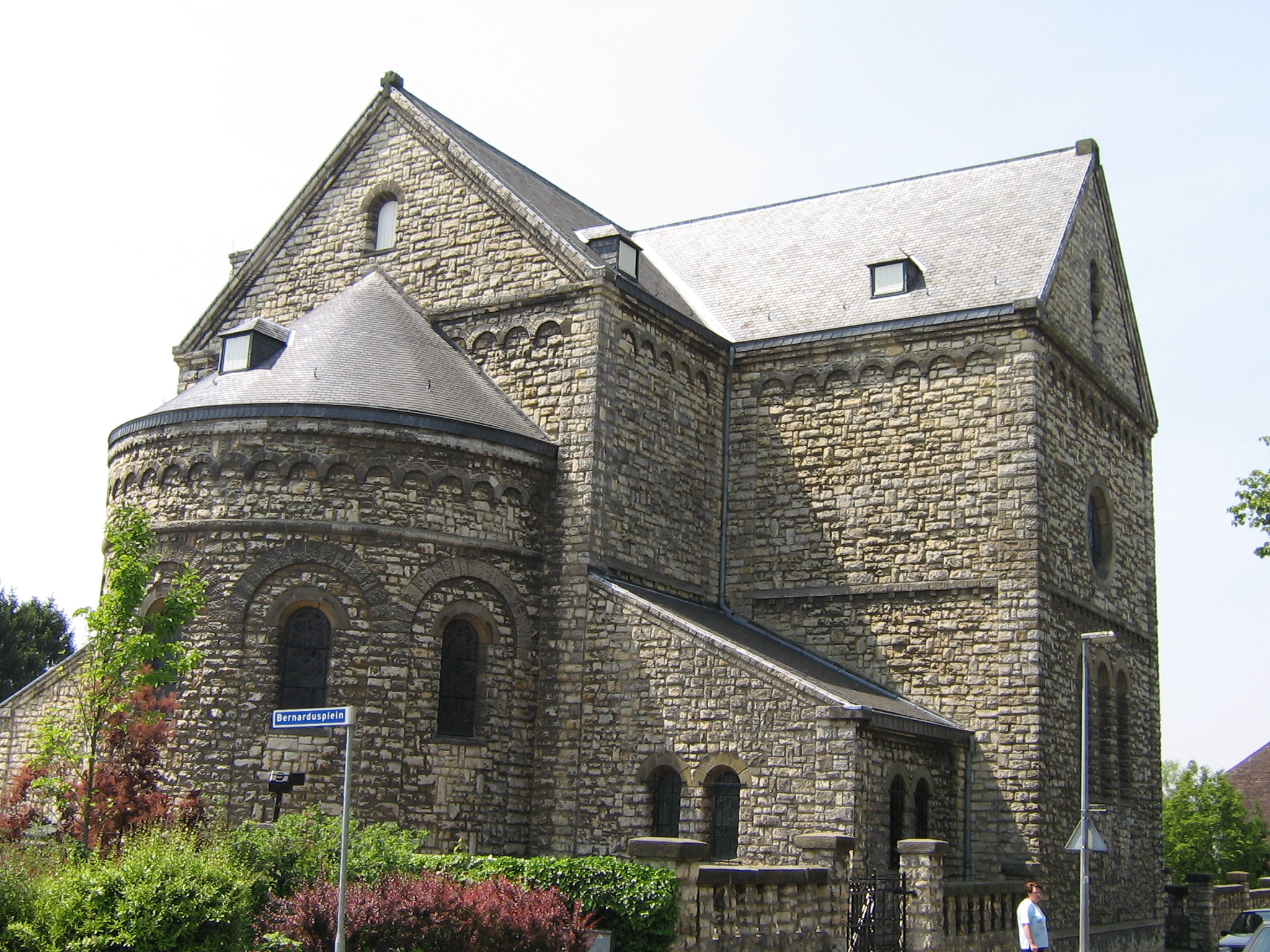
Saint Bernard Church

The Saint Bernard Church (Dutch: Sint-Bernarduskerk) is a Roman Catholic church building in Ubachsberg, Voerendaal, Netherlands. Patron saint for the church is Bernard of Clairvaux. The church is a national monument of the Netherlands.

== Building ==
The church is located southwest of the main road through the village of Ubachsberg, the Kerkstraat, which connects Huls in the east, with Voerendaal in the north-west. South of the church is the Bernardussquare. East and south of the church is the cemetery. The building consists of a build in bell tower in the west, a nave with a single aisle, a transept and a choir. The church is partially made up out of red bricks and partially out of Kunradersteen, a local variant of chalk.

== History ==
The nave and tower were built in 1841 to a design by Jean Dumoulin. That same year Ubachsberg became an independent parish. Before this time Ubachsberg was part of the parish of St. Laurentius in Voerendaal.

In 1924 the church was expanded to a design by architect Beursgens from Sittard. A transept and a choir in Neo-Roman style were added.

== Rijksmonument ==
The church has been listed as a rijksmonument since 8 January 1969, making it a national heritage site of the Netherlands.
