= Weustenrade =

- Hamlet
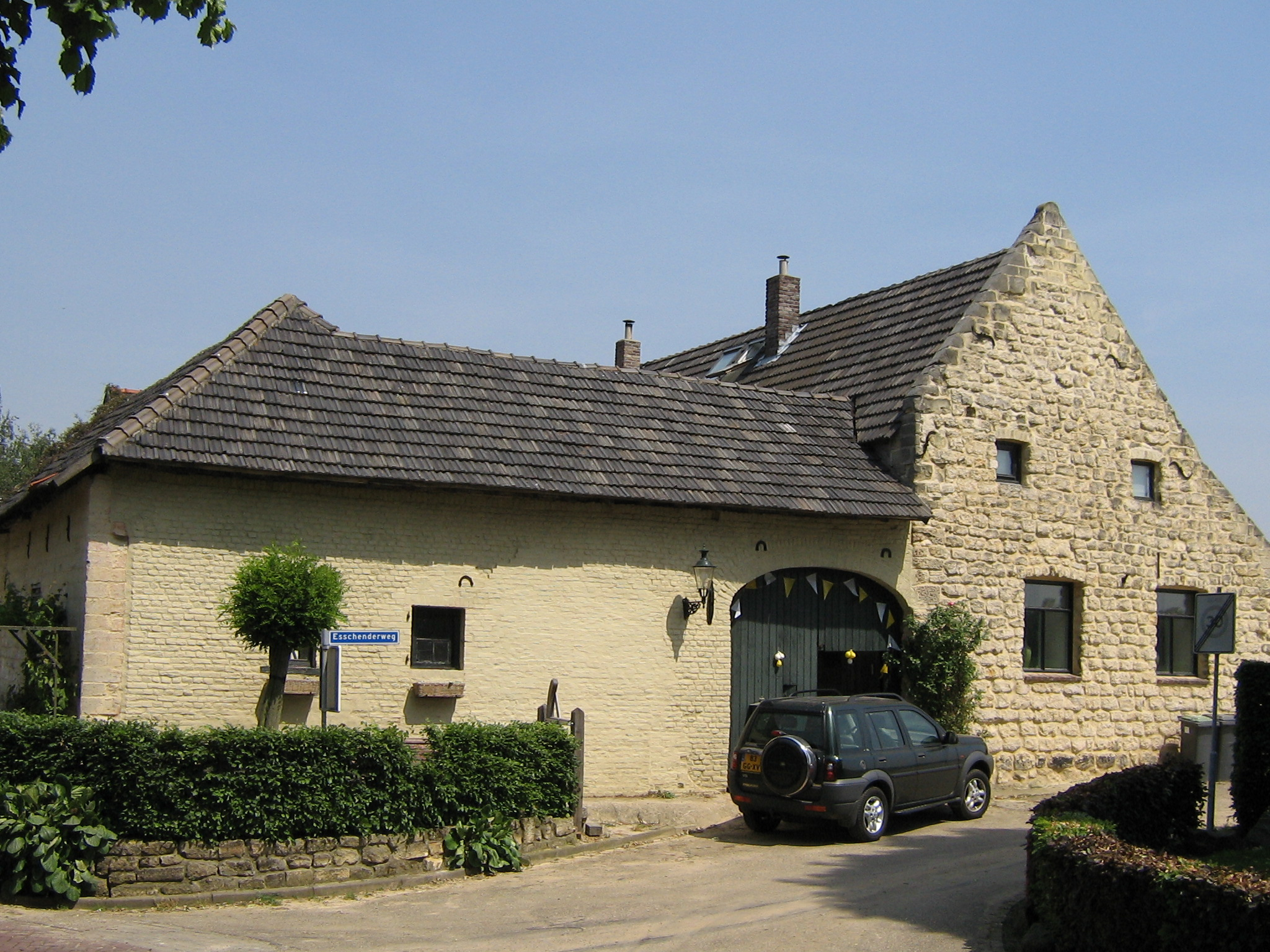
- Farm in Weustenrade

- Location in the Netherlands Location in the province of Limburg in the Netherlands
- Coordinates: 50°54′N 5°55′E
- Country: Netherlands
- Province: Limburg
- Municipality: Voerendaal

Area
  - Total: 0.12 km^{2} (0.046 sq mi)
- Elevation: 134 m (440 ft)

Population (2021)
  - Total: 230
  - Density: 1,900/km^{2} (5,000/sq mi)
- Time zone: UTC+1 (CET)
  - Summer (DST): UTC+2 (CEST)
- Postal code: 6343
- Dialing code: 045

Weustenrade is a hamlet in the municipality of Voerendaal of the province Limburg, Netherlands. It is located near Hoensbroek, Voerendaal and Klimmen.

The village was first mentioned in 1420 as Woestenroede, and means "desolate cultivated forest". It was home to 105 people in 1840.

There are still several old seventeenth-century houses, among which the 'oliemolen' (oilmill).
