= Heerlen Woonboulevard railway station =

Railway station in the Netherlands

Heerlen Woonboulevard
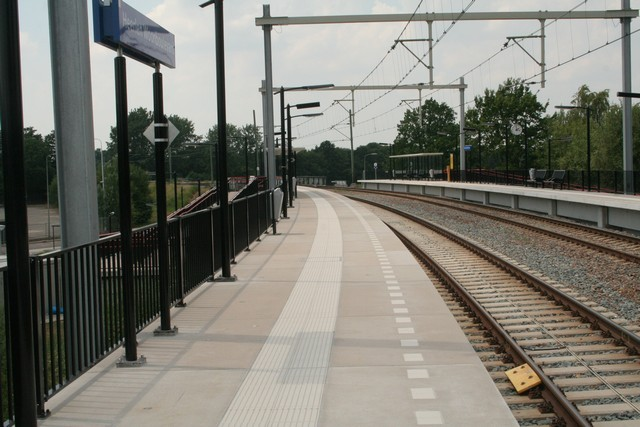

General information
- Location: Netherlands
- Coordinates: 50°53′46″N 5°57′10″E
- Line: Heerlen–Schin op Geul railway
- Platforms: 2

Other information
- Station code: Hrlw

History
- Opened: 27 June 2010

Services
Preceding station	Arriva Netherlands	Following station
Voerendaal towards Maastricht Randwyck	Stoptrein 32000	Heerlen Terminus
Location
- Location within Netherlands

Heerlen Woonboulevard (Dutch pronunciation: [ˌɦeːrlə(ɱ) ˈʋoːmbuləˌvaːr]) is a railway station in Heerlen, Netherlands.

== History ==
Construction took place in 2010, between 18 January and 3 June, while the station opened on 27 June. The station lies between Voerendaal and Heerlen on the Heerlen–Schin op Geul railway, which is part of the Heuvellandlijn (Maastricht–Heerlen–Kerkrade).

The station was named after the adjacent Woonboulevard Heerlen, a collection of furniture and home decoration shops.

== Train services ==
The following local train services call at this station:

- Stoptrein S4: Maastricht–Heerlen
