= Klimmen-Ransdaal railway station =

Historic Dutch railway station

Klimmen-Ransdaal
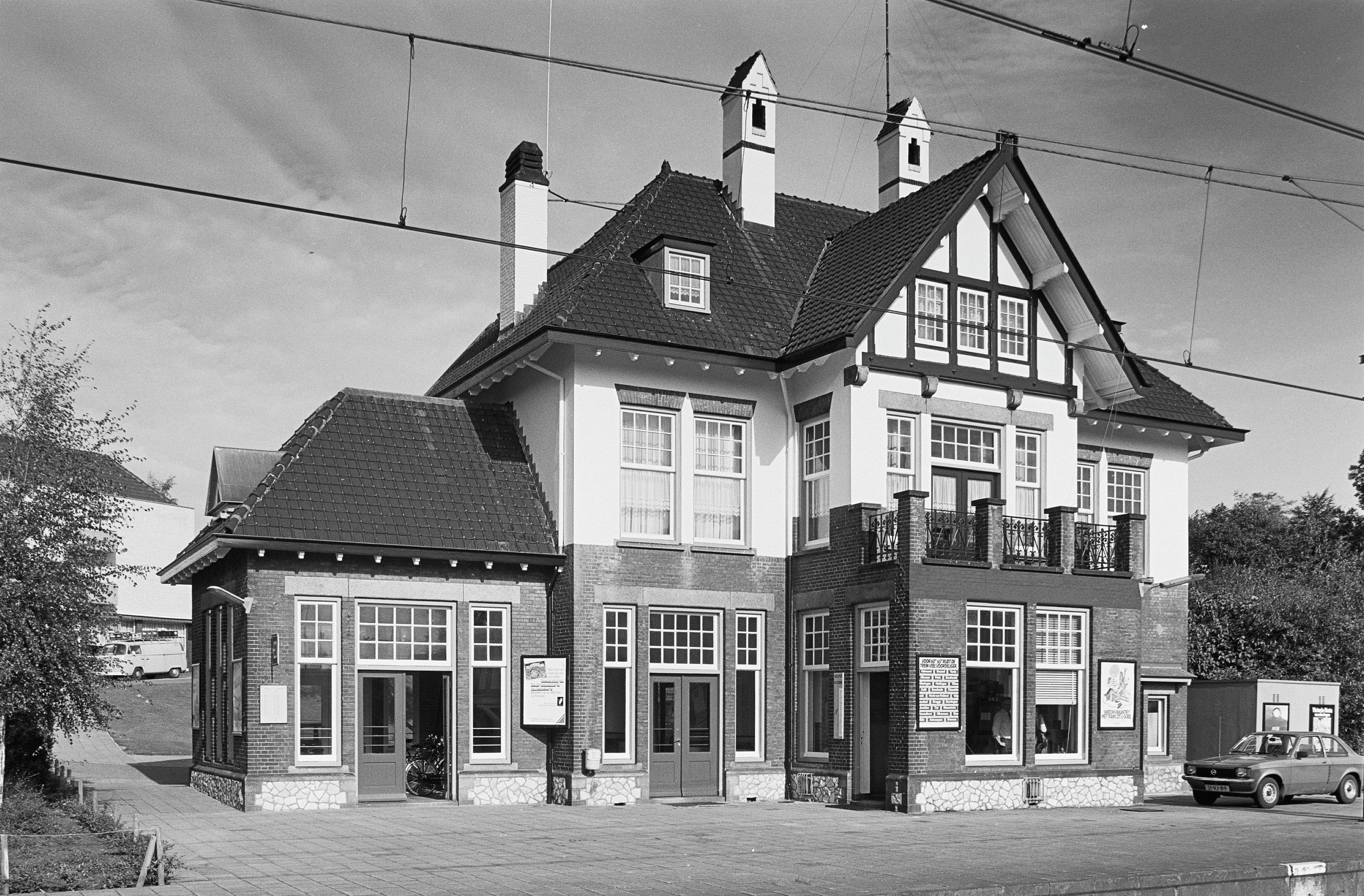

General information
- Location: Mareheiweg 2, Klimmen; Netherlands
- Coordinates: 50°52′00″N 5°53′26″E
- Line: Heerlen–Schin op Geul railway
- Platforms: 2

Other information
- Station code: Kmr

History
- Opened: 1 March 1915

Services
| Preceding station | Arriva Netherlands | Following station |
|---|---|---|
| Schin op Geul towards Maastricht Randwyck | Stoptrein 32000 | Voerendaal towards Heerlen |
Location
- Location within Netherlands

Klimmen-Ransdaal railway station is located between the villages of Klimmen and Ransdaal in the municipality of Voerendaal, Netherlands. The station was designed in the traditionalist style by George van Heukelom and built in 1913 on the Heerlen–Schin op Geul railway. The station opened on 1 March 1915.

It became national heritage site #507162 on 11 November 1998.

== Train services ==
Klimmen-Ransdaal station is served by Arriva with the following local train services:

- Stoptrein S4: Maastricht–Heerlen
