= Schin op Geul railway station =

Railway station in the Netherlands

Schin op Geul
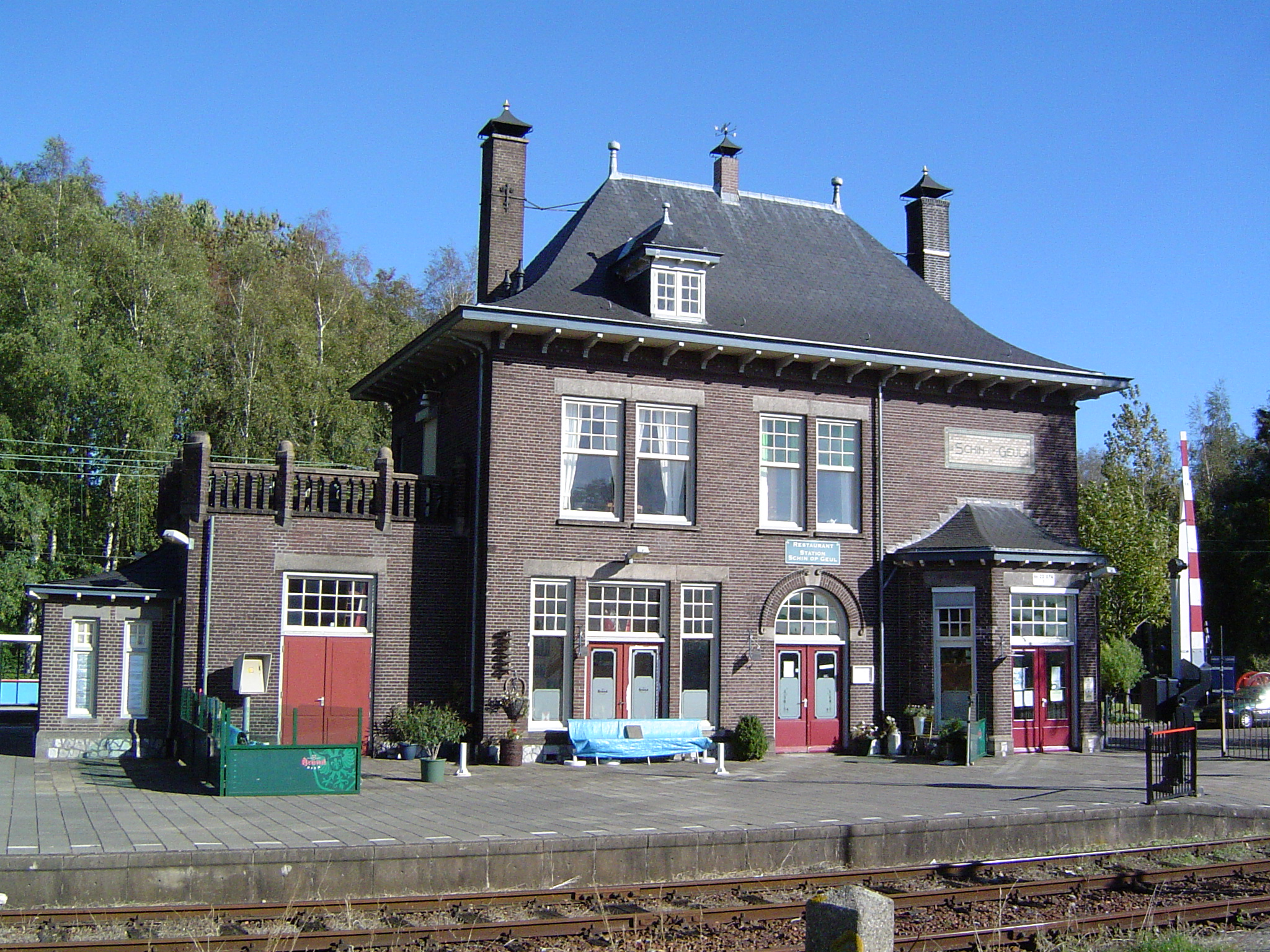
- The station building, dating from 1913

General information
- Location: Baanweg 1, Schin op Geul; Netherlands
- Coordinates: 50°51′22″N 5°52′18″E
- Lines: Maastricht–Aachen railway Heerlen–Schin op Geul railway
- Platforms: 3

Other information
- Station code: Sog

History
- Opened: 23 October 1853

Services
Preceding station	Arriva Netherlands	Following station
Valkenburg towards Maastricht Randwyck	Stoptrein 32000	Klimmen-Ransdaal towards Heerlen
Location
- Location within Netherlands

Schin op Geul railway station is located in Schin op Geul, Netherlands. The station opened on 23 October 1853 on the Maastricht–Aachen railway. In 1914, Schin op Geul became one end of a Heerlen–Schin op Geul railway.

The station building is used as a restaurant as well as a waiting area.

== Train services ==
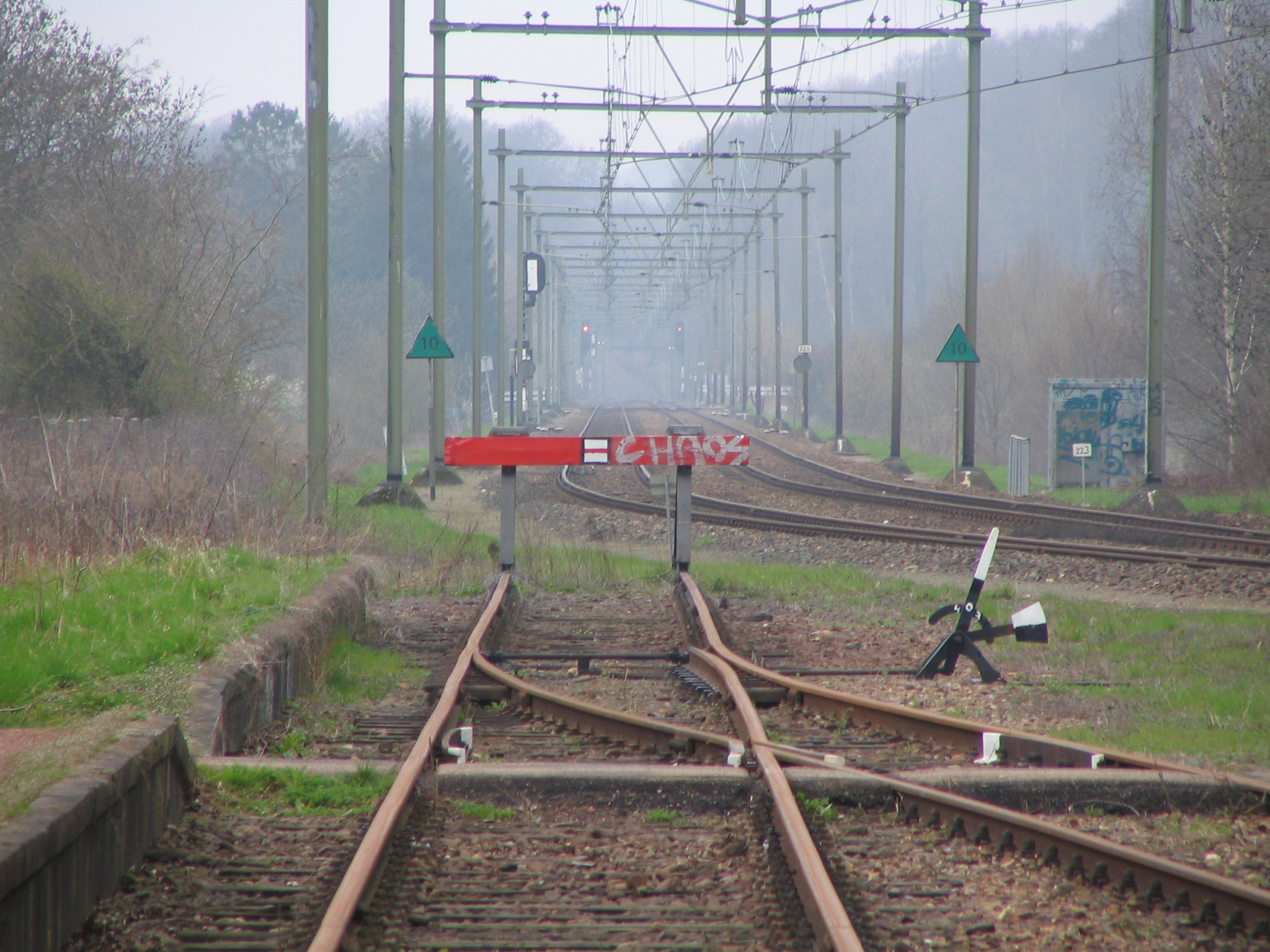
Between 1992 and 2007 the railway to Aachen was disconnected from the railway between Maastricht and Heerlen

Schin op Geul station is served by Arriva with the following train services:

- Stoptrein RS18: Maastricht–Heerlen

Schin op Geul is the western terminus of the heritage railway to Aachen. That line is exploited by the Zuid-Limburgse Stoomtrein Maatschappij.
