= De Leuf =

Coordinates: 50°51′9.05″N 5°57′8.04″E

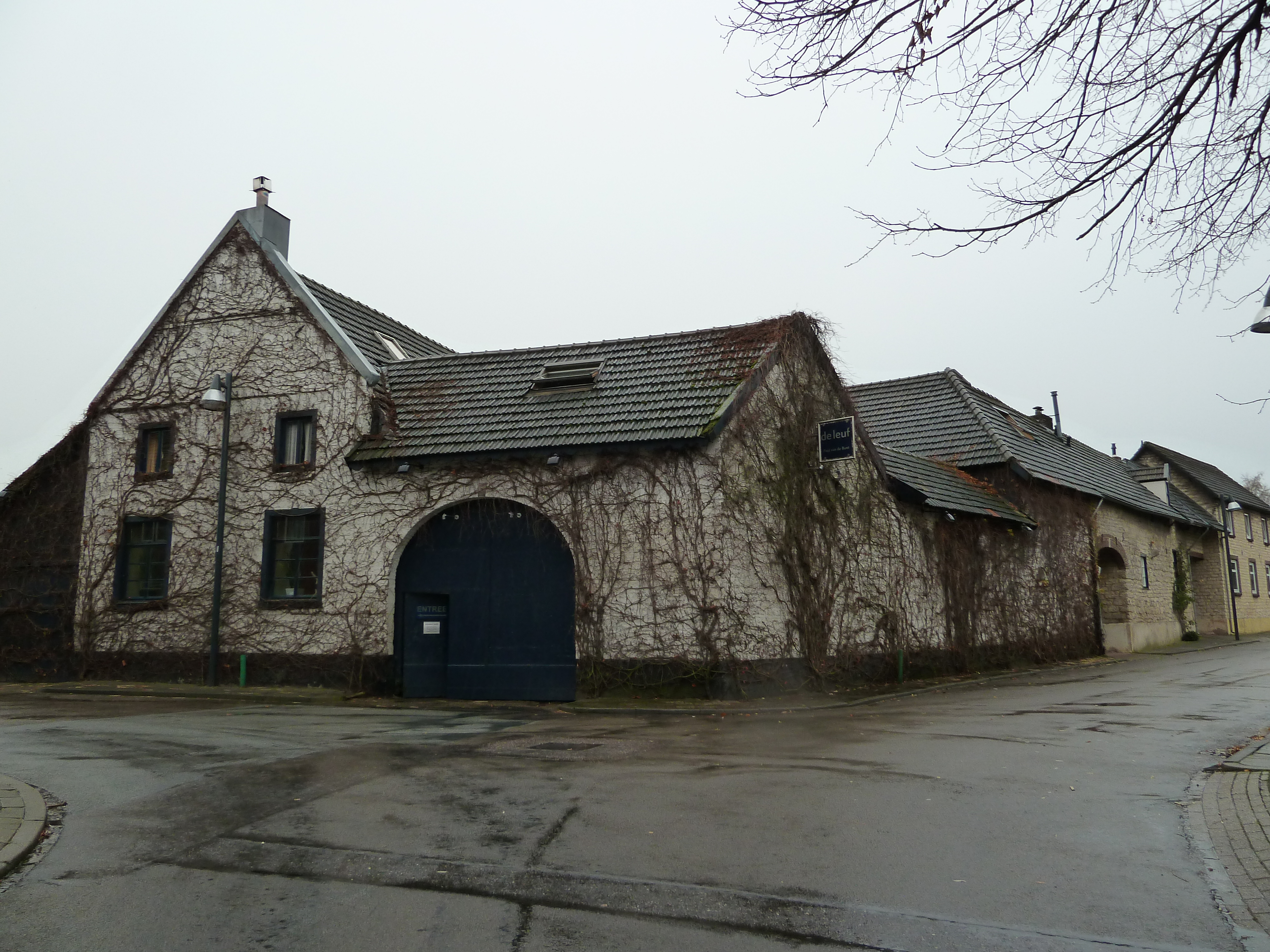
- A picture of De Leuf restaurant
- Interactive map of De Leuf

Restaurant information
- Head chef: Paul van de Bunt
- Food type: French / International
- Rating: Michelin Guide
- Location: Dalstraat 2, Ubachsberg, 6367 JS, Netherlands
- Seating capacity: 45
- Website: Official website

De Leuf is a restaurant located in Ubachsberg, Limburg in the Netherlands. It is a fine dining restaurant that was awarded one or two Michelin stars in the period 1996 to present. GaultMillau awarded the restaurant 18.0 point. (Out of 20)

Head chef of De Leuf is Paul van de Bunt. De Leuf is a member of Alliance Gastronomique Néerlandaise.

The restaurant is located in a farmhouse, that was originally built in 1759.

== Star history ==
1996-2007: one star
2008-2012: two stars

== See also ==
- List of Michelin starred restaurants in the Netherlands
