= Voerendaal railway station =

Railway station in the Netherlands

Voerendaal
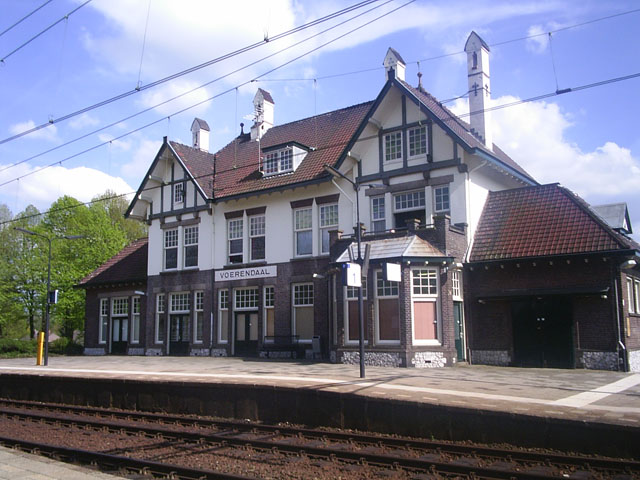

General information
- Location: Jeustraat 77, Voerendaal; Netherlands
- Coordinates: 50°53′12″N 5°55′46″E
- Line: Heerlen–Schin op Geul railway

Other information
- Station code: Vdl

History
- Opened: 1915

Services
Preceding station	Arriva Netherlands	Following station
Klimmen-Ransdaal towards Maastricht Randwyck	Stoptrein 32000	Heerlen Woonboulevard towards Heerlen
Location
- Location within Netherlands

Voerendaal railway station is located in Voerendaal, Netherlands and is served by Arriva. The station was designed in the traditionalist style by George van Heukelom and built in 1913 on the Heerlen–Schin op Geul railway. It became national heritage site #507164 on 27 March 1997.

== Train service ==
The following local train services call at this station:

- Stoptrein S4: Maastricht–Heerlen
