= Klimmen =

- Village
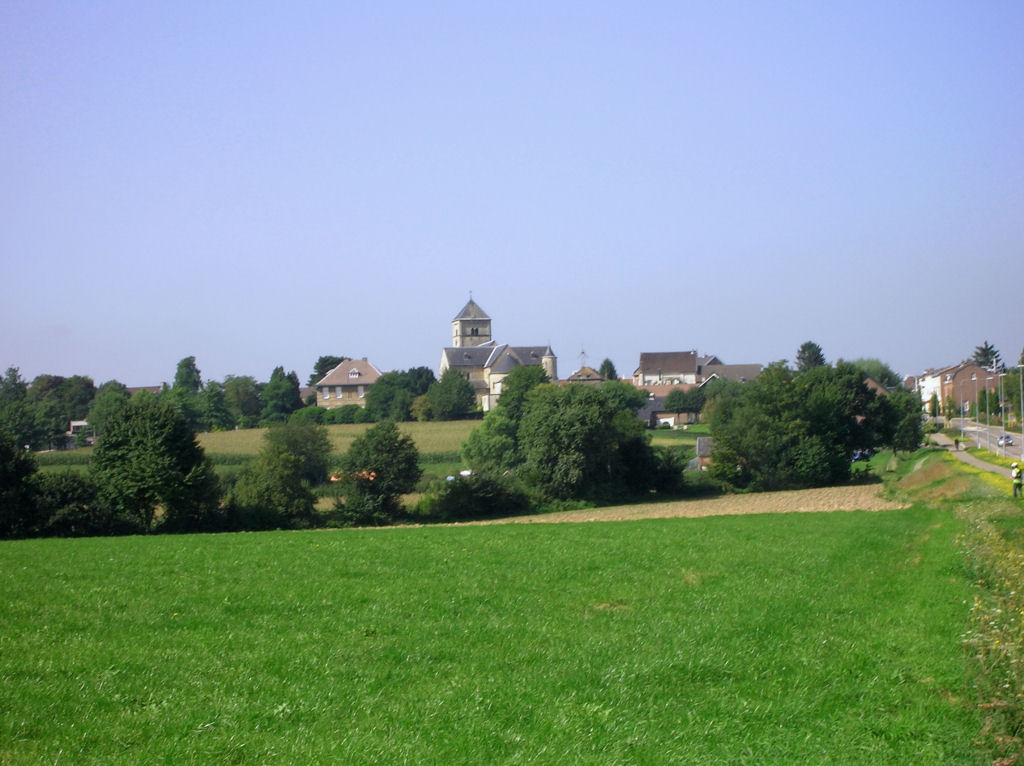

- Flag Coat of arms

- Location in the Netherlands Location in the province of Limburg in the Netherlands
- Coordinates: 50°52′35″N 5°52′55″E
- Country: Netherlands
- Province: Limburg
- Municipality: Voerendaal

Area
  - Total: 0.80 km^{2} (0.31 sq mi)
- Elevation: 134 m (440 ft)

Population (2021)
  - Total: 1,735
  - Density: 2,200/km^{2} (5,600/sq mi)
- Time zone: UTC+1 (CET)
  - Summer (DST): UTC+2 (CEST)
- Postal code: 6343
- Dialing code: 045
- Major roads: A79 and A76

Klimmen (Limburgish: Klumme) is a village in the Dutch province of Limburg. It is located in the municipality of Voerendaal, about 7 km west of Heerlen.

== History ==
The village was first mentioned in the middle of the 11th century as "de Clumena". The etymology is unclear. Klimmen developed in the Early Middle Ages.

The St Remigius Church is a three aisled basilica-like church. It has 11th or 12th century elements. In the 14th century, the tower was added. The church was redesigned between 1904 and 1906 by Pierre and Joseph Cuypers.

Klimmen was a separate municipality until 1982, when it was merged with Voerendaal.

== Transportation ==
The Klimmen-Ransdaal railway station opened in 1915 on the Heerlen to Schin op Geul railway line.

== Gallery ==
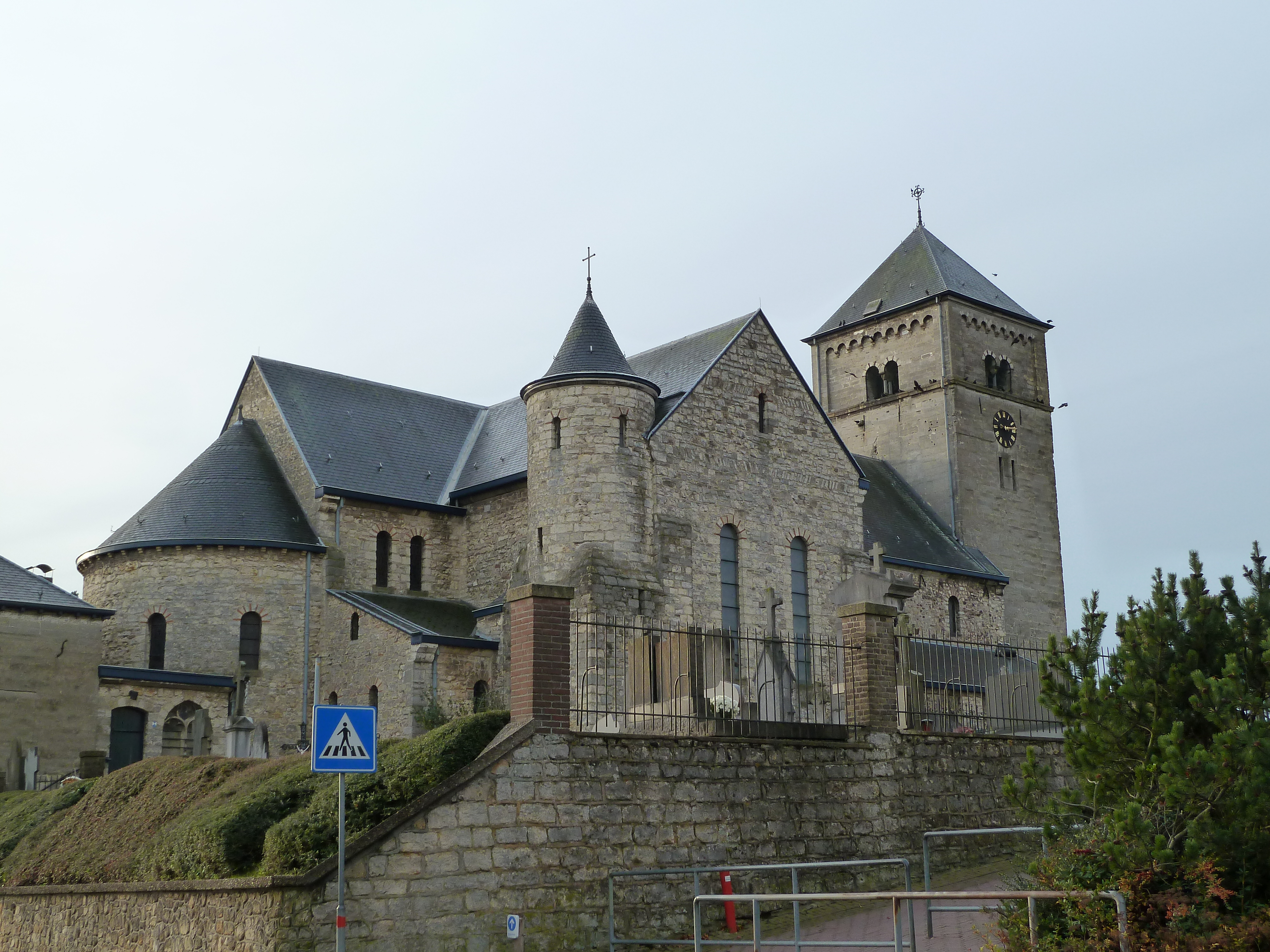
St Remigius Church

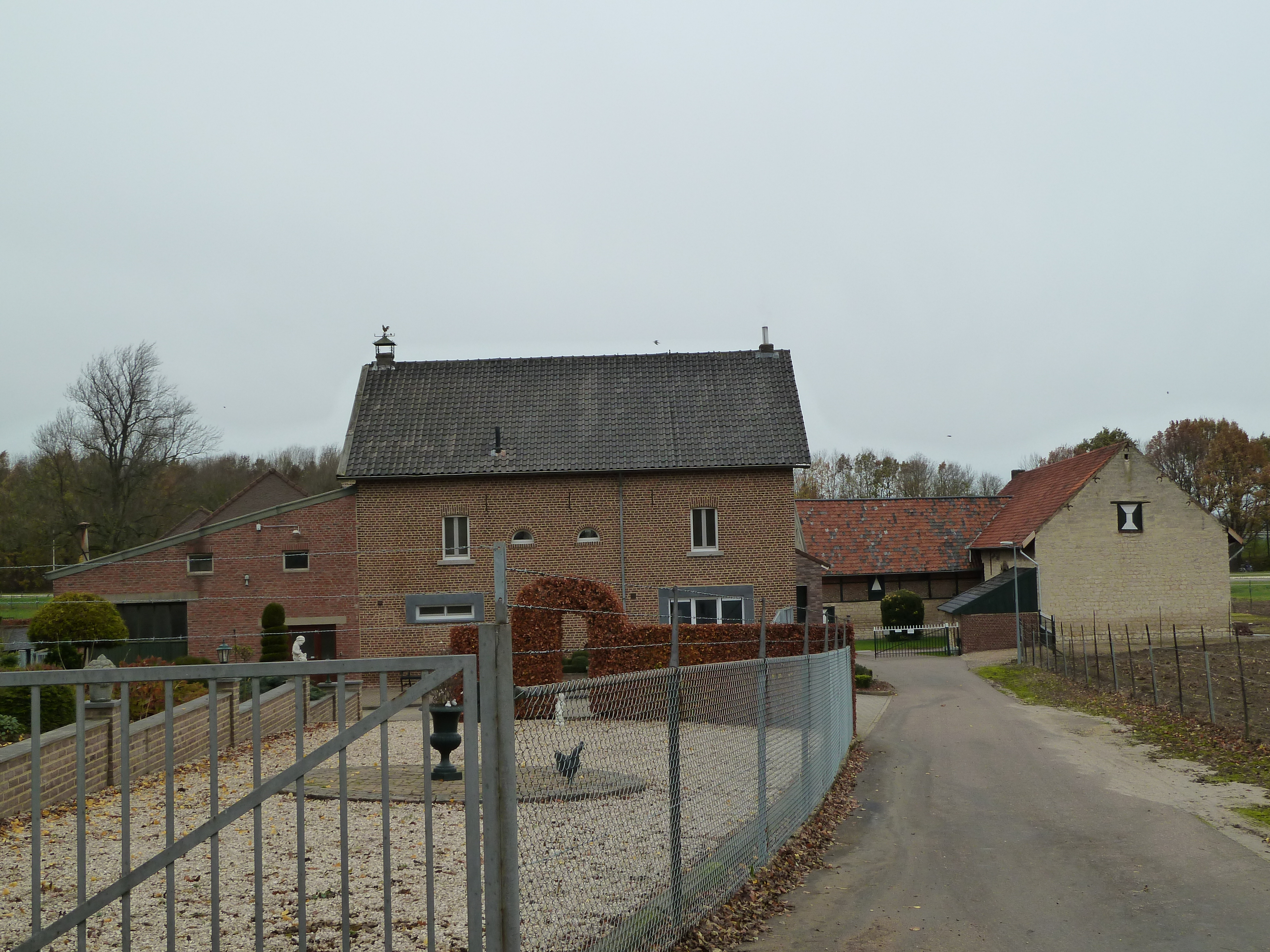
Farm in Klimmen

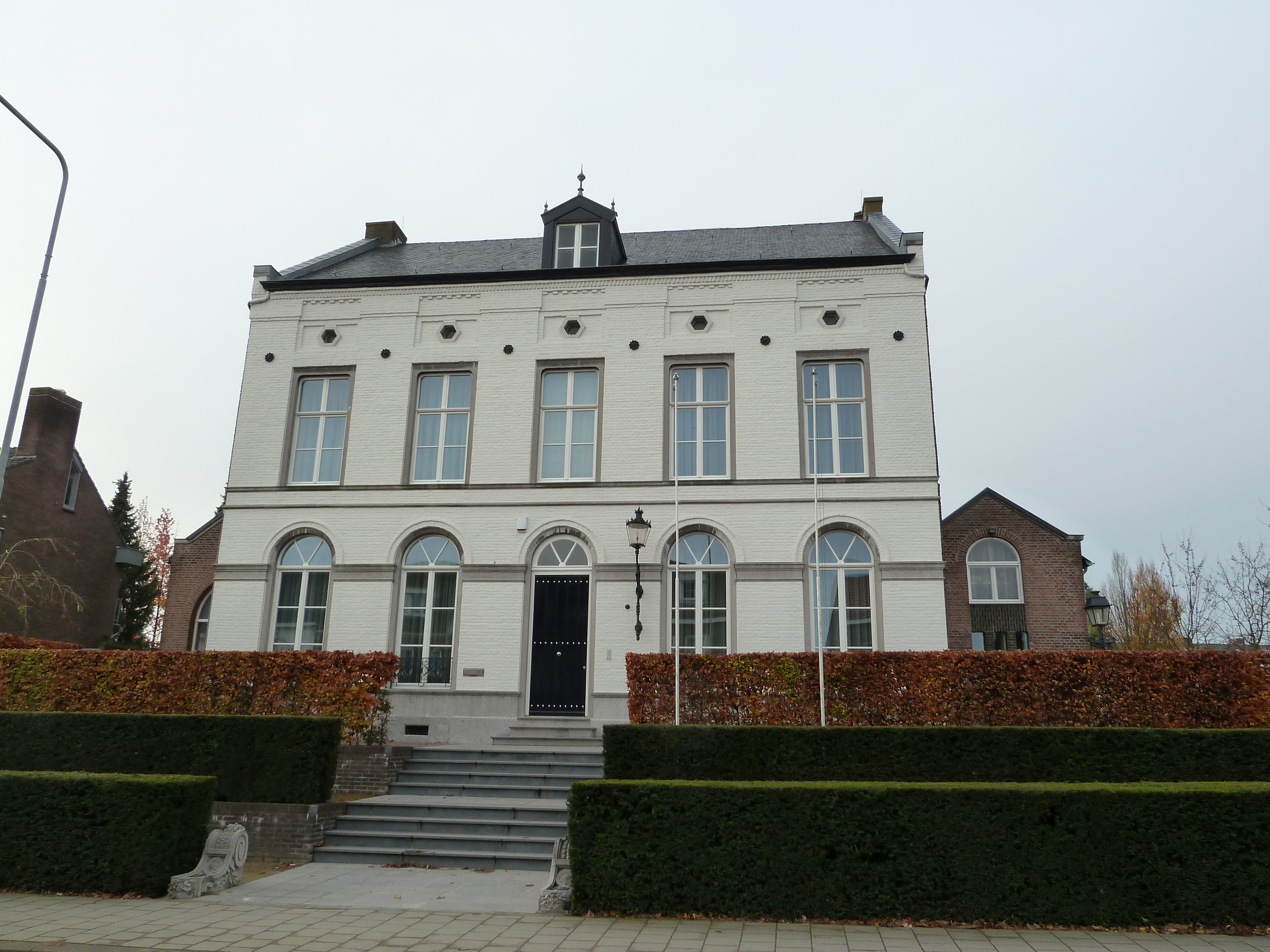
Former town hall

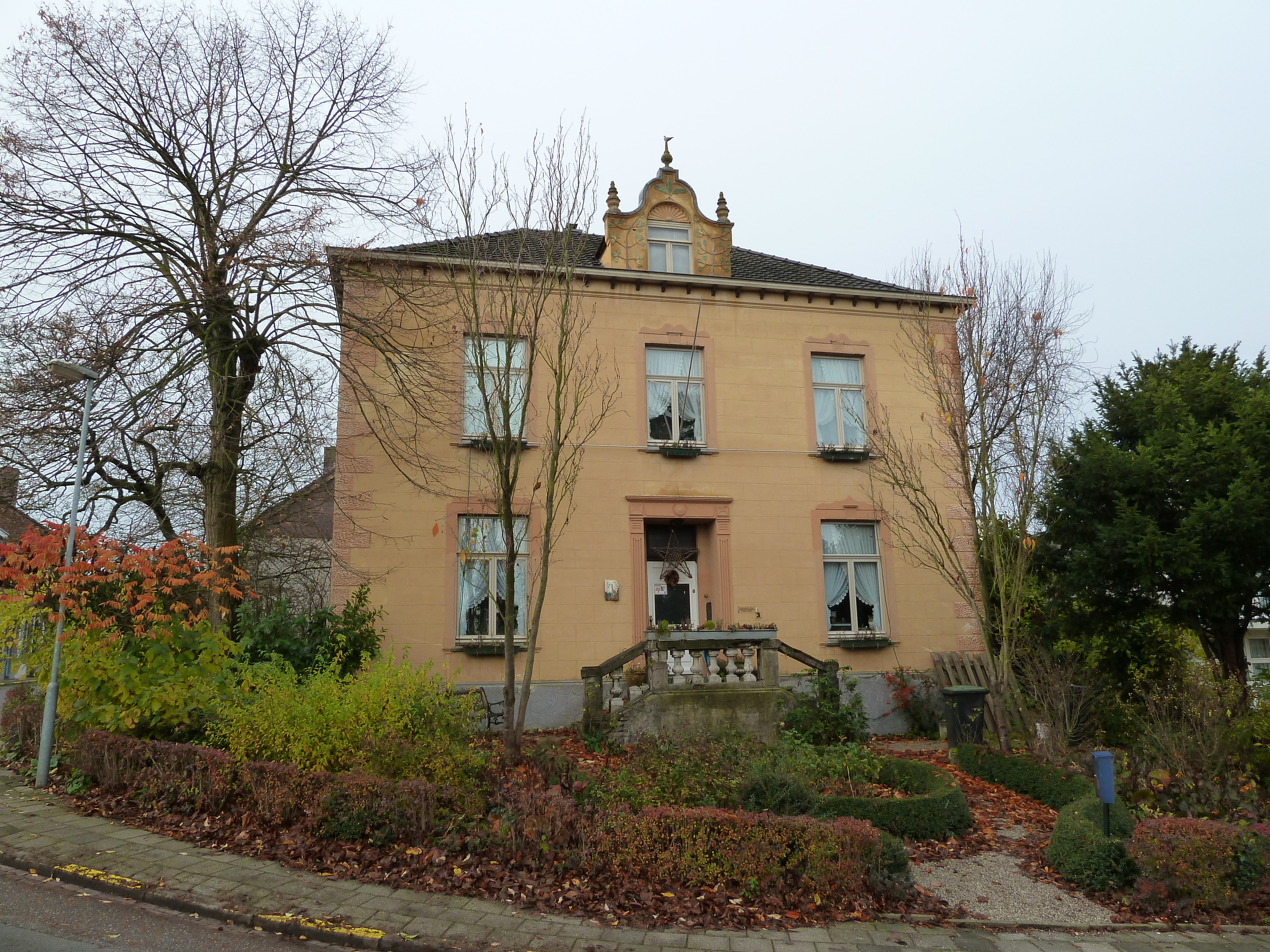
Villa in Klimmen
