= Ubachsberg =

- Village
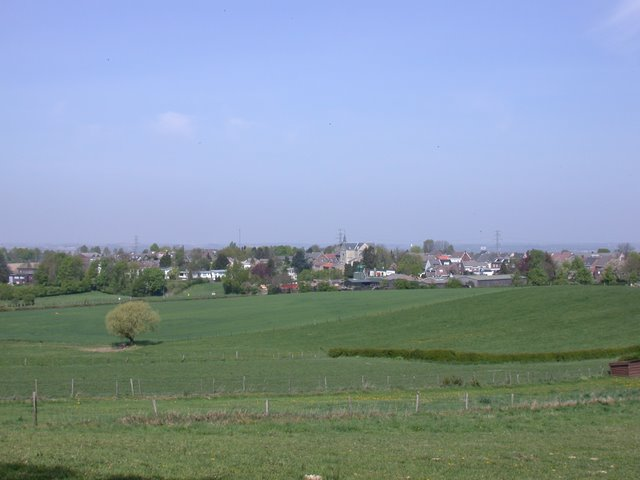

- Location in the Netherlands Location in the province of Limburg in the Netherlands
- Coordinates: 50°51′10″N 5°56′50″E
- Country: Netherlands
- Province: Limburg
- Municipality: Voerendaal

Area
  - Total: 0.55 km^{2} (0.21 sq mi)
- Elevation: 101 m (331 ft)

Population (2021)
  - Total: 1,430
  - Density: 2,600/km^{2} (6,700/sq mi)
- Time zone: UTC+1 (CET)
  - Summer (DST): UTC+2 (CEST)
- Postal code: 6367
- Dialing code: 045

Ubachsberg (Dutch pronunciation: [ˈybɑxsbɛr(ə)x]) is a village in the Dutch province of Limburg. It is located in the municipality of Voerendaal.

The village was first mentioned in 1380 as "opten Berch", and means "hill of the Ubachs family". Ubachsberg developed in the Early Middle Ages on the road from Simpelveld to Sittard.

The Catholic St Bernardus Church is a neoclassic cruciform church built in 1842.

Restaurant De Leuf (2 Michelin stars) is located in the village.

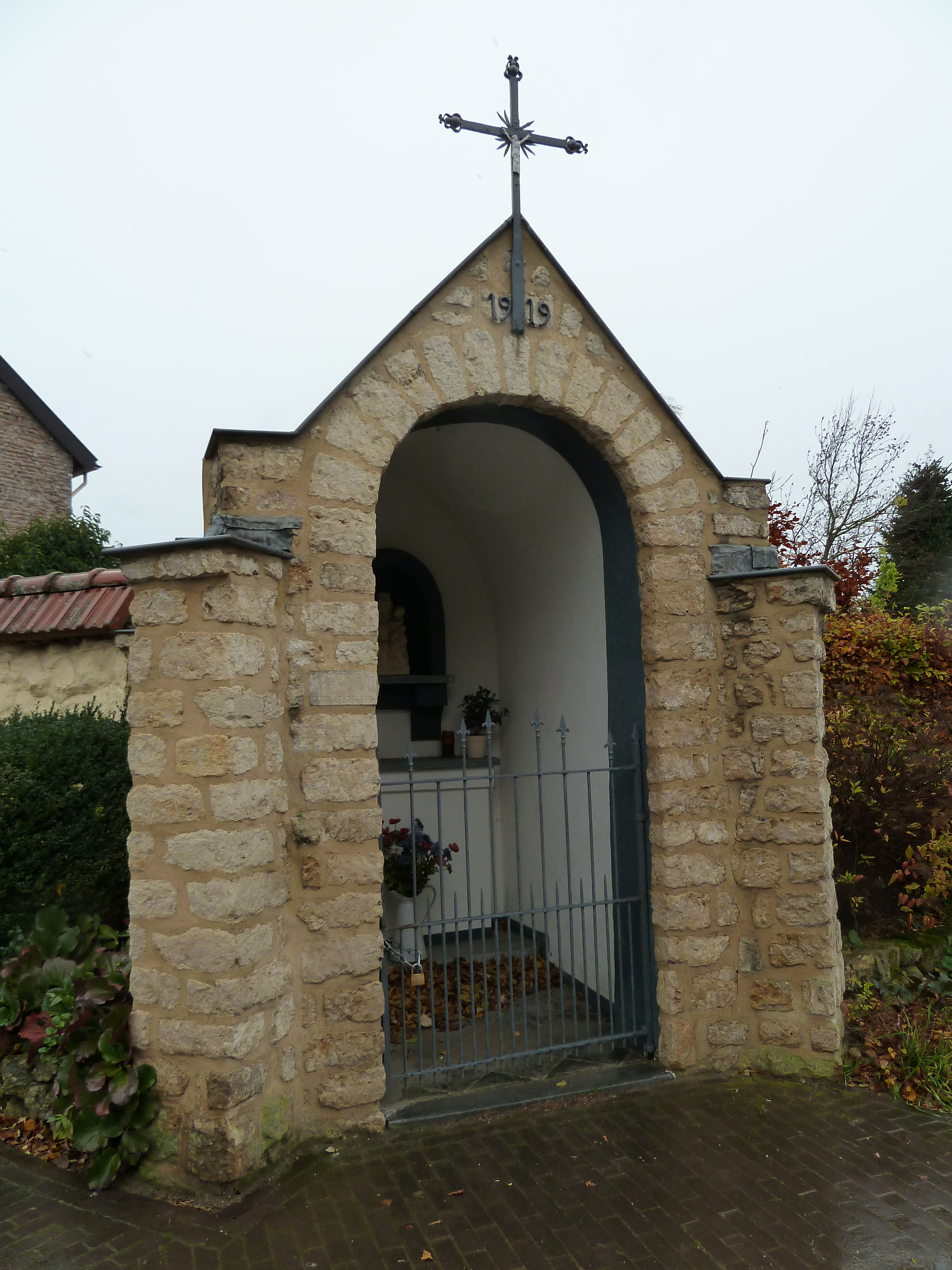
Chapel in the "Oude Schoolstraat"

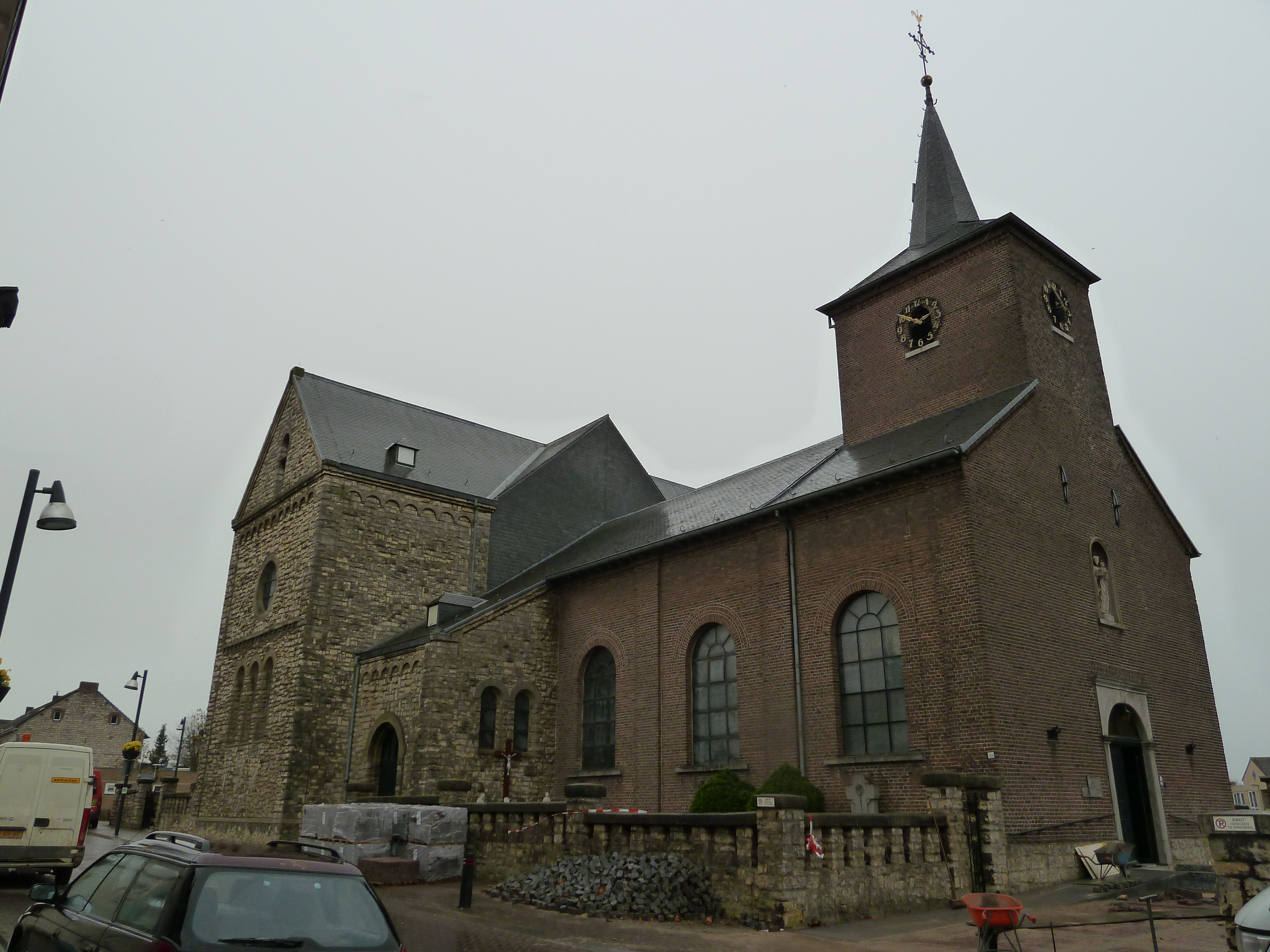
Sint-Bernarduskerk

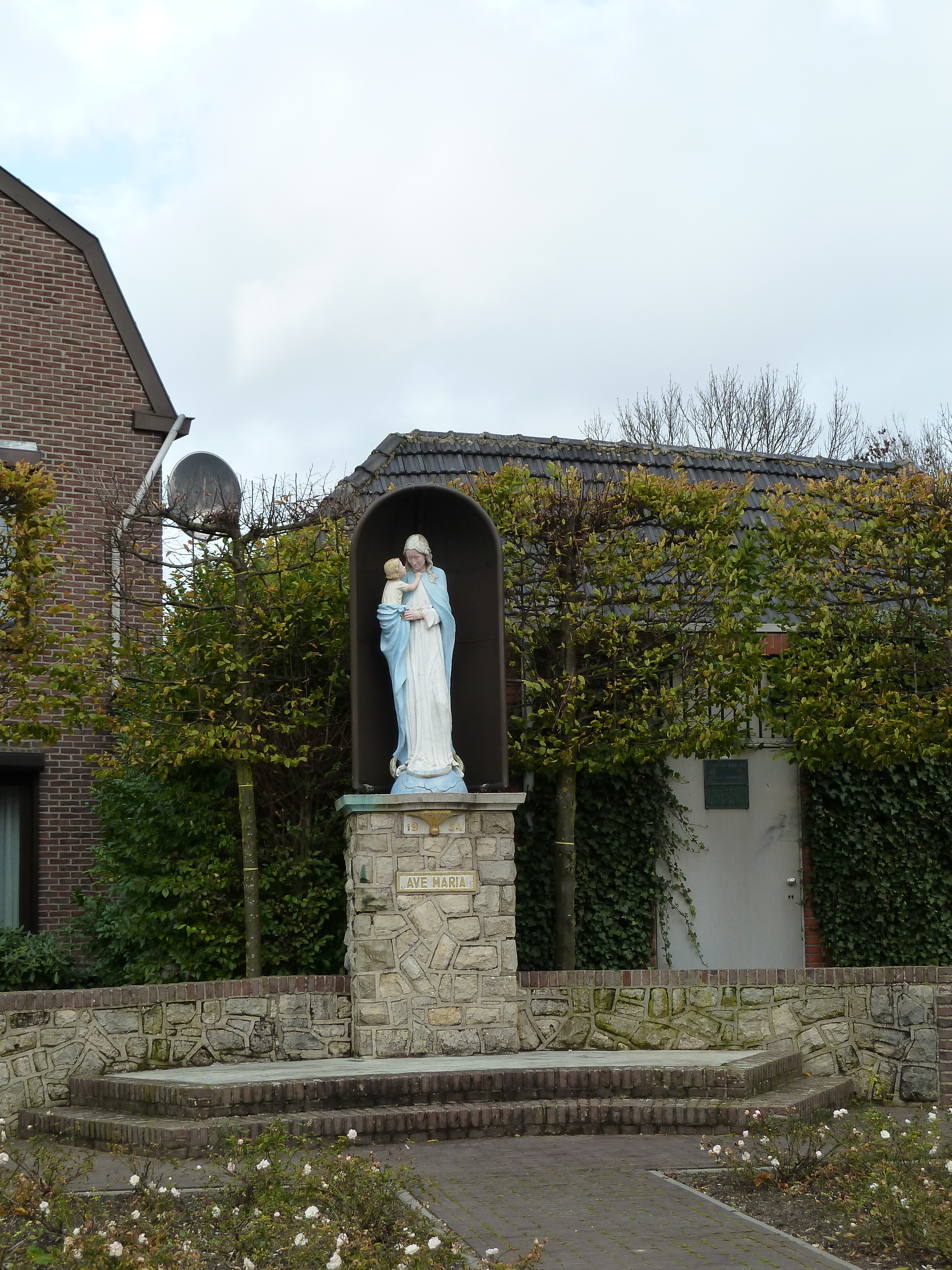
Maria statue Hunsstraat

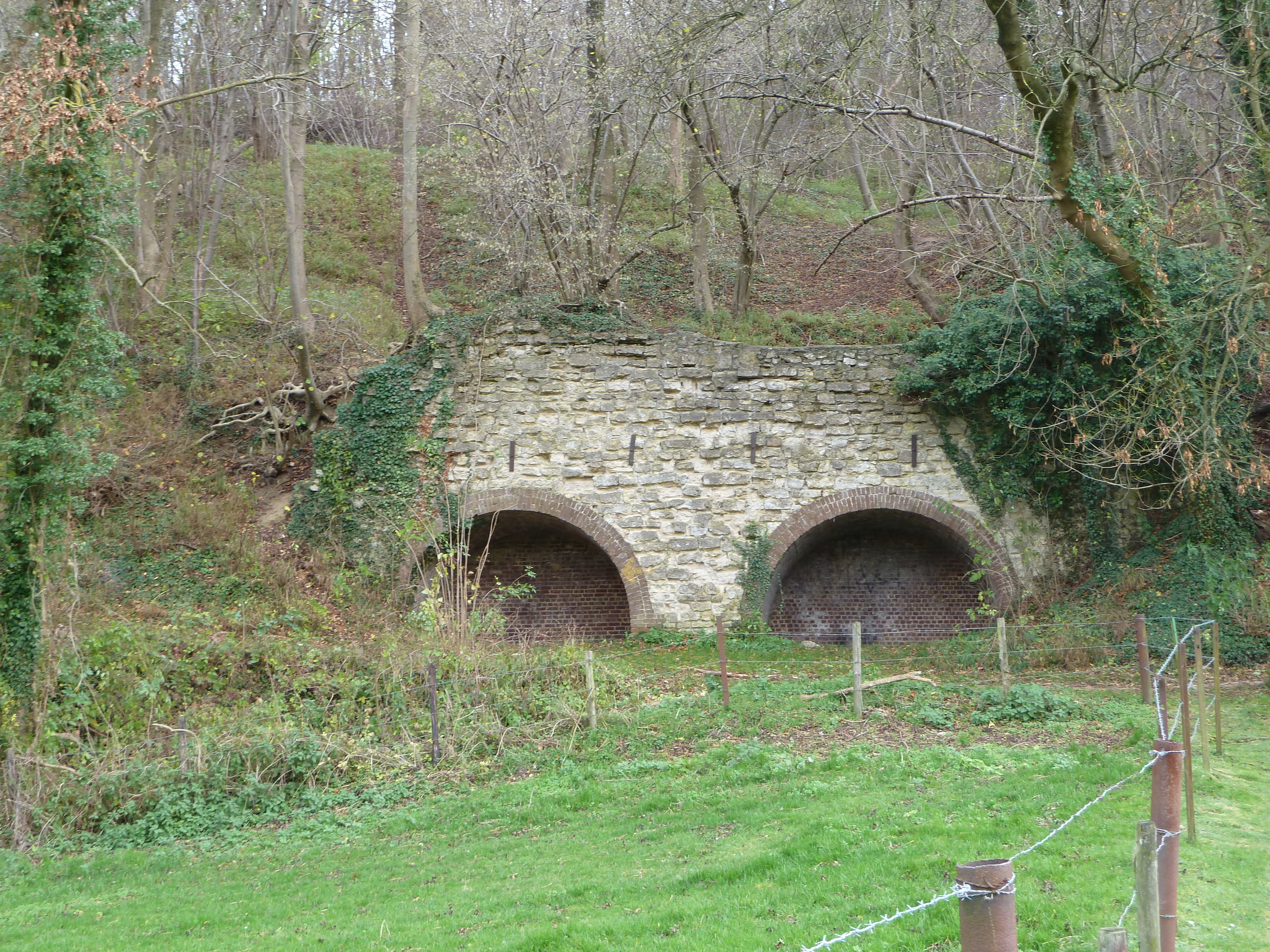
Limekiln
