= Voerendaal =

Voerendaal Voelender
- Municipality
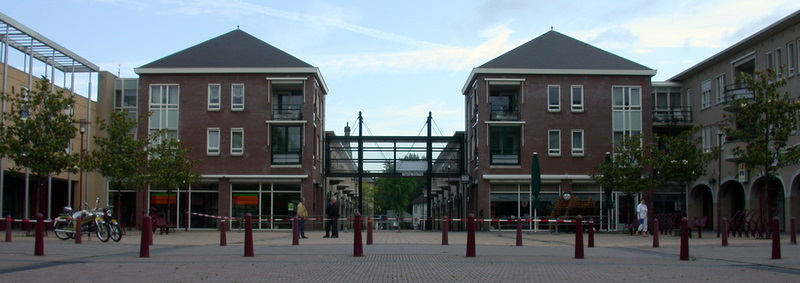
- Town of Voerendaal

- Flag Coat of arms

- Location in Limburg
- Coordinates: 50°53′N 5°56′E
- Country: Netherlands
- Province: Limburg

Government
  - Body: Municipal council
  - Mayor: Wil Houben (VVD)

Area
  - Total: 31.52 km^{2} (12.17 sq mi)
  - Land: 31.51 km^{2} (12.17 sq mi)
  - Water: 0.01 km^{2} (0.0039 sq mi)
- Elevation: 92 m (302 ft)

Population (January 2021)
  - Total: 12,466
  - Density: 396/km^{2} (1,030/sq mi)
- Demonym: Voerendaler
- Time zone: UTC+1 (CET)
  - Summer (DST): UTC+2 (CEST)
- Postcode: 6310–6312, 6343, 6367
- Area code: 045
- Website: www.voerendaal.nl

Voerendaal (Dutch pronunciation: [ˈvuːrə(n)daːl]; Limburgish: Voelender) is a municipality and a town in the southeastern Netherlands.

== Population centres ==
- Barrier
- Colmont
- Craubeek
- Dolberg
- Fromberg
- Heek
- Hellebeuk
- Klimmen
- Koulen
- Kunrade
- Mingersberg
- Opscheumer
- Overheek
- Ransdaal
- Retersbeek
- Termaar
- Termoors
- Ubachsberg
- Voerendaal
- Weustenrade
- Winthagen

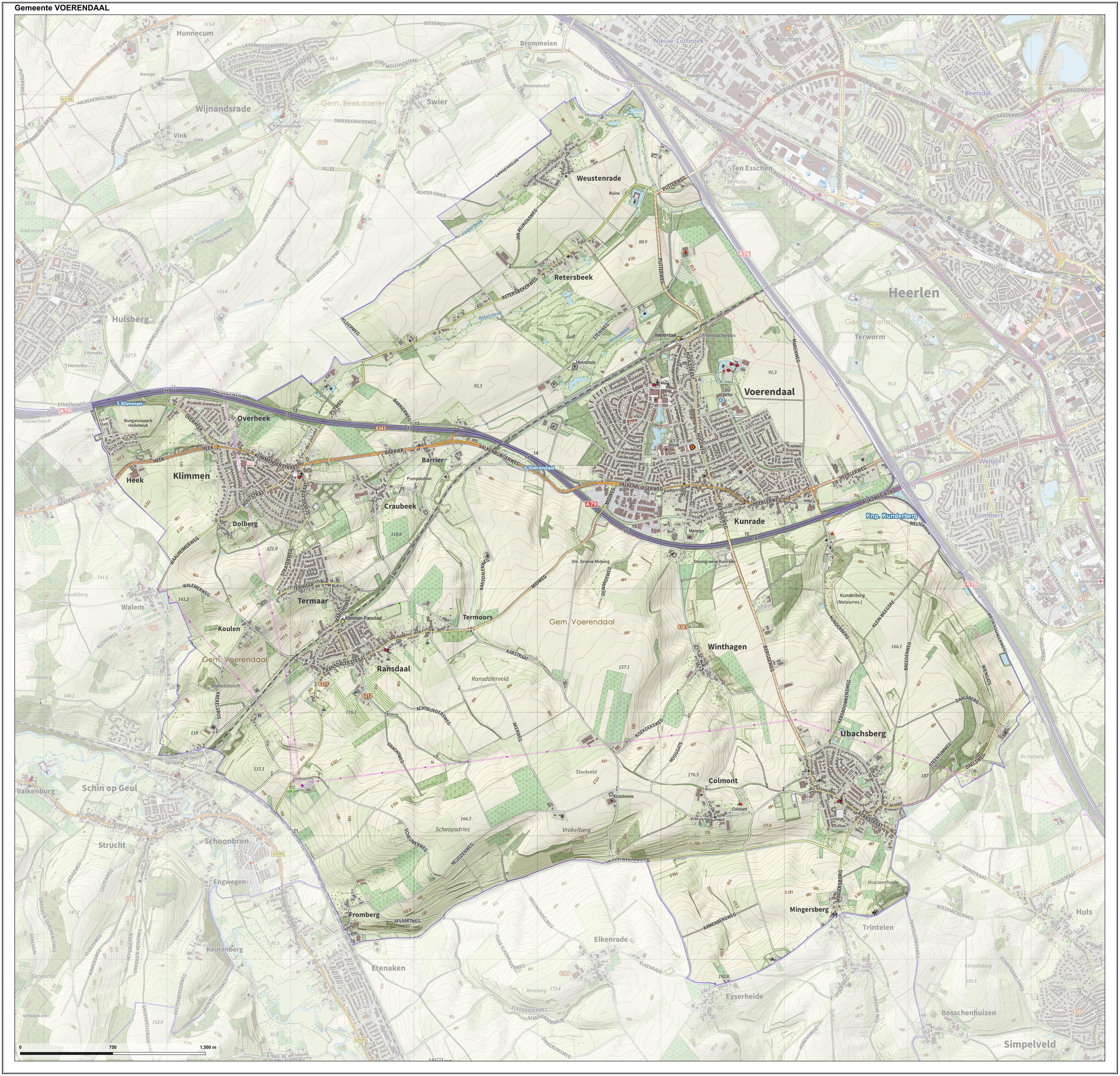

Dutch topographic map of the municipality of Voerendaal, June 2015

== History ==
The Romans left the ruins from a Roman villa rustica as a legacy. In 1049 pope Leo IX initiated the Catholic Church - Sint Laurentiuskerk. During medieval times many castles were built: Cortenbach, Haeren, Puth, Rivieren and Terworm. Also castles such as Hoenshuis and Overst Voerendaal. The area was mined for marl (mergel in Dutch) and coal.

== Transportation ==
There are 2 train stations, Klimmen-Ransdaal and Voerendaal.

== Notable people ==
- Roel Brouwers (born 1981) a Dutch former footballer with 289 club caps, lived in Voerendaal while playing for Borussia Monchengladbach

== Gallery ==
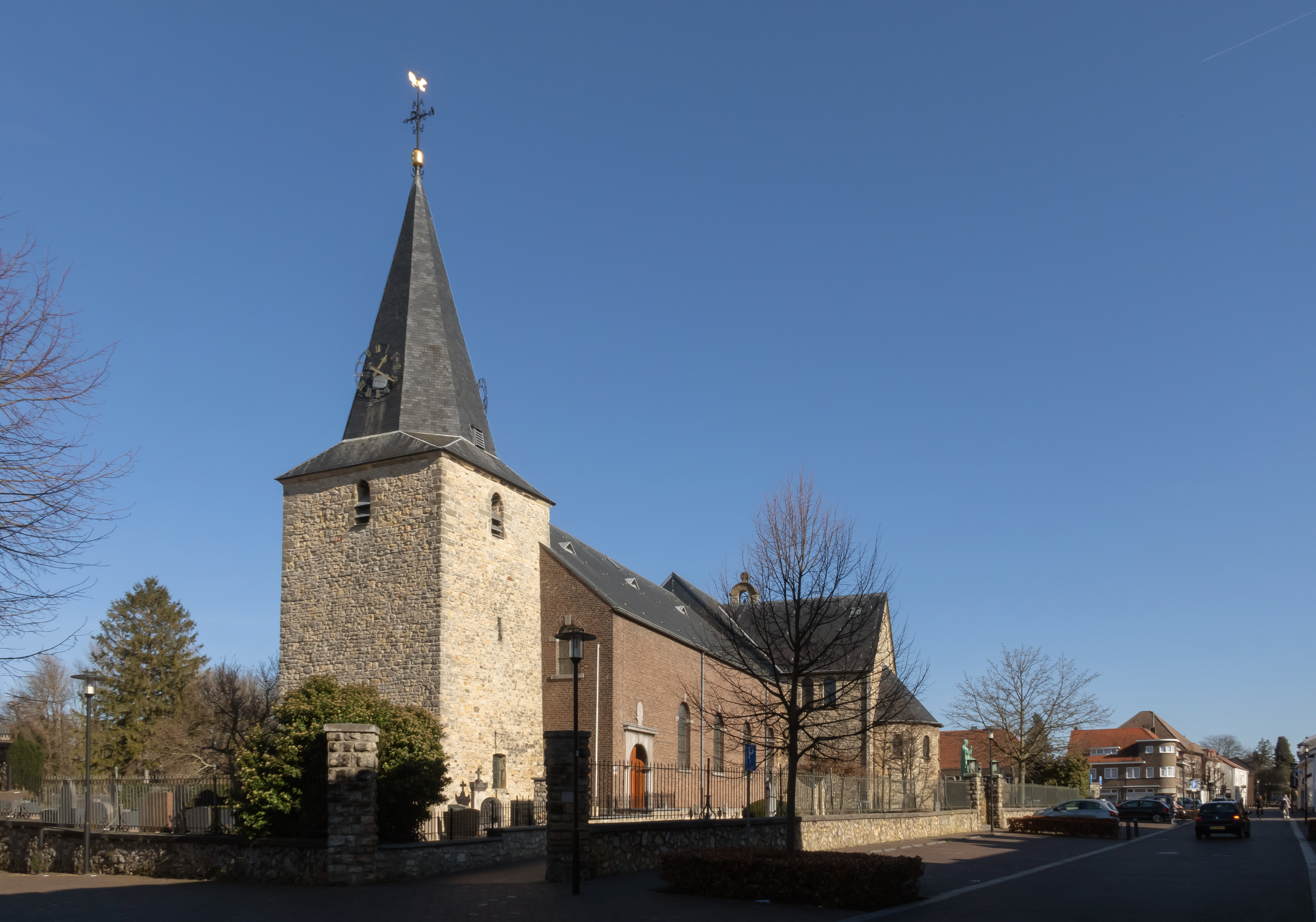
Church: Sint Laurentiuskerk

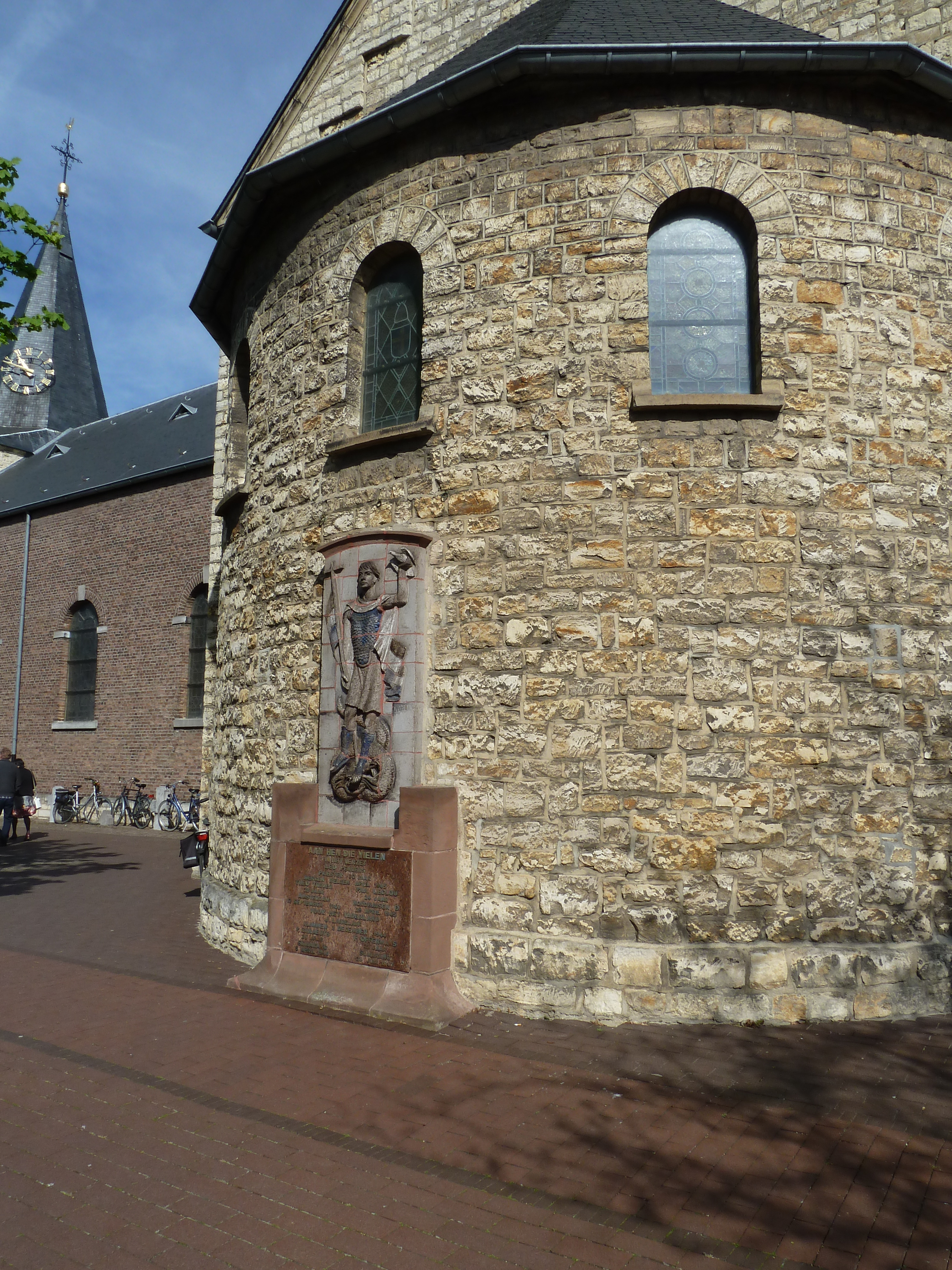
Monument near church

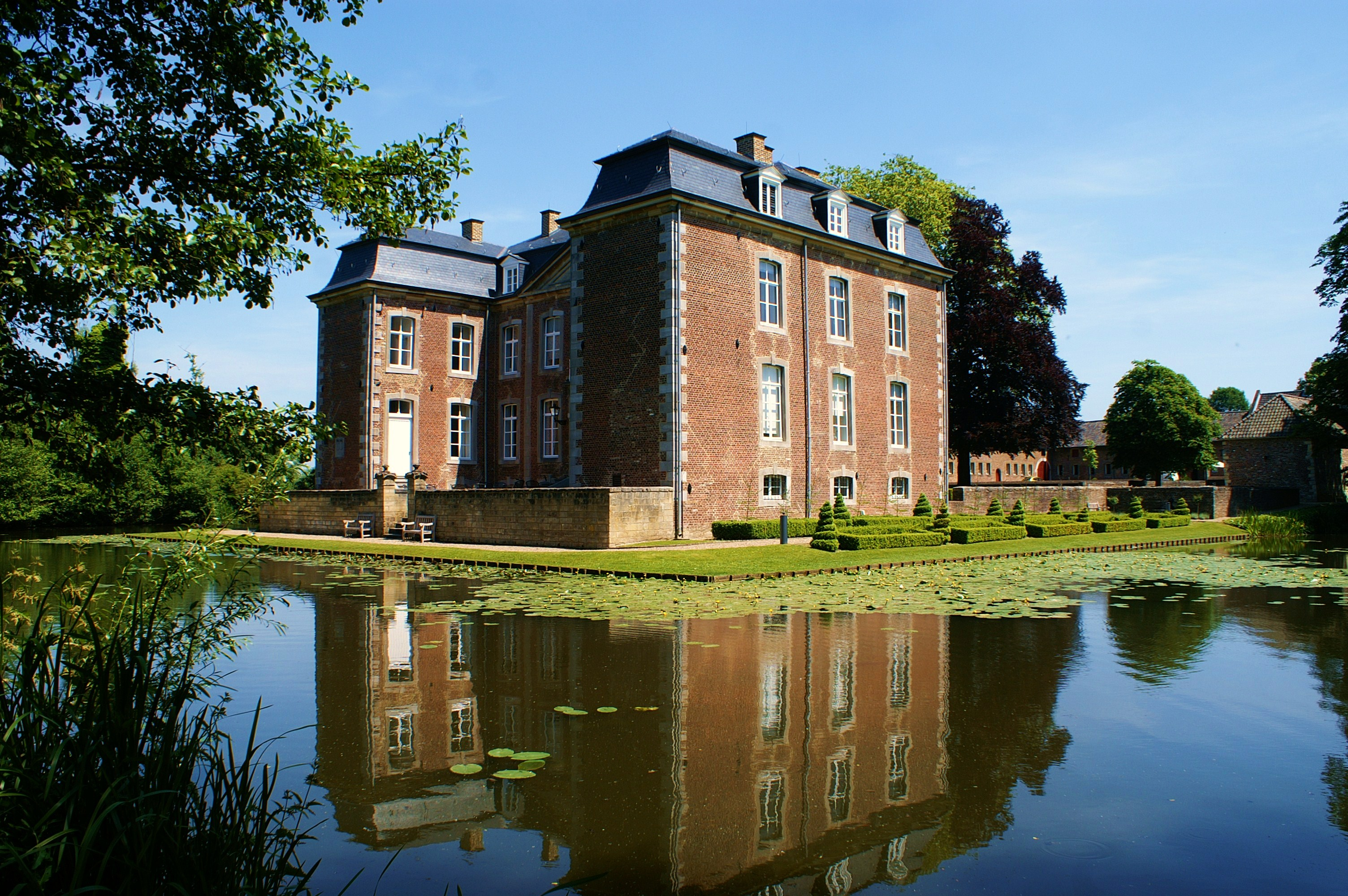
Cortenbach Castle

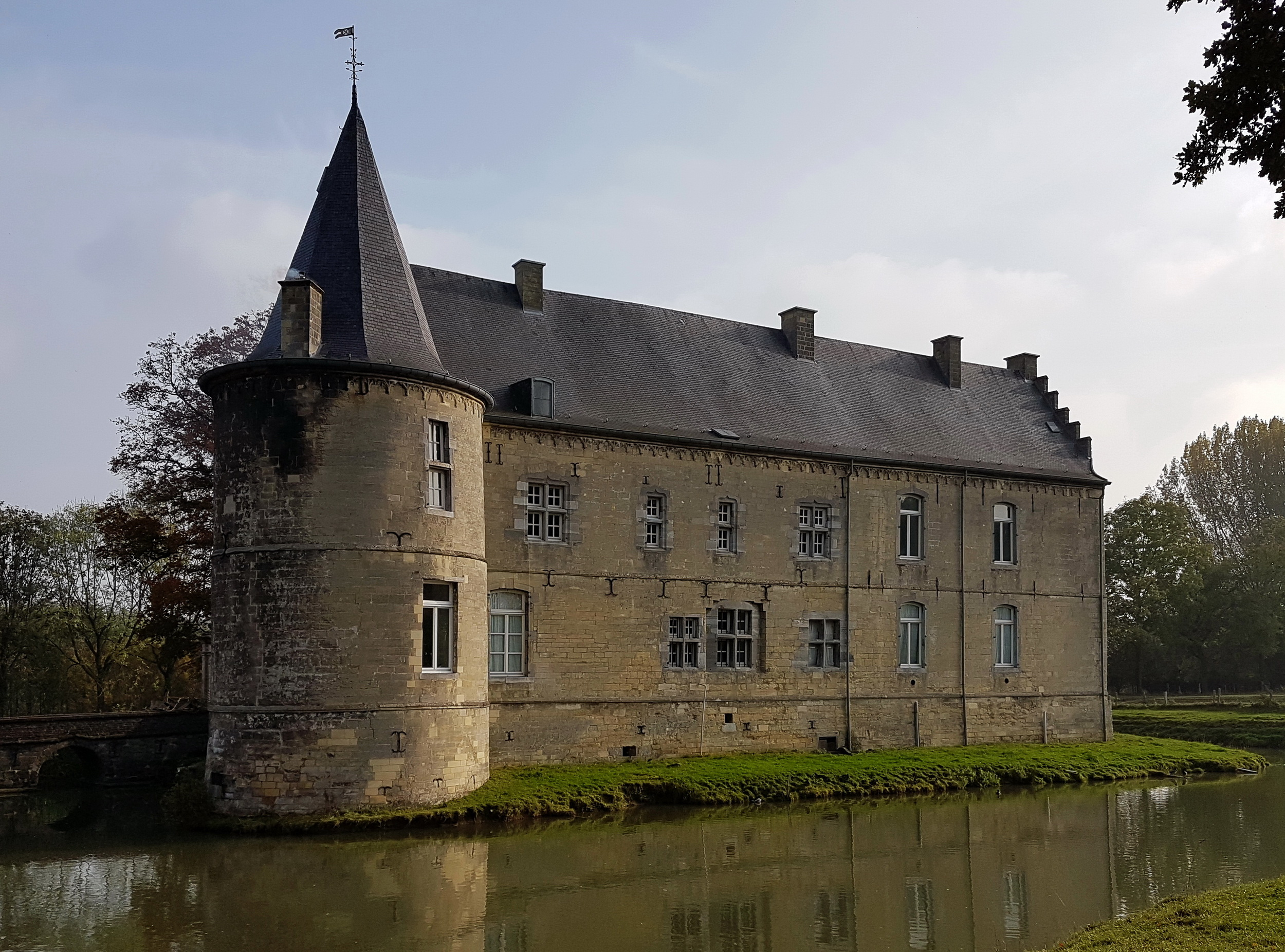
Rivieren Castle - Voerendaal
