= Marijke van Beukering =

Member of the Dutch House of Representatives

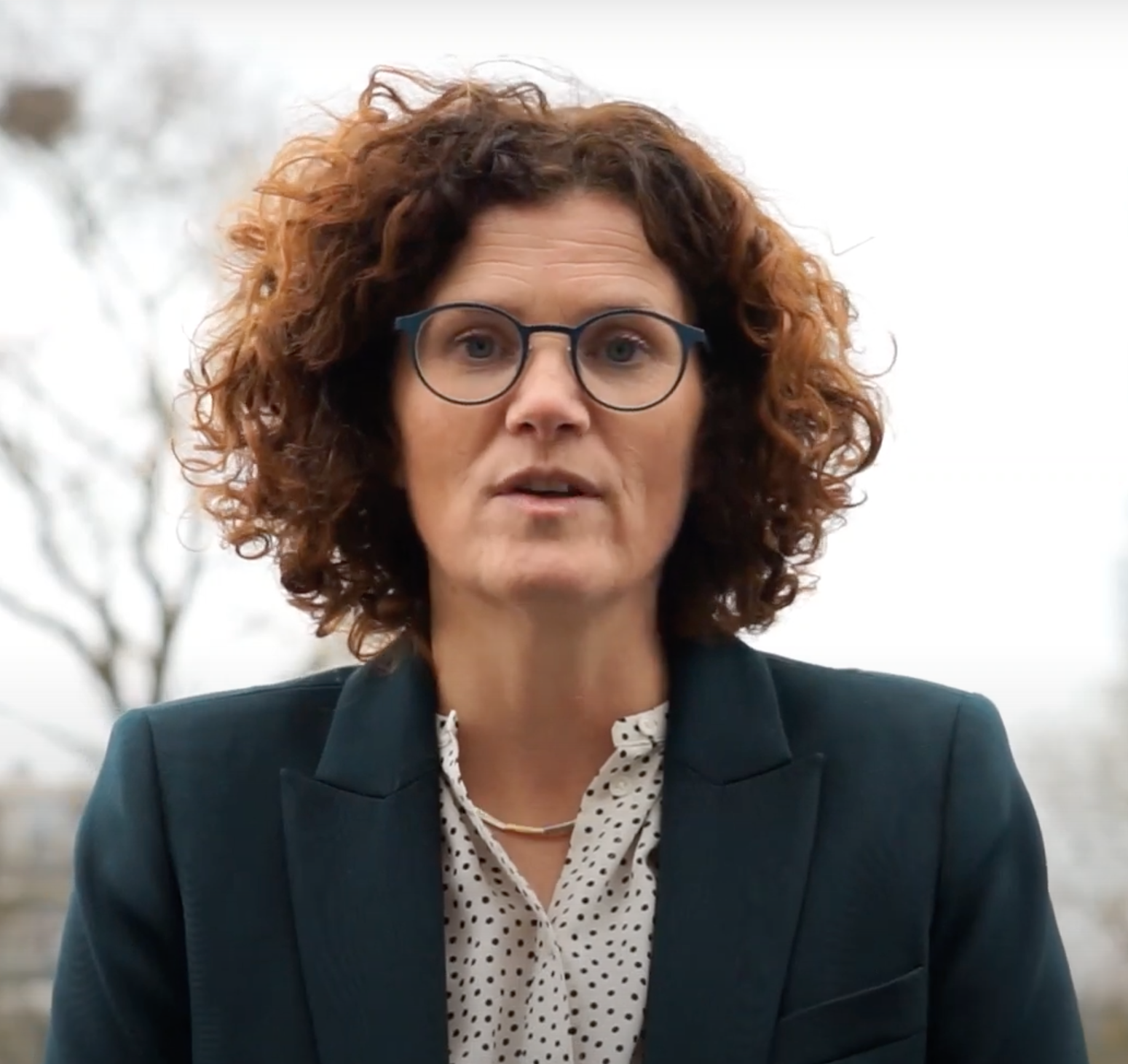

Mayor of Nieuwegein
- Incumbent
- Assumed office 5 June 2023
- Preceded by: Frans Backhuijs

Member of the House of Representatives
- In office 21 April 2021 – 1 June 2023
- Preceded by: Sidney Smeets
- Succeeded by: Hans Teunissen
- In office 20 May 2020 – 30 March 2021
- Preceded by: Monica den Boer
- In office 22 January 2020 – 13 May 2020
- Preceded by: Rens Raemakers
- Succeeded by: Rens Raemakers

Alderwoman in IJsselstein
- In office 29 April 2010 – 21 September 2017

Member of the IJsselstein municipal council
- In office May 2006 – April 2010

Personal details
- Born: Maria Josefina Theresia Gabriëlle Huijbregts; 30 December 1971 (age 54) Cuijk, North Brabant
- Party: Democrats 66
- Spouse: Sander van Beukering
- Children: 2
- Education: Schoevers European Secretarial Academy

Maria Josefina Theresia Gabriëlle "Marijke" van Beukering-Huijbregts (born 30 December 1971) is a Dutch politician, who has served in the House of Representatives and who has been the Mayor of Nieuwegein since 2023. She is a member of the social-liberal party Democrats 66 (D66).

Before entering politics, she worked as a secretary in the Netherlands and abroad, and she later founded her own company. She became D66's sole member in the IJsselstein municipal council in 2006. When she was re-elected in 2010, Van Beukering became an alderwoman. She resigned in 2017 because of problems with the municipality's cooperation with Montfoort, but was re-appointed shortly after. She stepped down once more in November 2017, and subsequently worked as an independent advisor, mostly for organizations in the public sector.

She filled the seat of MP Rens Raemakers, who was on sick leave, for four months in 2020. Seven days later, she replaced MP Monica den Boer to become a permanent member of the House. Van Beukering lost re-election in 2021 but succeeded MP Sidney Smeets in April 2021. She became the Mayor of Nieuwegein two years later.

== Early life and education ==
Van Beukering was born on 30 December 1971 in Cuijk in north-east North Brabant. Her father was a school principal. She attended the Merletcollege for her secondary education and received a havo diploma. In 1989, she started a two-year training at the Schoevers European Secretarial Academy. Van Beukering has also done a postgraduate training in Public Leadership at the Vrije Universiteit Amsterdam in 2019.

== Early career ==
She started her career in 1991 as a secretary and archivist at the Ministry of Foreign Affairs, working successively in The Hague; Abidjan, Ivory Coast; and Brussels. In 1999, she got a new job as the assistant of the Head of Mission EU-Programme at the Customs and Fiscal Assistance Office in the Bosnian capital Sarajevo. She ended her foreign career of nine years in 2002, when she started working for a secondment agency. She was on assignment as a secretary at Commit Arbo BV, an arbodienst, for one year. She founded a secretarial services company called "SECONDIE" as its sole trader the following year.

== IJsselstein politics ==
She became a member of the municipal council of IJsselstein besides her job in May 2006, after her party had received one of the 23 seats during the elections. In 2007 and 2008, she also served as director and joint owner of the secretarial services company Co-Support BV.

Van Beukering was re-elected as the D66's lijsttrekker with 1,334 votes during the March 2010 municipal elections. Her party received three seats in total. She became Alderwoman of Society in IJsselstein in April 2010, when D66 became part of the new executive board. Her portfolio included the project multifunctional sport facilities. Because of her new position, she stopped her activities at her company and vacated her seat in the council. During the 2014 elections, she was again the lijsttrekker of her party, which received a plurality in the council of five seats. She returned to the executive board as Alderwoman of People, a position with a portfolio highly similar to her previous one, with as special project "the customer at the center and deregulation".

She stepped down on 8 February 2017 simultaneously with her colleague Vincent van den Berg (CDA) because it was revealed that a cooperation between the municipalities IJsselstein and Montfoort had cost €1.5 million more the year before than planned. This resulted in the fall of the executive board. Van Beukering's departure was planned thirty days later. Both municipalities had started to merge their civil services in 2014 in order to decrease spending on their bureaucracies, but problems had emerged resulting in a need for an estimated €1.7 million to resolve them. A motion of no confidence in the municipal council earlier had failed. During the formation of a new executive board, the coalition fell as well, as D66 wanted resigned alderpersons to return, while this was unacceptable to the VVD. D66, being the largest party in IJsselstein, formed a new coalition just over two weeks after the fall of the board. Van Beukering returned as Alderwoman of Economic Affairs.

Van Beukering appeared on place 24 on the party list of D66 during the 2017 Dutch general election. She received 4,971 preferential votes, and her party won nineteen seats – not enough for Van Beukering to be elected to the House of Representatives.

On 21 September 2017 she resigned from her position as alderwoman again together with two others. A report had come out the month before that criticized the information the executive board had given to the municipal council about the cooperation with Montfoort. This had resulted in the CDA leaving the coalition. Van Beukering resigned after a number of parties with a majority in the council threatened with a motion of no confidence. In turn, the three resigning alderpersons declared that the council had become "sour" and was making it impossible for the executive board to govern. D66 subsequently passed the opportunity to form a new executive board to the second biggest party. Van Beukering was D66's lijstduwer in IJsselstein in the 2018 and 2022 municipal elections.

== Post-alderwomanship ==
After her terms as alderwoman, she worked as an independent advisor. As such, she has served as a project manager at the Netherlands Red Cross (2018), a member of the supervisory board of social work provider Amfors Groep (2019–2020), a clean air coordinator for the region IJmond employed by the municipality Velsen (2019–2020), and a program manager at Breed Spectrum Aanbieders for child protection in Eemland (2019–2020).

== House of Representatives ==
On 22 January 2020 Van Beukering became a temporary member of the House of Representatives, replacing Rens Raemakers who was on sick leave due to an occupational burnout. She was the next person in line for a seat of D66 because of her place on the party list during the 2017 general election. Within the D66 caucus, she became the spokesperson in the areas of child protection, juvenile crime, child abuse, the Participation Act, poverty and debt policy, and caregivers. She became part of the parliamentary Committees for Finances; Social Affairs and Employment; and Health, Welfare and Sport.

Raemakers returned to the House on 13 May 2020, ending Van Beukering-Huijbregt's membership of the body. However, a week later, D66 MP Monica den Boer left the House to take a job as professor. Van Beukering succeeded her and thus became a permanent member of the lower house. Her portfolio changed slightly: it now included security, but excluded juvenile issues. She was member of the Committees for Justice and Security and for Social Affairs and Employment.

She was the 25th candidate on the D66's party list in the 2021 Dutch general election but lost her bid for re-election. Her party received 24 seats, and Van Beukering personally received 2,215 votes. However, MP Sidney Smeets resigned a few weeks after his installation, and Van Beukering filled the vacancy. She was installed on April 21. Her focus was on the labor market, self-employment, AOW, pensions, income policy, leaves of absence, benefits, occupational disabilities, the intersection of labor and health care, and labor conditions, and she was on the Committees for Health, Welfare and Sport, for Kingdom Relations, for Public Expenditure, and for Social Affairs and Employment. Van Beukering worked on a bill in early 2022 to increase the say participants have in how money is invested by their pension fund after the Council of State had advised on an earlier draft by D66. She took over that body's proposal to change the original bill's right of approval for participatants to a right of advise. She said that the bill could lead to more socially responsible investing.

== Mayor of Nieuwegein ==
After the Mayor of Nieuwegein – Frans Backhuijs – announced he would not seek a third term, Van Beukering was selected as his successor by the municipal council in April 2023. Van Beukering left the House of Representatives on 1 June, and she was sworn in as Nieuwegein's first female mayor four days later.

== Other positions ==
Besides her work as a politician, she served as the chair of the National Association First-Aid between May 2014 and June 2022. She did a training to become a first-aid instructor at the Dutch Organization Teachers First-Aid in Tilburg in 2005. Before being appointed chairwoman, she worked at the organization as its secretary (2004–2011) and subsequently as an advisor to the executive committee. She has written a first-aid manual together with Nico Schouten called EHBO Leren & Doen ("First aid learning & practicing"), that was published in 2012. A revised edition came out in 2016. Besides, she was member of the supervisory board of the "Prins Hendrik Fonds", an organization that distributes first aid subsidies, from 2017 until 2020.

== Personal life ==
Van Beukering is married to Sander van Beukering and has two daughters. She is a resident of IJsselstein, a town where she has lived since her return to the Netherlands from Sarajevo. She plays tennis and has been the chair of the tennis club IJTC Groenvliet since November 2017.

== Decorations ==
- Order of Orange-Nassau
  - Knight (3 July 2020)

== Electoral history ==
Electoral history of Marijke van Beukering
Year	Body	Party	Pos.	Votes	Result		Ref.
Year	Body	Party	Pos.	Votes	Party seats	Individual	Ref.
2021	House of Representatives	Democrats 66	25	2,215	24	Lost (Note: Van Beukering was appointed to the body later during the term due to a vacancy.)	
