= Boxmeer railway station =

Railway station in the Netherlands

Boxmeer
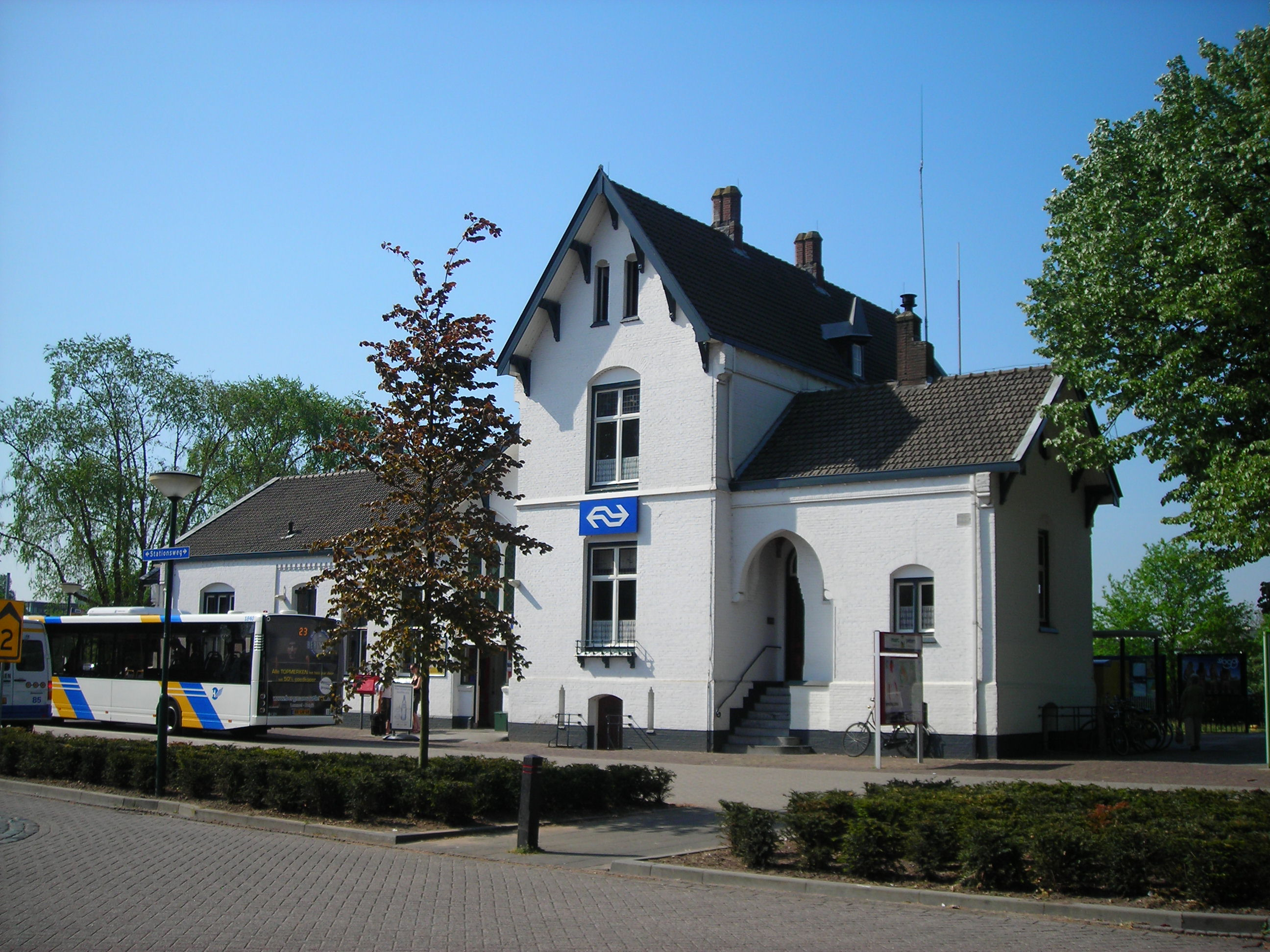

General information
- Location: Netherlands
- Coordinates: 51°38′40″N 5°56′22″E
- Line: Nijmegen–Venlo railway

History
- Opened: 1 June 1883

Services
Preceding station	Arriva Netherlands	Following station
Cuijk towards Nijmegen	Stoptrein 32200	Vierlingsbeek towards Roermond
Cuijk towards Nijmegen	Stoptrein 32300	Vierlingsbeek towards Venray
Location
- Location within Netherlands

Boxmeer is a railway station located in Boxmeer, Netherlands. The station was opened on 1 June 1883 and is located on the Nijmegen–Venlo railway. The station is currently operated by Arriva.

== Train services ==
The following local train services call at this station:

- Stoptrein: Nijmegen–Venlo–Roermond
- Stoptrein: Nijmegen–Venray
