= Cuijk railway station =

Railway station in the Netherlands

Cuijk
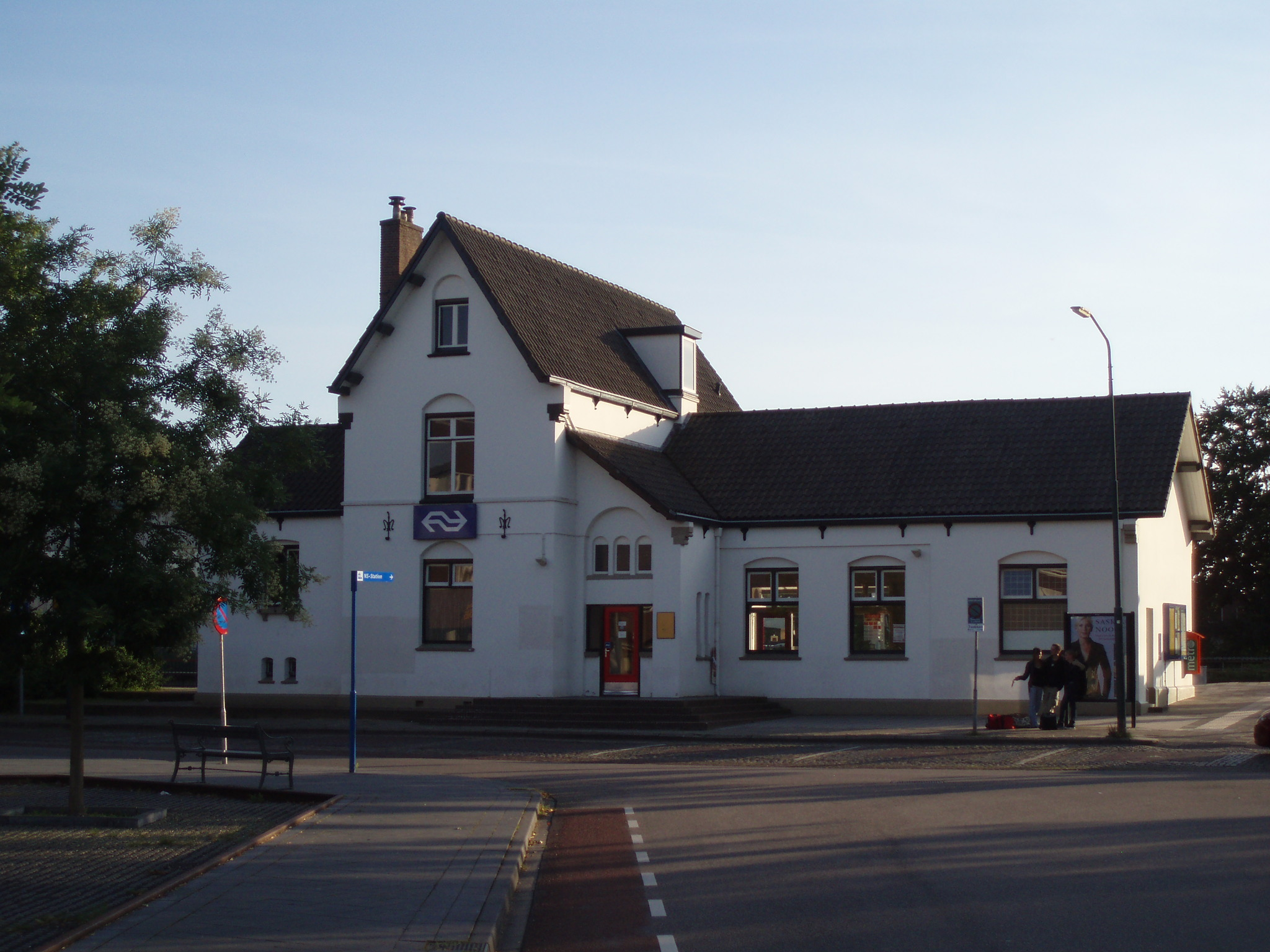

General information
- Location: Netherlands
- Coordinates: 51°43′35″N 5°52′27″E
- Line: Nijmegen–Venlo railway

History
- Opened: 1 June 1883

Services
Preceding station	Arriva Netherlands	Following station
Mook-Molenhoek towards Nijmegen	Stoptrein 32200	Boxmeer towards Roermond
Mook-Molenhoek towards Nijmegen	Stoptrein 32300	Boxmeer towards Venray
Location
- Location within Netherlands

Cuijk is a railway station located in Cuijk, Netherlands. The station was opened on 1 June 1883 and is located on the Maaslijn (Nijmegen–Venlo railway). The train services are operated by Arriva, a British multinational public transport company.

== Train services ==
The following local train services call at this station:

- Stoptrein: Nijmegen–Venlo–Roermond
- Stoptrein: Nijmegen–Venray

== Bus services ==
- 91: Haps–Mill–Odiliapeel–Volkel–Uden, operated by Arriva.
- 92: Grave–Mill–Haps–Cuijk–Oeffelt–Gennep–Oeffelt–Boxmeer–Overloon–Venray, operated by Arriva.
