= Nijmegen Heyendaal railway station =

Railway station in the Netherlands

Nijmegen Heyendaal
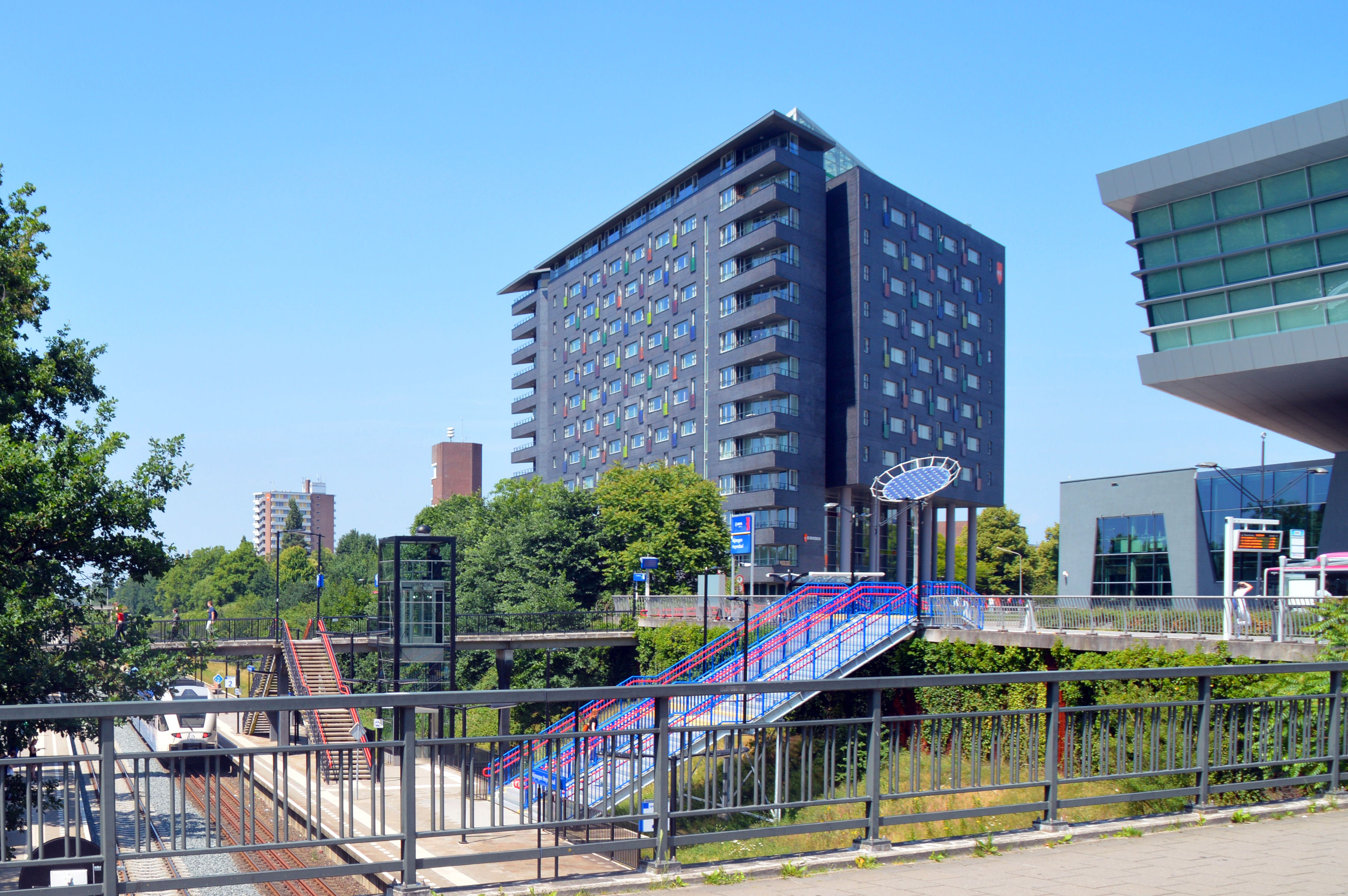

General information
- Location: Netherlands
- Coordinates: 51°49′37″N 5°52′04″E
- Line: Nijmegen–Venlo railway

Construction
- Architect: Cees Douma

Services
| Preceding station | Arriva Netherlands | Following station |
|---|---|---|
| Nijmegen Terminus | Stoptrein 32200 | Mook-Molenhoek towards Roermond |
| Nijmegen Terminus | Stoptrein 32300 | Mook-Molenhoek towards Venray |
Location
- Location within Netherlands

Nijmegen Heyendaal is a railway station located near Radboud University in the southeast of Nijmegen, the Netherlands. The station was opened on 28 May 1972 and is located on the Maaslijn (Nijmegen–Venlo). The train services are operated by Arriva.

Until 1991, a branch line ran from Heyendaal station to Kleve, Germany. During that time the station had three tracks: 1 and 2 for Nijmegen–Venlo services and 3 for the Nijmegen–Kleve service, although the latter never stopped there. In 2006, a busway was opened over the site of the third track all the way from the Nijmegen's main station to Heyendaal station.

== Train services ==
The following local train services call at this station:

- Stoptrein: Nijmegen–Venlo–Roermond
- Stoptrein: Nijmegen–Venray

== Bus services ==
A bus stop near the station, called Station Heyendaal, is used by both urban and regional bus services operated by Breng.

- 9: Nijmegen (Centraal Station)–Station Heyendaal–Hatert–Overasselt–Nederasselt–Grave
- 10: Nijmegen (Centraal Station)–Station Heyendaal–University–University Medical Center–Station Heyendaal–Nijmegen (Centraal Station) (Shuttle Bus)
- 11: Beuningen–Brabantse Poort–Station Nijmegen Goffert–University–Station Heyendaal –Nijmegen (Centraal Station)
- 12: Druten–Station Nijmegen Goffert–University–Station Heyendaal –Nijmegen (Centraal Station)
- 14: Brakkenstein–University–Station Heyendaal–Nijmegen (Centraal Station)–Plein 1944–Lent–Oosterhout–Elst–Arnhem CS
- 15: Lent–Plein 1944–Nijmegen (Centraal Station)–Station Heyendaal–University–CWZ Hospital–Station Dukenburg–Wijchen South–Wijchen
- 300: Arnhem CS–Huissen–Bemmel–Lent–Plein 1944–Nijmegen CS–Station Heyendaal–University–Radboud UMC–HAN Hogeschool
