= Mook-Molenhoek railway station =

Railway station in the Netherlands

Mook-Molenhoek

General information
- Location: Netherlands
- Coordinates: 51°45′53″N 5°52′39″E
- Line: Nijmegen–Venlo railway

Services
Preceding station	Arriva Netherlands	Following station
Nijmegen Heyendaal towards Nijmegen	Stoptrein 32200	Cuijk towards Roermond
Nijmegen Heyendaal towards Nijmegen	Stoptrein 32300	Cuijk towards Venray
Location
- Location within Netherlands

Mook-Molenhoek is a railway station in the southeastern Netherlands, in Molenhoek. The station originally opened on 1 June 1883 and is located on the Maaslijn (Nijmegen–Venlo). It was closed between 15 May 1938 and 15 May 1940 and finally closed on 1 October 1940. The station was re-opened on 6 May 2009. The services are currently operated by Arriva.

The station first opened as Mook, but was renamed to Mook-Middelaar in 1891 and to Mook-Molenhoek in 2009. The original station had a station building, but this was demolished in 1975 and has not been replaced.

== Train services ==
The following local train services call at this station:

- Stoptrein: Nijmegen–Venlo–Roermond
- Stoptrein: Nijmegen–Venray

== Bus services ==
- 1: from Nijmegen via Malden to Molenhoek
- 564: from Mook-Molenhoek to Groesbeek
- 883: from Nijmegen via Malden, Mook-Molenhoek, Middelaar, Milsbeek and Ottersum to Gennep
