= Sidney Smeets =

Dutch lawyer and politician

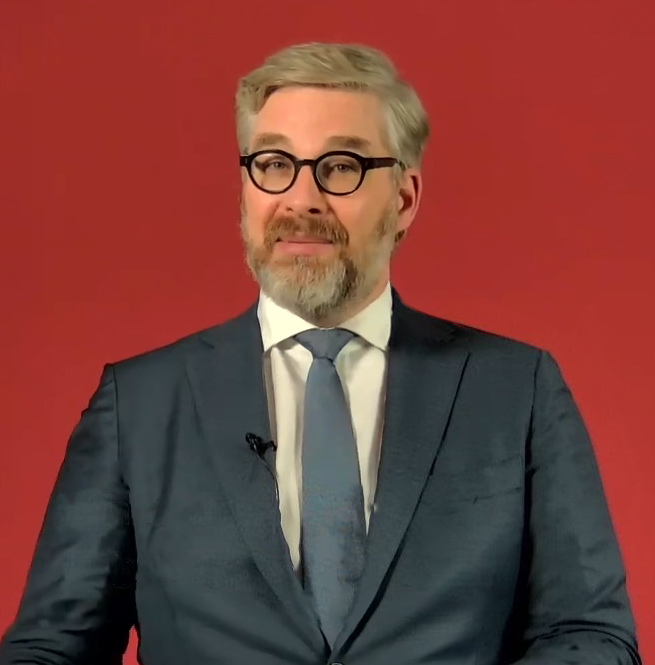
- Sidney Smeets in 2021

Member of the House of Representatives
- In office 31 March 2021 – 15 April 2021

Personal details
- Born: Sidney Florens Johannes Smeets; 18 June 1975 (age 51) Heerlen, Netherlands
- Party: D66 (until 2021)
- Other political affiliations: VVD
- Education: Leiden University; Utrecht University

Sidney Florens Johannes Smeets (born 18 June 1975) is a Dutch lawyer, writer and former politician. Following the 2021 Dutch general election, Smeets was inaugurated as a member of the Dutch House of Representatives on 31 March 2021 for Democrats 66 (D66). On 15 April 2021 Smeets resigned following allegations of sexually inappropriate behaviour towards minors.

== Biography ==
=== Early life ===
Sidney Smeets was born on 18 June 1975 in Heerlen. Smeets studied law at Leiden University and history at Utrecht University. During his student days, he was active in the JOVD and served as a personal assistant to Erica Terpstra, then a member of the People's Party for Freedom and Democracy (VVD) parliamentary group in the House of Representatives.

=== Legal career ===
Smeets was sworn in as a lawyer in 2001 and subsequently worked as a lawyer/partner at a Utrecht law firm. From 2009 to April 2021, he was a lawyer at Spong Advocaten, located on the Keizersgracht in Amsterdam. Smeets primarily handled sex offences and serious crime cases and represented defendants in various nationally known cases. He represented coffeeshop owner Johan van Laarhoven, who was convicted in Thailand for tax fraud and money laundering. He also represented one of the defendants in the Amsterdam sex crimes case, and defended one of the defendants in the Linesman Case, in which a referee died the day after a fight at a youth match. He also provided assistance to victims of anti-LGBTQ violence.

In his capacity as a lawyer, Smeets frequently wrote opinion pieces in national newspapers and online media. He also appeared regularly on radio and television. In 2014, Smeets was one of the signatories of a newspaper appeal urging the government not to ban the Vereniging MARTIJN. Smeets also defended the association as a lawyer in 2014, as well as the association's former chairman, Marthijn Uittenbogaard, following a summons in March 2021.

=== Writings ===
Together with former colleagues Gerard Spong and Tim Vis, Smeets wrote the book De hypocrisie van de achterdeur in 2012, a critique of Dutch drug policy based on their own experiences in the courtroom.

In 2013, on the occasion of the commemoration of the 75th anniversary of Kristallnacht, Smeets wrote the book De verlangensdaad. Through archival research based on, among other sources, original French and German court records and the diaries of Joseph Goebbels, Smeets described the life story of Herschel Grynszpan, bringing previously unknown facts to light.

=== Political career ===
Smeets was placed eighteenth on the D66 candidate list for the 2021 Dutch general election. He received 2,039 preferential votes. D66 won 24 seats and he was sworn in as a Member of Parliament on March 31, 2021. Within the parliamentary group, Smeets was assigned the portfolio of Justice, Drugs, Asylum, and Migration.

On 31 March 2021, the day of his swearing-in as a Member of Parliament, D66 party leadership received an official report regarding inappropriate behavior by Smeets. The party established an internal investigative committee on 14 April 2021, following several underage boys accusing Smeets of sexually inappropriate behavior.

A day later, Smeets resigned as a Member of Parliament due to these accusations. Subsequently, the investigation was halted, as Smeets was no longer a Member of Parliament.

=== Subsequent career ===
In April 2021, Spong Advocaten announced that Smeets' employment had ended as of May 1 and that he would not be returning to the law firm. On May 14, 2021, Smeets announced that hehad started a firm under his own name, specializing in criminal law, victims' rights, cassation, and general practice.
