= Vierlingsbeek railway station =

Railway station in the Netherlands

Vierlingsbeek
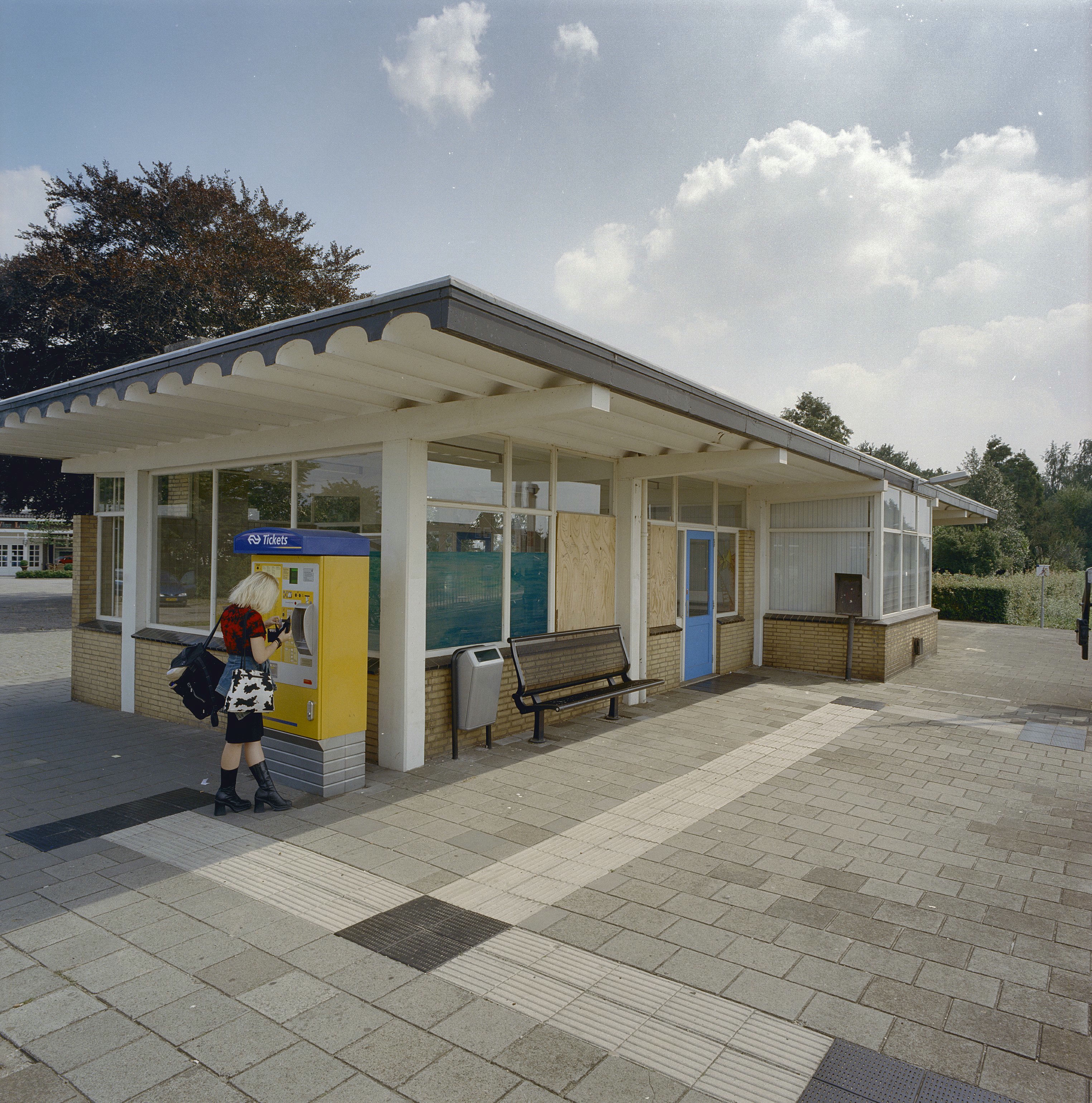

General information
- Location: Netherlands
- Coordinates: 51°35′32″N 5°59′48″E
- Line: Nijmegen–Venlo railway

History
- Opened: 1882

Services
| Preceding station | Arriva Netherlands | Following station |
|---|---|---|
| Boxmeer towards Nijmegen | Stoptrein 32200 | Venray towards Roermond |
| Boxmeer towards Nijmegen | Stoptrein 32300 | Venray Terminus |
Location
- Location within Netherlands

Vierlingsbeek is a railway station located in Vierlingsbeek, Netherlands. It is situated on the Nijmegen–Venlo railway. The train services are operated by Arriva. The station building was demolished in 2004.

== Train services ==
The following local train services call at this station:

- Stoptrein: Nijmegen–Venlo–Roermond
- Stoptrein: Nijmegen–Venray
