= Cuijk =

- Town
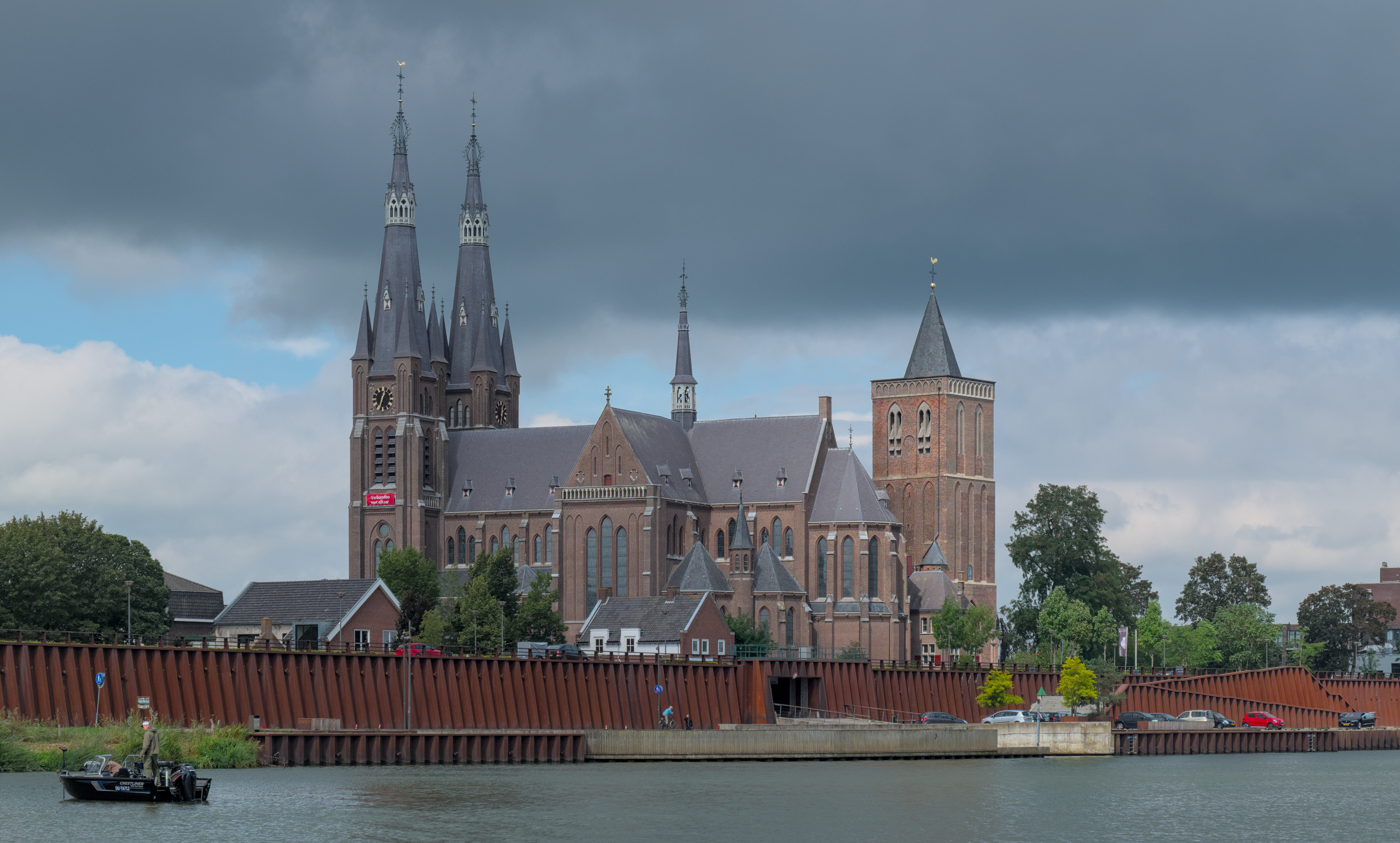
- St. Martin's Church dominates the skyline on the Meuse

- Location in the province of North Brabant in the Netherlands Cuijk (Netherlands)
- Coordinates: 51.729630°N 5.881015°E
- Country: Netherlands
- Province: North Brabant
- Municipality: Land van Cuijk

Area
  - Total: 9.55 km^{2} (3.69 sq mi)
- Elevation: 10 m (33 ft)

Population (2021)
  - Total: 18,375
  - Density: 1,920/km^{2} (4,980/sq mi)
- Time zone: UTC+1 (CET)
  - Summer (DST): UTC+2 (CEST)
- Postal code: 5431 & 5432
- Dialing code: 0485

Cuijk (dialect: Kuuk) is a town in the northeastern part of the province of North Brabant, Netherlands. It is the successor of a Roman settlement on the west bank of the Meuse, 13 km (8.1 mi) south of Nijmegen. Cuijk, which had a population of 18,170 as of 2020, was the centre of an eponymous municipality, which ceased to exist on 1 January 2022, when it was replaced by the larger Land van Cuijk municipality.

== Origin of the name ==
The name Cuijk seems to be derived from the Celtic Keukja, meaning curve or bend. This refers to a bend in the Meuse near Cuijk. The Romans transformed Keukja to Ceuclum, leading to the later Dutch name Cuijk.

== History ==
=== Prehistory ===
Some centuries before the Romans arrived, the area was already relatively densely populated. Part of the Celtic culture is known through archaeology, e.g. the way they took care of their deceased. They had cattle and worked the land in a primitive way. They lived in large wood huts or barns.

On the 'Kampse Veld' in nearby Haps a settlement from about 700 BC was found in the early 20th century. Prehistoric remains were also found in Cuijk itself: In 1844 many round burial mounds from the Bronze Age were found near Haanhof. These were from the Urnfield culture, as they contained urns with human ashes. In 1825 similar finds had been discovered on the Kalkhof.

=== Roman Ceuclum ===
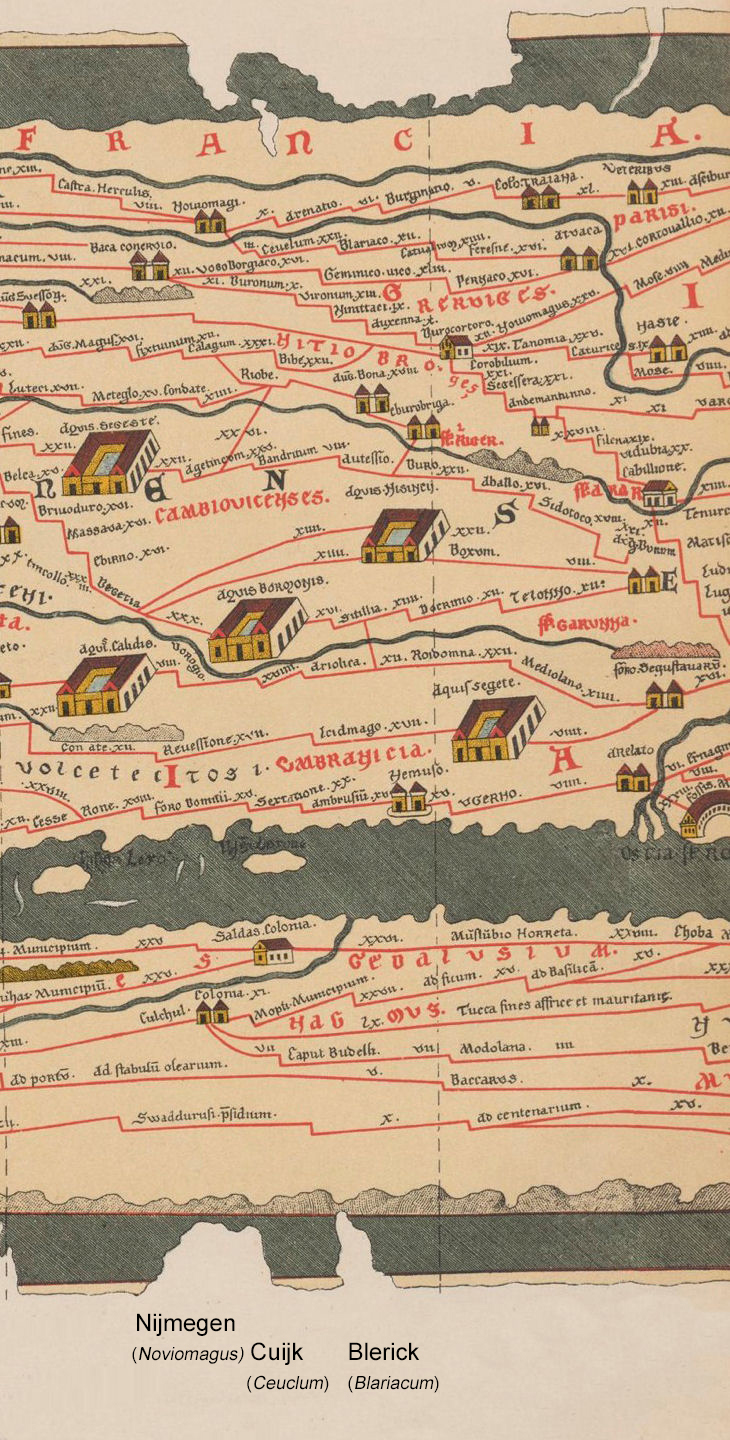
Part of the Peutinger map depicting Ceuclum

After Julius Caesar had conquered Gaul in about 50 BC, the Roman influence reached up to the Rhine, which flowed through Utrecht at the time. The Rhine itself was guarded by the limes, a string of castella connected by roads.

From the limes, a road led south to Nijmegen and Tongeren via Cuijk. In the 20th century many remains of this road were found near Cuijk and Sint Agatha, and further south. Ceuclum and the road are shown on the Peutinger map. In the late fourth century, a bridge over the Meuse was constructed at Cuijk, part of the road. In 1992 remains of the bridge were discovered. Foundations of a Roman castellum near St Martin's church were discovered in 1937, 1939 and 1949. Other finds relate to Gallo-Roman temples and a bath house. Merovingian and Carolingian pottery imply continuous habitation at Cuijk after the Roman era.

=== Medieval times ===
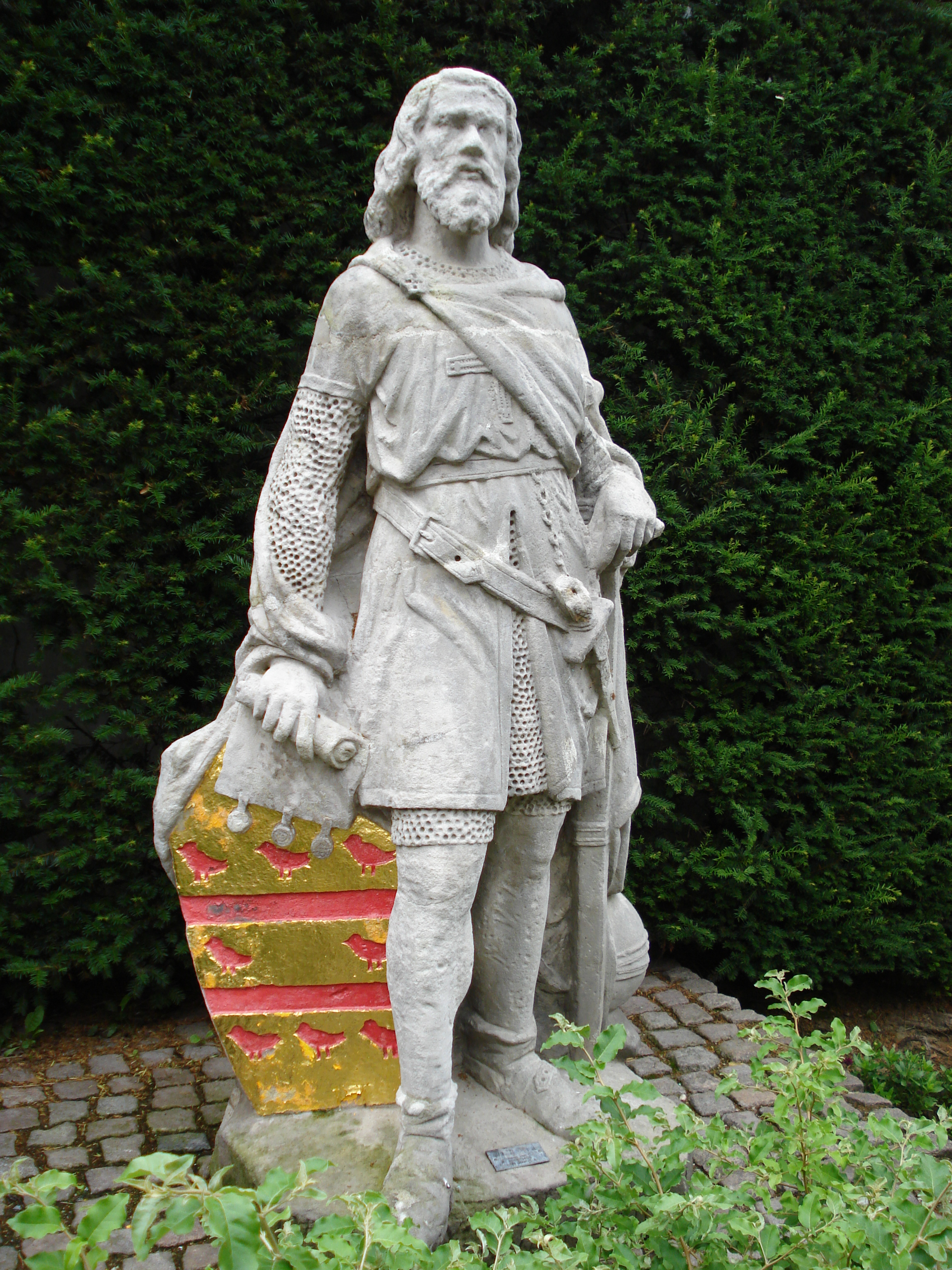
Statue of Jan I van Cuijk

The Lords of Cuijk can be traced back to the 11th century. The Lords of Cuijk established the Heerlijkheid Cuijk, and tried to maintain their independence from the bigger counties and duchies. In about 1133 Cuijk castle was destroyed, and the center of the lordship was moved to Grave. Jan I van Cuijk (1230-1308) was the most important lord, and brought Cuijk under the influence of the Duchy of Brabant. Even though the lord resided in Grave, the diet of the Heerlijkheid Cuijk and its highest court remained in Cuijk.

=== Eighty Years' War and Republic ===
During the Eighty Years' War (1568-1648) Grave was taken by the Spanish in 1586, and retaken by the Dutch Republic in 1602. From then till the peace of 1648 Cuijk was in an uncertain position. At the peace it became part of the Dutch Republic, or more precisely the part of Brabant that it controlled. The mainly Catholic population was then limited in the exercise of its religion.

In 1712 a large fire burned down part of Cuijk. In 1795 the Catholics regained the parish church of Cuijk. In 1809 the Protestant church was built.

=== Nineteenth century ===
The Meuse often flooded the surroundings of Cuijk. This was especially the case in 1820, 1861, 1880 and 1926. It made the town rather isolated for part of the year. In 1883 the Nijmegen–Venlo railway was opened. Cuijk got a railway station, and reliable connections to the rest of the country. In 1883 it also got an official post office.

=== Industrialization ===
Most of the population of Cuijk worked in agriculture till very late in the nineteenth century. The wild grounds surrounding the town were brought into cultivation relatively late. The position of Cuijk as the center of an agricultural area was marked by the many annual markets for fabric, cattle and the like. It also had some industry. In about 1860 Johannes van Susteren made weighing scales and coffee grinders. Other companies made safes and fire hoses. There were two breweries, and workplaces where organs, church ornaments, and candles were made. In 1907 the dairy firm N.V. Cuijksche Melkproductenfabriek 'Lacto' was in Cuijk. In 1924 it was bought by Nutricia, and started to specialize in nutrition for children.

The tobacco industry was the most important industry in Cuijk. Tobacco was cultivated in the surroundings, and cigars were made. In 1859 the factory of J. Baars & Zonen from Krommenie opened a factory in Cuijk. The Baars factory made the 'Victor Hugo' cigars. In 1930 it employed 146 males, 31 females and 41 children.

Due to the abundant presence of cattle, there were multiple tanneries in Cuijk. The most famous was the one founded by Regouin in 1838. A hundred years later, in 1938, it became the Koninklijke Leder- en Drijfriemenfabriek, which specialized in mechanical belts. By then it processed 20,000 hides a year. Many of these came from Java, and could easily be transported via the Meuse.

=== Post World War II ===
Cuijk was liberated on 17 September 1944, but the other side of the Meuse remained occupied till March 1945. It led to artillery bombardments and destruction in Cuijk. After the war the location on the Meuse, and the railway brought many companies to Cuijk. The Meuse harbor Haven van Cuijk was dug near the hamlet Katwijk, and a large industrial area was created. The population grew from 5,645 in 1950 to 15,300 in 1975.

== Notable buildings ==
- St Martin's Church, a Gothic Revival architecture church built 1911-1913
- Tower of the preceding Gothic St Martin's church from 1480, home to Museum Ceuclum
- The Protestant church on the corner of Markt and Grotestraat is a small neo classical building from 1809
- The Joods monument from 1985 contains the rear façade of the former Synagogue of Cuijk
- Former Regouin tannery at Grotestraat 3
- Former cigar factory Kansas at Kerkstraat 7, now a café.
- Windmill Jan van Cuijk, which also served as a bark mill
- Fabrikantenwoning at Stationsstraat 8, built for the tanner family Regouin.
- Meuse Boulevard, constructed in about 2007, and meant to restore the contact Cuijk and the Meuse. From the Meuse Boulevard there is a view towards parts of the heath of Mookerheide and the Reichswald on the other side of the Meuse.

=== Gallery ===
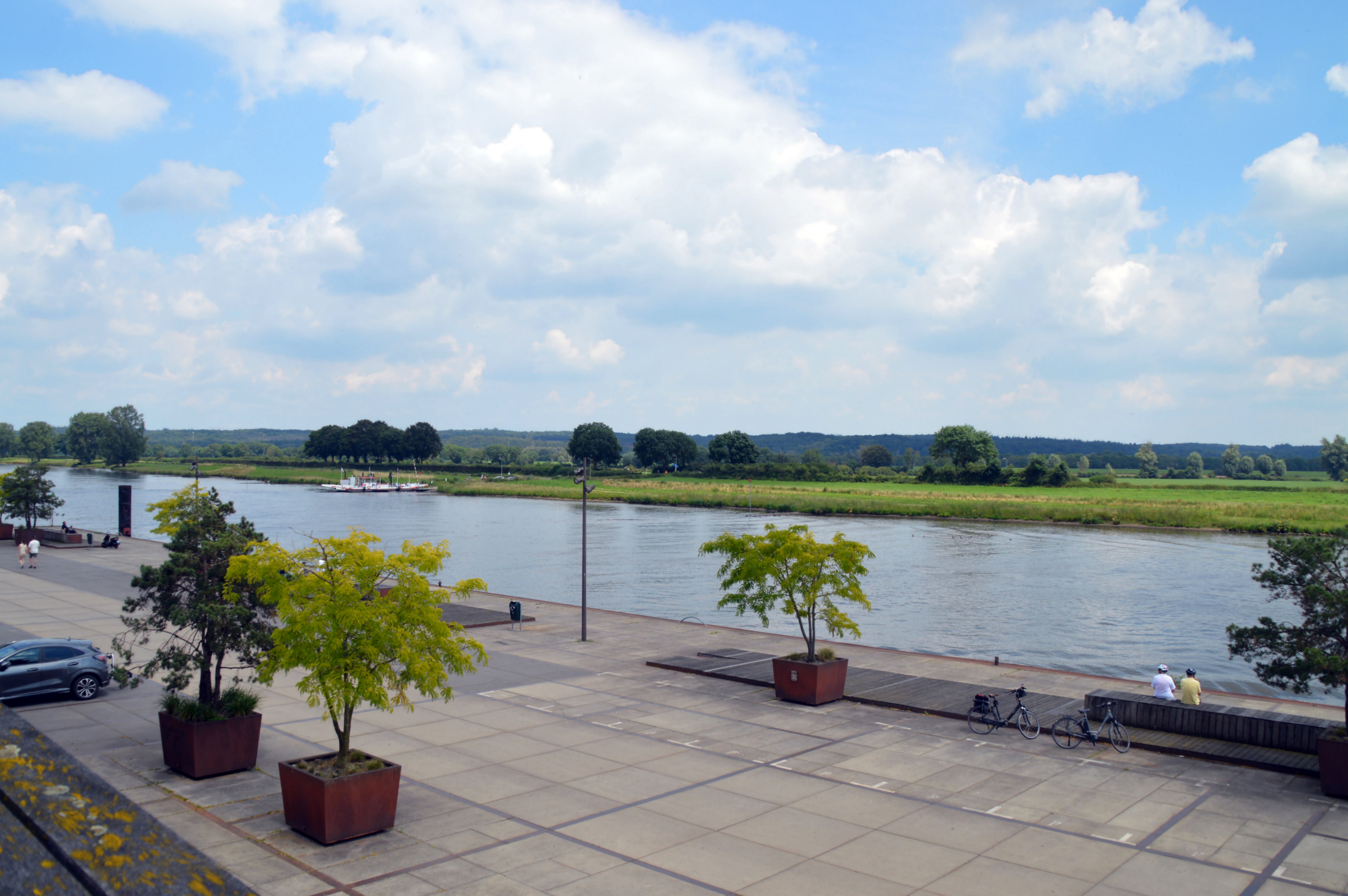

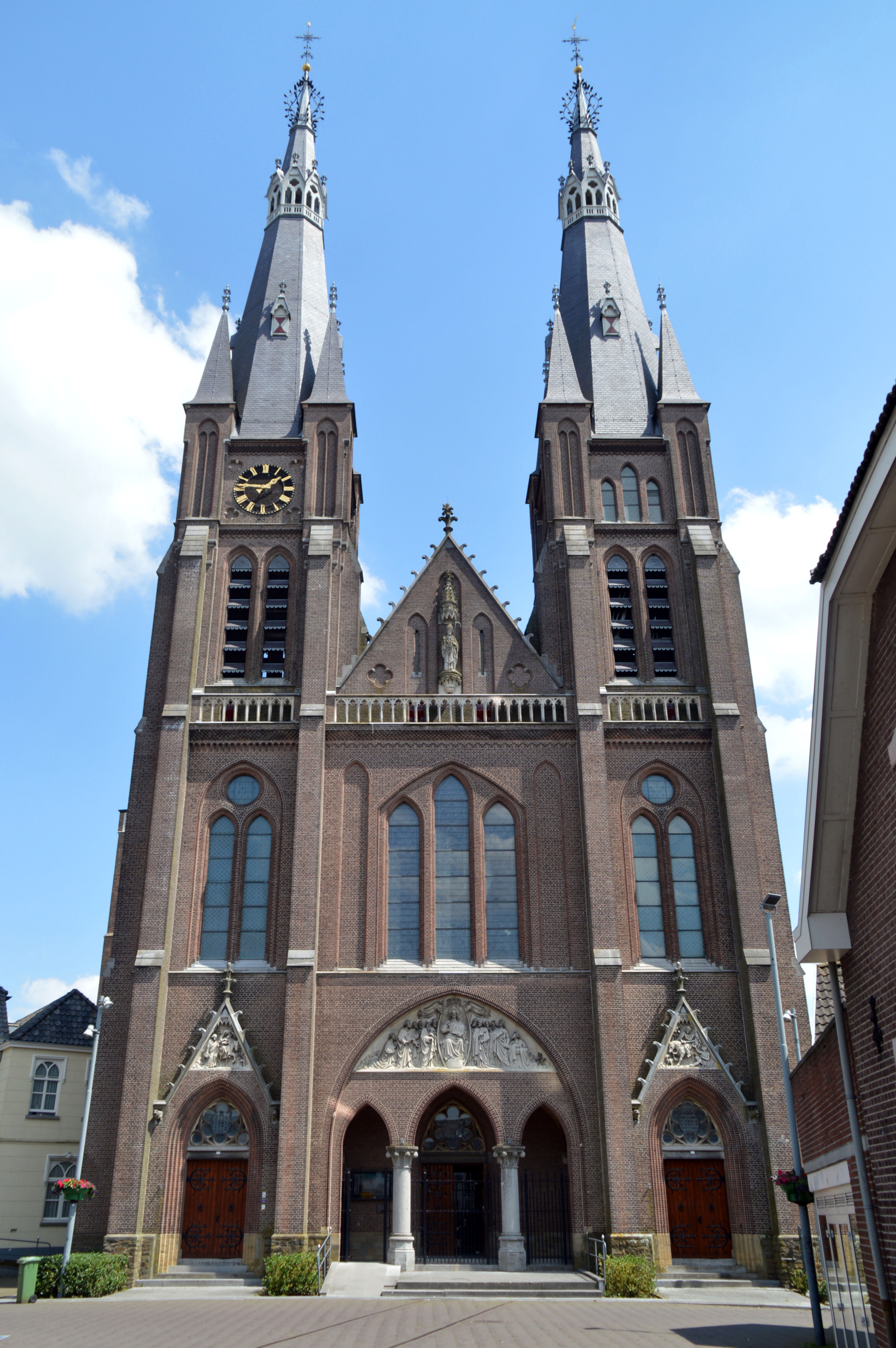

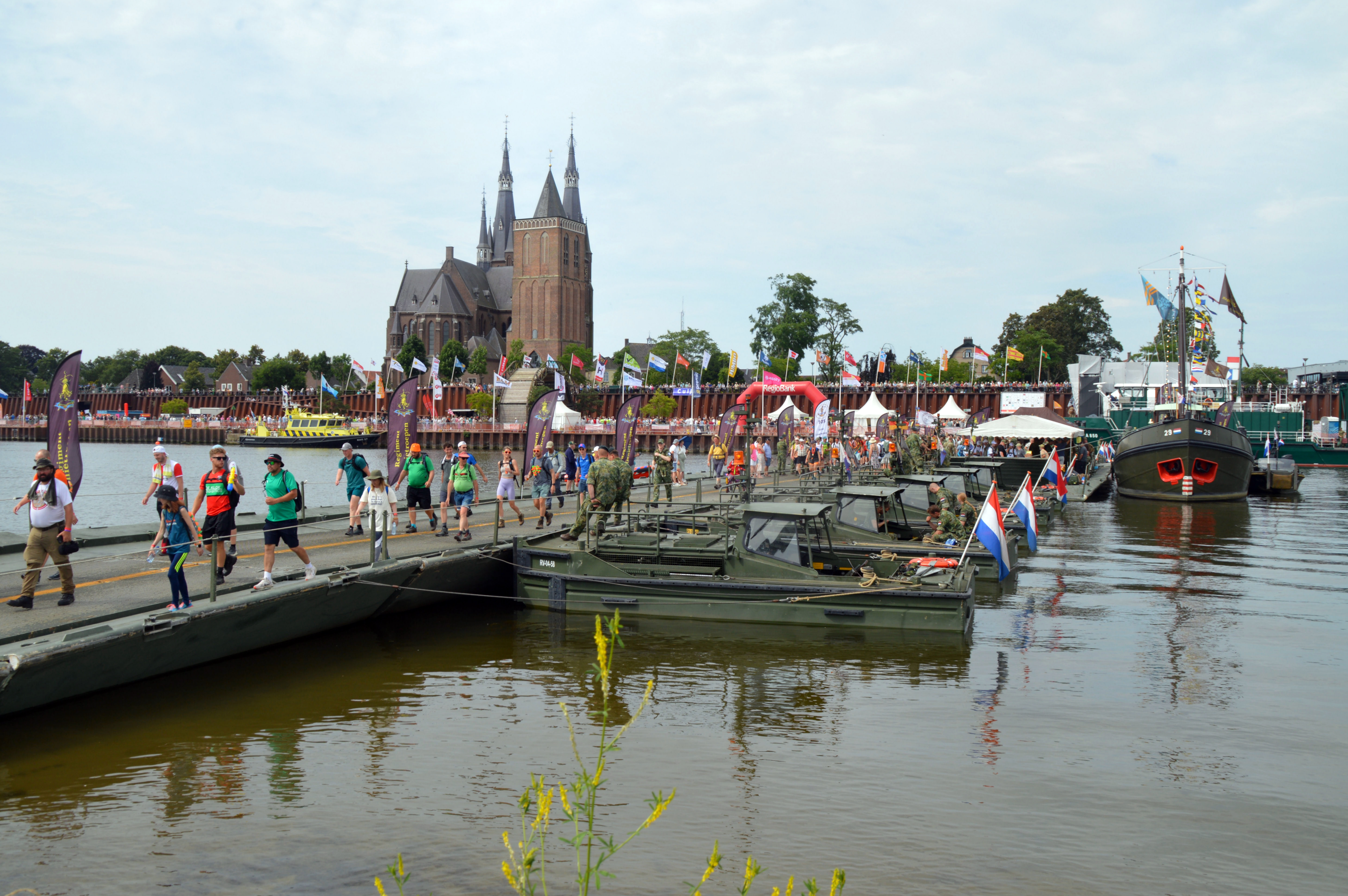

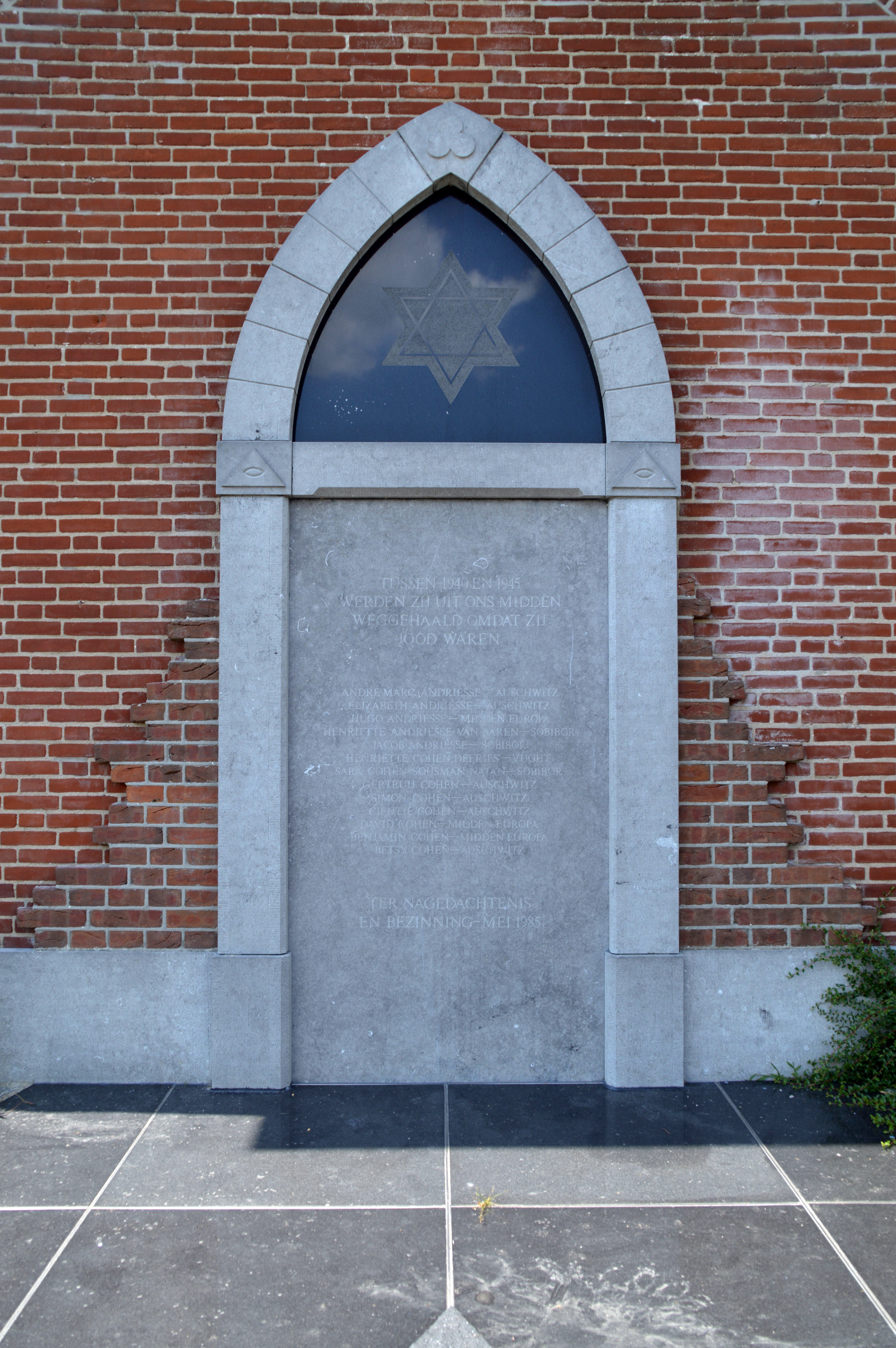

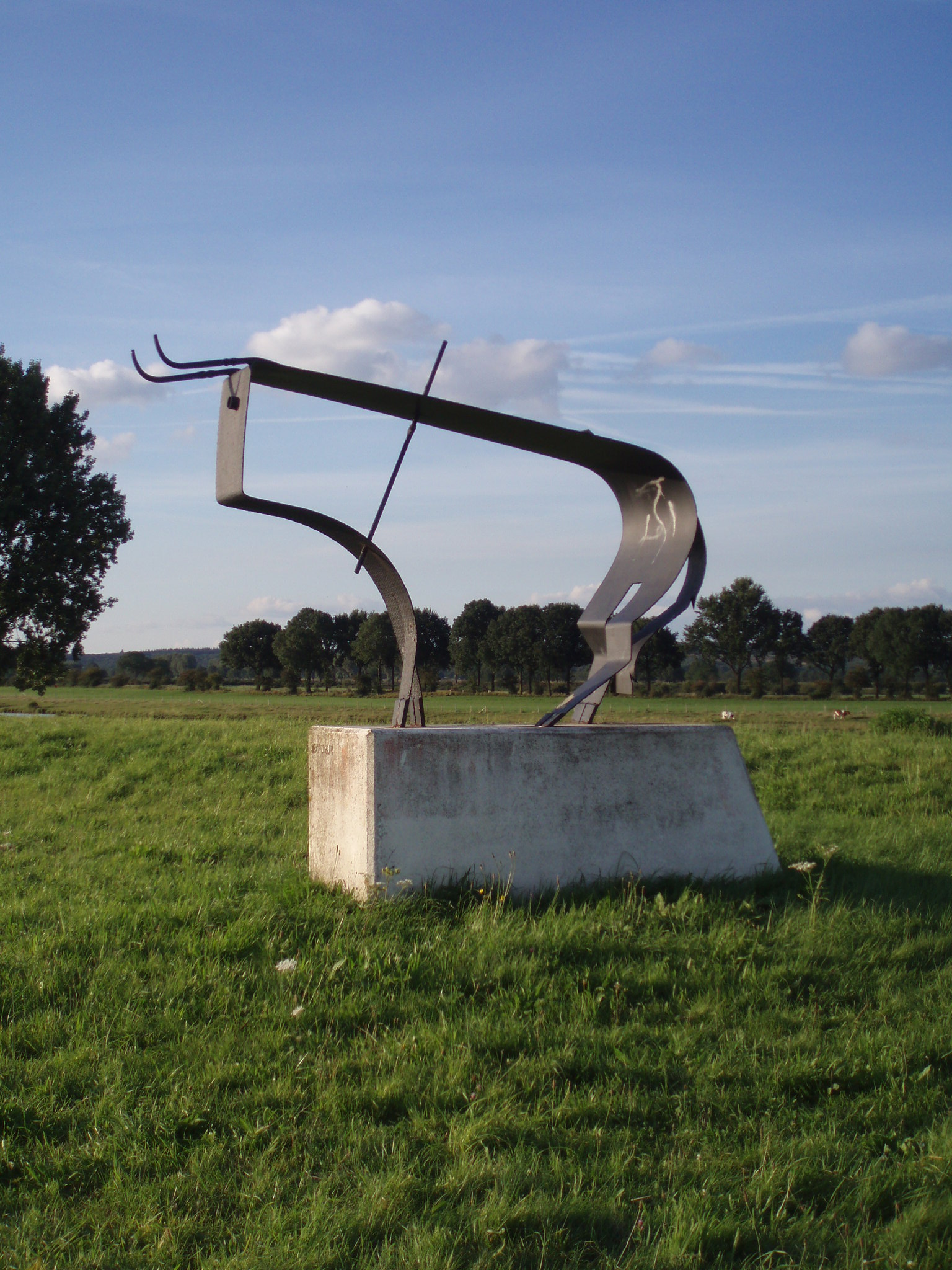

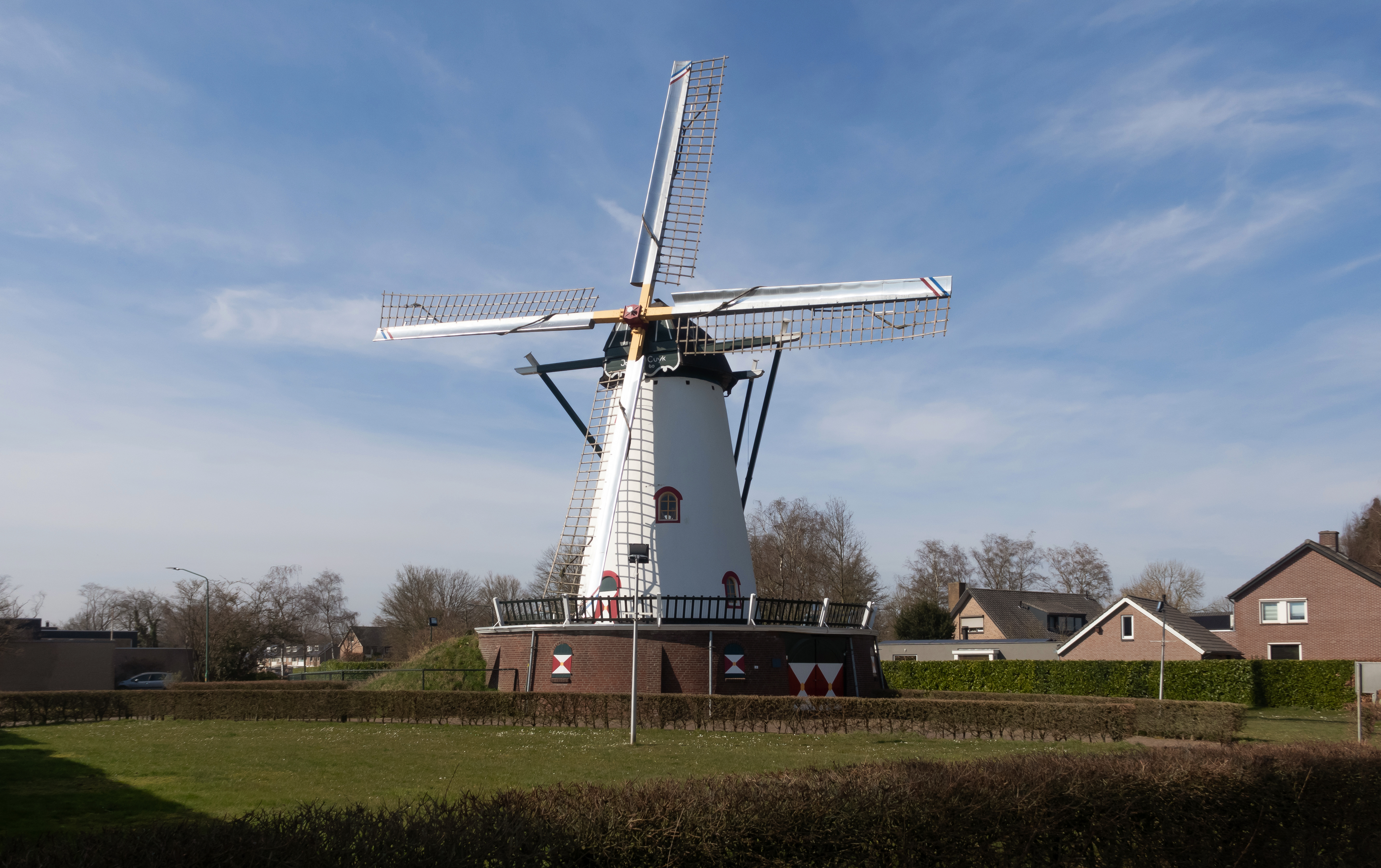

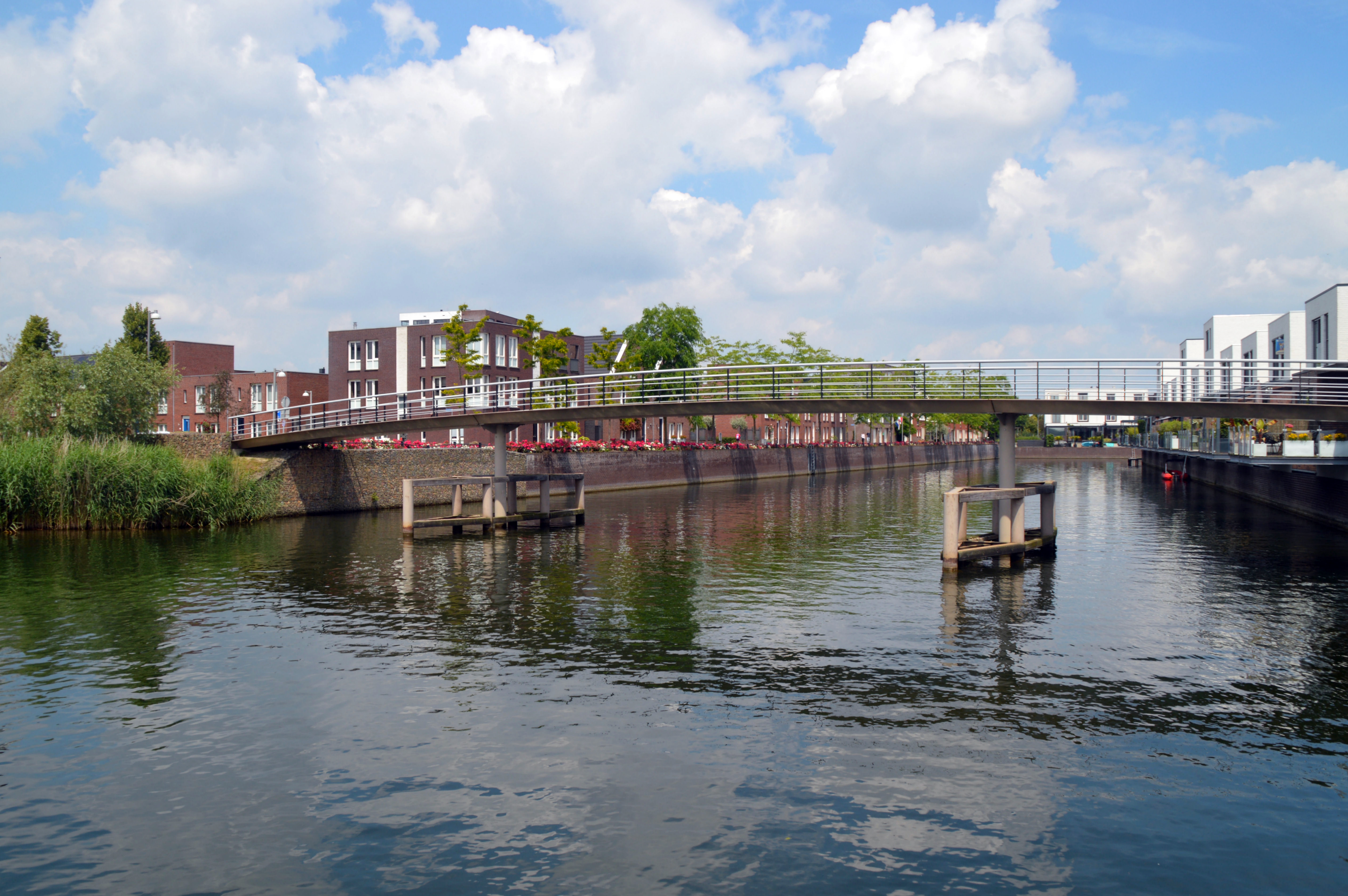

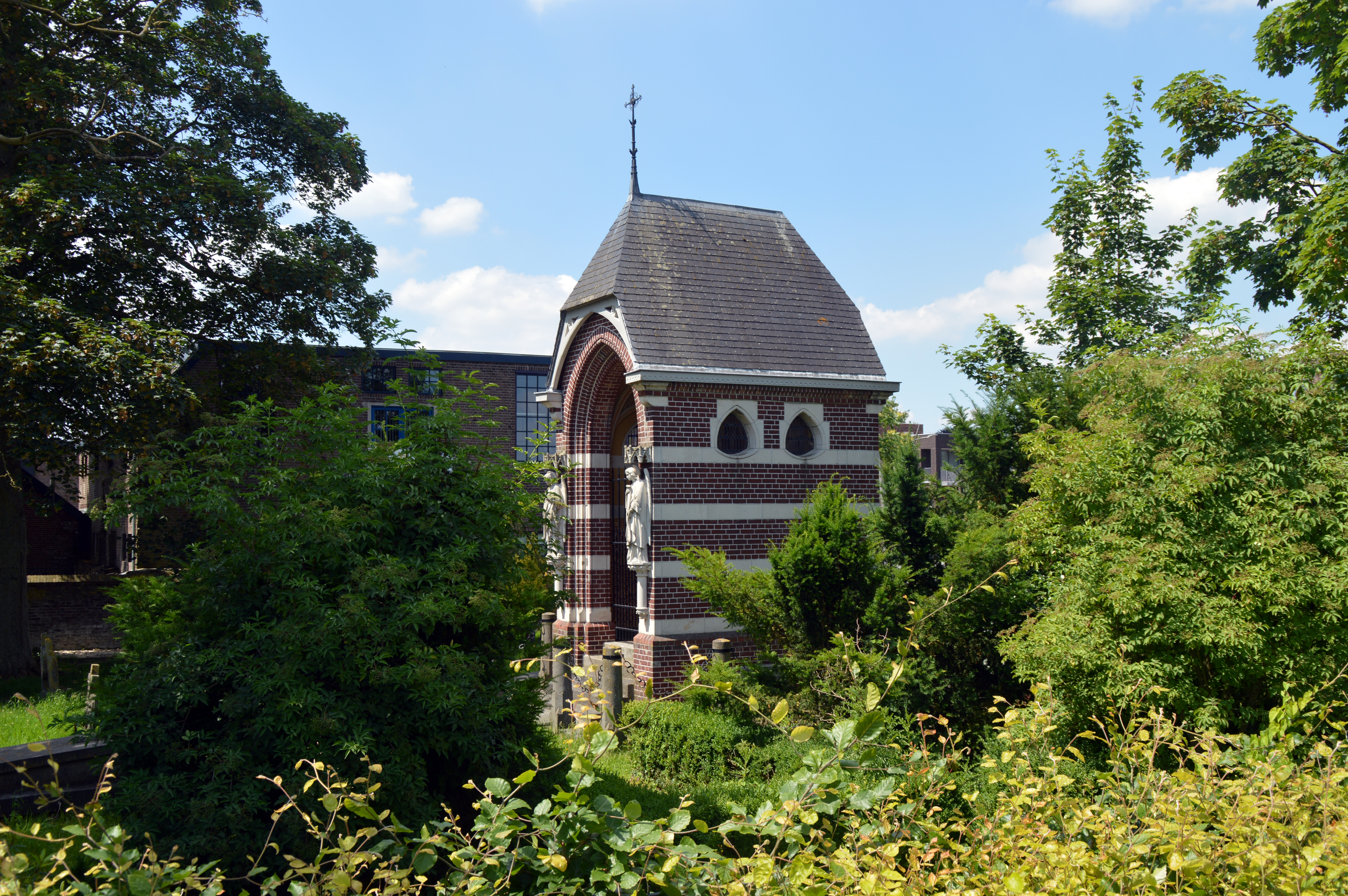

== Musea ==
- Museum Ceuclum, a history museum in the old tower of St Martin's

== Nature and landscape ==
Cuijk is located directly on the Meuse. Just south of Cuijk is the nature reserve Zevenhutten of 85 hectares, owned by Brabants Landschap.

== Transport ==
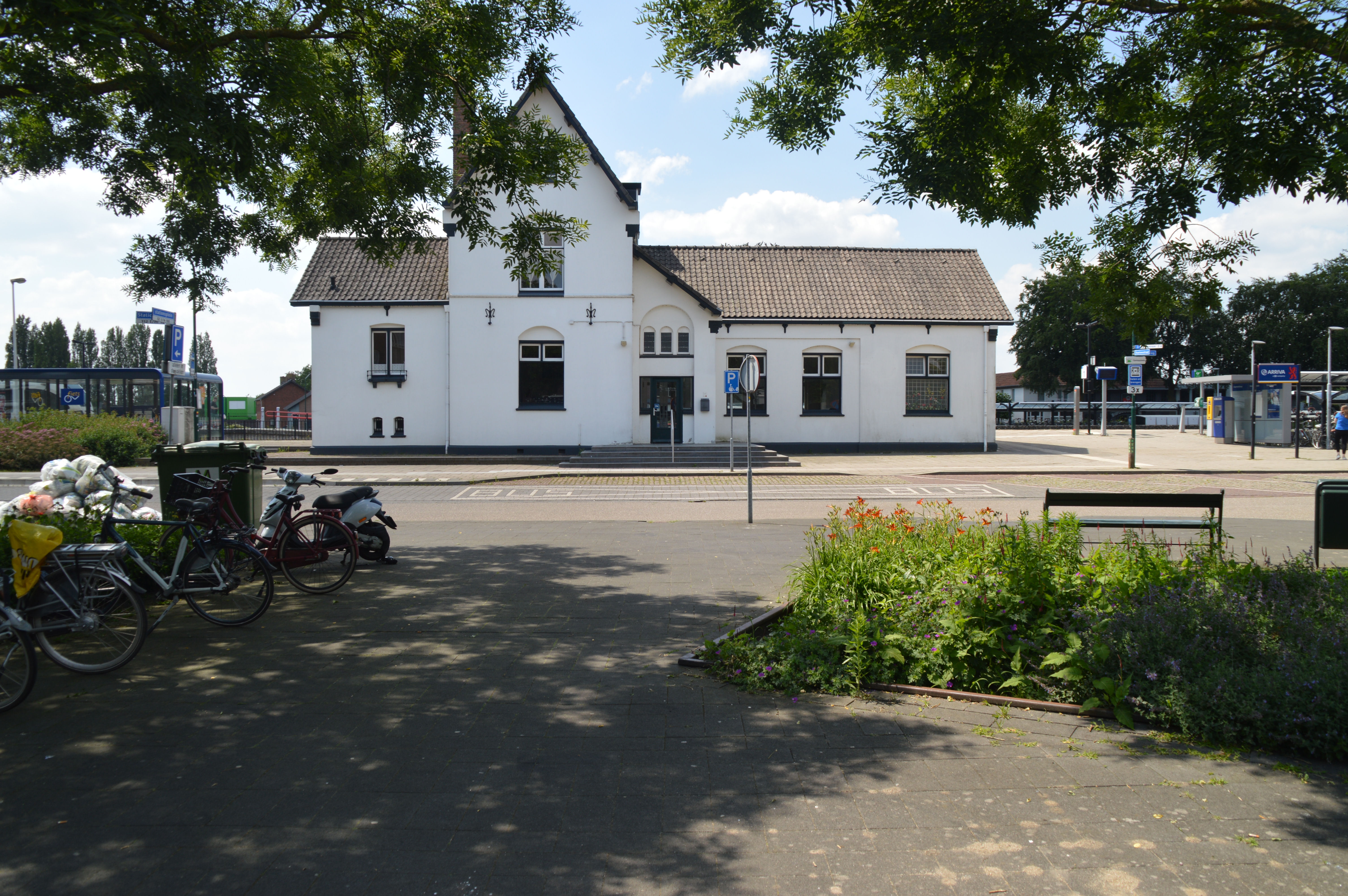
Station Cuijk (1882)

The close by A73 motorway is the main connection of Cuijk. Cuijk railway station is popular with the many commuters to Nijmegen. The Spes Mea of the ferry service Cuijk - Middelaar crosses the Meuse to Limburg.

The Meuse harbor is important for bulk transport, and has a container terminal.

== Twin towns and sister cities ==
- (United Kingdom) Maldon
- (France) Lalinde
- (Czech Republic) Přerov
