= The Grass Company =

Coffeeshop company in the Netherlands

- Company logo
- Industry: Cannabis coffeeshops
- Area served: North Brabant, Netherlands
- Key people: Johan van Laarhoven
- Website: https://www.thegrasscompany.com

The Grass Company is a company in North Brabant, Netherlands that operates four coffeeshops in the cities of 's-Hertogenbosch and Tilburg. The Grass Company was the first company to open a coffeeshop in the south of the Netherlands combining cannabis sales with restaurants.

== Police raids ==
After a raid in 2011, the police reported finding 15,000 joints and eight kilos of hemp in a distribution center of the chain. According to the shop's lawyer, this was 250 grams. The shop was not prosecuted and two employees were found guilty with no sentence. The court thereby approved the presence of two day stocks for the four coffee shops. In May 2013, the company was the subject of an investigation into black money. On July 4, 2014, raids took place in twenty buildings, including the four coffee shops and the TGC Trading office. One of the coffee shops was closed for six months because there were 7.5 kilograms of soft drugs in the building.

== Case against founder Johan van Laarhoven ==
On July 14, 2014, the Netherlands requested the Thai authorities to cooperate in an investigation against The Grass Company founder and former owner Johan van Laarhoven, who had been living in Thailand since 2008. The Thai police responded to this with the arrest of Van Laarhoven and his Thai wife. In Thailand, Van Laarhoven was sentenced to 103 years in prison for money laundering the money earned from the coffee shop, of which he must serve 20. His wife was also sentenced to prison. MPs from D66, PvdA, SP, GroenLinks, Party for the Animals, Group Bontes / Van Klaveren, 50Plus, fraction Houwers and fraction Klein asked parliamentary questions about the case and the role of the Netherlands in the arrest of Van Laarhoven. Attorney Gerard Spong and former Spuiten en Slikken presenter Filemon Wesselink made efforts to ensure his release. The National Ombudsman also wrote a critical report. In April 2019, justice minister Ferdinand Grapperhaus promised to make an effort to bring Van Laarhoven to the Netherlands. In August of that year, Grapperhaus traveled to Thailand to negotiate with the Thai authorities. In January 2020, Van Laarhoven was handed over to the Netherlands to serve the rest of the sentence in the Netherlands (a petition for pardon was filed for this) and for prosecution in the Netherlands for tax fraud and money laundering. Cases against van Laarhoven for fraud and laundering were dropped in late 2024.
