= Schoevers =

Secretarial school in the Netherlands

Schoevers Institute
- Netherlands

Information
- Founded: 1913
- Website: https://www.schoevers.nl/

Instituut Schoevers, known commonly as Schoevers, is a privately owned educational institution in the Netherlands, training students mainly for administrative positions. It was founded in Amsterdam in 1913, and launched a secretarial course in 1922 for young women.

== History ==
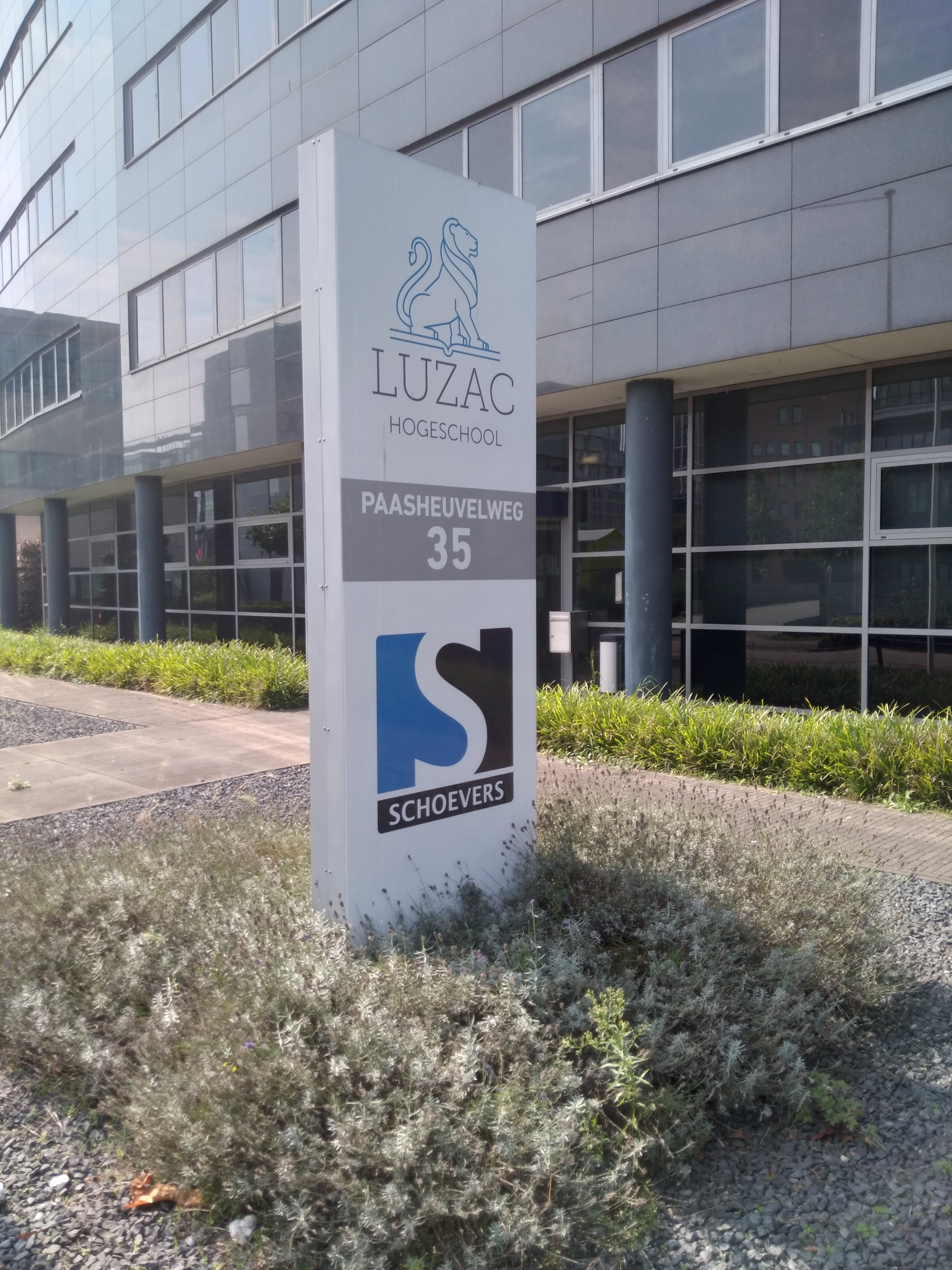
Schoevers and Luzac College located at Paasheuvelweg, Amsterdam-Zuidoost (August 2021)

The institute was founded by Adriaan Schoevers in January 1913 as a school for trade and office. Administrative work at that time was mostly conducted by men, but this began to shift from that point on.

Schoevers believed that training should be enjoyed with pleasure, and taught the girls to type blindly to the rhythm of the Charleston.
