= Gerard Spong =

Dutch lawyer of Surinamese descent (born 1946)

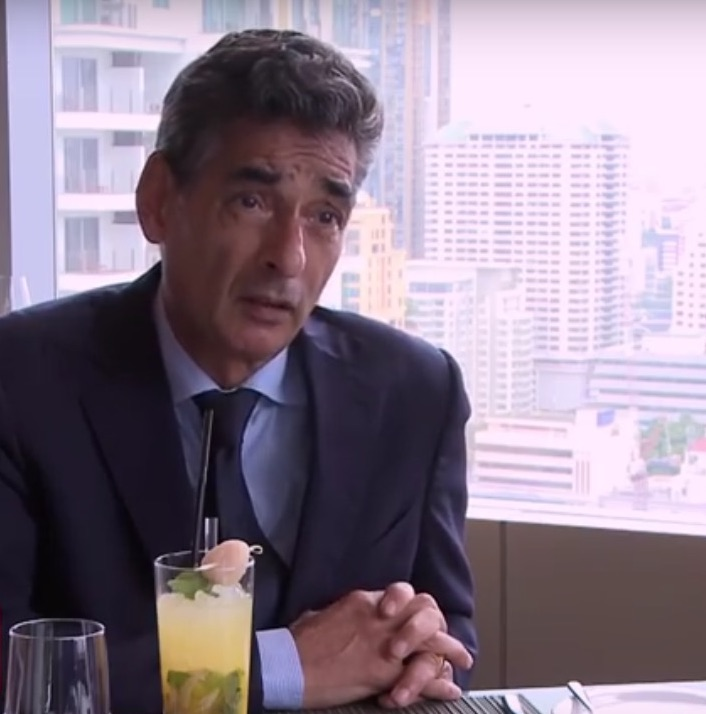
- Gerard Spong in 2015
- Born: Gerard Spong; 9 June 1946 (age 79); Paramaribo, Suriname
- Occupation: Lawyer
- Years active: 1973–present

Gerard Spong (born 9 June 1946) is a Dutch lawyer of Surinamese descent.

== Biography ==
Spong was born in Paramaribo, Suriname. He was a cousin of film director Pim de la Parra. In 1962, he moved to Oegstgeest in the Netherlands. From 1967 to 1973, he studied political science and law in Amsterdam. After graduating, he returned to Paramaribo, where he was sworn in as a lawyer. In 1976, he returned to Amsterdam. With Mischa Wladimiroff, he started the law firm Wladimiroff & Spong Advocaten. Meanwhile, he specialized in criminal law.

In 1978, Spong defended the interests of Knut Folkerts, Christof Wackernagel and Gert Schneider, three members of the Red Army Faction who were arrested in the Netherlands in 1977 and imprisoned in Maastricht. The three appealed against an extradition request from West Germany and wanted to be seen as a political refugee. Eventually, they were transferred to Germany in October 1978.

In 1980, he defended a number of opponents of the then Surinamese dictator Desi Bouterse in Paramaribo, who had to appear before the ward council. Spong was suddenly arrested at night by Bouterse's military in his room at the Torarica hotel and was brought to Fort Zeelandia (Bouterse's headquarters). Spong was questioned here by Bouterse and Roy Horb, and released again after eleven hours. He had to leave the country immediately.

In 2008, Spong was one of the guests of College Tour, a television program where students interview a guest. The show was held at the University of Amsterdam. One of the students asked Spong why Geert Wilders, a far-right Dutch politician, had never been prosecuted for hate speech. Spong replied that public prosecutors lacked guts, and freely offered his services to file charges against Wilders on behalf of the students. The Public Prosecution Service decided not to prosecute, therefore, Spong filed an Article 12 sv-procedure forcing a prosecution. In 2011, Wilders had to appear in court for hate speech. He was found not guilty. Spong received multiple death threats during the period. From 2015 to 2020, Spong advocated for the release of coffeshop owner Johan van Laarhoven from imprisonment in Thailand for money laundering.
