= Venray railway station =

Railway station in the Netherlands

Venray

General information
- Location: Netherlands
- Coordinates: 51°31′35″N 6°0′51″E
- Line: Nijmegen–Venlo railway

History
- Opened: 1883

Services
Preceding station	Arriva Netherlands	Following station
Vierlingsbeek towards Nijmegen	Stoptrein 32200	Blerick towards Roermond
Vierlingsbeek towards Nijmegen	Stoptrein 32300	Terminus
Location
- Location within Netherlands

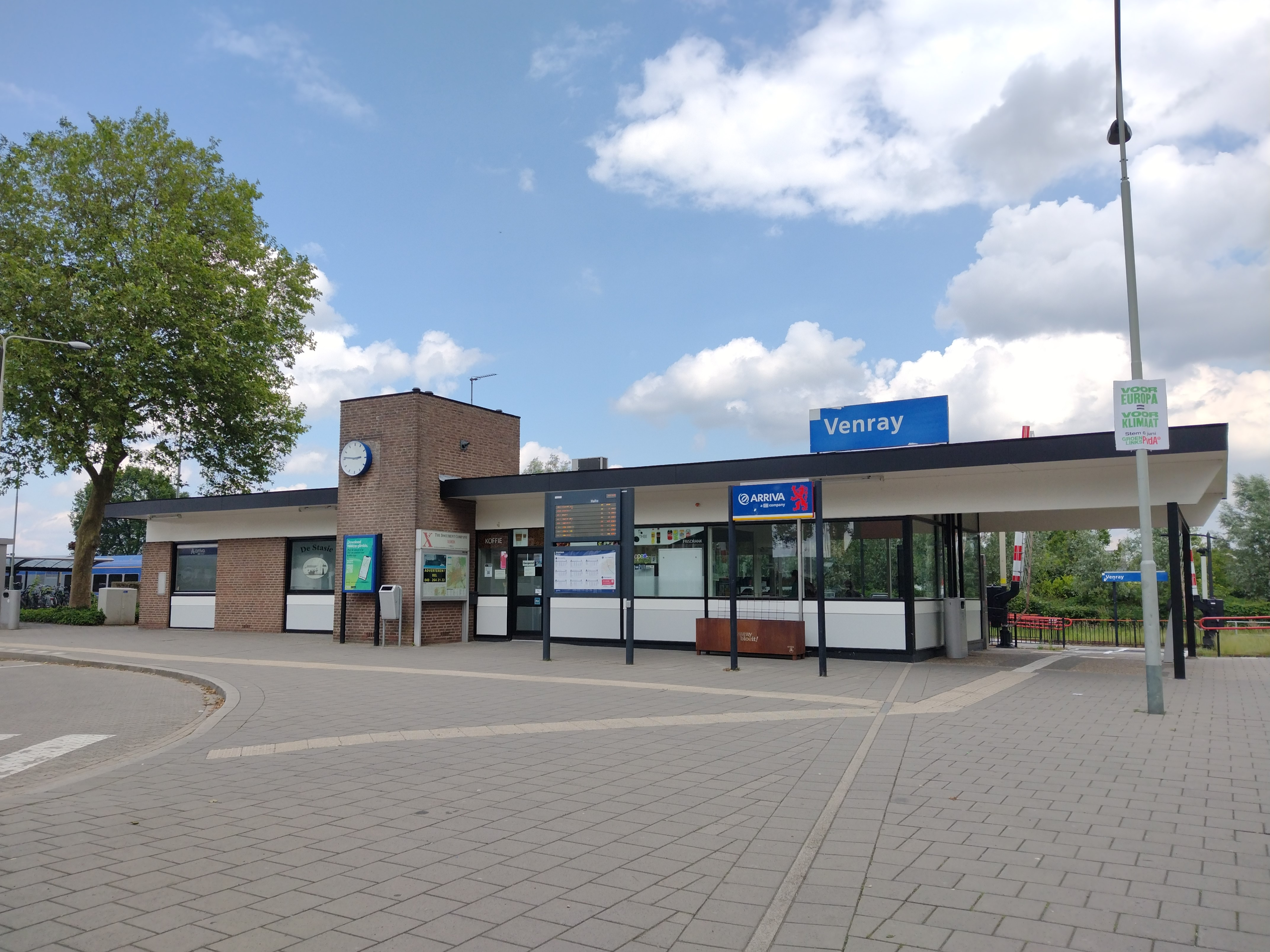
Station building of Venray

Venray is a railway station located in Venray, Netherlands. It is situated on the Nijmegen–Venlo railway. The train services are operated by Arriva.

== Train services ==
The following local train services call at this station:

- Stoptrein: Nijmegen–Venlo–Roermond
- Stoptrein: Nijmegen–Venray

== Bus services ==
- Line 80: Venlo Station–Blerick–Sevenum–Horst–Venray–Ysselsteyn–Deurne
- Line 87: Well–Wanssum–Oostrum–Venray Station–Venray–Leunen–Castenray–Horst
- Line 88: Venray Station–Oostrum–Wanssum–Meerlo–Tienray–Swolgen–Broekhuizenvorst–Broekhuizen–Lottum–Grubbenvorst–Blerick–Venlo
