= Nijmegen–Venlo railway =

Railway line in the Netherlands

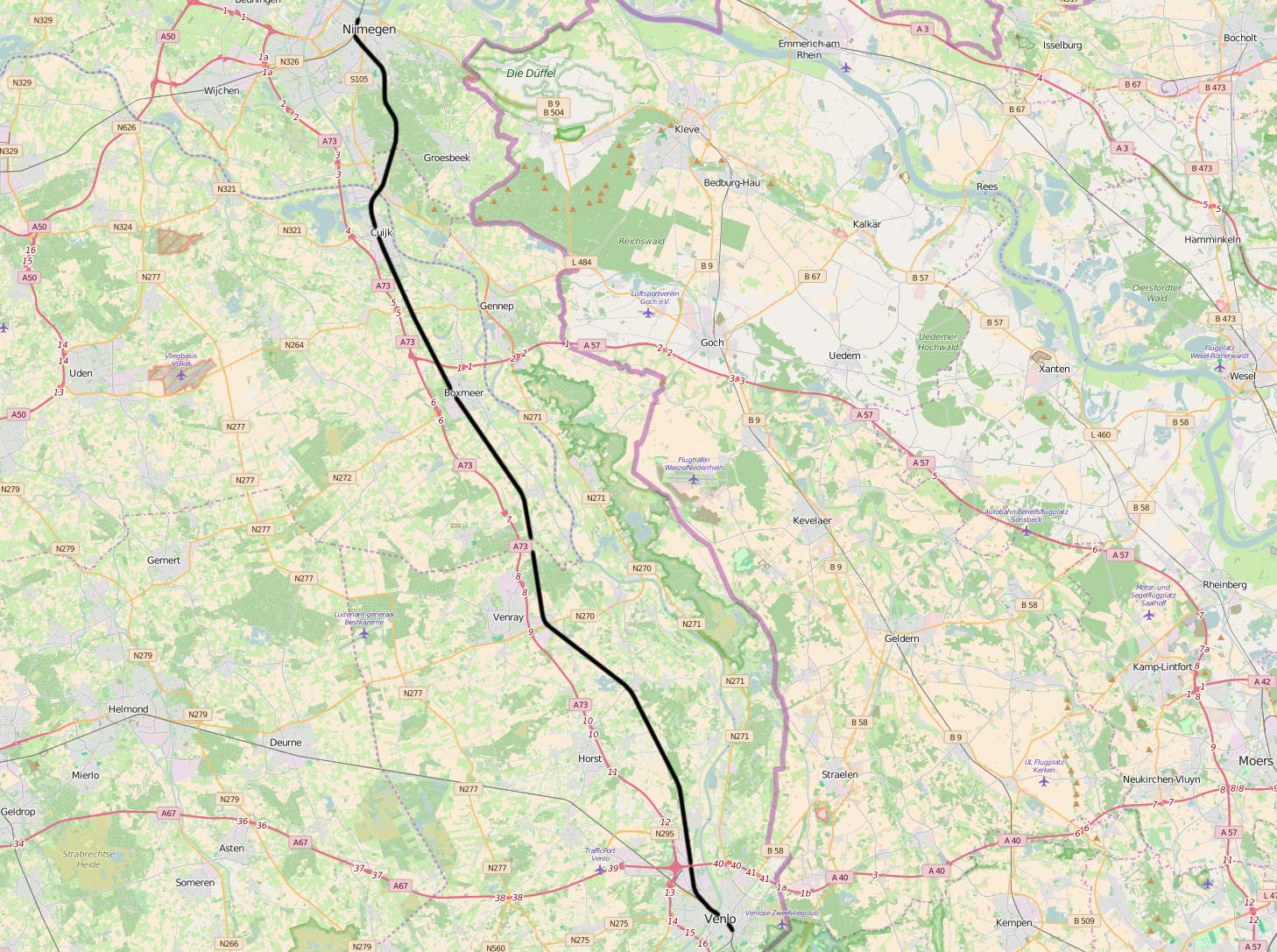

Overview
- Status: Operational
- Locale: The Netherlands
- Termini: Nijmegen railway station; Venlo railway station

Service
- Operator: Nederlandse Spoorwegen

History
- Opened: 1883

Technical
- Line length: 61 km (38 mi)
- Number of tracks: single track
- Track gauge: 1,435 mm (4 ft 8 1/2 in) standard gauge
- Electrification: 1.5 kV DC (2024)

The former watchman's house in Molenhoek

The Nijmegen–Venlo railway, also called Maaslijn, is a railway line in the Netherlands running from Nijmegen to Venlo, passing through Boxmeer and Venray. The line was opened in 1883. Between 2006 and 2016, passenger transport on the line was exploited by Veolia. From 2016 to 2031, Arriva will provide train services on the line.

== Future ==
The line was planned to be electrified in 2024. Once this is completed it is planned to operate additional fast services along the line. ProRail halted the project in April 2022, citing a rise in the cost of materials and other problems due to the Russian invasion of Ukraine.

Works have started on the electrification of the Maaslijn in 2026 with projected completion of the electrification, partial double tracking and improved rail crossings to improve security by 2027

== Stations ==
The only interchange stations on the Nijmegen–Venlo railway are the two termini:

- Nijmegen: to Arnhem and 's-Hertogenbosch
- Venlo: to Roermond, Düsseldorf and Eindhoven
